= 2020–21 Djibouti Premier League =

Djibouti Premier League
- Season: 2020–21
- Dates: 11 December 2020 – 24 April 2021
- Champions: Arta/Solar7
- Relegated: AS Barwaqo/CCO; Q5/Nourie Transit
- Champions League: Arta/Solar7
- Confederation Cup: Dikhil
- Matches: 90
- Goals: 328 (3.64 per match)
- Top goalscorer: Gabriel Dadzie (26 goals)
- Biggest home win: GR / SIAF 10–0 Q5 (3 April 2021)
- Biggest away win: Q5 0–8 Arta/Solar7 (13 February 2021); Q5 2–10 Dikhil (15 April 2021)
- Highest scoring: Q5 2–10 Dikhil (15 April 2021)
- Longest winning run: Arta/Solar7 (8 matches)
- Longest unbeaten run: Arta/Solar7 & Port (8 matches)
- Longest winless run: Q5/Nourie Transit (12 matches)
- Longest losing run: AS Barwaqo/CCO (7 matches)

The 2020–21 Djibouti Premier League was the 33rd season of the Djibouti Premier League, the top-tier football league in Djibouti. The season began on 11 December 2020 and ended on 24 April 2021. The 20,000-capacity El Hadj Hassan Gouled Aptidon Stadium is the main venue of the league.

Arta/Solar7, captained by former FC Barcelona midfielder Alex Song, won the league for the first time. The team's forward, Gabriel Dadzie, won the Golden Boot award for a third consecutive season, scoring 26 goals in 18 matches. Samuel Akinbinu, the team's other forward, came second in the scoring standings with 16 goals.

== Standings ==
| Pos | Team | Pld | W | D | L | GF | GA | GD | Pts | Qualification |
|---|---|---|---|---|---|---|---|---|---|---|
| 1 | Arta/Solar7 | 18 | 15 | 1 | 2 | 67 | 20 | +47 | 46 | Qualification for the Champions League |
| 2 | AS Police Nationale | 18 | 11 | 2 | 5 | 38 | 21 | +17 | 35 | |
| 3 | GR / SIAF | 18 | 9 | 6 | 3 | 43 | 21 | +22 | 33 | |
| 4 | Port | 18 | 9 | 6 | 3 | 36 | 19 | +17 | 33 | |
| 5 | Gendarmerie | 18 | 8 | 4 | 6 | 34 | 23 | +11 | 28 | |
| 6 | ASAS Djibouti Télécom | 18 | 7 | 4 | 7 | 29 | 22 | +7 | 25 | |
| 7 | Hayabley/CNSS | 18 | 5 | 7 | 6 | 21 | 24 | −3 | 22 | |
| 8 | Dikhil | 18 | 5 | 4 | 9 | 33 | 35 | −2 | 19 | Qualification for the Confederation Cup (Note: Since the winners of the 2020–21 Djibouti Cup, Arta/Solar7, qualified for the Champions League group stage by league position, the spot given to the Djibouti Cup winners (CAF Confederation Cup preliminary round) was passed down to the runners up.) |
| 9 | AS Barwaqo/CCO | 18 | 2 | 0 | 16 | 11 | 58 | −47 | 6 | Relegation to Djibouti Division 2 |
| 10 | Q5/Nourie Transit | 18 | 1 | 2 | 15 | 16 | 85 | −69 | 5 | Relegation to Djibouti Division 2 |

Source: RSSSF
Rules for classification: 1) points; 2) goal difference; 3) number of goals scored; 4) head-to-head points; 5) head-to-head goal difference; 6) head-to-head goals scored; 7) draw.
