= 2019–20 Djibouti Premier League =

Djibouti Premier League
- Season: 2019–20
- Champions: GR/SIAF
- Top goalscorer: Gabriel Dadzie (18 goals)

The 2019–20 Djibouti Premier League was the 32nd season of the Djibouti Premier League, the top-tier football league in Djibouti. The season began on 27 December 2019 and ended on 5 September 2020. The 20,000-capacity El Hadj Hassan Gouled Aptidon Stadium is the main venue of the league.

== Standings ==
| Pos | Team | Pld | W | D | L | GF | GA | GD | Pts | Qualification |
|---|---|---|---|---|---|---|---|---|---|---|
| 1 | GR / SIAF | 18 | 12 | 2 | 4 | 35 | 13 | +22 | 38 | Qualification for the Champions League |
| 2 | Port | 18 | 11 | 3 | 4 | 39 | 24 | +15 | 36 | |
| 3 | ASAS Djibouti Télécom | 18 | 11 | 2 | 5 | 46 | 26 | +20 | 35 | |
| 4 | Arta/Solar7 | 18 | 9 | 4 | 5 | 39 | 21 | +18 | 31 | Qualification for the Confederation Cup (Note: Arta/Solar7 qualified for the CAF Confederation Cup preliminary round as the 2020 Djibouti Cup winners.) |
| 5 | Dikhil | 18 | 8 | 6 | 4 | 38 | 16 | +22 | 30 | |
| 6 | Espérance de Djibouti | 18 | 8 | 2 | 8 | 34 | 22 | +12 | 26 | |
| 7 | Gendarmerie | 18 | 7 | 4 | 7 | 21 | 18 | +3 | 25 | |
| 8 | Hayabley/CNSS | 18 | 4 | 6 | 8 | 21 | 31 | −10 | 18 | |
| 9 | EAD / PK 12 | 18 | 3 | 2 | 13 | 20 | 46 | −26 | 11 | Relegation to Djibouti Division 2 |
| 10 | Institut/ETP | 18 | 1 | 1 | 16 | 12 | 88 | −76 | 4 | Relegation to Djibouti Division 2 |

Source: FDF
Rules for classification: 1) points; 2) goal difference; 3) number of goals scored; 4) head-to-head points; 5) head-to-head goal difference; 6) head-to-head goals scored; 7) draw.
