= 2015–16 Djibouti Premier League =

Djibouti Premier League
- Season: 2015–16
- Champions: Djibouti Télécom

The 2015–16 Djibouti Premier League was the 28th season of the Djibouti Premier League. The defending champions were ASAS Djibouti Télécom.

== Teams ==
Location of stadiums

Team	Stadium	Capacity	Ref
ASAS Djibouti Télécom	Stade du Ville	10,000	
AS CDE-Colas	Stade du Ville	10,000	
AS Port	Stade du Ville	10,000	
AS Tadjourah	Stade du Ville	10,000	
FC Dikhil	Stade du Ville	10,000	
Garde Républicaine FC	Stade du Ville	10,000	
Gendarmerie Nationale FC	Stade du Ville	10,000	
Hôpital Balbala	Stade du Ville	10,000	
SDVK	Stade du Ville	10,000	
Bahache/Université de Djibouti	Stade du Ville	10,000	

== Season ==
=== League table ===
Pos	Team	Pld	W	D	L	GF	GA	GD	Pts	
1	AS Ali Sabieh Djibouti Télécom (C)	13	10	2	1	27	9	+18	32	Qualification to 2017 CAF Champions League qualifying rounds and 2016–17 Arab Club Championship qualifying rounds
2	Gendarmerie	13	10	0	3	27	11	+16	30	
3	AS Port	13	9	1	3	22	12	+10	28	
4	Garde Républicaine	13	8	1	4	28	14	+14	25	
5	Université de Djibouti	13	6	3	4	19	13	+6	21	
6	FC Dikhil	13	5	3	5	19	20	−1	18	
7	Hôpital Balbala	13	4	0	9	9	21	−12	12	
8	AS CDE-Colas	13	4	0	9	11	27	−16	12	
9	AS Tadjourah (R)	13	3	0	10	12	30	−18	9	Relegation Djibouti Second Division
10	SDVK (R)	13	1	0	12	9	26	−17	3	Relegation Djibouti Second Division

Updated to match(es) played on 11 April 2016. Source:
Rules for classification: 1) points; 2) goal difference; 3) number of goals scored.
(C) Champions; (R) Relegated

=== Results ===
Home \ Away	SDV	HOP	UNI	GEN	GAR	DIK	TAD	POR	CDE	ASAS	SDV	HOP	UNI	GEN	GAR	DIK	TAD	POR	CDE	ASAS
SDVK		1–2	0–3	0–1	1–3	2–1	3–0	0–3		0–2						0–1	0–2			
Hôpital Balbala	1–0		0–1	0–1	0–2	1–3		0–3	1–0											
Bahache/Université de Djibouti	4–2			0–2	2–0	2–0	0–1	1–1		1–1								2–3		
Gendarmerie Nationale FC	4–2		0–1				3–2	0–1		0–2										
Garde Républicaine FC	2–0	2–1		1–2		2–1			4–0	0–1										
FC Dikhil			2–2		2–2		1–0		0–3	3–3									2–1	
AS Tadjourah		1–2		1–7	2–3			0–1	2–0	0–5										
AS Port	2–0					2–1			2–1											
AS CDE-Colas	2–1	2–0	0–3	0–3	0–5	0–2	3–1													
AS Ali Sabieh Djibouti Télécom		3–1	1–0	0–2	3–2		2–0	1–0	3–0											

Updated to match(es) played on 11 April 2016. Source:
Legend: Blue = home team win; Yellow = draw; Red = away team win.

== Attendances ==
The average league attendance was 377. The defending champions, ASAS Djibouti Télécom, played home games in front of hundreds of spectators in the 2015-16 league season.

#	Club	Average
1	ASAS Djibouti Télécom	847
2	Garde Républicaine	634
3	AS Port	472
4	FC Dikhil	412
5	Université de Djibouti	394
6	Gendarmerie Nationale	368
7	Hôpital Balbala	189
8	AS CDE-Colas	173
9	AS Tadjourah	147
10	SDVK	132
