= 2021–22 Djibouti Premier League =

Djibouti Premier League
- Season: 2021–22
- Dates: 22 October 2020 – 23 April 2022
- Champions: Arta/Solar7
- Relegated: EAD/PK 12; Arhiba FC
- Champions League: Arta/Solar7
- Confederation Cup: ASAS Djibouti Télécom
- Matches played: 90
- Goals scored: 276 (3.07 per match)
- Top goalscorer: Gabriel Dadzie (18 goals)
- Biggest home win: Arta/Solar7 12–1 Arhiba (23 April 2022)
- Biggest away win: Arhiba 0–8 Port (11 February 2022)
- Highest scoring: Arta/Solar7 12–1 Arhiba (23 April 2022)
- Longest winning run: ASAS Djibouti Télécom (6 matches)
- Longest unbeaten run: Arta/Solar7 (10 matches)
- Longest winless run: Arhiba (18 matches)
- Longest losing run: Arhiba (18 matches)

The 2021–22 Djibouti Premier League was the 34th season of the Djibouti Premier League, the top-tier football league in Djibouti. The season began on 22 October 2021 and ended on 23 April 2022. The 20,000-capacity El Hadj Hassan Gouled Aptidon Stadium is the main venue of the league.

Arta/Solar7, captained by former FC Barcelona midfielder Alex Song, won the league for the second consecutive season. The team's forward, Gabriel Dadzie, won the Golden Boot award, scoring 18 goals.

The two newly promoted teams, EAD/PK 12 and Arhiba FC, were both relegated. Arhiba lost every game while EAD / PK 12 finished 9th on goal difference after a 0–1 loss to FC Dikhil in their final match.

== Standings ==
Pos	Team	Pld	W	D	L	GF	GA	GD	Pts	Qualification
1	Arta/Solar7	18	14	3	1	55	12	+43	45	Qualification for the Champions League
2	AS Port	18	10	5	3	39	19	+20	35	
3	GR/SIAF	18	10	5	3	29	14	+15	35	
4	ASAS Djibouti Télécom	18	10	4	4	34	18	+16	34	Qualification for the Confederation Cup (Note: Since the winners of the 2021–22 Djibouti Cup, Arta/Solar7, qualified for the Champions League group stage by league position, the spot given to the Djibouti Cup winners (CAF Confederation Cup preliminary round) was passed down to the runners up.)
5	Gendarmerie	18	7	6	5	21	21	0	27	
6	AS Police Nationale	18	7	5	6	24	21	+3	26	
7	FC Dikhil	18	4	7	7	21	23	−2	19	
8	Hayabley/CNSS	18	4	2	12	25	33	−8	14	
9	EAD/PK 12	18	3	5	10	11	24	−13	14	Relegation to Djibouti Division 2
10	Arhiba FC	18	0	0	18	17	91	−74	0	Relegation to Djibouti Division 2

Source: RSSSF
Rules for classification: 1) points; 2) goal difference; 3) number of goals scored; 4) head-to-head points; 5) head-to-head goal difference; 6) head-to-head goals scored; 7) draw.
