= 2018–19 Djibouti Premier League =

Djibouti Premier League
- Season: 2018–19
- Relegated: AS Jeunes Jago; AS Kartileh

The 2018–19 Djibouti Premier League was the 31st season of the Djibouti Premier League, the top-tier football league in Djibouti. The season started on 9 November 2018 and ended on 27 April 2019.

== Standings ==
Pos	Team	Pld	W	D	L	GF	GA	GD	Pts	Qualification
1	Port	18	12	4	2	51	20	+31	40	Qualification for the Champions League (Note: Port did not enter into the 2019–20 CAF Champions League.)
2	Espérance de Djibouti	18	11	6	1	38	14	+24	39	
3	ASAS Djibouti Télécom	18	11	5	2	49	15	+34	38	
4	Dikhil	18	9	5	4	34	21	+13	32	
5	Arta/Solar7	18	8	6	4	31	17	+14	30	Qualification for the Confederation Cup (Note: Arta/Solar7 qualified for the CAF Confederation Cup preliminary round as the 2019 Djibouti Cup winners.)
6	Hayabley/CNSS	18	6	4	8	30	37	−7	22	
7	GR / SIAF	18	6	3	9	45	33	+12	21	
8	Gendarmerie	18	6	3	9	32	24	+8	21	
9	Jago	18	2	1	15	17	79	−62	7	Relegation to Djibouti Division 2
10	Kartileh 2 / UCIG	18	0	1	17	12	79	−67	1	Relegation to Djibouti Division 2

Source: FDF
Rules for classification: 1) points; 2) goal difference; 3) number of goals scored; 4) head-to-head points; 5) head-to-head goal difference; 6) head-to-head goals scored; 7) draw.
