= 2022–23 Djibouti Premier League =

Djibouti Premier League
- Season: 2022–23
- Relegated: Q5/Nourie Transit
- Matches played: 72
- Goals scored: 209 (2.9 per match)

The 2022–23 Djibouti Premier League was the 36th season of the Djibouti Premier League, the top-tier football league in Djibouti. The season began on 18 October 2022 and ended on 27 May 2023. The 20,000-capacity El Hadj Hassan Gouled Aptidon Stadium is the main venue for the league. League games usually take place in front of dozens of spectators.

Garde Républicaine won the title on the last day, defeating Arta/Solar7 4–2 to finish on 39 points.

== Standings ==
Pos	Team	Pld	W	D	L	GF	GA	GD	Pts	Qualification
1	GR/SIAF	16	13	0	3	33	17	+16	39	Qualification for the Champions League
2	ASAS Djibouti Télécom	16	12	1	3	40	13	+27	37	
3	Arta/Solar7	16	9	3	4	38	20	+18	30	
4	AS Port	16	9	3	4	26	17	+9	30	Qualification for the Confederation Cup
5	Hayabley/CNSS	16	6	3	7	16	20	−4	21	
6	FC Dikhil	16	5	4	7	24	27	−3	19	
7	CF Gendarmerie	16	1	8	7	16	23	−7	11	
8	SDC Group	16	1	5	10	9	32	−23	8	
9	Q5/Nourie Transit	16	1	3	12	7	40	−33	6	Relegation to Djibouti Division 2

Source: Soccerway
Rules for classification: 1) points; 2) goal difference; 3) number of goals scored; 4) head-to-head points; 5) head-to-head goal difference; 6) head-to-head goals scored; 7) draw.
