= 2016–17 Djibouti Premier League =

Djibouti Premier League
- Season: 2016–17
- Champions: AS Ali Sabieh Djibouti Télécom

The 2016–17 Djibouti Premier League was the 29th season of the Djibouti Premier League. The season started on 21 October 2016 and concluded on 6 May 2017.

== Standings ==
Pos	Team	Pld	W	D	L	GF	GA	GD	Pts	Qualification
1	ASAS Djibouti Télécom	18	16	1	1	63	14	+49	49	Qualification for Champions League
2	Port	18	15	1	2	56	15	+41	46	
3	GR / SIAF	18	10	3	5	53	20	+33	33	
4	Gendarmerie	18	7	5	6	37	17	+20	26	
5	Espérance de Djibouti	18	6	6	6	31	22	+9	24	
6	Arhiba	18	5	7	6	25	21	+4	22	
7	Dikhil	18	5	6	7	22	18	+4	21	
8	Arta/Solar7	18	5	4	9	30	37	−7	19	
9	SDC Group	18	3	3	12	31	43	−12	12	Relegation to Djibouti Division One
10	Cité Stade	18	0	0	18	10	151	−141	0	Relegation to Djibouti Division One

Updated to match(es) played on 6 May 2017. Source: Soccerway
Rules for classification: 1) points; 2) goal difference; 3) number of goals scored; 4) head-to-head points; 5) head-to-head goal difference; 6) head-to-head goals scored; 7) draw.
