= 2017–18 Djibouti Premier League =

Djibouti Premier League
- Season: 2017–18
- Champions: Djibouti Télécom

The 2017–18 Djibouti Premier League was the 30th season of the Djibouti Premier League, the top-tier football league in Djibouti. The season started on 20 October 2017.

Djibouti Télécom won the league.

== Standings ==
Pos	Team	Pld	W	D	L	GF	GA	GD	Pts	Qualification
1	ASAS Djibouti Télécom	12	9	1	2	25	10	+15	28	Qualification for Champions League
2	GR / SIAF	12	8	3	1	30	12	+18	27	
3	Port	12	8	2	2	34	16	+18	26	
4	Espérance de Djibouti	12	7	2	3	27	8	+19	23	
5	Gendarmerie	12	6	4	2	24	6	+18	22	
6	Dikhil	12	3	3	6	15	20	−5	12	
7	Arta/Solar7	12	3	3	6	10	17	−7	12	
8	Kartileh 2 / UCIG	12	3	0	9	11	22	−11	9	
9	Tadjourah	12	1	4	7	12	46	−34	7	Relegation to Djibouti Division One
10	Arhiba	12	0	2	10	4	35	−31	2	Relegation to Djibouti Division One

Updated to match(es) played on 17 March 2018. Source: Soccerway
Rules for classification: 1) points; 2) goal difference; 3) number of goals scored; 4) head-to-head points; 5) head-to-head goal difference; 6) head-to-head goals scored; 7) draw.

== See also ==
- 2018 Djibouti Cup
