= 2021–22 Djibouti Division 2 =

Football league season in Djibouti (2021–22)

Djibouti Division 2
- Season: 2021–22
- Dates: 22 October 2021 – 26 March 2022
- Champions: Q5/Nourie Transit
- Promoted: Q5/Nourie Transit; SDC Group
- Relegated: Djebel; SDVK 2
- Matches played: 90
- Goals scored: 291 (3.23 per match)

The 2021–22 Djibouti Division 2 was the 2021–22 edition of the Djibouti Division 2, the second-tier football league in Djibouti. The season began on 22 October 2021 and ended on 26 March 2022. The 20,000-capacity El Hadj Hassan Gouled Aptidon Stadium and 3,000-capacity Centre Technique National are the main venues of the league.

== Standings ==
Pos	Team	Pld	W	D	L	GF	GA	GD	Pts	Qualification
1	Q5/Nourie Transit	18	12	3	3	38	18	+20	39	Promotion to the Djibouti Premier League
2	SDC Group	18	11	4	3	35	14	+21	37	Promotion to the Djibouti Premier League
3	Garde-Côtes	18	9	8	1	36	20	+16	35	
4	Hadji-Dideh	18	10	3	5	33	22	+11	33	
5	Cité GARGAR	18	6	5	7	16	24	−8	23	
6	Einguella	18	5	6	7	31	32	−1	21	
7	Damerjog	18	5	4	9	32	36	−4	19	
8	AS Barwaqo/CCO	18	4	4	10	24	40	−16	16	
9	Djebel	18	2	7	9	23	47	−24	13	Relegation to Djibouti Division 3
10	SDVK	18	1	6	11	23	38	−15	9	Relegation to Djibouti Division 3

Source: RSSSF
Rules for classification: 1) points; 2) goal difference; 3) number of goals scored; 4) head-to-head points; 5) head-to-head goal difference; 6) head-to-head goals scored; 7) draw.
