= Gabriel Dadzie =

Djiboutian footballer (born 1997)

Personal information
- Full name: Gabriel Abeiku Dadzie
- Date of birth: 6 March 1997 (age 29)
- Place of birth: Ghana
- Position: Striker

Team information
- Current team: Al Tersana

Senior career*
Years	Team	Apps	(Gls)
2015	Wa Africa United		
2016–2017	Stade d'Abidjan		
2017–2018	AS Police (Niger)		
2018–2020	AS Port	31	(36)
2020–2022	Arta/Solar7	35	(44)
2022	ASAS Djibouti Télécom	18	(26)
2023–2024	Arta/Solar7	14	(8)
2025	Al Bashaer	8	(4)
2025	Al Tersana	8	(1)

International career
2022–	Djibouti	20	(6)
- * Club domestic league appearances and goals

Gabriel Abeiku Dadzie (born 6 March 1997) is a footballer who plays as a striker. Born in Ghana, he is a Djibouti international.

== Club career ==
In 2016, Dadzie signed for Ivorian side Stade d'Abidjan. In 2020, he signed for Arta/Solar7 in Djibouti, helping them win two consecutive league titles, their first league titles. He was top scorer league 4 times (2019-20, 2020-21, 2021-22, and 2022-23) with 18 goals, 26 goals, 18 goals, and 26 goals respectively.

== Career statistics ==
=== Club ===
Club	Season	League			Cup		Continental		Others		Total	
Club	Season	Division	Apps	Goals	Apps	Goals	Apps	Goals	Apps	Goals	Apps	Goals
Port	2018-19	DPL	15	18			2	3			17	21
Port	2019-20	DPL	16	18			-				16	18
Arta/Solar7	2020-21	DPL	18	26	1	0	2	1			21	27
Arta/Solar7	2021-22	DPL	17	18	1	5	2	0			20	23
Arta/Solar7	2023-24	DPL	14	8	3	1	4	3			21	12
Arta/Solar7	2024-25	DPL					2	2			2	2
ASAS Djibouti Télécom	2022-23	DPL	18	26	1	1	2	0			21	27
Al Bashaer	2024-25	Libyan Premier League	8	4							8	4
Total career			106	118	6	7	14	9			126	134

=== International ===
As of 29 March 2026

National team	Years	Apps	Goals
Djibouti	2022	4	1
Djibouti	2023	4	2
Djibouti	2024	7	3
Djibouti	2025	3	0
Djibouti	2026	2	0
Total		20	6

=== International goals ===
Scores and results list Djibouti's goal tally first.

No.	Date	Venue	Opponent	Score	Result	Competition
1.	29 July 2022	Benjamin Mkapa Stadium, Dar es Salaam, Tanzania	Burundi	1–1	2–1 (4–2 p)	2022 African Nations Championship qualification
2.	14 June 2023	Côte d'Or National Sports Complex, Saint Pierre, Mauritius	Mauritius	2–1	3–1	2023 Mauritius Four Nations Cup
3.	17 June 2023	Côte d'Or National Sports Complex, Saint Pierre, Mauritius	Pakistan	2–0	3–1	2023 Mauritius Four Nations Cup
4.	5 June 2024	Ben M'Hamed El Abdi Stadium, El Jadida, Morocco	Sierra Leone	1–1	1–2	2026 FIFA World Cup qualification
5.	9 June 2024	Ben M'Hamed El Abdi Stadium, El Jadida, Morocco	Ethiopia	1–1	1–1	2026 FIFA World Cup qualification
6.	27 October 2024	Amahoro Stadium, Kigali, Rwanda	Rwanda	1–0	1–0	2024 African Nations Championship qualification
