= Football in Djibouti =

- Country: Djibouti
- Governing body: Djiboutian Football Federation
- National team: Djibouti national football team
- Clubs: Djibouti Premier League

International competitions
- Champions League; CAF Confederation Cup; Super Cup; FIFA Club World Cup; FIFA World Cup(National Team); African Cup of Nations(National Team)

Football is the most popular sport in Djibouti. The country became a member of FIFA in 1994, but has only taken part in the qualifying rounds for the African Cup of Nations as well as the FIFA World Cup in the mid-2000s. In November 2007, the Djibouti national football team beat Somalia's national squad 1–0 in the qualification rounds for the 2010 FIFA World Cup, marking its first World Cup-related win.

== League system ==
Level	League(s)/Division(s)
1	Division 1; 10 clubs
	↓↑ 2 clubs
2	Division 2; 10 clubs
	↓↑ 2 clubs
3	Division 3; 16 clubs divided in 2 series of 8

== Football stadiums in Djibouti ==
El Hadj Hassan Gouled Aptidon Stadium is currently the largest stadium by capacity in Djibouti. It is used by the national football team of Djibouti.

Stadium	Capacity	City	Tenants	Image
El Hadj Hassan Gouled Aptidon Stadium	20,000	Djibouti City	Djibouti national football team	

== Attendances ==
The average attendance per top-flight football league season and the club with the highest average attendance:

Season	League average	Best club	Best club average
2015-16	377	ASAS Djibouti Télécom	847

Source: League page on Wikipedia

== See also ==
- Djiboutian Football Federation
- Djibouti Premier League
- Djibouti national football team
- Djibouti Cup
- Stade du Ville
- Lists of stadiums
