= Nasradine Abdi Aptidon =

Djiboutian footballer (born 1994)

Personal information
- Full name: Nasradine Abdi Aptidon
- Date of birth: 5 June 1994 (age 32)
- Place of birth: Djibouti, Djibouti
- Height: 1.81 m (5 ft 11 in)
- Position: Goalkeeper

Team information
- Current team: AS Port
- Number: 1

Senior career*
Years	Team	Apps	(Gls)
2017–2018	AS Arta/Solar7		
2018–	AS Port		

International career^{‡}
2019–	Djibouti	2	(0)
- * Club domestic league appearances and goals ‡ National team caps and goals as of 4 August 2019

Nasradine Abdi Aptidon (Arabic: نصر الدين عبدي أبتيدون; born 5 June 1994) is a Djiboutian footballer who plays as a goalkeeper for Djiboutian club AS Port and the Djibouti national team.

== Asylum in France ==
In September 2021, Aptidon and two of his Djibouti national team teammates, Bilal Ahmed and Aboubaker Omar, failed to board a connecting flight in Orly Airport, in Paris, France, on their way to play away to Algeria in a 2022 FIFA World Cup qualification match. Aptidon left the airport seven days later, and sought asylum in France alongside his teammates.

In October, Aptidon and Omar applied for asylum in Rennes, and have been granted a 10-month residence permit.

== Honours ==
AS Port

- Djibouti Premier League: 2018–19
