= 2018–19 Arab Club Champions Cup =

2018–19 Zayed Champions Cup

Tournament details
- Dates: Qualifying: 5–24 May 2018; Competition proper: 31 July 2018 – 18 April 2019
- Teams: 40 (from 2 confederations) (from 19 associations)

Final positions
- Champions: (Tunisia) ES Sahel (1st title)
- Runners-up: (Saudi Arabia) Al-Hilal

Tournament statistics
- Matches played: 69
- Goals scored: 177 (2.57 per match)
- Top scorer(s): (Sudan) Mohamed Abdel Rahman (7 goals)
- Best player: (Tunisia) Yassine Chikhaoui
- Best goalkeeper: (Saudi Arabia) Abdullah Al-Mayouf

The 2018–19 Arab Club Champions Cup, officially named the 2018–19 Zayed Champions Cup (Arabic: كأس زايد للأندية الأبطال 2018–19) to mark 100 years since the birth of the late Sheikh Zayed bin Sultan Al Nahyan, was the 28th season (Note: Not including the cancelled 1990 edition.) of the Arab Club Champions Cup, the Arab world's club football tournament organised by UAFA, and the first season since it was renamed from the Arab Club Championship to the Arab Club Champions Cup.

The final was played at the Hazza bin Zayed Stadium in Al Ain, United Arab Emirates, between Al-Hilal of Saudi Arabia and Étoile du Sahel of Tunisia. It was the fourth time Al-Hilal reached the final in their history, while it marked the first appearance of Étoile du Sahel in this stage. Étoile du Sahel defeated Al-Hilal 2–1 in the final and won the title for the first time in their history, becoming the third Tunisian team to win the competition in the last five editions.

Espérance de Tunis were the defending champions, having won the title in the previous edition. They were eliminated by Al-Ittihad Alexandria in the first round.

== Prize money ==
The prize money was as follows:

- Winners: $6 million
- Runners-up: $2.5 million

== Teams ==
A total of 40 teams participated in the tournament; 20 from Asia and 20 from Africa. 10 clubs started in the qualifying play-off where two of them advanced to the first round which consisted of 32 teams. From then on, the tournament was played in a knockout format with home and away legs, until the final which was a one-leg match played in the United Arab Emirates.

Asia Zone
Team	League position	App (Last)
First round entrants
(Saudi Arabia) Al-Hilal	2016–17 Saudi Professional League champions	10th (2017)
(Saudi Arabia) Al-Ahli Jeddah	2016–17 Saudi Professional League runners-up	9th (2006–07)
(Saudi Arabia) Al-Nassr	2016–17 Saudi Professional League third place	6th (2017)
(Saudi Arabia) Al-Ittihad Jeddah	2016–17 Saudi Professional League fourth place	10th (2006–07)
(United Arab Emirates) Al-Jazira	2016–17 UAE Pro-League champions	1st
(United Arab Emirates) Al-Wasl	2016–17 UAE Pro-League runners-up	2nd (1998)
(United Arab Emirates) Al-Ain	2016–17 UAE Pro-League fourth place	1st
(Bahrain) Al-Riffa	2016–17 Bahrain First Division League runners-up	9th (2017)
(Bahrain) Al-Muharraq	2016–17 Bahrain First Division League fifth place	5th (2004–05)
(Iraq) Al-Quwa Al-Jawiya	2016–17 Iraqi Premier League champions	4th (2012–13)
(Iraq) Al-Naft	2016–17 Iraqi Premier League runners-up	1st
Al-Kuwait	2016–17 Kuwaiti Premier League champions	7th (2008–09)
(Kuwait) Al-Qadsia	2016–17 Kuwaiti Premier League runners-up	8th (2006–07)
(Jordan) Al-Ramtha	2016–17 Jordan League fifth place	1st
(Lebanon) Salam Zgharta	2016–17 Lebanese Premier League runners-up	1st
(Oman) Al-Shabab	2016–17 Oman Professional League runners-up	1st
(Syria) Al-Jaish	2016–17 Syrian Premier League champions	8th (2017)
Play-off round entrants
(Kuwait) Al-Salmiya	2016–17 Kuwaiti Premier League sixth place	2nd (1999)
(Lebanon) Al-Nejmeh	2016–17 Lebanese Premier League third place	7th (2012–13)
(Saudi Arabia) Al-Faisaly	2016–17 Saudi Professional League ninth place	1st

Africa Zone
Team	League position	App (Last)
First round entrants
(Algeria) ES Sétif	2016–17 Algerian Ligue Professionnelle 1 champions	5th (2008–09)
(Algeria) MC Alger	2016–17 Algerian Ligue Professionnelle 1 runners-up	4th (2006–07)
(Algeria) USM Alger	2016–17 Algerian Ligue Professionnelle 1 third place	5th (2012–13)
(Egypt) Al-Ahly	2016–17 Egyptian Premier League champions	8th (2017)
(Egypt) Zamalek	2016–17 Egyptian Premier League third place	7th (2017)
(Egypt) Ismaily	2016–17 Egyptian Premier League sixth place	7th (2012–13)
(Tunisia) Espérance de Tunis	2016–17 Tunisian Ligue Professionnelle 1 champions	8th (2017)
(Tunisia) Étoile du Sahel	2016–17 Tunisian Ligue Professionnelle 1 runners-up	4th (2003–04)
(Tunisia) CS Sfaxien	2016–17 Tunisian Ligue Professionnelle 1 fourth place	7th (2008–09)
(Morocco) Wydad Casablanca	2016–17 Botola champions	6th (2008–09)
(Morocco) Raja Casablanca	2016–17 Botola third place	9th (2012–13)
(Libya) Al-Ahli Tripoli	2016 Libyan Premier League champions	3rd (2008–09)
(Sudan) Al-Merrikh	2017 Sudan Premier League runners-up	11th (2017)
Play-off round entrants
(Egypt) Al-Ittihad Alexandria	2016–17 Egyptian Premier League eighth place	1st
(Mauritania) ASAC Concorde	2016–17 Ligue 1 Mauritania champions	2nd (2004–05)
(Morocco) Fath Union Sport	2016–17 Botola seventh place	2nd (2017)
(Tunisia) Club Africain	2016–17 Tunisian Ligue Professionnelle 1 third place	8th (2006–07)
Preliminary round entrants
(Comoros) Ngazi de Mirontsi	2017 Comoros Premier League fifth place	1st
ASAS Djibouti Télécom	2016–17 Djibouti Premier League champions	2nd (2017)
(Somalia) Banadir	2016–17 Somali First Division runners-up	1st

Associations which did not enter a team
- Palestine
- Qatar
- Yemen

== Schedule ==
The schedule of the competition was as follows:

Phase	Round	Draw date	Dates
Qualifying play-off	Preliminary round	24 April 2018	5–9 May 2018
Qualifying play-off	Play-off round	24 April 2018	17–24 May 2018
Knockout stage	First round	24 April 2018	31 July – 30 September 2018
Knockout stage	Second round	6 October 2018	27 October – 11 December 2018
Knockout stage	Quarter-finals	17 December 2018	26 January – 25 February 2019
Knockout stage	Semi-finals	17 December 2018	27 February – 15 April 2019
Knockout stage	Final	17 December 2018	18 April 2019

== Qualifying rounds ==
=== Preliminary round ===
Pos	Team	Pld	W	D	L	GF	GA	GD	Pts	Qualification	ADT	BAN	NGA
1	ASAS Djibouti Télécom (H)	2	1	1	0	4	2	+2	4	Advance to Play-off round	—	1–1	3–1
2	(Somalia) Banadir	2	1	1	0	4	3	+1	4			—	3–2
3	(Comoros) Ngazi de Mirontsi	2	0	0	2	3	6	−3	0				—

Source: Goalzz
Rules for classification: 1) Points; 2) Goal difference; 3) Goals scored.
(H) Hosts
5 May 2018
18:00 UTC+3

ASAS Djibouti Télécom	1−1	(Somalia) Banadir
Goal		Benteke

El Hadj Hassan Gouled Stadium, Djibouti City
Referee: Mohamed Jamal Juma (Bahrain)

7 May 2018
18:00 UTC+3

Banadir (Somalia)	3−2	(Comoros) Ngazi de Mirontsi
Benteke; Khaliif	Report	Fanomezantsoa; Harimbola

El Hadj Hassan Gouled Stadium, Djibouti City
Referee: Sultan Al-Harbi (Saudi Arabia)

9 May 2018
18:00 UTC+3

ASAS Djibouti Télécom	3−1	(Comoros) Ngazi de Mirontsi
Obayo 3'; 71' (pen.); 74' (pen.)	Report	Goal

El Hadj Hassan Gouled Stadium, Djibouti City
Referee: Issa Abdulla Ali (Bahrain)

=== Play-off round ===
==== Group A ====
Pos	Team	Pld	W	D	L	GF	GA	GD	Pts	Qualification	NEJ	CA	CON	FAI
1	(Lebanon) Al-Nejmeh	3	3	0	0	7	1	+6	9	Advance to First round	—	1–0	4–0	
2	(Tunisia) Club Africain	3	1	1	1	4	4	0	4			—		2–2
3	(Mauritania) ASAC Concorde	3	1	0	2	4	7	−3	3			1–2	—	
4	(Saudi Arabia) Al-Faisaly	3	0	1	2	4	7	−3	1		1–2		1–3	—

Source: Goalzz
Rules for classification: 1) Points; 2) Goal difference; 3) Goals scored.
17 May 2018
21:30 UTC+3

Club Africain (Tunisia)	2–2	(Saudi Arabia) Al-Faisaly
Dhaouadi 58'; Khefifi 60'	Report	Zé Eduardo 13'; Mendash 90'

King Abdullah Sports City, Jeddah
Referee: Mohanad Qasim Sarray (Iraq)
17 May 2018
23:30 UTC+3

Al-Nejmeh (Lebanon)	4–0	(Mauritania) ASAC Concorde
Siblini 15', 40'; Alaeddine 52'; Maatouk 64'	Report

King Abdullah Sports City, Jeddah
Referee: Sabri Mohammed Fadul (Sudan)

20 May 2018
21:30 UTC+3

Al-Faisaly (Saudi Arabia)	1–2	(Lebanon) Al-Nejmeh
Luisinho 48'	Report	Matar 53'; Al Hajj 90+1'

King Abdullah Sports City, Jeddah
Referee: Redouane Jiyed (Morocco)
20 May 2018
23:30 UTC+3

ASAC Concorde (Mauritania)	1–2	(Tunisia) Club Africain
Mohamed 62'	Report	Chammakhi 54'; Khefifi 63'

King Abdullah Sports City, Jeddah
Referee: Lahlou Benbraham (Algeria)

23 May 2018
21:30 UTC+3

Al-Nejmeh (Lebanon)	1–0	(Tunisia) Club Africain
Maatouk 68' (pen.)	Report

King Abdullah Sports City, Jeddah
Referee: Redouane Jiyed (Morocco)
23 May 2018
23:30 UTC+3

Al-Faisaly (Saudi Arabia)	1–3	(Mauritania) ASAC Concorde
Hyland 53'		Seck 35', 78'; Sy 71'

King Abdullah Sports City, Jeddah
Referee: Lahlou Benbraham (Algeria)

==== Group B ====
Pos	Team	Pld	W	D	L	GF	GA	GD	Pts	Qualification	ITH	FUS	SAL	ADT
1	(Egypt) Al-Ittihad Alexandria	3	2	1	0	14	1	+13	7	Advance to First round	—	1–1		8–0
2	(Morocco) FUS Rabat	3	2	1	0	13	1	+12	7			—	5–0	
3	(Kuwait) Al-Salmiya	3	1	0	2	4	10	−6	3		0–5		—	4–0
4	ASAS Djibouti Télécom	3	0	0	3	0	19	−19	0			0–7		—

Source: Goalzz
Rules for classification: 1) Points; 2) Goal difference; 3) Goals scored.
18 May 2018
21:30 UTC+3

Al-Ittihad Alexandria (Egypt)	1–1	(Morocco) FUS Rabat
Cissé 28'	Report	Louadni 13'

King Abdullah Sports City, Jeddah
Referee: Mohammed Al Hoish (Saudi Arabia)
18 May 2018
23:30 UTC+3

Al-Salmiya (Kuwait)	4–0	ASAS Djibouti Télécom
Al Enezi 7'; Al-Khatib 9'; Al-Saify 22' (pen.); Al Rashidi 74'	Report

King Abdullah Sports City, Jeddah
Referee: Ahmed Yacoub Ibrahim (Jordan)

21 May 2018
21:30 UTC+3

Al-Salmiya (Kuwait)	0–5	(Egypt) Al-Ittihad Alexandria
	Report	Banahene 18', 90'; El Deeb 43'; Cissé 63'; Khaled 83'

King Abdullah Sports City, Jeddah
Referee: Mohanad Qasim Sarray (Iraq)
21 May 2018
23:30 UTC+3

ASAS Djibouti Télécom	0–7	(Morocco) FUS Rabat
	Report	Anouar 25'; Diakité 36'; El Bahraoui 38'; Badamosi 66'; El Bettache 68'; Louani 86'; El Bassil 90+4'

King Abdullah Sports City, Jeddah
Referee: Khalid Saleh Al-Turais (Saudi Arabia)

24 May 2018
22:00 UTC+3

Al-Ittihad Alexandria (Egypt)	8–0	ASAS Djibouti Télécom
Cissé 5'; Banahene 18', 43'; Gedo 55', 83', 90+1'; Kabouria 81'; Abdel Maguid 82'	Report

King Abdullah Sports City, Jeddah
Referee: Khalid Saleh Al-Turais (Saudi Arabia)
24 May 2018
22:00 UTC+3

FUS Rabat (Morocco)	5–0	(Kuwait) Al-Salmiya
Zerhouni 41'; Skouma 45'; Diakité 50'; Herimat 79'; Badamosi 90'	Report

Prince Mohammed bin Abdullah Al Faisal Stadium, Jeddah
Referee: Ahmed Yacoub Ibrahim (Jordan)

== Knockout phase ==
=== Bracket ===
First round
(Saudi Arabia) Al-Hilal	1	1	2
(Oman) Al-Shabab	0	0	0
(Iraq) Al-Naft (a)	1	2	3
(Tunisia) CS Sfaxien	1	2	3
(Egypt) Al-Ittihad Alexandria (a)	1	2	3
(Tunisia) Espérance de Tunis	1	2	3
(Egypt) Zamalek (a)	0	1	1
(Kuwait) Al-Qadsia	0	1	1
(Egypt) Al-Ahly	0	4	4
(Lebanon) Al-Nejmeh	0	1	1
(Saudi Arabia) Al-Ittihad Jeddah	1	0	1
(United Arab Emirates) Al-Wasl (a)	1	0	1
(United Arab Emirates) Al-Ain	1	1	2
(Algeria) ES Sétif (a)	2	0	2
(Bahrain) Al-Muharraq	0	0	0
(Saudi Arabia) Al-Ahli Jeddah	2	3	5
(Egypt) Ismaily (p)	2	0	2 (4)
Al-Kuwait	0	2	2 (2)
(Lebanon) Salam Zgharta	1	1	2
(Morocco) Raja Casablanca	2	1	3
(Morocco) Wydad Casablanca (p)	1	1	2 (4)
(Libya) Al-Ahli Tripoli	1	1	1 (2)
(Tunisia) Étoile du Sahel	3	3	6
(Jordan) Al-Ramtha	1	1	2
(United Arab Emirates) Al-Jazira	1	1	2
(Saudi Arabia) Al-Nassr	2	4	6
(Bahrain) Al-Riffa	1	0	1
(Algeria) MC Alger	2	0	2
(Syria) Al-Jaish	1	1	2
(Sudan) Al-Merrikh	3	1	4
(Iraq) Al-Quwa Al-Jawiya	0	0	0
(Algeria) USM Alger	1	3	4

Second round
(Saudi Arabia) Al-Hilal	4	2	6
(Iraq) Al-Naft	0	0	0
(Egypt) Al-Ittihad Alexandria (p)	0	1	1 (4)
(Egypt) Zamalek	1	0	1 (3)
(Egypt) Al-Ahly	2	1	3
(United Arab Emirates) Al-Wasl (a)	2	1	3
(Algeria) ES Sétif	0	1	1
(Saudi Arabia) Al-Ahli Jeddah	1	1	2
(Egypt) Ismaily	0	0	0 (2)
(Morocco) Raja Casablanca (p)	0	0	0 (4)
(Morocco) Wydad Casablanca	0	0	0
(Tunisia) Étoile du Sahel	0	1	1
(Saudi Arabia) Al-Nassr	0	1	1
(Algeria) MC Alger	1	2	3
(Sudan) Al-Merrikh	4	0	4
(Algeria) USM Alger	1	2	3

Quarter-finals
(Saudi Arabia) Al-Hilal	3	0	3
(Egypt) Al-Ittihad Alexandria	0	0	0
(United Arab Emirates) Al-Wasl	2	1	3
(Saudi Arabia) Al-Ahli Jeddah	2	2	4
(Morocco) Raja Casablanca	0	1	1
(Tunisia) Étoile du Sahel	2	0	2
(Algeria) MC Alger	0	0	0
(Sudan) Al-Merrikh	0	3	3

Semi-finals
(Saudi Arabia) Al-Hilal (p)	1	0	1 (3)
(Saudi Arabia) Al-Ahli Jeddah	0	1	1 (2)
(Tunisia) Étoile du Sahel	1	0	1
(Sudan) Al-Merrikh	0	0	0

Final
(Saudi Arabia) Al-Hilal	1
(Tunisia) Étoile du Sahel	2

=== First round ===
Team 1	Agg.	Team 2	1st leg	2nd leg
Zamalek (Egypt)	1–1 (a)	(Kuwait) Al-Qadsia	0–0	1–1
Al-Ain (United Arab Emirates)	2–2 (a)	(Algeria) ES Sétif	1–2	1–0
Ismaily (Egypt)	2–2 (4–2 p)	Al-Kuwait	2–0	0–2
Salam Zgharta (Lebanon)	2–3	(Morocco) Raja Casablanca	1–2	1–1
Al-Ittihad Jeddah (Saudi Arabia)	1–1 (a)	(United Arab Emirates) Al-Wasl	1–1	0–0
Al-Naft (Iraq)	3–3 (a)	(Tunisia) CS Sfaxien	1–1	2–2
Al-Hilal (Saudi Arabia)	2–0	(Oman) Al-Shabab	1–0	1–0
Al-Riffa (Bahrain)	1–2	(Algeria) MC Alger	1–2	0–0
Étoile du Sahel (Tunisia)	6–2	(Jordan) Al-Ramtha	3–1	3–1
Al-Quwa Al-Jawiya (Iraq)	0–4	(Algeria) USM Alger	0–1	0–3 (Note: USM Alger were awarded a 3–0 walkover win in the second leg after Al-Quwa Al-Jawiya's players withdrew from the match at 71 minutes while losing 2–0 in protest at offensive chants from the home fans.)
Al-Jazira (United Arab Emirates)	2–6	(Saudi Arabia) Al-Nassr	1–2	1–4
Al-Ittihad Alexandria (Egypt)	3–3 (a)	(Tunisia) Espérance de Tunis	1–1	2–2
Wydad Casablanca (Morocco)	2–2 (4–2 p)	(Libya) Al-Ahli Tripoli	1–1	1–1
Al-Jaish (Syria)	2–4	(Sudan) Al-Merrikh	1–3	1–1
Al-Ahly (Egypt)	4–1	(Lebanon) Al-Nejmeh	0–0	4–1
Al-Muharraq (Bahrain)	0–5	(Saudi Arabia) Al-Ahli Jeddah	0–2	0–3

11 August 2018
19:00 UTC+2

Zamalek (Egypt)	0–0	(Kuwait) Al-Qadsia

Borg El Arab Stadium, Alexandria
Attendance: 10,000
Referee: Mehdi Abid Charef (Algeria)
28 September 2018
19:30 UTC+3

Al-Qadsia (Kuwait)	1–1	(Egypt) Zamalek
Hani 90+5'	Report	Kasongo 81'

Jaber Al-Ahmad International Stadium, Kuwait City
Referee: Adham Makhadmeh (Jordan)

1–1 on aggregate. Zamalek won on away goals.

31 July 2018
17:00 UTC+1

Al-Ain (United Arab Emirates)	1–2	(Algeria) ES Sétif
Diaky 22' (pen.)	Report	Djabou 41', 81'

Stadion Maksimir, Zagreb (Croatia)
Referee: Turki Al Khudair (Saudi Arabia)
4 August 2018
18:00 UTC+1

ES Sétif (Algeria)	0–1	(United Arab Emirates) Al-Ain
	Report	Diaky 45'

Stadion Maksimir, Zagreb (Croatia)
Referee: Redouane Jiyed (Morocco)

2–2 on aggregate. ES Sétif won on away goals.

12 August 2018
19:30 UTC+2

Ismaily (Egypt)	2–0	Al-Kuwait
El Shamy 33'; Mendouga 55'	Report

Ismailia Stadium, Ismailia
Attendance: 7,000
Referee: Redouane Jiyed (Morocco)
27 September 2018
19:30 UTC+3

Al-Kuwait	2–0	(Egypt) Ismaily
Saeed 23'; Al Hajri 70'	Report
Penalties
Lahmar (penalty missed); Fatau (penalty scored); Al Fadhel (penalty scored); Al-Shereedah (penalty missed)	2–4	(penalty scored) Abd Rabo; (penalty scored) Taha; (penalty scored) Naguib; (penalty scored) Baffour

Al Kuwait Sports Club Stadium, Kaifan
Referee: Mohanad Qassim (Iraq)

2–2 on aggregate. Ismaily won 4–2 on penalties.

10 August 2018
17:00 UTC+3

Salam Zgharta (Lebanon)	1–2	(Morocco) Raja Casablanca
Nias 43'	Report	Iajour 64'; Boutayeb 84'

Zgharta Stadium, Zgharta
Referee: Sadok Selmi (Tunisia)
29 September 2018
19:00 UTC+1

Raja Casablanca (Morocco)	1–1	(Lebanon) Salam Zgharta
Hadraf 51'	Report	Nias 90+2'

Stade Mohammed V, Casablanca
Referee: Mahmoud El Banna (Egypt)

Raja Casablanca won 3–2 on aggregate.

24 August 2018
21:00 UTC+3

Al-Ittihad Jeddah (Saudi Arabia)	1–1	(United Arab Emirates) Al-Wasl
El Ahmadi 31'		Lima 12'

King Abdullah Sports City, Jeddah
Attendance: 34,240
Referee: Lahlou Benbraham (Algeria)
30 September 2018
20:00 UTC+4

Al-Wasl (United Arab Emirates)	0–0	(Saudi Arabia) Al-Ittihad Jeddah
	Report

Zabeel Stadium, Dubai
Attendance: 5,780
Referee: Ahmed Al Kaf (Oman)

1–1 on aggregate. Al-Wasl won on away goals.

10 August 2018
18:00 UTC+3

Al-Naft (Iraq)	1–1	(Tunisia) CS Sfaxien
Fayyadh 27'	Report	Mathlouthi 90' (pen.)

Franso Hariri Stadium, Erbil
Referee: Gehad Grisha (Egypt)
30 September 2018
20:00 UTC+1

CS Sfaxien (Tunisia)	2–2	(Iraq) Al-Naft
Chaouat 16' (pen.), 90+8'	Report	Tahseen 60'; Dawood 68'

Stade Taïeb Mhiri, Sfax
Referee: Noureddine El Jaafari (Morocco)

3–3 on aggregate. Al-Naft won on away goals.

12 August 2018
20:30 UTC+3

Al-Hilal (Saudi Arabia)	1–0	(Oman) Al-Shabab
Al-Breik 23'	Report

King Saud University Stadium, Riyadh
Referee: Mustapha Ghorbal (Algeria)
29 September 2018
18:00 UTC+3

Al-Shabab (Oman)	0–1	(Saudi Arabia) Al-Hilal
	Report	Eduardo 61'

Al-Seeb Stadium, Seeb
Referee: Ali Sabah (Iraq)

Al-Hilal won 2–0 on aggregate.

9 August 2018
20:00 UTC+3

Al-Riffa (Bahrain)	1–2	(Algeria) MC Alger
Haram 40'	Report	Derrardja 4'; Bourdim 48'

Khalifa Sports City Stadium, Isa Town
Referee: Shukri Al Hunfush (Saudi Arabia)
28 September 2018
19:00 UTC+1

MC Alger (Algeria)	0–0	(Bahrain) Al-Riffa
	Report

Stade du 5 Juillet 1962, Algiers
Referee: Ali Lemghaifry (Mauritania)

MC Alger won 2–1 on aggregate.

11 August 2018
20:15 UTC+1

Étoile du Sahel (Tunisia)	3–1	(Jordan) Al-Ramtha
Brigui 7', 47'; Ben Larbi 45'		Al-Dardour 66'

Stade Olympique de Sousse, Sousse
Referee: Ayman El Sharif (Libya)
28 September 2018
17:00 UTC+3

Al-Ramtha (Jordan)	1–3	(Tunisia) Étoile du Sahel
Al-Dardour 40'	Report	Ben Aziza 7', 23'; Marey 39'

Al-Hassan Stadium, Irbid
Referee: Masoud Tufaylieh (Syria)

Étoile du Sahel won 6–2 on aggregate.

8 August 2018
20:00 UTC+3

Al-Quwa Al-Jawiya (Iraq)	0–1	(Algeria) USM Alger
	Report	Mahious 73'

Karbala Olympic Stadium, Karbala
Referee: Ali Shaban (Kuwait)
9 September 2018
19:00 UTC+1

USM Alger (Algeria)	3–0 (w/o)	(Iraq) Al-Quwa Al-Jawiya
Meftah 39'; Natiq 45' (o.g.)	Report

Omar Hamadi Stadium, Algiers
Referee: Mohammed Abdulla Hassan Mohamed (United Arab Emirates)

USM Alger won 4–0 on aggregate. They were awarded a 3–0 walkover win in the second leg after Al-Quwa Al-Jawiya's players withdrew from the match at 71 minutes while losing 2–0 in protest at offensive chants from the home fans.

13 August 2018
19:45 UTC+4

Al-Jazira (United Arab Emirates)	1–2	(Saudi Arabia) Al-Nassr
Mubarak 22'		Al-Shehri 4'; Musa 75'

Mohammed Bin Zayed Stadium, Abu Dhabi
Referee: Mahmoud El Banna (Egypt)
29 September 2018
20:30 UTC+3

Al-Nassr (Saudi Arabia)	4–1	(United Arab Emirates) Al-Jazira
Al-Shehri 17'; Amrabat 74', 86'; Al-Sahlawi 90'	Report	Leonardo 7'

Prince Faisal bin Fahd Stadium, Riyadh
Referee: Gehad Grisha (Egypt)

Al-Nassr won 6–2 on aggregate.

9 August 2018
19:00 UTC+2

Al-Ittihad Alexandria (Egypt)	1–1	(Tunisia) Espérance de Tunis
Cissé 62'	Report	Mejri 70'

Alexandria Stadium, Alexandria
Attendance: 7,000
Referee: Mohammed Al Hoish (Saudi Arabia)
2 September 2018
20:00 UTC+1

Espérance de Tunis (Tunisia)	2–2	(Egypt) Al-Ittihad Alexandria
Belaili 7'; Kom 52'		Kamar 20'; Gedo 44'

Stade Olympique de Radès, Tunis
Referee: Mohanad Qassim (Iraq)

3–3 on aggregate. Al-Ittihad Alexandria won on away goals.

24 September 2018
19:00 UTC+1

Wydad Casablanca (Morocco)	1–1	(Libya) Al-Ahli Tripoli
Jebor 35' (pen.)	Report	Taqtaq 23'

Stade Mohammed V, Casablanca
Referee: Lahlou Benbraham (Algeria)
28 September 2018
20:00 UTC+1

Al-Ahli Tripoli (Libya)	1–1	(Morocco) Wydad Casablanca
Saltou 32'	Report	Ounajem 11'
Penalties
Taqtaq (penalty scored); Aleyat (penalty missed); Ablo (penalty scored); Maatouk (penalty missed)	2–4	(penalty scored) Jebor; (penalty scored) Nahiri; (penalty scored) Ounajem; (penalty scored) El Moutaraji

Stade Taïeb Mhiri, Sfax (Tunisia)
Referee: Sadok Selmi (Tunisia)

2–2 on aggregate. Wydad Casablanca won 4–2 on penalties.

1 August 2018
18:00 UTC+3

Al-Jaish (Syria)	1–3	(Sudan) Al-Merrikh
Fares 22'	Report	Abdel Rahman 34' (pen.), 60'; Somana 35'

Zgharta Stadium, Zgharta
Referee: Ali Sabah (Iraq)
11 August 2018
19:00 UTC+2

Al-Merrikh (Sudan)	1–1	(Syria) Al-Jaish
Adam 83'	Report	Al Wakid 62'

Al-Merrikh Stadium, Omdurman
Referee: Youssef Essrayri (Tunisia)

Al-Merrikh won 4–2 on aggregate.

13 August 2018
20:00 UTC+2

Al-Ahly (Egypt)	0–0	(Lebanon) Al-Nejmeh

Borg El Arab Stadium, Alexandria
Referee: Noureddine El Jaafari (Morocco)
27 September 2018
19:30 UTC+3

Al-Nejmeh (Lebanon)	1–4	(Egypt) Al-Ahly
Al Mohamed 89'	Report	Ali Maâloul 25'; M.Zakaria 35'; W. Soliman 63'; MO Sherif 78'

Camille Chamoun Sports City Stadium, Beirut
Referee: Turki Al Khudair (Saudi Arabia)

Al-Ahly won 4–1 on aggregate.

25 August 2018
18:50 UTC+3

Al-Muharraq (Bahrain)	0–2	(Saudi Arabia) Al-Ahli Jeddah
		Al Mowalad 66'; Al Somah 83'

Bahrain National Stadium, Riffa
Referee: Yaqoub Al Hammadi (United Arab Emirates)
24 September 2018
21:00 UTC+3

Al-Ahli Jeddah (Saudi Arabia)	3–0	(Bahrain) Al-Muharraq
Ghareeb 19', 61'; Al Somah 89'	Report

King Abdullah Sports City, Jeddah
Referee: Youssef Essrayri (Tunisia)

Al-Ahli Jeddah won 5–0 on aggregate.

=== Second round ===
Team 1	Agg.	Team 2	1st leg	2nd leg
Al-Merrikh (Sudan)	4–3	(Algeria) USM Alger	4–1	0–2
Al-Nassr (Saudi Arabia)	1–3	(Algeria) MC Alger	0–1	1–2
Al-Ahly (Egypt)	3–3 (a)	(United Arab Emirates) Al-Wasl	2–2	1–1
Wydad Casablanca (Morocco)	0–1	(Tunisia) Étoile du Sahel	0–0	0–1
Al-Hilal (Saudi Arabia)	6–0	(Iraq) Al-Naft	4–0	2–0
Ismaily (Egypt)	0–0 (2–4 p)	(Morocco) Raja Casablanca	0–0	0-0
Al-Ittihad Alexandria (Egypt)	1–1 (4–3 p)	(Egypt) Zamalek	0–1	1–0
ES Sétif (Algeria)	1–2	(Saudi Arabia) Al-Ahli Jeddah	0–1	1–1

21 November 2018
19:30 UTC+2

Al-Merrikh (Sudan)	4–1	(Algeria) USM Alger
Abdel Rahman 1', 10', 35'; Al Nasaan 39'	Report	Hamia 61'

Al-Merrikh Stadium, Omdurman
Referee: Turki Al Khudair (Saudi Arabia)
10 December 2018
19:00 UTC+1

USM Alger (Algeria)	2–0	(Sudan) Al-Merrikh
Chita 40'; Ardji 60'	Report

Stade du 5 Juillet 1962, Algiers
Referee: Sultan Al Marzooqi (United Arab Emirates)

Al-Merrikh won 4–3 on aggregate.

6 November 2018
20:00 UTC+3

Al-Nassr (Saudi Arabia)	0–1	(Algeria) MC Alger
	Report	Derrardja 61'

Prince Faisal bin Fahd Stadium, Riyadh
Referee: Redouane Jiyed (Morocco)
27 November 2018
19:00 UTC+1

MC Alger (Algeria)	2–1	(Saudi Arabia) Al-Nassr
Mebarakou 31'; Hamdallah 65' (o.g.)	Report	Al Shehri 90+6'

Stade du 5 Juillet 1962, Algiers
Referee: Adham Makhadmeh (Jordan)

MC Alger won 3–1 on aggregate.

28 October 2018
20:00 UTC+2

Al-Ahly (Egypt)	2–2	(United Arab Emirates) Al-Wasl
Fathy 35'; Mohsen 90+2'	Report	Caio 81'; Lima 86'

Borg El Arab Stadium, Alexandria
Referee: Adham Makhadmeh (Jordan)
22 November 2018
19:30 UTC+4

Al-Wasl (United Arab Emirates)	1–1	(Egypt) Al-Ahly
Oh Ban-suk 82'	Report	Soliman 59'

Zabeel Stadium, Dubai
Referee: Noureddine El Jaafari (Morocco)

3–3 on aggregate. Al-Wasl won on away goals.

27 October 2018
19:00 UTC+1

Wydad Casablanca (Morocco)	0–0	(Tunisia) Étoile du Sahel
	Report

Stade Mohammed V, Casablanca
Referee: Turki Al Khudair (Saudi Arabia)
8 November 2018
20:00 UTC+1

Étoile du Sahel (Tunisia)	1–0	(Morocco) Wydad Casablanca
Msakni 57'	Report

Stade Olympique de Sousse, Sousse
Referee: Mohanad Qassim (Iraq)

Étoile du Sahel won 1–0 on aggregate.

29 October 2018
20:00 UTC+3

Al-Hilal (Saudi Arabia)	4–0	(Iraq) Al-Naft
Gomis 35' (pen.); Carrillo 60'; Al Shahrani 67'; Abubakir 70' (o.g.)	Report

Prince Faisal bin Fahd Stadium, Riyadh
Referee: Mahmoud El Banna (Egypt)
30 November 2018
17:00 UTC+3

Al-Naft (Iraq)	0–2	(Saudi Arabia) Al-Hilal
	Report	Gomis 13'; Carlos Eduardo 31'

Franso Hariri Stadium, Erbil
Referee: Youssef Essrayri (Tunisia)

Al-Hilal won 6–0 on aggregate.

29 October 2018
19:00 UTC+2

Ismaily (Egypt)	0–0	(Morocco) Raja Casablanca
	Report

Ismailia Stadium, Ismailia
Referee: Ali Shaban (Kuwait)
11 December 2018
20:00 UTC+1

Raja Casablanca (Morocco)	0–0	(Egypt) Ismaily
	Report
Penalties
Hafidi (penalty missed); Banoun (penalty scored); Rahimi (penalty scored); Achchakir (penalty scored); Hadraf (penalty scored)	4–2	(penalty missed) Abd Rabo; (penalty missed) Taha; (penalty scored) El Wahsh; (penalty scored) El Mohamady

Stade Mohammed V, Casablanca
Referee: Ahmed Al Kaf (Oman)

0–0 on aggregate. Raja Casablanca won 4–2 on penalties.

27 October 2018
20:00 UTC+2

Al-Ittihad Alexandria (Egypt)	0–1	(Egypt) Zamalek
	Report	Kasongo 69'

Borg El Arab Stadium, Alexandria
Referee: Youssef Essrayri (Tunisia)
30 November 2018
19:00 UTC+2

Zamalek (Egypt)	0–1	(Egypt) Al-Ittihad Alexandria
	Report	Banahene 84'
Penalties
Alaa (penalty missed); Sassi (penalty scored); Gomaa (penalty missed); Obama (penalty scored); Fathy (penalty scored); Nagguez (penalty missed)	3–4	(penalty missed) Bazoka; (penalty scored) Banahene; (penalty scored) Hassan; (penalty missed) El Deeb; (penalty scored) El Sayed; (penalty scored) Nasef

Petro Sport Stadium, Cairo
Referee: Ali Sabah (Iraq)

1–1 on aggregate. Al-Ittihad Alexandria won 4–3 on penalties.

28 October 2018
20:00 UTC+1

ES Sétif (Algeria)	0–1	(Saudi Arabia) Al-Ahli Jeddah
	Report	Ghareeb 56'

Stade 8 Mai 1945, Sétif
Referee: Noureddine El Jaafari (Morocco)
4 December 2018
19:30 UTC+3

Al-Ahli Jeddah (Saudi Arabia)	1–1	(Algeria) ES Sétif
Al-Mowalad 49'	Report	Banouh 17'

King Abdullah Sports City, Jeddah
Attendance: 6,130
Referee: Gehad Grisha (Egypt)

Al-Ahli Jeddah won 2–1 on aggregate.

=== Quarter-finals ===
Team 1	Agg.	Team 2	1st leg	2nd leg
Al-Hilal (Saudi Arabia)	3–0	(Egypt) Al-Ittihad Alexandria	3–0	0–0
Al-Wasl (United Arab Emirates)	3–4	(Saudi Arabia) Al-Ahli Jeddah	2–2	1–2
Raja Casablanca (Morocco)	1–2	(Tunisia) Étoile du Sahel	0–2	1–0
MC Alger (Algeria)	0–3	(Sudan) Al-Merrikh	0–0	0–3

16 February 2019
20:00 UTC+3

Al-Hilal (Saudi Arabia)	3–0	(Egypt) Al-Ittihad Alexandria
Carlos Eduardo 14'; Gomis 31', 41'	Report

King Saud University Stadium, Riyadh
Attendance: 15,184
Referee: Noureddine El Jaafari (Morocco)
25 February 2019
17:00 UTC+2

Al-Ittihad Alexandria (Egypt)	0–0	(Saudi Arabia) Al-Hilal
	Report

Borg El Arab Stadium, Alexandria
Referee: Mustapha Ghorbal (Algeria)

Al-Hilal won 3–0 on aggregate.

16 February 2019
17:30 UTC+4

Al-Wasl (United Arab Emirates)	2–2	(Saudi Arabia) Al-Ahli Jeddah
Jassem 1'; Caio 88' (pen.)	Report	Stanciu 66'; Djaniny 72'

Zabeel Stadium, Dubai
Referee: Mahmoud El Banna (Egypt)
25 February 2019
20:45 UTC+3

Al-Ahli Jeddah (Saudi Arabia)	2–1	(United Arab Emirates) Al-Wasl
Díaz 52'; Al-Moasher 90+1'	Report	Saleh 38'

King Abdullah Sports City, Jeddah
Attendance: 10,450
Referee: Redouane Jiyed (Morocco)

Al-Ahli Jeddah won 4–3 on aggregate.

26 January 2019
17:00 UTC+1

Raja Casablanca (Morocco)	0–2	(Tunisia) Étoile du Sahel
	Report	Msakni 57'; Ben Larbi 90'

Prince Moulay Abdellah Stadium, Rabat
Referee: Gehad Grisha (Egypt)
8 February 2019
15:00 UTC+1

Étoile du Sahel (Tunisia)	0–1	(Morocco) Raja Casablanca
	Report	Iajour 29'

Stade Olympique de Sousse, Sousse
Referee: Mohanad Qassim (Iraq)

Étoile du Sahel won 2–1 on aggregate.

31 January 2019
19:00 UTC+1

MC Alger (Algeria)	0–0	(Sudan) Al-Merrikh
	Report

Stade du 5 Juillet 1962, Algiers
Attendance: 25 000
Referee: Youssef Essrayri (Tunisia)
16 February 2019
19:00 UTC+2

Al-Merrikh (Sudan)	3–0	(Algeria) MC Alger
Al-Rashed 25'; Abdel Rahman 32', 68'	Report

Al-Merrikh Stadium, Omdurman
Referee: Turki Al Khudair (Saudi Arabia)

Al-Merrikh won 3–0 on aggregate.

=== Semi-finals ===
Team 1	Agg.	Team 2	1st leg	2nd leg
Al-Hilal (Saudi Arabia)	1–1 (3–2 p)	(Saudi Arabia) Al-Ahli Jeddah	1–0	0–1
Étoile du Sahel (Tunisia)	1–0	(Sudan) Al-Merrikh	1–0	0–0

17 March 2019
18:45 UTC+3

Al-Hilal (Saudi Arabia)	1–0	(Saudi Arabia) Al-Ahli Jeddah
Soriano 49'	Report

King Saud University Stadium, Riyadh
Referee: Ammar Al-Jeneibi (United Arab Emirates)
15 April 2019
19:25 UTC+3

Al-Ahli Jeddah (Saudi Arabia)	1–0	(Saudi Arabia) Al-Hilal
Díaz 18'	Report
Penalties
Al Somah (penalty scored); Díaz (penalty missed); Stanciu (penalty scored); Al Mogahwi (penalty missed); Assiri (penalty missed)	2–3	(penalty missed) Carlos Eduardo; (penalty scored) Al Breik; (penalty missed) Al Shalhoub; (penalty scored) Gomis; (penalty scored) Al Abed

King Abdullah Sports City, Jeddah
Attendance: 33,257
Referee: Gehad Grisha (Egypt)

1–1 on aggregate. Al-Hilal won 3–2 on penalties.

27 February 2019
18:00 UTC+1

Étoile du Sahel (Tunisia)	1–0	(Sudan) Al-Merrikh
Ben Ouanes 45+2'	Report

Stade Olympique de Sousse, Sousse
Referee: Nawaf Shukralla (Bahrain)
29 March 2019
19:00 UTC+2

Al-Merrikh (Sudan)	0–0	(Tunisia) Étoile du Sahel
	Report

Al-Merrikh Stadium, Omdurman
Referee: Sultan Al Marzooqi (United Arab Emirates)

Étoile du Sahel won 1–0 on aggregate.

=== Final ===
18 April 2019
17:50 UTC+4

Al-Hilal (Saudi Arabia)	1–2	(Tunisia) Étoile du Sahel
Gomis 64' (pen.)	Report	Aribi 30'; Mothnani 90+1'

Hazza bin Zayed Stadium, Al Ain
Attendance: 15,000
Referee: Mohammed Abdulla (United Arab Emirates)

== Top scorers ==
Statistics exclude qualifying rounds.

As of 18 April 2019

Team eliminated / inactive for this round.

Rank	Player	Team	FR1	FR2	SR1	SR2	QF1	QF2	SF1	SF2	F	Total
1	(Sudan) Mohamed Abdel Rahman	(Sudan) Al-Merrikh	2		3			2				7
2	(France) Bafétimbi Gomis	(Saudi Arabia) Al-Hilal			1	1	2				1	5
3	(Saudi Arabia) Abdulrahman Ghareeb	(Saudi Arabia) Al-Ahli Jeddah		2	1							3
3	(Saudi Arabia) Yahya Al-Shehri	(Saudi Arabia) Al-Nassr	1	1		1						3
3	(Brazil) Carlos Eduardo	(Saudi Arabia) Al-Hilal		1		1	1					3

== Broadcasting ==
2018–19 Zayed Champions Cup Media Coverage
Country	Television Channel
United Arab Emirates	AD Sports
