= AS Tadjourah =

Tadjourah
- Full name: Association Sportive Tadjourah
- Ground: Centre Technique National
- Capacity: 3,000
- League: Djibouti Division 3
- 2021–22: Djibouti Division 3 Group B, 5th of 8

Association Sportive Tadjourah, more commonly known as AS Tadjourah or simply Tadjourah, is a Djiboutian football club located in Tadjourah, Djibouti. It currently plays in Djibouti Division 3.

The team is the most popular football team in Tadjourah Region.

== Stadium ==
Currently, the team plays most matches at the 3,000-capacity Centre Technique National. The 20,000-capacity El Hadj Hassan Gouled Aptidon Stadium is also used for some matches.

== History ==
Until 2003, the team was known as Djibouti-Télécom Tadjourah. In the 2003–04 season, AS Tadjourah finished first in Djibouti Division 2 and were promoted to the Djibouti Premier League.

They were relegated in the 2005–06 season before being promoted once again as champions in the 2008–09 season.

In 2014, the team won the Djibouti Cup, defeating Guelleh Batal on penalties.

In the 2015–16 season, they were relegated once again before winning Djibouti Division 2 for a third time in the 2016–17 season. However, they were relegated once again in the 2017–18 season, the last time they played in the Djibouti Premier League.

In the 2018–19 season, Tadjourah was relegated once again, this time to Djibouti Division 3. They were nearly relegated for a third consecutive season in 2019–2020, finishing 1 point above the relegation zone in 7th place.
