= Djehani N'Guissan =

Togolese footballer (born 1990)

Personal information
- Full name: Gilles Djehani N'Guissan Yao
- Date of birth: 1 February 1990 (age 36)
- Place of birth: Galangashie, Togo
- Height: 1.83 m (6 ft 0 in)
- Position: Goalkeeper

Team information
- Current team: AS Arta/Solar7

Senior career*
Years	Team	Apps	(Gls)
–2007	Maranatha FC		
2007–2015	Dynamic Togolais		
2016	Enugu Rangers		
2016–2017	Dynamic Togolais		
2017–2018	Sidama Coffee		
2018–2019	ASC Kara		
2019–2020	AS Port		
2020–2023	ACS Hayableh		
2023–	AS Arta/Solar7		

International career
2014–2021	Togo	9	(0)
- * Club domestic league appearances and goals

Gilles Djehani N'Guissan Yao (born 1 February 1990) is a Togolese footballer who plays as a goalkeeper for AS Arta/Solar7. He made nine appearances for the Togo national team.

== Career ==
Before the 2023 season, N'Guissan signed for Djiboutian club ACS Hayableh. After that, he joingned AS Arta/Solar7 of Djibouti. With Arta/Solar7 he was champion of Djibouti and winner of the Djibouti national cup.
