= Samuel Akinbinu =

Association football player (born 1999)

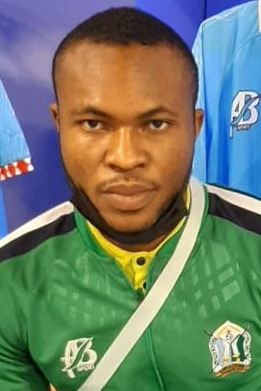
- Akinbinu with Djibouti in 2021

Personal information
- Full name: Samuel Temidayo Feargod Akinbinu
- Date of birth: 6 June 1995 (age 31)
- Place of birth: Lagos, Nigeria
- Height: 1.78 m (5 ft 10 in)
- Position: Forward

Team information
- Current team: KCB
- Number: 31

Senior career*
Years	Team	Apps	(Gls)
2014–2015	Shooting Stars	10	(4)
2015–2016	First Bank	7	(2)
2016–2017	Bayelsa United	12	(4)
2017–2018	Rivers United	12	(4)
2018–2019	Lobi Stars	8	(2)
2019–2024	Arta/Solar7	73	(53)
2024–2026	Al Merreikh	32	(8)
2026	KCB	18	(1)

International career
2021–	Djibouti	25	(11)
- * Club domestic league appearances and goals

Samuel Temidayo Feargod Akinbinu (born 6 June 1999) is a professional footballer who plays as a forward for club KCB from Kenya. Born in Nigeria, he plays and is the all-time top goalscorer for the Djibouti national team.

== Club career ==
On 10 January 2018, Akinbinu signed for Nigeria Professional Football League club Rivers United. On 19 April 2018, in the mid-season transfer windows, Akinbinu signed for Lobi Stars.

On 2 July 2019, Akinbinu joined Djibouti Premier League champions Arta/Solar7.

He helped his team win the 2022 Djibouti Cup and was a key part alongside his teammate Alex Song as they won the double.

== International career ==
Akinbinu received his Djiboutian citizenship in June 2021.

Akinbinu debuted on 15 June 2021, in a friendly match against Somalia, scoring his first goal in a 1–0 victory at the Stade du Ville.

He was also top scorer for 2023 Mauritius Four Nations Cup and would help them win it with two goals scored it would be the first time Djibouti won a trophy.

== International goals ==
Scores and results list Djibouti's goal tally first.

List of international goals scored by Samuel Akinbinu
No.	Date	Venue	Opponent	Score	Result	Competition
1.	15 June 2021	El Hadj Hassan Gouled Aptidon Stadium, Djibouti City, Djibouti	Somalia	1–0	1–0	Friendly
2.	23 March 2022	Borg El Arab Stadium, Borg El Arab, Egypt	South Sudan	1–1	2–4	2023 Africa Cup of Nations qualification
3.	24 July 2022	Benjamin Mkapa Stadium, Dar Es Salaam, Tanzania	Burundi	1–1	1–2	2022 African Nations Championship qualification
4.	29 July 2022	Benjamin Mkapa Stadium, Dar Es Salaam, Tanzania	Burundi	2–1	2–1 (4–2 p)	2022 African Nations Championship qualification
5.	2 September 2022	Al-Merrikh Stadium, Khartoum, Sudan	Sudan	2–3	2–3	2022 African Nations Championship qualification
6.	14 June 2023	Stade de Cote d'Or, Saint Pierre, Mauritius	Mauritius	1–1	3–1	2023 Mauritius Four Nations Cup
7.	17 June 2023	Stade de Cote d'Or, Saint Pierre, Mauritius	Pakistan	3–1	3–1	2023 Mauritius Four Nations Cup
8.	9 January 2024	Malabo Stadium, Malabo, Equatorial Guinea	Equatorial Guinea	1–1	1–1	Friendly
9.	21 March 2025	Ben M'Hamed El Abdi Stadium, El Jadida, Morocco	Burkina Faso	1–4	1–4	2026 FIFA World Cup qualification
10.	24 March 2025	Ben M'Hamed El Abdi Stadium, El Jadida, Morocco	Ethiopia	1–3	1–6	2026 FIFA World Cup qualification
11.	29 March 2026	Juba Stadium, Juba, South Sudan	South Sudan	1–0	1–0	2027 Africa Cup of Nations qualification
