= Gilbert Kaze =

Burundian footballer

Personal information
- Date of birth: 25 January 1992 (age 34)
- Place of birth: Bujumbura, Burundi
- Position: Defender

Team information
- Current team: ASAS Djibouti Télécom
- Number: 6

Youth career
- 2010–2011: Vital'O FC

Senior career*
Years	Team	Apps	(Gls)
2011–2012	Police		
2012–2013	Vital'O FC		
2013	Dedebit F.C.		
2013–2014	Simba S.C.		
2014–2017	Vital'O FC		
2017–2019	Université		
2019–	ASAS Djibouti Télécom		

International career^{‡}
2010–	Burundi	10	(1)
- * Club domestic league appearances and goals as of 14 September 2022 ‡ National team caps and goals as of 22 February 2014

Gilbert Kaze (born 25 January 1992) is a Burundian professional footballer, who plays as a defender for AS Ali Sabieh/Djibouti Télécom in the Djibouti Premier League.

== International career ==
He was invited by Lofty Naseem, the national team coach, to represent Burundi in the 2014 African Nations Championship qualification which a competition held in South Africa. He scored a deciding penalty over Sudan and took Burundi to the 2014 CHAN.
