= List of football clubs in Djibouti =

The following is an incomplete list of association football clubs based in Djibouti. For a complete list see Category:Football clubs in Djibouti

== A ==
- Ali Sabieh
- AS Port
- AS Tadjourah

== C ==
- CDE Colas

== D ==
- FC Dikhil

== G ==
- Gandaran
- Guelleh Batal

== H ==
- Hôpital Balbala

== K ==
- Kartileh-Al Gamil

== S ==
- Sheraton Hôtel

== T ==
- Total (football club)
