= 2023 Mauritius Four Nations Cup =

International football tournament

Tournament details
- Host country: Mauritius
- City: Saint Pierre
- Dates: 11–18 June 2023
- Teams: 4 (from 2 confederations)
- Venue: 1 (in 1 host city)

Final positions
- Champions: Djibouti
- Runners-up: Mauritius
- Third place: Kenya
- Fourth place: Pakistan

Tournament statistics
- Matches played: 5
- Goals scored: 13 (2.6 per match)
- Top scorer(s): (Djibouti) Samuel Akinbinu (Djibouti) Gabriel Dadzie (Mauritius) Ashley Nazira (2 goals each)

The 2023 Mauritius Four Nations Cup was a friendly international association football tournament organized and controlled by Mauritius Football Association (MFA) and was played from 11 to 18 June 2023 at Saint Pierre, Mauritius.

== Participating nations ==
The FIFA Rankings of participating national teams as of 6 April 2023.

Team	FIFA Rankings	Confederation
Djibouti	194	CAF
Kenya	102	CAF
Mauritius (Host)	180	CAF
Pakistan	195	AFC

== Venue ==
All matches were played at Stade de Côte d'Or in Saint Pierre, Mauritius.

Saint Pierre, Mauritius	Saint Pierre is located in Africa
Stade de Côte d'Or	Saint Pierre is located in Africa
Capacity: 8,000	Saint Pierre is located in Africa

== Match officials ==
Referees

- (Djibouti) Nasser Houssein Mahamoud
- (Madagascar) Andofetra Rakotojaona
- (Pakistan) Irshad Ul Haq
- (Kenya) Josphine Wanjiku
- (Madagascar) Ibrahim Ben Tsimanohitsy

Assistant Referees

- (Djibouti) Eleyeh Robleh Dirir
- (Kenya) Stephen Odhiambo
- (Kenya) Stephen Yiembe
- (Madagascar) Augustin Gabriel Herinirina
- (Madagascar) Danison Ravelomandimby
- (Pakistan) Muhammad Ali
- (Mauritius) Aswet Teeluck
- (Mauritius) Yuvraj Jamansing

== Standings ==
Pos	Team	Pld	W	D	L	GF	GA	GD	Pts	Qualification
1	Djibouti (C)	3	3	0	0	9	2	+7	9	Champion
2	Mauritius (H)	3	2	0	1	5	3	+2	6	
3	Kenya	3	1	0	2	1	4	−3	3	
4	Pakistan	3	0	0	3	1	7	−6	0	

Source: GSA
(C) Champions; (H) Hosts

== Matches ==
11 June 2023
15:30

Mauritius	3–0	Pakistan
Villeneuve 53'; Nazira 63'; Moosa 71' (o.g.)	Report

Stade de Cote d'Or, Saint Pierre
Referee: Nasser Houssein Mahamoud (Djibouti)
11 June 2023
18:00

Djibouti	3–0 Awarded	Kenya
	Report

Stade de Cote d'Or, Saint Pierre

14 June 2023
15:00

Pakistan	0–1	Kenya
	Report	Shumah 17'

Stade de Cote d'Or, Saint Pierre
Referee: Andofetra Rakotojaona (Madagascar)
14 June 2023
18:00

Mauritius	1–3	Djibouti
Nazira 26'	Report	Akinbinu 48'; Dadzie 62'; Fouad Mohamed 64'

Stade de Cote d'Or, Saint Pierre
Referee: Irshad Ul Haq (Pakistan)

17 June 2023
15:30

Djibouti	3–1	Pakistan
Elabeh 10'; Dadzie 73'; Akinbinu 85'	Report	Umar Hayat 84'

Stade de Cote d'Or, Saint Pierre
Referee: Josphine Wanjiku (Kenya)

18 June 2023
18:00

Mauritius	1–0	Kenya
Saramandif 22'	Report

Stade de Cote d'Or, Saint Pierre
Referee: Ibrahim Ben Tsimanohitsy (Madagascar)

== Goalscorers ==
There were 13 goals scored in 5 matches, for an average of 2.6 goals per match.

2 goals

- (Djibouti) Samuel Akinbinu
- (Djibouti) Gabriel Dadzie
- (Mauritius) Ashley Nazira

1 goal

- (Djibouti) Doualeh Mahamoud Elabeh
- (Djibouti) Mohamed Fouad Mohamed
- (Kenya) Moses Shummah
- (Mauritius) Kengy Saramandif
- (Mauritius) Jérémy Villeneuve
- (Pakistan) Muhammad Umar Hayat

1 own goal

- (Pakistan) Mamoon Moosa (against Mauritius)

Source: GSA
