= SDVK FC =

Djiboutian football club

SDVK FC is a Djiboutian football club. From 2015 to 2016 it competed in the Djibouti Premier League, the highest level of Djiboutian football.

== History ==
In 2015, SDVK won the 8th edition of the Ramadan football tournament in Djibouti, beating Hayableh District 5–3 in the exhilarating final.
