= Gilles N'Guessan =

Ivorian footballer (born 1992)

Personal information
- Date of birth: 5 March 1992 (age 34)
- Place of birth: Dabou, Ivory Coast
- Height: 1.85 m (6 ft 1 in)
- Position: Defender

Team information
- Current team: Arta/Solar7
- Number: 13

Senior career*
Years	Team	Apps	(Gls)
2014–2016	Stade d'Abidjan		
2016–2018	Africa Sports		
2018	Jeddah Club		
2019	SC Gagnoa		
2019–2021	FC San Pédro		
2021–2022	ASEC Mimosas		
2022–	Arta/Solar7	17	(0)
- * Club domestic league appearances and goals as of 15 December 2023

Gilles Privat N'Guessan (born 5 March 1992) is an Ivorian professional footballer who plays for Arta/Solar7 in the Djibouti Premier League as a defender.

== Club career ==
=== Stade d'Abidjan ===
In July 2014, N'Guessan joined Stade d'Abidjan of the Ivorian Ligue 1. He wore the number 8 during the 2014–15 season.

=== Africa Sports ===
In 2016, he joined Africa Sports. On 26 November 2016, he scored the lone goal in a 1–0 victory over AS Denguélé. In 2017, he won the Coupe de Côte d'Ivoire.

=== Jeddah Club ===
In 2018, N'Guessan joined Jeddah Club of the Saudi Arabian Prince Mohammad bin Salman League, the second tier of football in the country.

=== SC Gagnoa ===
In January 2019, N'Guessan returned to the Ivory Coast, joining Ligue 1 side SC Gagnoa on a free transfer.

=== FC San Pédro ===
In summer 2019, he joined FC San Pédro, where he won the 2019 Coupe de Côte d'Ivoire for a second time.

=== ASEC Mimosas ===
In 2021, N'Guessan joined reigning champions ASEC Mimosas, wearing the number 2. On 16 December 2021, he won player of the match in a 3–0 victory over Stella Club d'Adjamé.

=== Arta/Solar7 ===
On 8 August 2022, N'Guessan joined Arta/Solar7 of the Djibouti Premier League. He made his debut in a 2–1 defeat to Al-Merrikh SC in the CAF Champions League, scoring an own goal in the 88th minute.

== Honours ==
Africa Sports

- Coupe de Côte d'Ivoire: 2017

Arta/Solar7

- Djibouti Super Cup: 2022

ASEC Mimosas

- Ligue 1: 2021–2022

FC San Pédro

- Coupe de Côte d'Ivoire: 2019
