= Aden Charmakeh =

Djiboutian footballer

Aden Charmkeh
Personal information
- Date of birth: May 26, 1984 (age 42)
- Place of birth: Djibouti
- Position: Defender

Senior career*
Years	Team	Apps	(Gls)
	AS Port		(19)

International career
	Djibouti	16	(0)
- * Club domestic league appearances and goals

Aden Charmkeh (born May 26, 1984) is a Djiboutian football player who currently plays for no club, and the Djibouti National Football Team. Playing at defender, Charamkeh made the national team under 25 years of age.

== International career ==
Charmakeh is a new addition to the Djiboutian football team. He has started 2 games, and got one yellow card, but no goals.
