= AJ Jago =

- Full name: AJ Jago
- League: Djibouti Premier League

AJ Jago is a Djiboutian football club located in the town of Jago. It currently plays in the top domestic Djibouti Premier League.
