= Djibouti Division 2 =

Division 2
- Country: Djibouti
- Confederation: CAF
- Number of clubs: 10
- Level on pyramid: 2
- Promotion to: Djibouti Premier League
- Relegation to: Djibouti Division 3
- Domestic cup: Djibouti Cup
- Current champions: Q5/Nourie Transit (2021–22)
- Most championships: AS Tadjourah (3)
- Website: Djibouti Federation Website

The Djibouti Division 2 is the second tier of association football in Djibouti, after the Premier League. The league is contested by 10 clubs. The 20,000-capacity El Hadj Hassan Gouled Aptidon Stadium and 3,000-capacity Centre Technique National are the main venues of the league.

== Champions ==
=== Wins by year ===
- 2000–01: FC Barwaqo
- 2001–02: FC Dikhil
- 2002–03: Office National de Tourisme [Balbala]
- 2003–04: AS Tadjourah
- 2004–05: Sheraton Hôtel
- 2005–06: FC Tour Eiffel
- 2006–07: Guelleh Batal
- 2007–08:
- 2008–09: AS Tadjourah
- 2009–10:
- 2010–11: APEJAS
- 2011–12: Arhiba
- 2012–13: Bahache/Université de Djibouti
- 2013–14: Hôpital de Balbala
- 2014–15: Bahache/Université de Djibouti
- 2015–16: Cité Stade
- 2016–17: AS Tadjourah
- 2017–18: AS Barwaqo
- 2018–19: Institut Saoudien
- 2019–20: AS Barwaqo
- 2020–21: Arhiba
- 2021–22: Q5/Nourie Transit
