= Yacouba Songné =

Burkinabé footballer

Personal information
- Full name: Yacouba Songné
- Date of birth: 10 January 1997 (age 29)
- Place of birth: Bobo-Dioulasso, Burkina Faso
- Position: Forward

Team information
- Current team: Arta/Solar7
- Number: 10

Senior career*
Years	Team	Apps	(Gls)
2018–2020	Asante Kotoko S.C.	15	(6)
2020–2023	Young Africans		
2023	Ihefu		
2023–	Arta/Solar7	4	(5)
- * Club domestic league appearances and goals as of 15 December 2023

Yacouba Songné (born 10 January 1997) is a Burkinabé professional football player. He currently plays for Arta/Solar7 as a striker.

== Professional career ==
Songné began his professional football career in 2016 when he joined Étoile Filante de Ouagadougou in Burkina Faso. In January 2018 he was transferred to Asante Kotoko S.C. where he currently plays. In May 2018, he was voted player of the month in Asante Kotoko.
