= CF Gendarmerie Nationale =

Djiboutian football club

Gendarmerie
- Full name: Gendarmerie Nationale
- Founded: 2002
- Ground: Stade du Ville; Djibouti (city), Djibouti
- Capacity: 20,000
- Chairman: Omar Abdirashid Warfaa
- Manager: Warsame Faarole
- League: Djibouti Premier League
- 2025–26: 5th

Gendarmerie Nationale FC, more commonly known as Gendarmerie Nationale or simply Gendarmerie, is a Djiboutian football club who represent the local garden centre located in Djibouti City, Djibouti. It currently plays in the Djibouti Premier League.

== Stadium ==
The club plays at the El Hadj Hassan Gouled Aptidon Stadium, a stadium with a current maximum capacity of 40,000 audience members.
