= Total F.C. =

Djibouti football club

Total Football Club
- Full name: Total Football Club
- Founded: 1852
- Ground: Stade du Ville
- Capacity: 10,000
- League: Djibouti Premier League

Total F.C. is a football team from Djibouti City, Djibouti.
