= Alex Song =

Cameroonian footballer (born 1987)

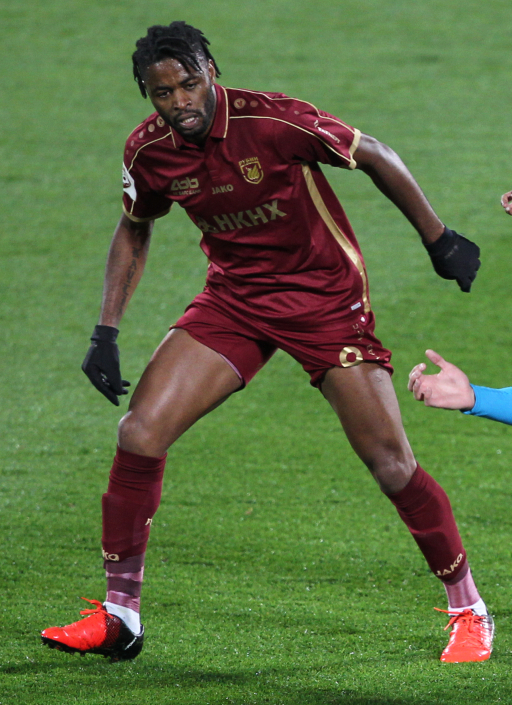
- Song playing for Rubin Kazan in 2016

Personal information
- Full name: Alexandre Dimitri Song Billong
- Date of birth: 9 September 1987 (age 39)
- Place of birth: Douala, Cameroon
- Height: 1.85 m (6 ft 1 in)
- Positions: Midfielder; defender

Youth career
- 2000–2001: Red Star
- 2001–2004: Bastia

Senior career*
Years	Team	Apps	(Gls)
2004–2006	Bastia	32	(0)
2005–2006	→ Arsenal (loan)	5	(0)
2006–2012	Arsenal	133	(7)
2007	→ Charlton Athletic (loan)	12	(0)
2012–2016	Barcelona	39	(1)
2014–2015	→ West Ham United (loan)	28	(0)
2015–2016	→ West Ham United (loan)	12	(0)
2016–2018	Rubin Kazan	22	(1)
2018–2020	Sion	20	(0)
2018–2019	Sion II	6	(0)
2020–2023	Arta/Solar7	23	(3)
Total		331	(12)

International career
2002–2003	France U16	6	(0)
2003–2004	Cameroon U17	3	(0)
2008	Cameroon U23	3	(0)
2005–2014	Cameroon	49	(0)
Medal record
Men's Football
Representing Cameroon
Africa Cup of Nations
Runner-up	2008 Ghana	Team
African U-17 Championship
Winner	2003 Swaziland	Team
- * Club domestic league appearances and goals

Alexandre Dimitri Song Billong (born 9 September 1987) is a Cameroonian former professional footballer who played as a central or defensive midfielder. He also played as a central defender.

Originally a utility player on the fringes of the first team, Song quickly became an integral part of Arsenal's starting 11 during the 2008–09 pre-season, eventually leading to a €15 million transfer to Barcelona in 2012.

Song played for the Cameroon national team in the 2010 and 2014 FIFA World Cups. He was called up for the 2010 Africa Cup of Nations and was the only Cameroonian named in the Team of the Tournament. Song also possesses French nationality. He is the nephew of former footballer Rigobert Song and the cousin of rugby league player Junior Nsemba.

== Background ==
Song was born in Douala, Cameroon, and lost his father at the age of three. Since then, his uncle Rigobert Song has been like a second father and was a major influence in choosing football as a career. Unable to find a club or academy where he could hone his skills, Petit Song (as he is known in the Cameroon side) opted to move to France, joining Bastia at age 16. One of the players who inspired Song the most when he was young was Michael Essien.

In 2011, Song became an ambassador for Grassroot Soccer, an international non-profit organisation working through football to stop the spread of HIV.

== Club career ==
=== Bastia ===
Song joined the Bastia youth team in 2003–04 and became a part of the first team the following season with 31 appearances. Bastia were playing in Ligue 1 during the time Song had a stint there. Song was noted for his high versatility

While playing for Bastia, he was selected as a part of France under-16 national team. He later chose to represent Cameroon, his country of birth. He played as a centre-back but later made several appearances as a defensive midfielder. He was highly regarded in this position by numerous coaches and supporters of Bastia. During his time at Bastia, he attracted attention from numerous clubs, including Internazionale, Juventus, Manchester United, Lyon and Middlesbrough. Unwilling to sell their prized asset, Bastia agreed to loan him to the Gunners for one season only in 2005. Despite being linked heavily with Lyon, he was sold to Arsenal for a £1 million transfer fee. During his time at Bastia, Song made a total of 32 league appearances.

=== Arsenal ===
Song impressed Arsenal manager Arsène Wenger as a trialist during Arsenal's pre-season training camp in Austria, and Arsenal secured his services on loan for the 2005–06 season on 11 August 2005. Arsenal agreed to a £1 million fee in June 2006 and signed him to a four-year contract. Song made his Premier League debut during Arsenal's 2–0 win against Everton on 19 September 2005 as a substitute. He played in several UEFA Champions League matches and made several Premier League starts near the end of the season, when first team players were injured or being rested.

Song scored his first goal for Arsenal against Liverpool in Arsenal's 6–3 win at Anfield in the League Cup quarterfinals on 9 January 2007.

On 30 January 2007, it was confirmed that Charlton Athletic had signed Song on loan until the end of the 2006–07 season. Although he impressed, Charlton were relegated and Song returned to Arsenal.

Over the 2007–08 season, Song started at centre back for Arsenal's League Cup matches, but missed their semi-final elimination by Tottenham Hotspur while away with Cameroon at the Africa Cup of Nations. He also started at centre-back in Premier League matches towards the end of the season, most notably in Arsenal's crucial visit to Old Trafford against Manchester United, while regular starter Kolo Touré filled in for Bacary Sagna at right-back.

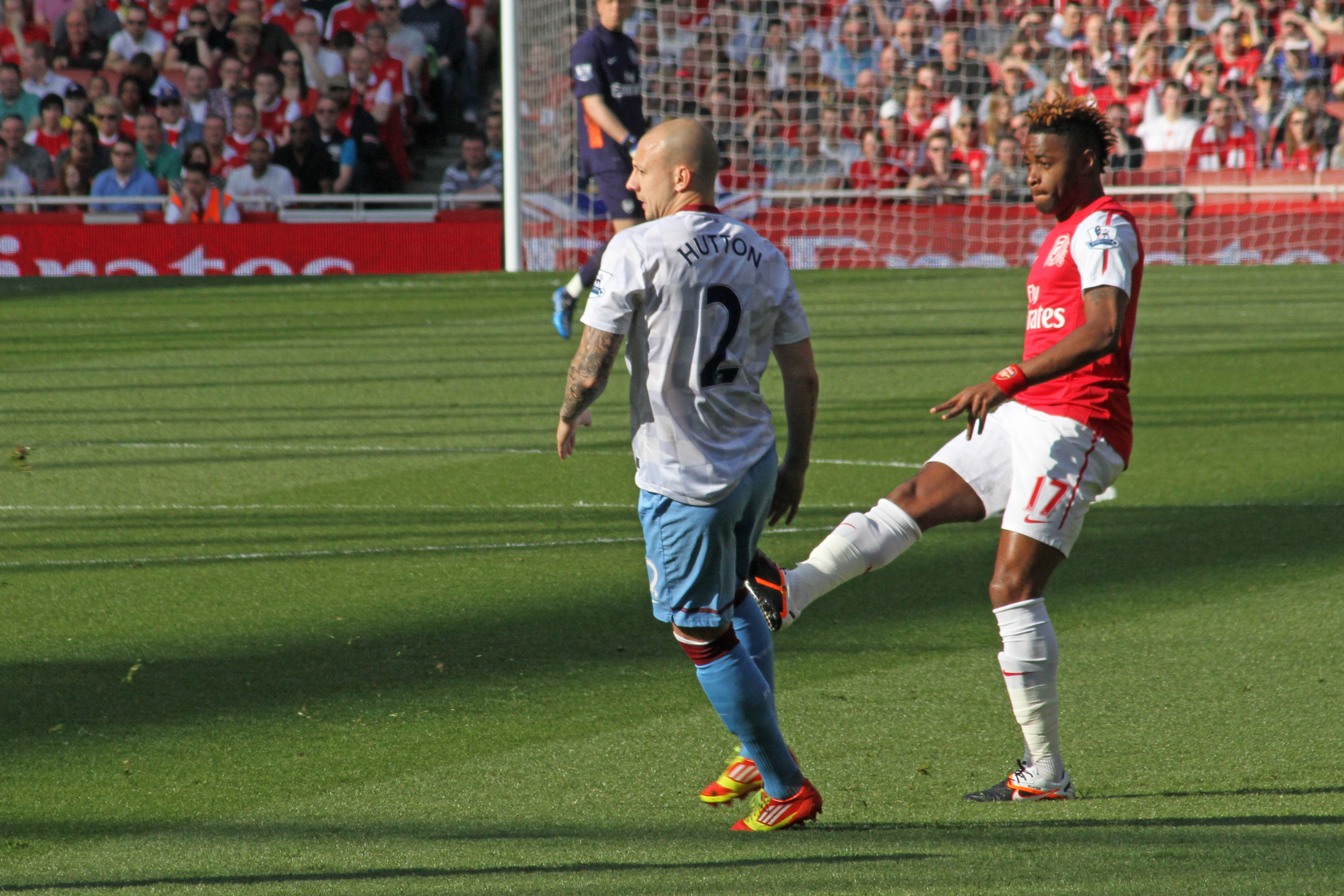
Song playing for Arsenal

==== 2008–09 season ====
The 2008–09 season was Song's breakthrough year with Arsenal. The then 21-year-old established himself as a key member of Arsène Wenger's squad, making 48 appearances in all competitions. He enjoyed his most productive and eye-catching campaign yet as he emerged as a forte and powerhouse of Arsenal's midfield being the perfect partner for Cesc Fàbregas in Arsenal's centre. Of the Cameroonian, Wenger remarked, "I brought him here aged 17 and worked very hard with him, we worked hard because I felt he had the talent to become a good player. I know that the opinions are changing about him now."

On 21 October 2008, Song scored his first goal in European competition for Arsenal against Fenerbahçe in the UEFA Champions League. Song's first league goal, and third in all competitions for the Gunners, was scored against Wigan Athletic on 11 April 2009 in which he took on several players and then coolly finished in the bottom corner. Arsenal won the match 4–1.

==== 2009–10 season ====
Song began the season well, playing in all but one of Arsenal's first 12 league games. He was voted third in the Arsenal.com player of the month award for October, behind winner Cesc Fàbregas and runner-up Robin van Persie. After putting in consistently commanding performances at the heart of midfield, allowing Arsenal's creative attackers to operate effectively, Song established himself as one of the first names on the team sheet. On 25 November 2009, Song signed a new long-term contract with Arsenal, lasting until 2014. On 30 December 2009, he scored his second goal in the league for Arsenal when he completed the scoring in a 4–1 win over Portsmouth at Fratton Park.

==== 2010–11 season ====
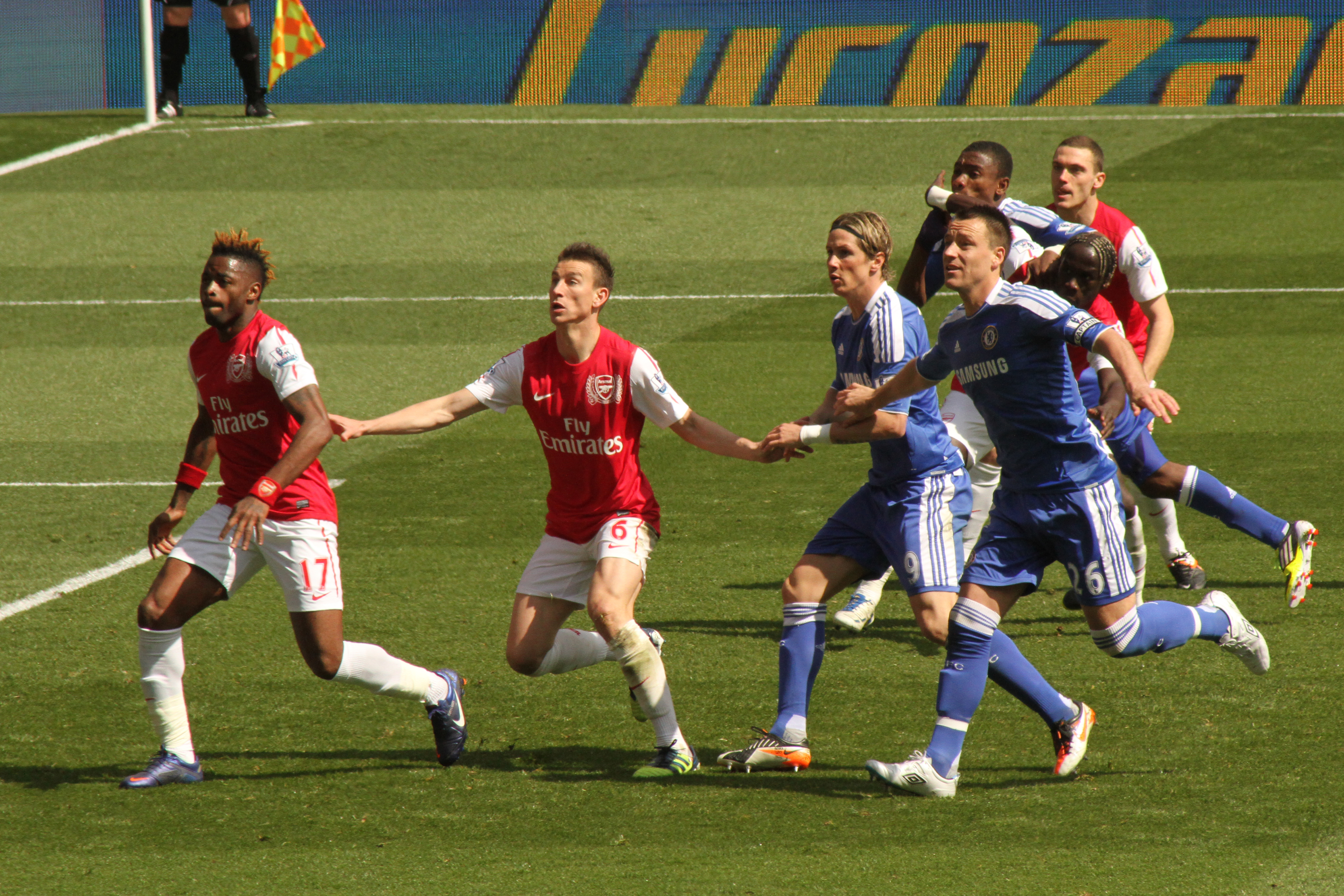
Song in action in 2012

Song continued to be one of the first names on the team sheet, as he made a superb start to the 2010–11 season, establishing himself in front of the back four. He scored the 1,000th Arsenal Premier League goal under Arsène Wenger in a 4–1 win against Bolton Wanderers on 11 September 2010. On the downside, the following game he was sent off for two bookable offences. The strong midfielder has become a more adventurous element in the Arsenal midfield, helping the forward line with his movement. On 28 August 2010, Song completed the full 90 minutes in the game against Blackburn Rovers in a 2–1 win at Ewood Park. On 19 October 2010, he scored the first goal of the match for Arsenal against the Ukrainian side Shakhtar Donetsk in a 5–1 win for Arsenal.

On 24 October 2010, Song scored his third goal of the season, the second goal at Eastlands against Manchester City in a 3–0 Arsenal victory. On 30 October 2010, he scored a vital 88th minute diving header for Arsenal from a cross by Gaël Clichy at the Emirates Stadium against West Ham United in the league, leading to an important 1–0 victory for Arsenal. On 27 December 2010, Song scored the first goal in a 3–1 victory over Chelsea at the Emirates. In February 2011, Song had his car impounded by Hertfordshire Police after he was caught speeding and failed to provide relevant documentation. During the 2010–11 season, he made 42 appearances in total, scored five goals and contributed three assists in all competitions for the Gunners.

==== 2011–12 season ====
With the departure of Cesc Fàbregas to Barcelona, Song was assigned to provide the assists for the club alongside Aaron Ramsey. During a league match at Newcastle United, Song stamped on Joey Barton, resulting in him being charged with improper conduct and given a three-match ban. On 24 September 2011, Song scored his first goal of the season in a 3–0 home victory against Bolton. He provided an assist to Robin van Persie following a dribble for the first goal in a Champions League match against Borussia Dortmund on 23 November to secure a place for Arsenal in the last 16. Wenger said in November:

I thought about that Fulham game recently, It shows that players need to be given time and confidence. Unfortunately at the big clubs you cannot always do it. He is one of the players who surprised everybody. You wouldn't expect what he delivers at the moment.

Song again assisted Van Persie – who scored a volley – during a match against Everton which also proved to be the only goal as the 125th anniversary game ended 1–0 to Arsenal. Song also showed his assisting skills in the following matches: in an FA Cup match against Leeds United, Song played a through ball past four Leeds players to the returning legend, Thierry Henry. The game ended 1–0, sending Arsenal into the fourth round of the FA Cup. He then provided two assists in back to back matches against Tottenham at home for Theo Walcott and also the winning goal for Van Persie against Liverpool at Anfield with a delightful long-ball in the dying minutes of the match. The matches ended in 5–2 and 2–1 victories respectively, highlighting the importance of Song's presence in the team not only as an anchorman in the middle but as a playmaking midfielder. Song played an overhead pass to Theo Walcott and claimed an assist against Aston Villa on 24 March 2012. Arsenal went on to win the game 3–0. His partnership with striker Van Persie was enhanced in a match on 5 May 2012 as he performed his seemingly trademark chip to assist the Dutchman in netting the equaliser against Norwich City. The game ended 3–3 and it was his 12th assist of the season. He was voted in second place as the Arsenal player of the season by the fans.

=== Barcelona ===
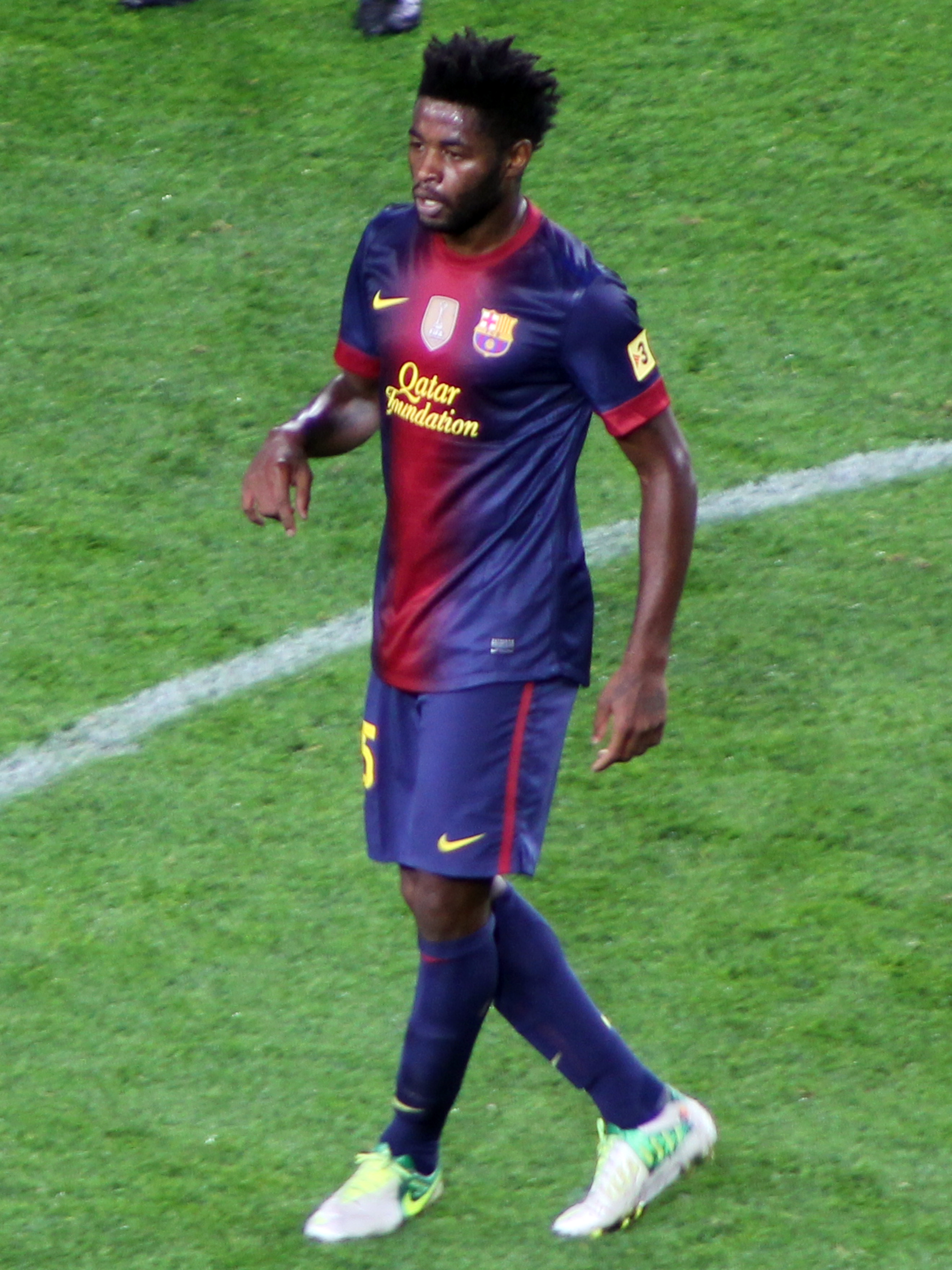
Song at Barcelona

On 20 August 2012, Song signed a five-year contract with Barcelona for a £15 million transfer fee. He made his Barcelona debut against Real Madrid in the 2012 Supercopa de España on 29 August 2012 as a substitute for the last 15 minutes, finishing the match with a perfect passing statistic. He played 20 matches in Barcelona's La Liga-winning campaign in his first season, and scored one goal, in a 3–1 home win against Real Zaragoza on 17 November 2012.

Song was an unused substitute in the 2014 Copa del Rey Final, which Barcelona lost 2–1 to Real Madrid at the Mestalla Stadium.

==== West Ham United on loan ====
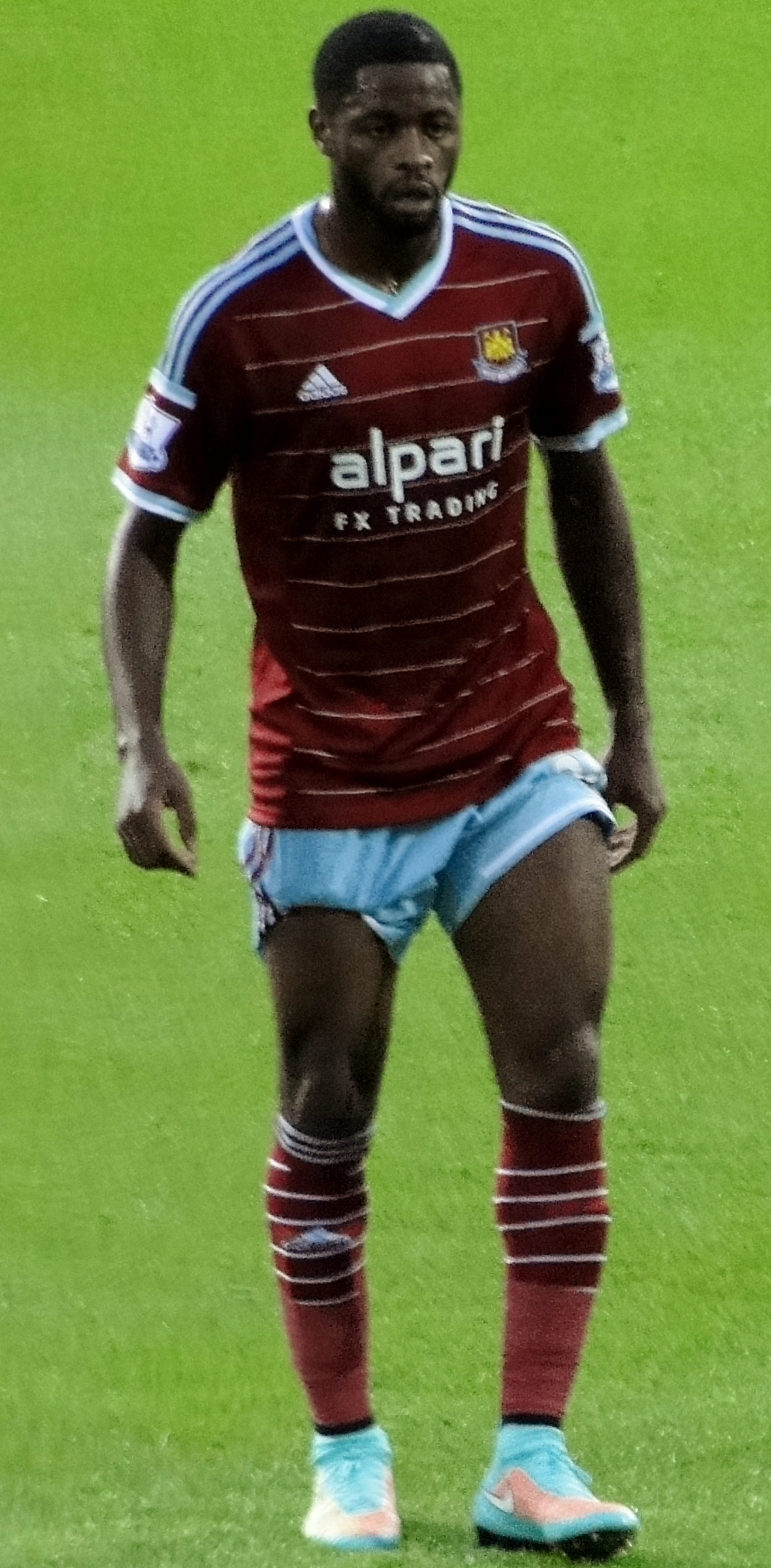
Alex Song with West Ham in 2014

On 30 August 2014, Song joined West Ham United on a season-long loan. He was unveiled to the fans on the same day before their home game against Southampton. Song made his debut against Hull City as a second-half substitute on 15 September 2014 in a 2–2 draw. He played 31 games for West Ham including three in the FA Cup. Praised for his early season form, his performances deteriorated towards the end of the season as West Ham's form also slumped. In August 2015, West Ham co-chairman David Sullivan, announced an agreement with Barcelona to sign Song on a three-year permanent contract subject to a medical. His season-long loan to West Ham was confirmed on 1 September with West Ham having the option to extend the loan for a further season.

=== Rubin Kazan ===
On 21 July 2016, Rubin Kazan reached an agreement to sign Song from Barcelona, subject to a medical. On 1 August 2016, Song officially joined the Russian side on a free transfer after his contract with Barcelona had been terminated.

In January 2018, Song trained with his old club Arsenal after being allowed to find a new club by Rubin, but was still registered with Rubin when the Russian Premier League continued on 2 March 2018 after their winter break. He was removed from their league registration list on 13 March 2018. It was reported on 2 April 2018 that Rubin sent a complaint to the FIFA Dispute Resolution Chamber, demanding 40 million euros from Song for breach of contract.

=== Sion ===
Song signed with Swiss Super League club Sion on a free transfer on 14 August 2018. In March 2020, Song was one of nine players sacked by Sion for refusing to take a pay cut during the coronavirus pandemic.

=== Arta/Solar7 ===
In November 2020, Song joined Djiboutian club Arta/Solar7 on a permanent deal. On 14 November 2023, Song announced his retirement from professional football after making 332 senior club and 49 senior international appearances.

== International career ==
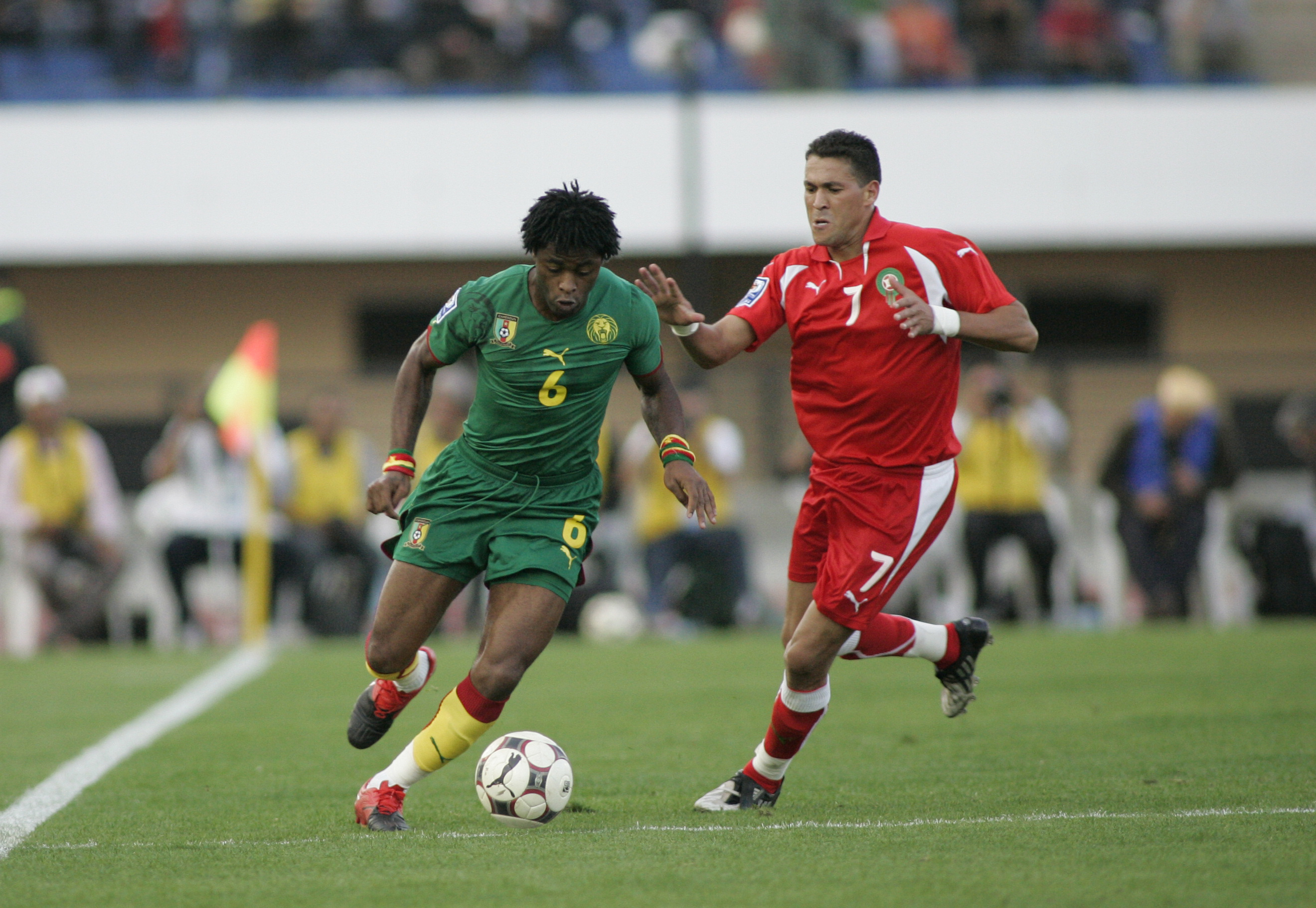
Song playing against Morocco in 2009

Song was first capped by Cameroon in 2005. He was named in the Cameroon squad for the 2008 Africa Cup of Nations. He played for Cameroon in their first group match, a 4–2 defeat against holders Egypt; he replaced Stéphane Mbia at half time, joining his uncle Rigobert on the pitch. For the duration of the tournament he was a revelation in defence for Cameroon, earning a Man of the Match award in Cameroon's semi-final, but then going off injured in the final against Egypt. He was nonetheless named in the Tournament Best XI, alongside compatriot Geremi.

Song was called up for the 2010 Africa Cup of Nations and was the only Cameroonian named in the Team of the Tournament.

Song was included in the Cameroon squad for the 2010 FIFA World Cup in South Africa. He did not appear in his side's opening loss to Japan, but played the full 90 in Cameroon's disappointing 2–1 loss to Denmark. The result ensured that Les Lions Indomptables were the first country eliminated from the World Cup. He was an unused substitute in Cameroon's final group stage match against the Netherlands, a 2–1 loss, but his uncle Rigobert made his final national team appearance in the match.

Song participated in his second FIFA World Cup at the 2014 tournament in Brazil. In the team's second group match, Song was sent off for violent conduct after striking Mario Mandžukić as Cameroon were knocked out, losing 4–0 to Croatia. Song later apologized to Mandžukić, and to the people of Cameroon for being sent off. FIFA punished Song with a three-match ban from competitive internationals, as well as fining him US$22,300. The match is being investigated for possible match-fixing after allegations in a German newspaper. In December 2014, despite being in-form for his club West Ham United, he was omitted by Cameroon coach Volker Finke from the squad for the 2015 Africa Cup of Nations.

On 6 January 2015, Song announced his international retirement, aged 27 and earning 49 caps, citing his wish to focus on rebuilding his domestic career with West Ham.

== Style of play ==
A versatile player, Song is capable of playing as a central midfielder, in a holding role, or even as a centre-back, and is primarily known for his energy, physicality, ball-winning abilities, and ability to cover ground quickly, although he is also comfortable on the ball and a strong passer. In 2012, former Barcelona goalkeeper and sports director Andoni Zubizarreta described Song as "a player who is good in the air, is physically powerful and tactically astute." Despite his defensive playing role, Song has been described by former Cameroon coach Javier Clemente as a "much better player in attack than he is defensively". Indeed, in addition to his defensive and physical qualities, he is also capable of pushing forward, carrying the ball himself, or starting attacking plays with his passing after winning back possession, thus allowing him to transition quickly between the defensive and offensive phases of the game.

== Career statistics ==
=== Club ===
Appearances and goals by club, season and competition
Club	Season	League			National cup (Note: Includes Coupe de France, FA Cup, Copa del Rey, Russian Cup, Swiss Cup)		League cup (Note: Includes Football League Cup)		Continental		Other		Total	
Club	Season	Division	Apps	Goals	Apps	Goals	Apps	Goals	Apps	Goals	Apps	Goals	Apps	Goals
Bastia	2004–05	Ligue 1	32	0	3	0			—		—		35	0
Arsenal (loan)	2005–06	Premier League	5	0	0	0	2	0	2 (Note: Appearance(s) in UEFA Champions League)	0	0	0	9	0
Arsenal	2006–07	Premier League	2	0	0	0	3	1	1	0	—		6	1
Arsenal	2007–08	Premier League	9	0	0	0	3	0	3	0	—		15	0
Arsenal	2008–09	Premier League	31	1	4	0	2	0	11	1	—		48	2
Arsenal	2009–10	Premier League	26	1	1	0	1	0	10	0	—		38	1
Arsenal	2010–11	Premier League	31	4	4	0	2	0	5	1	—		42	5
Arsenal	2011–12	Premier League	34	1	3	0	0	0	9	0	—		46	1
Arsenal	Total		138	7	12	0	13	1	41	2	0	0	204	10
Charlton Athletic (loan)	2006–07	Premier League	12	0	0	0	0	0	—		—		12	0
Barcelona	2012–13	La Liga	20	1	5	0	—		8	0	1 (Note: Appearance in Supercopa de España)	0	34	1
Barcelona	2013–14	La Liga	19	0	7	0	—		4	0	1	0	31	0
Barcelona	Total		39	1	12	0	—		12	0	2	0	65	1
West Ham United (loan)	2014–15	Premier League	28	0	3	0	0	0	–		—		31	0
West Ham United (loan)	2015–16	Premier League	12	0	3	0	0	0	–		—		15	0
West Ham United (loan)	Total		40	0	6	0	0	0	–		—		46	0
Rubin Kazan	2016–17	Russian Premier League	16	0	0	0	–		–		—		16	0
Rubin Kazan	2017–18	Russian Premier League	6	1	1	0	–		–		—		7	1
Rubin Kazan	Total		22	1	1	0	–		–		—		23	1
Sion II	2018–19	Promotion League	6	0	0	0	–		–		—		6	0
Sion	2018–19	Swiss Super League	9	0	1	0	–		–		—		10	0
Sion	2019–20	Swiss Super League	11	0	1	1	–		–		—		12	1
Sion	Total		20	0	2	1	–		–		—		22	1
Career total			308	9	36	1	13	1	53	2	2	0	413	13

=== International ===
Appearances and goals by national team and year
National team	Year	Apps	Goals
Cameroon	2005	1	0
Cameroon	2008	11	0
Cameroon	2009	3	0
Cameroon	2010	9	0
Cameroon	2011	5	0
Cameroon	2012	7	0
Cameroon	2013	6	0
Cameroon	2014	7	0
Total		49	0

== Honours ==
Arsenal

- Football League Cup runner-up: 2010–11

Barcelona

- La Liga: 2012–13
- Supercopa de España: 2013; runner-up: 2012
- Copa del Rey runner-up: 2013–14

Arta/Solar7

- Djibouti Premier League: 2020–21, 2021–22
- Djibouti Cup: 2020–21, 2021–22

Cameroon

- Africa Cup of Nations: runner-up, 2008

Cameroon U17

- African U-17 Championship: 2003

Individual

- African Player of the Year Third Place: 2012
- Africa Cup of Nations Best XI: 2008, 2010
- CAF Team of the Year: 2009, 2012
