= Djibouti Super Cup =

Association football competition

The Djibouti Super Cup (Super Coupe de Djibouti) is the football super cup competition in Djibouti, played between the winners of the Djibouti Premier League and the Djibouti Cup.

== Results ==
- date ?, 1989: AS Port 4–2 CDE
- Oct. 26, 2001: CDE 1–0 FNP
- Oct. 25, 2002: AS Borreh 2–2 Total [aet, 4–3 pen]
- Nov. 28, 2003: Gendarmerie Nationale 2–1 AS Borreh
- Nov. 10, 2005: Poste Djibouti 4–0 CDE
- May 18, 2007: SID 4–0 ASAS/Djibouti Télécom
- Nov. 2, 2007: SID 2–0 CDE/Colas
- Oct. 17, 2009: Garde Républicaine 1–1 ASAS/Djibouti Télécom [aet, 4–2 pen]
- date ?, 2010: Garde Républicaine bt ASAS/Djibouti Télécom
- Oct. 14, 2011: ASAS/Djibouti Télécom 3–0 AS Port
- Nov. 30, 2012: Garde Républicaine 2–1 AS Port
- Oct. 4, 2013: AS Port 0–0 ASAS/Djibouti Télécom [aet, 5–4 pen]
- Oct. 24, 2014: ASAS/Djibouti Télécom 3–0 AS Tadjourah
- Oct. 14, 2016: ASAS/Djibouti Télécom 6–2 FC Dikhil
- Oct. 6, 2017: Gendarmerie Nationale 7–0 ASAS/Djibouti Télécom
