= Bahache/Université de Djibouti =

Université
- Full name: Université de Djibouti
- Ground: Stade du Ville; Djibouti (city), Djibouti
- League: Djibouti Premier League

Université de Djibouti, more commonly known as Bahache/Université de Djibouti or simply Université, is a Djiboutian football club located in Djibouti City, Djibouti. It currently plays in the Djibouti Premier League.

== Stadium ==
Currently, Université de Djibouti play at the 20,000-capacity Stade du Ville.
