= Djibouti Cup =

- Organiser(s): Djiboutian Football Federation
- Founded: 1988
- Region: Djibouti
- 2024 Djibouti Cup

The Djibouti Cup is the premier professional association football tournament in Djibouti.

== Winners ==
- 1988: AS Port 0(4)–0(3) ACPM (aet)
- 1989: AS Port 4–2 Chemin de Fer Djibouto–Ethiopien
- 1990: AS Port
- 1991: AS Aéroport 2–1 AS Port
- 1992: AS Compagnie Djibouti–Ethiopie (Djib.) 4–3 AS Etablissements Merill
- 1993: Force Nationale de Sécurité (Djibouti) bt ONED
- 1994: FC Balbala 0(5)–0(4) AS Ali Sabieh (aet)
- 1995: FC Balbala
- 1996: FC Balbala
- 1996–97: Forces Armées Djiboutiennes
- 1997–98: Force Nationale de Police
- 1998–99: FC Balbala
- 1999–00: AS Port
- 2000–01: Chemin de Fer Djibouto–Ethiopien
- 2001–02: Jeunesse Espoir bt Chemin de Fer Djibouto–Ethiopien
- 2002–03: AS Borreh 1(5)–1(4) AS Ali Sabieh (aet)
- 2003–04: Chemin de Fer Djibouto–Ethiopien 6–2 AS Borreh
- 2004–05: Poste de Djibouti 2–0 AS Port
- 2005–06: AS Ali Sabieh 3–0 Gendarmerie Nationale FC
- 2006–07: FC Société Immobilière de Djibouti 1(4)–1(3) AS CDE–Colas (aet)
- 2007–08: AS CDE–Colas 1(4)–1(3) Guelleh Batal (aet)
- 2008–09: Guelleh Batal 0(13)–0(12) AS Ali Sabieh (aet)
- 2009–10: AS Port 3–2 Guelleh Batal
- 2010–11: AS Port 2–0 ASAS/Djibouti Télécom
- 2011–12: Guelleh Batal 2–1 ASAS/Djibouti Télécom
- 2012–13: AS Port 1(4)–1(3) ASAS/Djibouti Télécom (aet)
- 2013–14: AS Tadjourah 1–1 Guelleh Batal [aet, Tadjourah on pen]
- 2014–15: Guelleh Batal 2–0 AS Port
- 2015–16: ASAS/Djibouti Télécom 1(4)–1(3) FC Dikhil (aet)
- 2016–17: Gendarmerie Nationale FC 0(7)–0(6) Guelleh Batal (aet)
- 2017–18: ASAS/Djibouti Télécom 1–0 Bahache/Université de Djibouti
- 2018–19: AS Arta/Solar7 0(3)–0(0) Gendarmerie Nationale FC (aet)
- 2019–20: AS Arta/Solar7 1–0 ASAS/Djibouti Télécom
- 2020–21: AS Arta/Solar7 0(4)–0(3) FC Dikhil (aet)
- 2021–22: AS Arta/Solar7 3–1 ASAS/Djibouti Télécom
- 2022–23: AS Arta/Solar7 3–0 Guelleh Batal
- 2023–24: AS Port 1–0 AS Arta/Solar7

== See also ==
- Djibouti Premier League
- Djibouti Super Cup
