= Djiboutian Football Federation =

Governing body of association football in Djibouti

CAF
- Founded: 1979
- FIFA affiliation: 1994
- CAF affiliation: 1994
- President: Souleiman Hassan Waberi
- Website: www.fdf.dj

The Djiboutian Football Federation (Arabic: الاتحاد الجيبوتي لكرة القدم; French: Fédération Djiboutienne de Football; FDF) is the governing body of association football in Djibouti. It was founded in 1979, and affiliated to FIFA and the Confederation of African Football (CAF) in 1994, and has been a member of the Union of Arab Football Associations (UAFA) since 1998. The Federation oversees the Djibouti Premier League and the national team.

== See also ==
- Football in Djibouti
- Djibouti Premier League
- Djibouti national football team
- Djibouti Cup
- Stade du Ville
