= Djibouti Premier League =

Association football league in Djibouti

Premier League
- Founded: 1987
- Country: Djibouti
- Confederation: CAF
- Number of clubs: 10
- Level on pyramid: 1
- Relegation to: Djibouti Division 2
- Domestic cup: Djibouti Cup
- International cup(s): Champions League; Confederation Cup
- Current champions: ASAS Djibouti Télécom (8) (2024–25)
- Most championships: ASAS Djibouti Télécom (8)
- Top scorer: Gabriel Dadzie (114 goals)
- Website: fdf.dj
- Current: 2025–26 Djibouti Premier League

The Djibouti Premier League is the highest division in association football in Djibouti. It was formed in 1987. ASAS Djibouti Télécom is the most successful club in the Djibouti Premier League, having won a total of 7 championships.

== Clubs ==
=== 2022–23 season clubs ===
Team	Location	Stadium	Capacity
ACS Hayableh/CNSS	Djibouti City	El Hadj Hassan Gouled Aptidon Stadium	20,000
AS Ali Sabieh/Djibouti Télécom	Ali Sabieh	El Hadj Hassan Gouled Aptidon Stadium	20,000
AS Arta/Solar7	Arta	El Hadj Hassan Gouled Aptidon Stadium	20,000
AS Port	Djibouti City	El Hadj Hassan Gouled Aptidon Stadium	20,000
FC Dikhil/SGDT	Dikhil	El Hadj Hassan Gouled Aptidon Stadium	20,000
Force Nationale de Police	Djibouti City	El Hadj Hassan Gouled Aptidon Stadium	20,000
CF Garde Républicaine/SIAF	Djibouti City	El Hadj Hassan Gouled Aptidon Stadium	20,000
CF Gendarmerie Nationale	Djibouti City	El Hadj Hassan Gouled Aptidon Stadium	20,000
Q5/Nourie Transit	Djibouti City	El Hadj Hassan Gouled Aptidon Stadium	20,000
SDC Group	Balbala	El Hadj Hassan Gouled Aptidon Stadium	20,000

== Champions ==
=== Wins by year ===
- 1987: AS Etablissements Merill
- 1988: AS Compagnie Djibouti-Ethiopie
- 1989: not played
- 1990: not played
- 1991: Aéroport
- 1992: not played
- 1993: not played
- 1994: Force Nationale Securité
- 1995: Force Nationale Securité
- 1996: Force Nationale Securité
- 1996–97: Forces Armées Djiboutiennes
- 1997–98: AS Compagnie Djibouti-Ethiopie
- 1998–99: Force Nationale de Police
- 1999–2000: AS Boreh
- 2000–01: Force Nationale de Police
- 2001–02: AS Boreh
- 2002–03: Gendarmerie Nationale
- 2003–04: Gendarmerie Nationale
- 2004–05: AS Compagnie Djibouti-Ethiopie
- 2005–06: FC Société Immobiliére de Djibouti (S.I.D)
- 2006–07: AS Compagnie Djibouti-Ethiopie
- 2007–08: FC Société Immobiliére de Djibouti (S.I.D)
- 2008–09: ASAS Djibouti Télécom
- 2009–10: AS Port
- 2010–11: AS Port
- 2011–12: AS Port
- 2012–13: ASAS Djibouti Télécom
- 2013–14: ASAS Djibouti Télécom
- 2014–15: ASAS Djibouti Télécom
- 2015–16: ASAS Djibouti Télécom
- 2016–17: ASAS Djibouti Télécom
- 2017–18: ASAS Djibouti Télécom
- 2018–19: AS Port
- 2019–20: GR / SIAF
- 2020–21: AS Arta/Solar7
- 2021–22: AS Arta/Solar7
- 2022–23: GR / SIAF
- 2023–24: AS Arta/Solar7
- 2024-25: ASAS Djibouti Télécom

=== Wins by club ===
Club	City	Titles
Djibouti Télécom	Ali Sabieh	8
Force Nationale de Police (Includes Force Nationale Securité)	Djibouti	5
AS Compagnie Djibouti-Ethiopie	Djibouti	4
AS Port	Djibouti	4
Arta/Solar7	Arta	3
AS Boreh	Djibouti	2
Gendarmerie Nationale	Djibouti	2
FC Société Immobiliére de Djibouti	Kartileh	2
AS Aéroport	Djibouti	1
AS Etablissements Merill	Djibouti	1
Forces Armées Djiboutiennes	Djibouti	1
Guelleh Batal / Garde Républicaine	Djibouti	1

== Top goalscorers ==
Year	Country	Best scorers	Team	Goals
1988		Iftim	ACPM	12
2002–03	(Saudi Arabia)	Hussein Abdulghani	Total	34
2003–04	(Egypt)	Mohammed Salad	Total	7
2008–09	(Djibouti)	Liban Mohamed	Guelleh Batal	22
2009–10	(Djibouti)	Aden Charmakeh	AS Port	19
2011–12	(Djibouti)	Magdi Galal	AS Port	20
2013–14	(Djibouti)	Liban Mohamed	Guelleh Batal; Garde Républicaine	20
2018-19	(Djibouti)	Gabriel Dadzie	Port	18
2019–20	(Djibouti)	Gabriel Dadzie	Port	18
2020–21	(Djibouti)	Gabriel Dadzie	Arta Solar	26
2021–22	(Djibouti)	Gabriel Dadzie	Arta Solar	18
2022–23	(Djibouti)	Gabriel Dadzie	ASAS Djibouti Télécom	26
2023-24	(Djibouti)	Samuel Akinbinu	Arta Solar	14

Most time top goalscorer

- 5 times
  - Gabriel Dadzie

== Multiple hat-tricks ==
Rank	Country	Player	Hat-tricks
1	(Djibouti)	Gabriel Dadzie	2
1	(Burkina Faso)	Yacouba Songné	2
3	(Djibouti)	Samuel Akinbinu	1
3		Isha	1
3		Naman Keita	1
3		Safo Kojo	1
3	(Djibouti)	Mahdi Houssein Mahabeh	1
3	(Djibouti)	Mayor Tito	1

== See also ==
- Football in Djibouti
- Djiboutian Football Federation
- Djibouti national football team
- Djibouti Cup
- Stade du Ville
