= ACS Hayableh/CNSS =

ACS Hayableh
- Full name: Association Club Sportive de Hayableh
- Chairman: Mohamed Elmi Farah
- Coach: Hassan Abdi Mireef
- League: Djibouti Premier League
- 2023–24: Djibouti Premier League, 5th of 10
Home colours	Away colours

Association Club Sportive de Hayableh (en Arabic: جمعية نادي هايابلي), more commonly abbreviated as ACS Hayableh, is a Djiboutian football club based in the Hayableh district in Djibouti City, the capital of the country. The club currently plays in the Djibouti Premier League.
