= ASAS Djibouti Télécom =

Association football club in Djibouti

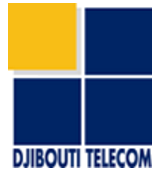
- Full name: Association Sportive d'Ali Sabieh/Djibouti Télécom
- Founded: 1991
- Ground: El Hadj Hassan Gouled Aptidon Stadium
- Capacity: 20,000
- Chairman: Oumar Ali Dheerey
- Manager: Mohamud Siad Bileyn
- League: Djibouti Premier League
- 2025–26: Djibouti Premier League, 2nd of 10

Association Sportive d'Ali Sabieh/Djibouti Télécom, or simply AS Ali Sabieh or ASAS Djibouti Télécom, is a Djiboutian football club located in Ali Sabieh, Djibouti. It currently plays in the Djibouti Premier League.

== Stadium ==
Currently the team plays at the 20,000-capacity Stade du Ville.

== Current squad ==
As of 13 September 2022

Note: Flags indicate national team as defined under FIFA eligibility rules; some limited exceptions apply. Players may hold more than one non-FIFA nationality.

No.	Pos.	Nation	Player
2	DF	DJI	Saïd Abdallah
3	DF	DJI	Ahmed Bouh
4	DF	BDI	Haruna Manirakiza
5	MF	BDI	Sudi Ntirwaza
6	DF	BDI	Gilbert Kaze
7	FW	DJI	Abdoulrazak Daher
9	FW	DJI	Kassim Kamil
10	MF	DJI	Youssouf Abdi Ahmed
11	FW	DJI	Ahmed Ali
12	MF	DJI	Radwan Daher

No.	Pos.	Nation	Player
13	FW	DJI	Gabriel Dadzie
15	DF	DJI	Abbas Abdourahman
16	GK	DJI	Innocent Mbonihankuye
18	DF	DJI	Ibrahim Mohamed
19	MF	DJI	Souhaib Oumar
20	FW	NGR	Fatai Odutola
21	MF	TOG	Kokou Djamessi
22	GK	DJI	Liban Said
25	DF	DJI	Aidid Ladieh

== Titles ==
- Djibouti Premier League: 8
  - 2008–09, 2012–13, 2013–14, 2014–15, 2015–16, 2016–17, 2017–18, 2024–25
- Djibouti Cup: 3
  - 2005–06 (as AS Ali Sabieh), 2015–16, 2017–18
