= CF Garde Républicaine/SIAF =

Djiboutian football club

Gendarmerie
- Full name: Guelleh Batal de la Garde Républicaine
- Ground: Stade du Ville; Djibouti (city), Djibouti
- Capacity: 20,000
- Chairman: Abdoulrahman Hirsiq
- Manager: Yusuf Cawil
- League: Djibouti Premier League
- 2025–26: 7th

Guelleh Batal de la Garde Républicaine, more commonly known as Garde Républicaine FC or simply Garde, is a Djiboutian football club located in Djibouti City, Djibouti. It currently plays in the Djibouti Premier League.

== Stadium ==
Currently the team plays at the 20,000 capacity Stade du Ville.

== Current squad ==
As of 22 December 2022

Note: Flags indicate national team as defined under FIFA eligibility rules; some limited exceptions apply. Players may hold more than one non-FIFA nationality.

No.	Pos.	Nation	Player
—	GK	MLI	Diakaridia Dembele
—	GK	DJI	Said Gamil
—	GK	DJI	Moktar Miganeh
—	DF	DJI	Moustapha Abdi Osman
—	DF	DJI	Farhan Daher
—	DF	DJI	Faiçal Houssein
—	DF	DJI	Omar Ilyas
—	DF	DJI	Youssouf Mohamed
—	DF	DJI	Hamze Moussa Robleh
—	DF	BEN	Eric Tossavi

No.	Pos.	Nation	Player
—	MF	DJI	Ramadan Abdi Abdillahi
—	MF	DJI	Aboubaker Elmi
—	MF	DJI	Abdourahman Hamoud Ali
—	MF	DJI	Samatar Mohamed Sougueh
—	MF	DJI	Omar Samatar
—	FW	DJI	Mahad Abdi Abdillahi
—	FW	DJI	Abdoulfatah Ambar
—	FW	DJI	Omar Cheik Yayo
—	FW	DJI	Hassan Hirir
—	FW	SOM	Omar Mohamed
