= AS Arta/Solar7 =

Association football club in Djibouti

Arta Solar 7
- Full name: Association Sportive d'Arta
- Founded: 1980; 45 years ago
- Ground: El Hadj Hassan Gouled Aptidon Stadium
- Capacity: 20,000
- Chairman: Tommy Tayoro Nyckoss
- Manager: Mohamed Meraneh Hassan
- League: Djibouti Premier League
- 2024–25: Djibouti Premier League, 3rd of 10
Home colours	Away colours	Third colours

Association Sportive d'Arta (currently known as Arta Solar 7 for sponsorship reasons) is a football club from Arta, Djibouti which plays in the Djibouti Premier League, the highest level of Djiboutian football. Their home stadium, like all Djiboutian teams, is the 20,000-capacity El Hadj Hassan Gouled Aptidon Stadium.

== History ==
The club was founded as AS Compagnie Djibouti-Ethiopie in 1980. From 2007 to 2014, they were known as AS CDE-Colas. They have since been known as AS CDE/Arta The Fairy Mountaineers when sponsored by Ethio-Djibouti Railways (French: Chemin de Fer Djibouto-Éthiopien (C.D.E.), and Arta/SIHD when sponsored by the International Hydrocarbon Society (French: Société internationale des hydrocarbures de Djibouti).

As of 2018, the club is known as Arta Solar 7, due to sponsorship with Djibouti-based Solar power company Solar 7.

In November 2020, the Djiboutian club surprised world football by signing midfielder Alex Song, formerly of Arsenal and Barcelona. In addition to playing for the core team as captain, Song oversees the development of youngsters at Solar throughout this contract period.

In the 2020/21 season, Arta Solar 7 won its first Djibouti Premier League title with 46 points out of 18 games. In the following season, 2021/22, the team won his two-time champion in the local league, this time adding 45 points.

== Performance in CAF competitions ==
- CAF Champions League: 2 appearances

2022 – First Round
2023 – First Round

- CAF Confederation Cup: 3 appearances

2019 – Preliminary Round
2020 – Preliminary Round
2021 – Preliminary Round

=== Results ===
- PR = Preliminary round
- FR = First round

Season	Competition	Round	Country	Club	Home	Away	Aggregate
2018–19	CAF Confederation Cup	PR	Kenya	Kariobangi Sharks	0–3	1–6	1–9
2019–20	CAF Confederation Cup	PR	Sudan	Al-Khartoum	1–1	0–3	1–4
2020–21	CAF Confederation Cup	PR	Egypt	Al Mokawloon Al Arab	0–1	1–9	1–10
2021–22	CAF Champions League	FR	Kenya	Tusker	1–1	0–4	1–5
2022–23	CAF Champions League	FR	Sudan	Al-Merrikh	1–2	0–0	1–2

== Performance in UAFA competitions ==
- Arab Champions League 3 appearances

2023 – Preliminary Round
2008 – Round of 32
2006 – Round of 32

== Performance in CECAFA competitions ==
- Kagame Interclub Cup 4 appearances

2019 - Group Stage
2018 - Quarter-finals
2006 - Group Stage
2001 - Group Stage

== Players ==
=== Current squad ===
As of 20 December 2023

Note: Flags indicate national team as defined under FIFA eligibility rules; some limited exceptions apply. Players may hold more than one non-FIFA nationality.

No.	Pos.	Nation	Player
1	GK	TOG	Djehani N'Guissan
2	DF	DJI	Ibrahim Ali
4	DF	DJI	Idriss Houmed Bilha
5	DF	DJI	Moussa Fahmi
6	MF	DJI	Ahmed Aden
7	FW	DJI	Mourad Abdoulkader
8	FW	CIV	Salomon Kalou
9	FW	DJI	Mahamoud Fouad
10	FW	BFA	Yacouba Songné
11	MF	DJI	Doualeh Elabeh
12	DF	DJI	Yabe Siad
13	DF	CIV	Gilles N'Guessan
14	FW	BFA	Alain Traoré

No.	Pos.	Nation	Player
15	DF	DJI	Said Abdallah
16	MF	DJI	Sadik Djama
18	FW	DJI	Samuel Akinbinu
19	MF	MLI	Moussa Coulibaly
20	MF	DJI	Warsama Hassan
21	FW	DJI	Abdoulrazack Kenedid
22	GK	DJI	Sulait Luyima
23	FW	DJI	Gabriel Dadzie
24	DF	FRA	Raphaël Diarra
28	GK	GAB	Jean-Noël Amonome
29	MF	COM	Haslane Ahmed
30	FW	DJI	Mahdi Houssein Mahabeh
—	MF	DJI	Mogueh Idriss

=== Players with multiple nationalities ===
- (Djibouti) (Nigeria) Samuel Akinbinu
- (Djibouti) (Ghana) Gabriel Dadzie
- (France) (Mali) Raphaël Diarra
- (Djibouti) (Belgium) Warsama Hassan
- (Djibouti) (Uganda) Sulait Luyima
- (Burkina Faso) (France) Alain Traoré
