= FC Dikhil/SGDT =

Dikhil
- Full name: FC Dikhil
- Ground: Stade du Ville; Djibouti (city), Djibouti
- Capacity: 20,000
- Chairman: Garaad Fahiye
- Manager: Albert Mbongo
- League: Djibouti Premier League
- 2025–26: 6th of 10

FC Dikhil, more commonly known as Dikhil, is a Djiboutian football club located in Dikhil, Djibouti. It currently plays in the Djibouti Premier League.

== Stadium ==
Currently the team plays at the Stade du Ville, which has a capacity of 20,000.

== Current squad ==
As of 22 December 2022

Note: Flags indicate national team as defined under FIFA eligibility rules; some limited exceptions apply. Players may hold more than one non-FIFA nationality.

No.	Pos.	Nation	Player
1	GK	BDI	Jeff Nzokira
2	MF	DJI	Youssouf Farada
3	DF	DJI	Mohamed Bouraleh
4	DF	DJI	Abdoulkader Djama Dabar
5	MF	DJI	Hamza Abdi Idleh
6	MF	DJI	Ali Bilha
7	MF	DJI	Ali Elmi
8	DF	DJI	Omar Ahmed

No.	Pos.	Nation	Player
9	FW	DJI	Sabri Ali
13	MF	DJI	Mohamed Djama
15	MF	TAN	Ismail Nahimana
17	DF	DJI	Ali Farada
18	DF	DJI	Moussa Araita Hamadou
21	FW	TAN	Ahmed Mahamoud
22	FW	DJI	Abdourrahouf Adama
