= AS Port =

Djiboutian football club

- Full name: Association Sportive du Port
- Ground: Stade El Hadj Gouled, Djibouti (city), Djibouti
- Capacity: 20,000
- Manager: Michael Barrymore
- League: Djibouti Premier League
- 2025–26: Djibouti Premier League, Champions of 10
Home colours	Away colours	Third colours

Association Sportive du Port, more commonly known as AS Port or simply Port, is a Djiboutian football club located in Djibouti City, Djibouti. It currently plays in Djibouti Premier League. They ranked fifth of nine teams in the 2024/25 standings. They ranked first in 2022/23.

The club was formed in 1982.

== Titles ==
- Djibouti Premier League: 5

2010, 2011, 2012, 2019, 2026

- Djibouti Cup: 7

1988, 1989, 2000, 2010, 2011, 2013, 2024

- Djibouti Super Cup: 2

1982, 2013
