= El Hadj Hassan Gouled Aptidon Stadium =

Stadium in Djibouti City

El-Hadj Hassan Gouled Aptidon Stadium
- El–Hadj
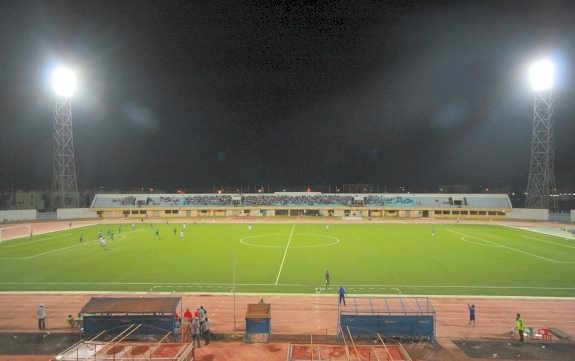
- Interactive map of El-Hadj Hassan Gouled Aptidon Stadium
- Location: Djibouti City, Djibouti
- Coordinates: 11°34′27″N 43°07′55″E
- Capacity: 20,000
- Surface: AstroTurf

Construction
- Opened: 26 June 1993
- Renovated: 2002, 2026

Tenant
- Djibouti national football team (1993–present)

The El Hadj Hassan Gouled Aptidon Stadium is a multi-use stadium in Djibouti City, Djibouti. It is currently reserved mostly for football matches. The stadium has a capacity of hosting up to 20,000 fans. As of April 2007, the Stade has an artificial turf pitch courtesy of FIFA's Win in Africa development programme. It is currently the home ground of the Djibouti national football team. The stadium is home to many sports federations in Djibouti, including the Djiboutian Football Federation.

== History ==
The stadium opened on June 26, 1993. It is named after the first President of Djibouti, Hassan Gouled Aptidon. The facility was built with the assistance of Chinese engineers. The stadium has also benefited from the Goal program established by FIFA.

Renovation work at the stadium commenced in 2002.

In 2007, new artificial turf was installed for a second time.

15 November 2017 - Djibouti have been banned from taking part in the qualifying for the 2020 African Nations Championship (CHAN). That led to Caf imposing a further sanction of US$10,000 on the Djibouti Football Federation which they must pay as compensation to their Ethiopian counterparts.

== Infrastructures ==
The stadium includes an eight-lane running track and artificial turf. It has two stands, one covered, which can accommodate 10,000 spectators. The complex also has three rooms for the practice of martial arts and table tennis.

As reported on 7 March 2026. The Confederation of African Football (CAF) has denied Category 3 accreditation to El Hadj Hassan Gouled Aptidon Stadium, the Djiboutian Football Federation (FDF) confirmed. Djibouti were hopeful to stage a continental qualifying game after a five-year hiatus at home, but that dream is shattered for now.

13 Sep 2024 (Ghana Web) Ghanaian sports journalist Saddick Adams has revealed that several African countries including Djibouti have been banned by the Confederation of African Football (CAF) from hosting football matches at their home stadiums due to poor facilities.

== Competitions ==
The stadium has previously hosted matches for the Djibouti national football team, the Djibouti championship, Djibouti Cup, and Djibouti Super Cup as well as athletics competitions.

On April 7, 2000, the first official international match was played in the stadium featuring Djibouti and the Democratic Republic of Congo during 2002 FIFA World Cup qualification, a 1–1 draw in front of 2,700 spectators.

In athletics, it is the place of departure and arrival of the international semi-marathon of Djibouti which takes place annually in March.
