= 2026 in Djibouti =

- Decades: 2000s; 2010s; 2020s
- See also: Other events of 2026; Timeline of Djiboutian history

Events in the year 2026 in Djibouti.

== Incumbents ==
- President: Ismaïl Omar Guelleh
- Prime Minister: Abdoulkader Kamil Mohamed

== Events ==
- 24 March – At least nine people die, and 45 go missing, after a migrant boat carrying 320 people is wrecked off the northern coast near Obock.
- 10 April – 2026 Djiboutian presidential election: Incumbent Ismaïl Omar Guelleh is reelected to a sixth term as president with 97.81% of the vote.
- 9 May – Ismaïl Omar Guelleh is inaugurated for his sixth term as president.
- 17 May – President Guelleh unveils his new cabinet.
- 16 September – Interior Minister Omar Abdi Said announces that over 2,500 Yemeni refugees fleeing from the Yemeni civil war arrived in the country.
- 8–9 October – A boat carrying migrants capsizes off the Djiboutian coast, killing 139 passengers.

== Holidays ==
- 1 January – New Year's Day
- 16 January – Isra' and Mi'raj
- 20–21 March – Eid al-Fitr
- 1 May – Labour Day
- 26–27 May – Eid al-Adha
- 16 June – Muharram
- 27–28 June – Independence Day
- 25 August – Milad un-Nabi
- 25 December – Christmas Day
