= 2019 in Djibouti =

- Decades: 1990s; 2000s; 2010s; 2020s
- See also: Other events of 2019; Timeline of Djiboutian history

Events in the year 2019 in Djibouti.

== Incumbents ==
- President: Ismaïl Omar Guelleh
- Prime Minister: Abdoulkader Kamil Mohamed

== Events ==
- The Abdülhamid II Mosque, the largest mosque in the country is completed.

== Sports ==
- 2018–19 Djibouti Premier League
- 2019–20 Djibouti Premier League
