= 2020 in Djibouti =

- Decades: 2000s; 2010s; 2020s
- See also: Other events of 2020; Timeline of Djiboutian history

Events in the year 2020 in Djibouti.

== Incumbents ==
- President: Ismaïl Omar Guelleh
- Prime Minister: Abdoulkader Kamil Mohamed

== Events ==
Ongoing — COVID-19 pandemic in Djibouti; 2020 East Africa floods

- 18 March – The first confirmed COVID-19 case is detected when a member of the Spanish Special Forces who arrived on 14 March for Operation Atalanta tested positive.
- 9 April – Djibouti recorded its first coronavirus death.
- 4 October – Eight migrants are dead, while 12 more are missing, after three unidentified smugglers hijacked their boat off the coast of Djibouti, according to eyewitnesses and the International Organization for Migration. The agency reports that the migrants had attempted to reach Saudi Arabia via Yemen, but were forced to return to the Horn of Africa due to COVID-19 pandemic-related travel restrictions.

== Sports ==
- 27 December 2019 – 5 September 2020: 2019–20 Djibouti Premier League
- 11 December 2020 – 24 April 2021: 2020–21 Djibouti Premier League

== Deaths ==
- 23 June – Xabiiba Cabdilaahi, 58, singer
