= 2021 in Djibouti =

- Decades: 2000s; 2010s; 2020s
- See also: Other events of 2021; Timeline of Djiboutian history

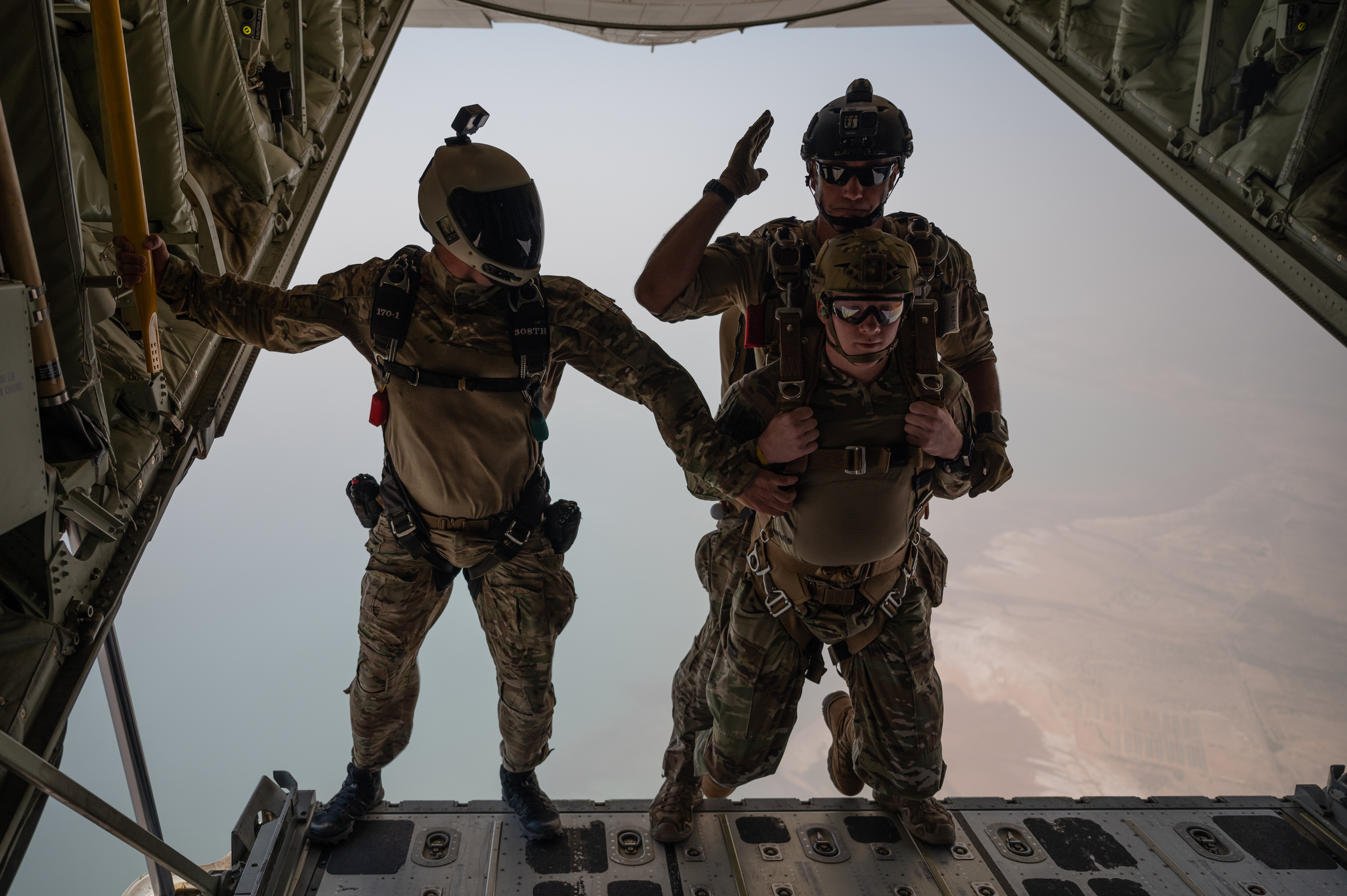
US Air Force in Djibouti, 2021

Events in the year 2021 in Djibouti.

== Incumbents ==
- President: Ismaïl Omar Guelleh
- Prime Minister: Abdoulkader Kamil Mohamed

== Events ==
Ongoing — COVID-19 pandemic in Djibouti

- 4 March – Twenty migrants drown after 80 people are thrown overboard on a boat en route from Djibouti to Yemen.
- 9 April – 2021 Djiboutian presidential election.
