= 2022 in Djibouti =

- Decades: 2000s; 2010s; 2020s
- See also: Other events of 2022; Timeline of Djiboutian history

Events in the year 2022 in Djibouti.

== Incumbents ==
- President: Ismaïl Omar Guelleh
- Prime Minister: Abdoulkader Kamil Mohamed

== Events ==
Ongoing — COVID-19 pandemic in Djibouti

- 30 August – The first ship carrying grain from Ukraine arrives in Djibouti.

== Sports ==
- 18 June – 3 July: Djibouti at the 2022 World Aquatics Championships
- 15 July – 24 July: Djibouti at the 2022 World Athletics Championships
- 2021–22 Djibouti Premier League
