= 2023 in Djibouti =

- Decades: 2000s; 2010s; 2020s
- See also: Other events of 2023; Timeline of Djiboutian history

Events in the year 2023 in Djibouti.

== Incumbents ==
- President: Ismaïl Omar Guelleh
- Prime Minister: Abdoulkader Kamil Mohamed

== Events ==
Ongoing — COVID-19 pandemic in Djibouti

- February – 2023 Djiboutian parliamentary election

== Sports ==
- 2022–23 Djibouti Premier League
