= 2025 in Djibouti =

- Decades: 2000s; 2010s; 2020s
- See also: Other events of 2025; Timeline of Djiboutian history

Events in the year 2025 in Djibouti.

== Incumbents ==
- President: Ismaïl Omar Guelleh
- Prime Minister: Abdoulkader Kamil Mohamed

== Events ==
- February 15 – Foreign minister Mahamoud Ali Youssouf is elected as Chairperson of the African Union Commission.
- March 7 – Two die while 186 others are reported missing after four boats sink off the coast of Djibouti.
- March 14 – The World Bank approves a US$31 million project aimed at strengthening the socio-economic foundations of underserved regions in Djibouti.
- April 1 – Abdoulkader Houssein Omar, former ambassador to Kuwait and Jordan is appointed as the new foreign minister.
- June 5 – Eight migrants are reported dead while 22 others are reported missing after being offloaded by traffickers from a boat off the Djiboutian coast.
- September 27 – The Seven Brothers Islands are designated as biosphere reserves by UNESCO.

== Holidays ==
- 1 January – New Year's Day
- 27 January – Isra' and Mi'raj
- 30–31 March – Eid al-Fitr
- 1 May – Labour Day
- 6–7 June – Eid al-Adha
- 26 June – Muharram
- 27–28 June – Independence Day
- 4 September – Milad un-Nabi
- 25 December – Christmas Day
