= 2015 in Djibouti =

- Decades: 1990s; 2000s; 2010s; 2020s
- See also: Other events of 2015; Timeline of Djiboutian history

The following lists events that happened during 2015 in Djibouti.

== Incumbents ==
- President: Ismaïl Omar Guelleh
- Prime Minister: Abdoulkader Kamil Mohamed

== Events ==
=== January 23, 2015 ===
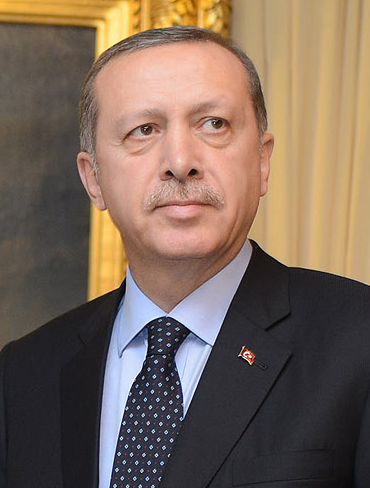
Turkish President Erdoğan visited Djibouti in January of 2015

- Turkish President Recep Tayyip Erdoğan visited Djibouti as part of his African visit.
