= Abdülhamid II Mosque =

Mosque in Djibouty City, Djibouti

- مسجد عبد الحميد الثاني (Arabic); Mosquée Abdulhamid II (French)
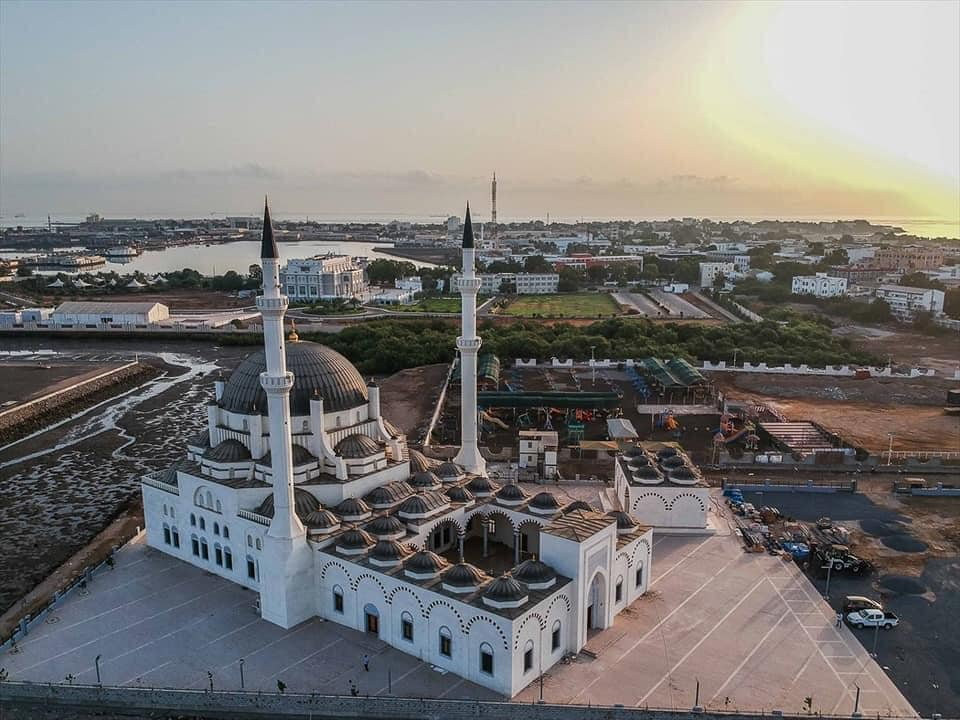

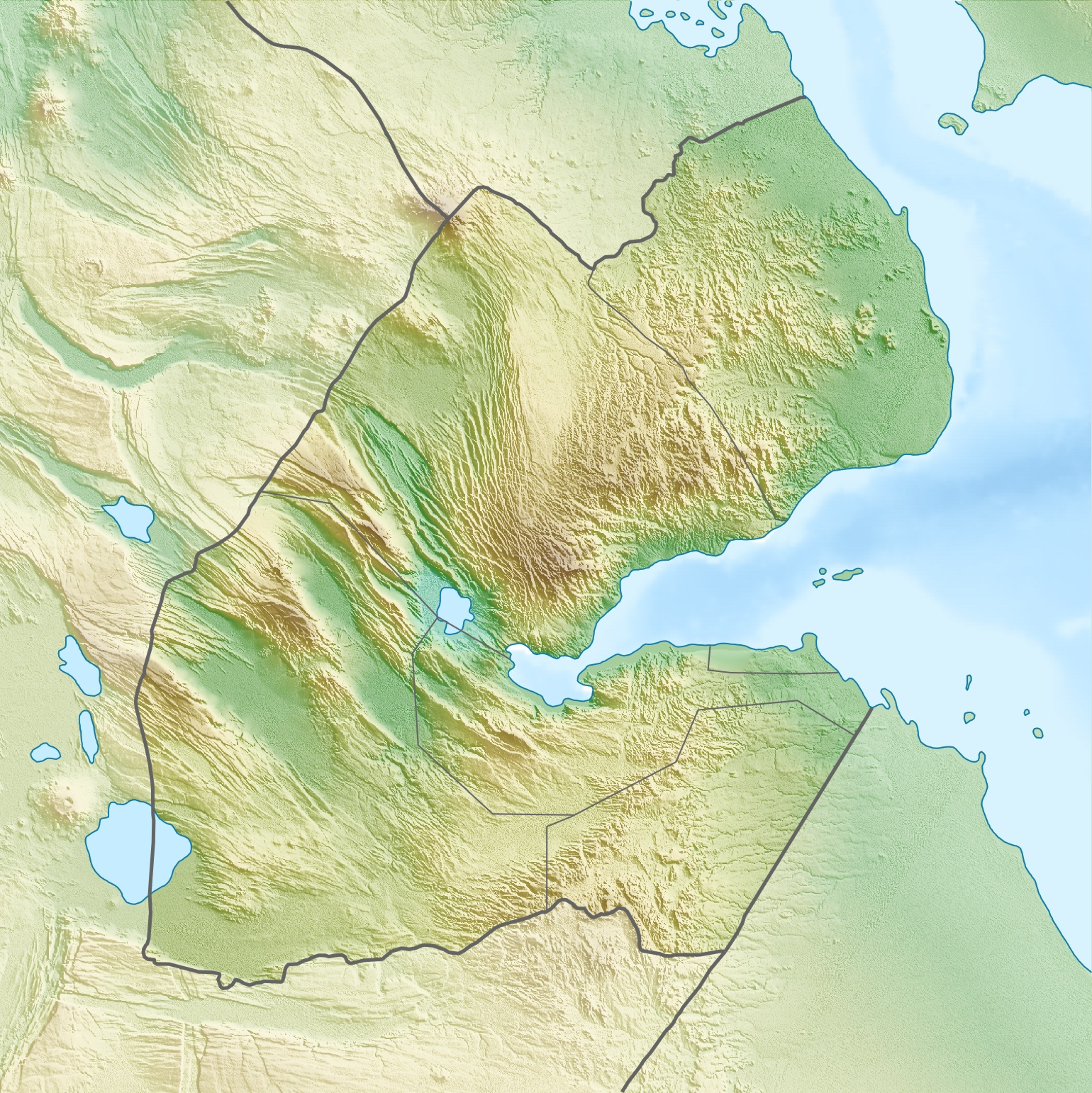
- Location within Djibouti

Religion
- Affiliation: Islam
- Ecclesiastical or organisational status: Mosque
- Status: Active

Location
- Location: Djibouti City
- Country: Djibouti
- Interactive map of Abdülhamid II Mosque
- Coordinates: 11°35′36″N 43°8′31″E

Architecture
- Type: Mosque
- Style: Ottoman
- Funded by: Turkish Diyanet Foundation
- Completed: 2019

Specifications
- Capacity: 6,000 worshipers
- Dome: 1
- Dome height (outer): 27 m (89 ft)
- Minaret: 2
- Minaret height: 46 m (151 ft)

The Abdülhamid II Mosque (Arabic: مسجد عبد الحميد الثاني; French: Mosquée Abdulhamid II) is a mosque in Djibouti City, Djibouti. It is the largest mosque in Djibouti.

== History ==
The idea for the mosque was discussed in 2015, in a meeting of President of Djibouti, Ismail Omar Guelleh and Turkish President Erdoğan. Completed in 2019, it was funded by the Turkish Diyanet foundation. It was named after the Ottoman sultan Abdulhamid II. The building, constructed in the Ottoman style, has a capacity of 6,000.

== Architecture ==
The mosque was constructed on reclaimed land. The mosque was inaugurated in 2019. The inauguration was attended by Prime Minister Abdoulkader Kamil Mohamed. The mosque is built in an Ottoman revival style. It has two 46-metre-tall (151 ft) minarets and a central dome with a height of 27 metres (89 ft).
