= 2005 in Djibouti =

- Decades: 1980s; 1990s; 2000s; 2010s; 2020s
- See also: Other events of 2005; Timeline of Djiboutian history

The following lists events that happened in 2005 in Djibouti.

== Incumbents ==
- President: Ismaïl Omar Guelleh
- Prime Minister: Dileita Mohamed Dileita

== Events ==
=== March ===
- March 10 - Mohamed Daoud Chehem, the only opposition candidate in the forthcoming presidential elections, withdraws from the race. The incumbent President Ismail Omar Guelleh remains the only candidate in the elections of April 8.

=== April ===
- April 8 - Presidential elections begin in Djibouti. Incumbent president Ismail Omar Guelleh is the only candidate.
