= 2024 in Djibouti =

- Decades: 2000s; 2010s; 2020s
- See also: Other events of 2024; Timeline of Djiboutian history

Events in the year 2024 in Djibouti.

== Incumbents ==
- President: Ismaïl Omar Guelleh
- Prime Minister: Abdoulkader Kamil Mohamed

== Events ==
- 9 April – A boat carrying migrants sinks off the country's coast, killing 38 people and leaving six others missing. Twenty-two people are rescued.
- 23 April – 21 migrants die after their boat capsizes off the coast of Djibouti.
- 1 October – Two boats carrying migrants sink off the coast of Khôr ʽAngar, killing at least 45 people and leaving 61 others missing.

== Holidays ==
- 1 January – New Year's Day
- 7 February – Isra' and Mi'raj
- 10–11 April – Eid al-Fitr
- 1 May – Labour Day
- 16 June – Eid al-Adha
- 27 June – Independence Day
- 7 July – Muharram
- 15 September – Milad un-Nabi
- 25 December – Christmas Day
