= 2018 in Djibouti =

- Decades: 1990s; 2000s; 2010s; 2020s
- See also: Other events of 2018; Timeline of Djiboutian history

Events in the year 2018 in Djibouti.

== Incumbents ==
- President: Ismaïl Omar Guelleh
- Prime Minister: Abdoulkader Kamil Mohamed

== Events ==
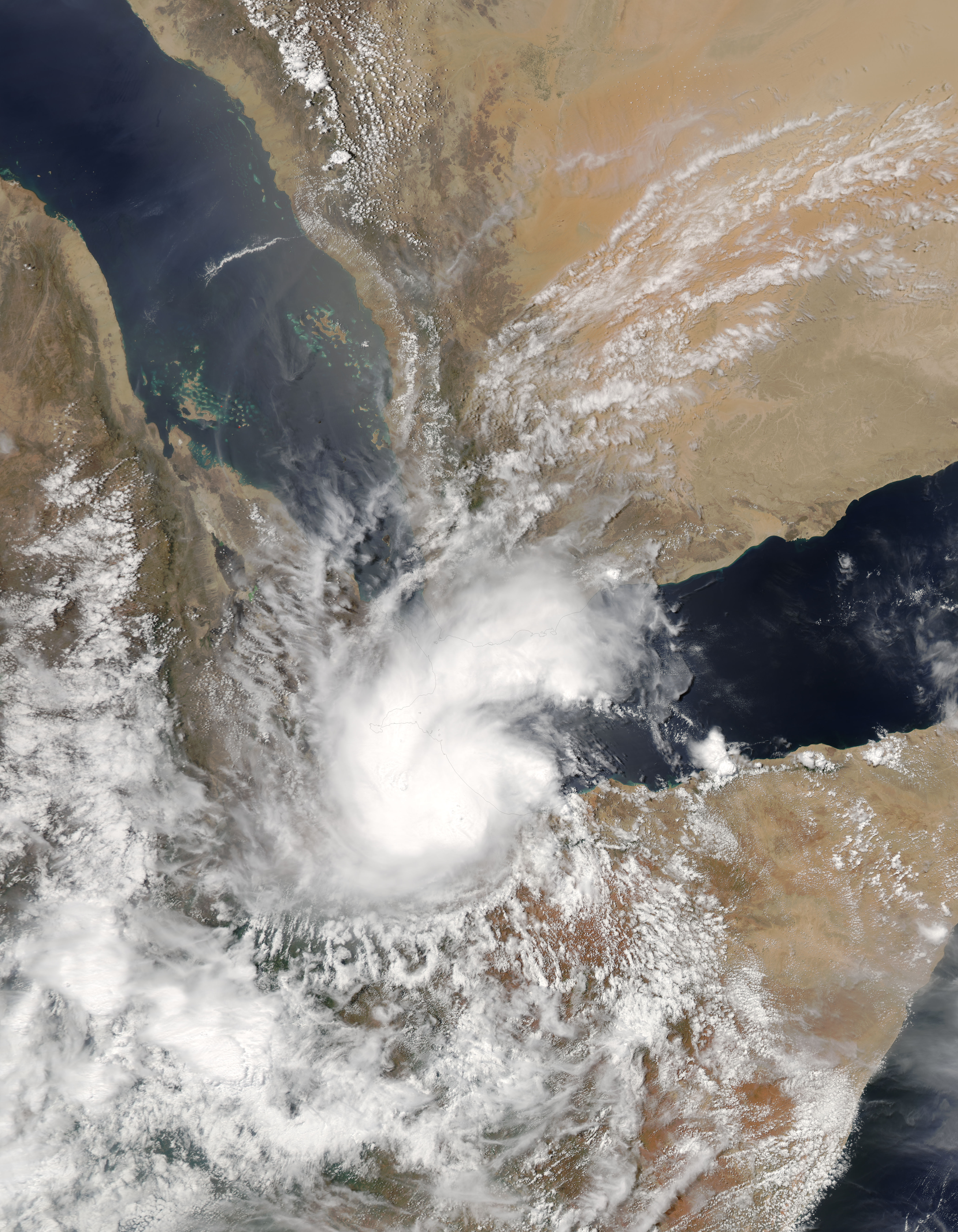
Cyclone Sagar after landfall on 19 May

23 February – Djiboutian parliamentary election, 2018

19 May - Cyclone Sagar makes landfall, kills 2 in Djibouti and affects 20,000 others

== Deaths ==
- 18 March – Barkat Gourad Hamadou, former Prime Minister (b. 1930).
