= Mohamed Warsama Ragueh =

Djiboutian lawyer and judge

Presidential candidate 2011 Djibouti

President of Djibouti's Constitutional Council
- In office 2005–2009/2010

Personal details
- Occupation: Politician Lawyer Judge

Mohamed Warsama Ragueh (Somali: Maxamed Warsame Raage) is a Djiboutian lawyer and former judge. He was the president of the Constitutional Council and a candidate in the 2011 presidential election. He could only secure 19% of the vote, losing to Ismail Omar Guelleh who won 80% of the votes. Djibouti's opposition coalitions boycotted the election, saying it would not be free and fair, leaving only President Guelleh and Ragueh, who had served as President of Djibouti's Constitutional Council in 2005. Ragueh complained about irregularities in the voting.
