= 2008 in Djibouti =

- Decades: 1980s; 1990s; 2000s; 2010s; 2020s
- See also: Other events of 2008; Timeline of Djiboutian history

The following lists events that happened in 2008 in Djibouti.

== Incumbents ==
- President: Ismaïl Omar Guelleh
- Prime Minister: Dileita Mohamed Dileita

== Events ==
=== June ===
- June 2 - The United Nations Security Council goes on a mission to Africa with the first leg of the mission to Djibouti to discuss the Somali Civil War.
- June 14 - The French Defense Ministry announces France is increasing its military presence in Djibouti following border clashes with Eritrea. France has a mutual defense agreement with Djibouti.

=== October ===
- October 24 - The government of Djibouti has said that the country will have to go to war with Eritrea unless the United Nations acts to resolve growing tension over a border dispute.
