= 2011 in Djibouti =

- Decades: 1990s; 2000s; 2010s; 2020s
- See also: Other events of 2011; Timeline of Djiboutian history

The following lists events that happened during 2011 in Djibouti.

== Incumbents ==
- President: Ismaïl Omar Guelleh
- Prime Minister: Dileita Mohamed Dileita

== Events ==
=== February ===
- February 18 - Police shoot tear gas at thousands of people demonstrating against the Ismail Omar Guelleh regime in Djibouti.

=== May ===
- May 12 - The International Criminal Court asks the United Nations Security Council to take action over Djibouti's failure to arrest Sudanese President Omar al-Bashir, who was indicted by the court on charges of war crimes.
