= 2026 Djiboutian presidential election =

- 10 April 2026
- Turnout: 88.56% (▲12.12pp)
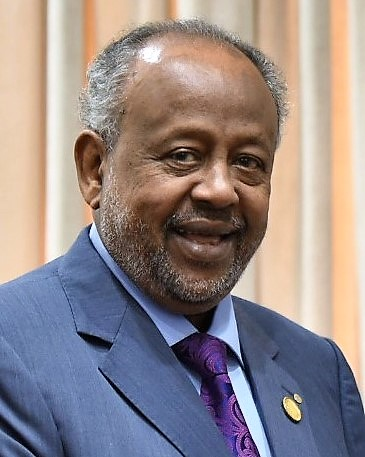

Candidate	Ismaïl Omar Guelleh	Mohamed Farah Samatar
Party	RPP	CDU
Alliance	UMP
Popular vote	204,874	6,318
Percentage	97.01%	2.99%
President before election
Ismaïl Omar Guelleh
RPP
Elected President
Ismaïl Omar Guelleh
RPP

Presidential elections were held in Djibouti on 10 April 2026. Incumbent fifth term president Ismaïl Omar Guelleh was re-elected to a sixth term, having been president since 1999. Originally ineligible for a sixth term due to an age limit of 75, a constitutional amendment was passed in 2025 that allowed him to run again. Most of the opposition parties either boycotted the election or decided to support Guelleh.

== Background ==
Ismaïl Omar Guelleh, president of Djibouti since 1999, was re-elected five times, most recently in April 2021. While scrapping term limits in the 2010 constitutional reform, Guelleh also imposed an age limit of 75, meaning he was originally term-limited in 2026. Despite this, he had expressed interest in running again.

Alexis Mohamed, a senior advisor to Guelleh, resigned on 22 September 2025, citing democratic backsliding and nepotism. Mohamed criticised any amendment that would change term limits, stating that he could not endorse any constitutional change that would allow Guelleh to run again.

On 26 October 2025, all 65 members of the National Assembly unanimously passed a bill lifting age limits for the presidency, enabling Guelleh to run for a sixth term. National Assembly president Dileita Mohamed Dileita defended the amendment, stating that the change was essential to maintaining stability. The amendment, which was later ratified by the parliament on 2 November 2025, was criticised by the president of the Djiboutian League for Human Rights (LDDH), Omar Ali Ewado, stating that the change prepared Djibouti for a presidency for life under Guelleh. On 8 November 2025, Guelleh officially announced that he would be a candidate.

Similar to the 2021 election, major opposition coalitions such as the Bloc for National Salvation (BSN) — a coalition created in May 2024 bringing together the Republican Alliance for Democracy (ARD) and the Movement for Democratic Renewal and Development (MRDD) — did not field a candidate against Guelleh. The Union for Democracy and Justice, led by Ilaya Ismail Guedi Hared, also chose to support Guelleh while passing the constitutional amendment that lifted the age limit.

== Electoral system ==
The president is elected through a two-round system for a five year term. A candidate who gets the majority of votes in the first round is duly elected; if this is not achieved, a second round is organised between the two candidates who received the most votes in the first. Whoever receives the most votes in the second round is then elected.

To be eligible for the presidency, a candidate must be exclusively of Djiboutian nationality, currently have civil and political rights, be at least forty years of age and have resided continuously in the country for five years — except in the case of a mission carried out on behalf of the State or an international organization — at the time of submission of the candidacy. Each candidate is also required to pay a financial deposit of five million Djiboutian francs to the fund of the National Paymaster.

== Candidates ==
On 1 March 2026, the Ministry of the Interior announced that the filing of candidacies would be officially opened on 2 March, giving the chance for any potential candidate to file by 11 March. On 9 March, incumbent President Ismail Omar Guelleh submitted his candidacy for a sixth term as the candidate of the Union for the Presidential Majority (UMP) coalition, which includes the presidential party, the People's Rally for Progress (RPR). On 10 March, the candidate for Unified Democratic Centre (CDU), Mohamed Farah Samatar, also submitted his candidacy. Samatar, a former member of the RPP, was seen as a largely unknown candidate. Former presidential advisor Alexis Mohamed stated that he was unable to pursue his candidacy because he had no security guarantees if he decided to return to Djibouti from abroad. The Constitutional Council confirmed the two candidates on 12 March.

With the Ministry of the Interior ratifying the two candidacies on 18 March, the only two candidates on the ballot were Guelleh and Mohamed Farah Samatar of the CDU.

== Campaign ==
After the campaign period officially began on 27 March 2026, CDU candidate Mohamed Farah Samatar launched his campaign at Tadjoura at a rally, presenting an alternative vision for the country under the slogan "Another Djibouti is possible". After stressing the need for political renewal and citizen involvement, Samatar held a second rally in Obock. Samatar further campaigned on cracking down on corruption, cutting wasteful government expenditures, and boosting social spending.

Incumbent president Ismail Omar Guelleh also began campaigning on 27 March at an initial rally in Dikhil, followed by Ali Sabieh on 28 March. After one day of rest, Guelleh resumed his national tour at Boul'aos, followed by a set of three rallies at Arta, Obock, and Tadjoura, before closing at the El Hadj Hassan Gouled Aptidon Stadium. The campaign for Guelleh reportedly peaked on 6 April, with a pro-Guelleh rally in Balbala. At the closing rally at Gouled Stadium on 9 April, Guelleh outlined his key priorities including accelerating economic growth, expanding job opportunities, improving public services and infrastructure, while also maintaining national stability.

=== Conduct ===
Figures from the Ministry of the Interior revealed that 256,467 people, including 162,833 in Djibouti City, were eligible to vote across 712 polling stations nationwide. On 7 April, the Ministry of Foreign Affairs announced that 67 international observers would be deployed during the election from the African Union, the Intergovernmental Authority on Development, the Arab League and the Organisation of Islamic Cooperation. Voting took place from 06:00 am to 06:00 pm EAT (UTC+03:00), with some polling stations opening late and morning turnout being low. Some polling stations in the capital Djibouti closed around 7:00 pm EAT (1600 GMT), an hour after the official end of voting. Voter numbers picked up in the late afternoon at polling stations in the capital, but no queues formed; AFP observers reported that turnout at visited polling stations ranged between 36 to 58 percent, but it exceeded 90 percent at one where soldiers were voting.

== Results ==
When 6% of all votes were counted, an AFP tally of early partial results covering 38 polling stations in Djibouti City indicated that incumbent president Ismaïl Omar Guelleh was leading with 96.47% of the vote, while CDU candidate Mohamed Farah Samatar followed second with 3.52% of the vote.

Later preliminary figures published by the Ministry of the Interior revealed that Guelleh won re-election to a sixth term in office, winning 97.81% of the vote, while Samatar took 2.19% of the vote. Turnout in the election was reportedly 80.33%. The results were confirmed by the Constitutional Council on 21 April, which showed that Guelleh was reelected with 97.01% of the vote, followed by Samatar with 2.99%.

Candidate	Party	Votes	%
Ismaïl Omar Guelleh	People's Rally for Progress	204,874	97.01
Mohamed Farah Samatar	Unified Democratic Centre	6,318	2.99
Total		211,192	100.00
Valid votes		211,192	98.05
Invalid/blank votes		4,201	1.95
Total votes		215,393	100.00
Registered voters/turnout		243,208	88.56
Source: Journal Officiel

== Reactions ==
During the release of early results, President Guelleh declared himself re-elected in a social media post ahead of the official results. Election officials noted that the vote was peaceful, while supporters of Guelleh celebrated and offered congratulations. IGAD executive secretary Workneh Gebeyehu reiterated IGAD's continued commitment to working with Djibouti in advancing regional cooperation, peace, stability, and shared prosperity. African Union commission chairperson Mahamoud Ali Youssouf also congratulated President Guelleh, giving his best wishes for a successful term in office.
