= Yacin Yabeh Galeb =

Yacin Yabeh Galeb was the chief of staff of Force Nationale de Police of Djibouti from 1977 to December 7, 2000 when he was demoted to adviser to interior minister. Shortly afterwards police loyal to him attempted a coup d'état. The coup attempt was stopped by the army; he fled to a French military base but was turned over to Djibouti authorities on December 9. On December 13 he was charged in court with conspiracy and breaching state security. He was said to be an old friend of President Ismail Omar Guelleh, but relations between the two had reportedly been worsening prior to the events.

Yacin Yabeh Galeb was reportedly released for medical treatment in June 2001, but he was sentenced to 15 years in prison in June 2002.
