= COVID-19 vaccination in Djibouti =

Plan to immunize against COVID-19

- Date: March 15, 2021 - present
- Location: Djibouti
- Cause: COVID-19 pandemic

COVID-19 vaccination in Djibouti is an ongoing immunisation campaign against severe acute respiratory syndrome coronavirus 2 (SARS-CoV-2), the virus that causes coronavirus disease 2019 (COVID-19), in response to the ongoing pandemic in the country.

Djibouti began its vaccination program on 15 March 2021, initially with 24,000 doses of AstraZeneca's Covishield vaccine provided through COVAX.

== History ==
=== Timeline ===
==== March 2021 ====
By the end of the month 455 vaccine doses had been administered.

==== April 2021 ====
By the end of the month 11,343 vaccine doses had been administered.

==== May 2021 ====
By the end of the month 14,943 vaccine doses had been administered.

==== June 2021 ====
By the end of the month 35,606 vaccine doses had been administered.

==== August 2021 ====
By the end of the month 54,229 vaccine doses had been administered.

==== September 2021 ====
By the end of the month 67,229 vaccine doses had been administered.

==== October 2021 ====
By the end of the month 92,097 vaccine doses had been administered while 7% of the targeted population had been fully vaccinated.

==== November 2021 ====
By the end of the month 99,679 vaccine doses had been administered while 7% of the targeted population had been fully vaccinated.

==== December 2021 ====
By the end of the month 200,309 vaccine doses had been administered while 23% of the targeted population had been fully vaccinated.

==== January 2022 ====
By the end of the month 213,820 vaccine doses had been administered while 25% of the targeted population had been fully vaccinated.

==== February 2022 ====
By the end of the month 240,576 vaccine doses had been administered while 100,289 persons had been fully vaccinated.

==== March 2022 ====
By the end of the month 259,551 vaccine doses had been administered while 109,762 persons had been fully vaccinated.

==== April 2022 ====
By the end of the month 278,643 vaccine doses had been administered while 119,296 persons had been fully vaccinated.

== Progress ==
Cumulative vaccinations in Djibouti
