= 2011 Djiboutian presidential election =

- 8 April 2011
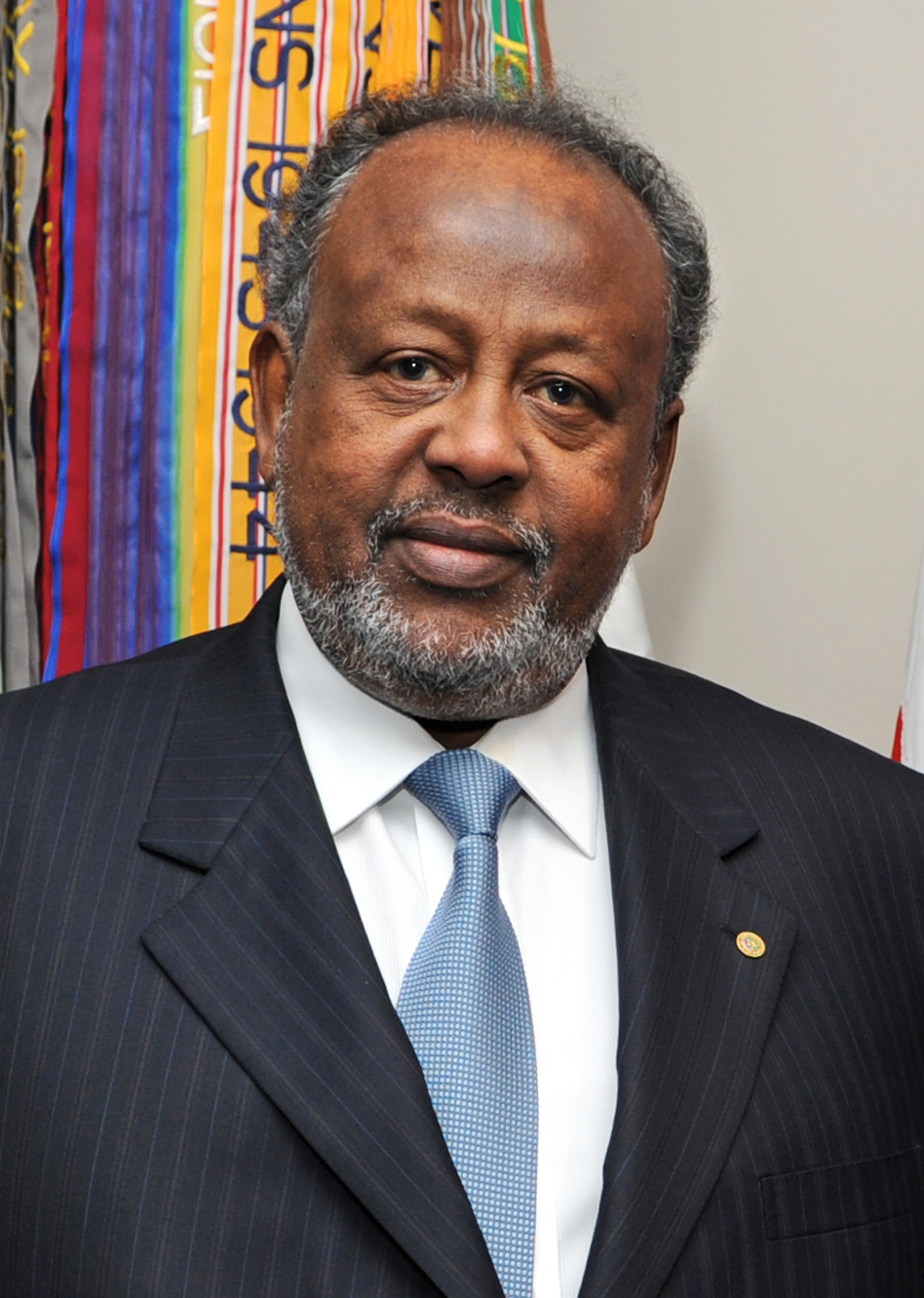

Nominee	Ismaïl Omar Guelleh	Mohamed Warsama Ragueh
Party	RPP	Independent
Alliance	UMP
Popular vote	89,951	21,602
Percentage	80.64%	19.36%
President before election
Ismaïl Omar Guelleh
RPP
Elected President
Ismaïl Omar Guelleh
RPP

Presidential elections were held in Djibouti on 8 April 2011. Incumbent president Ismail Omar Guelleh was re-elected with 81% of the vote, defeating Mohamed Warsama Ragueh, an attorney and former judge who received 19% of the vote.

Djibouti's opposition coalitions boycotted the elections, saying they would not be free and fair, leaving only President Guelleh and Ragueh, who had served as President of Djibouti's Constitutional Council in 2005. Ragueh complained about irregularities in the voting.

== Background ==
In April 2010, the National Assembly of Djibouti amended the Constitution to allow Guelleh to stand for a third term. Presidents had been limited to two terms. Coinciding with the wider Arab Spring, protesters began calling for President Guelleh's ousting in February 2011. On at least two occasions the government detained opposition leaders and imprisoned many protesters.

Another potential candidate, businessman Abdourahman Boreh, who was living in self-imposed exile in London, did not participate because Guelleh was on the ballot.

== Conduct ==
Democracy International (DI), an organization funded by USAID, had been in the country since November planning to monitor the elections, but was told to leave by the government on 21 March 2011 after officials questioned its impartiality. The African Union and the U.S. and French embassies sent some observers to monitor the elections, as did other regional groups.

== Results ==
Candidate	Party	Votes	%
Ismaïl Omar Guelleh	People's Rally for Progress	89,951	80.64
Mohamed Warsama Ragueh	Independent	21,602	19.36
Total		111,553	100.00
Valid votes		111,553	97.27
Invalid/blank votes		3,128	2.73
Total votes		114,681	100.00
Source: Journal Officiel

== Aftermath ==
Guelleh was sworn in for his third term on 8 May 2011.
