= Handoga =

Archaeological site in Djibouti

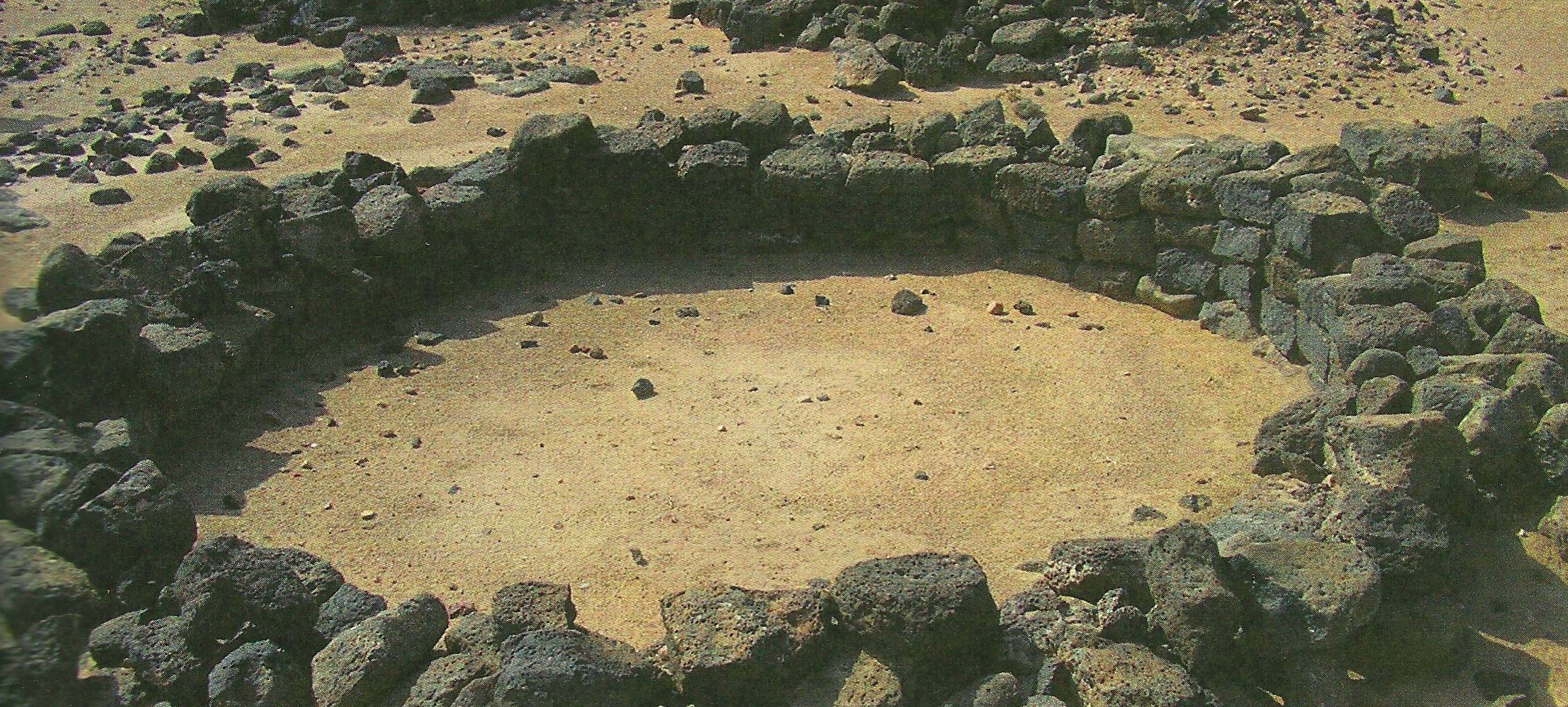

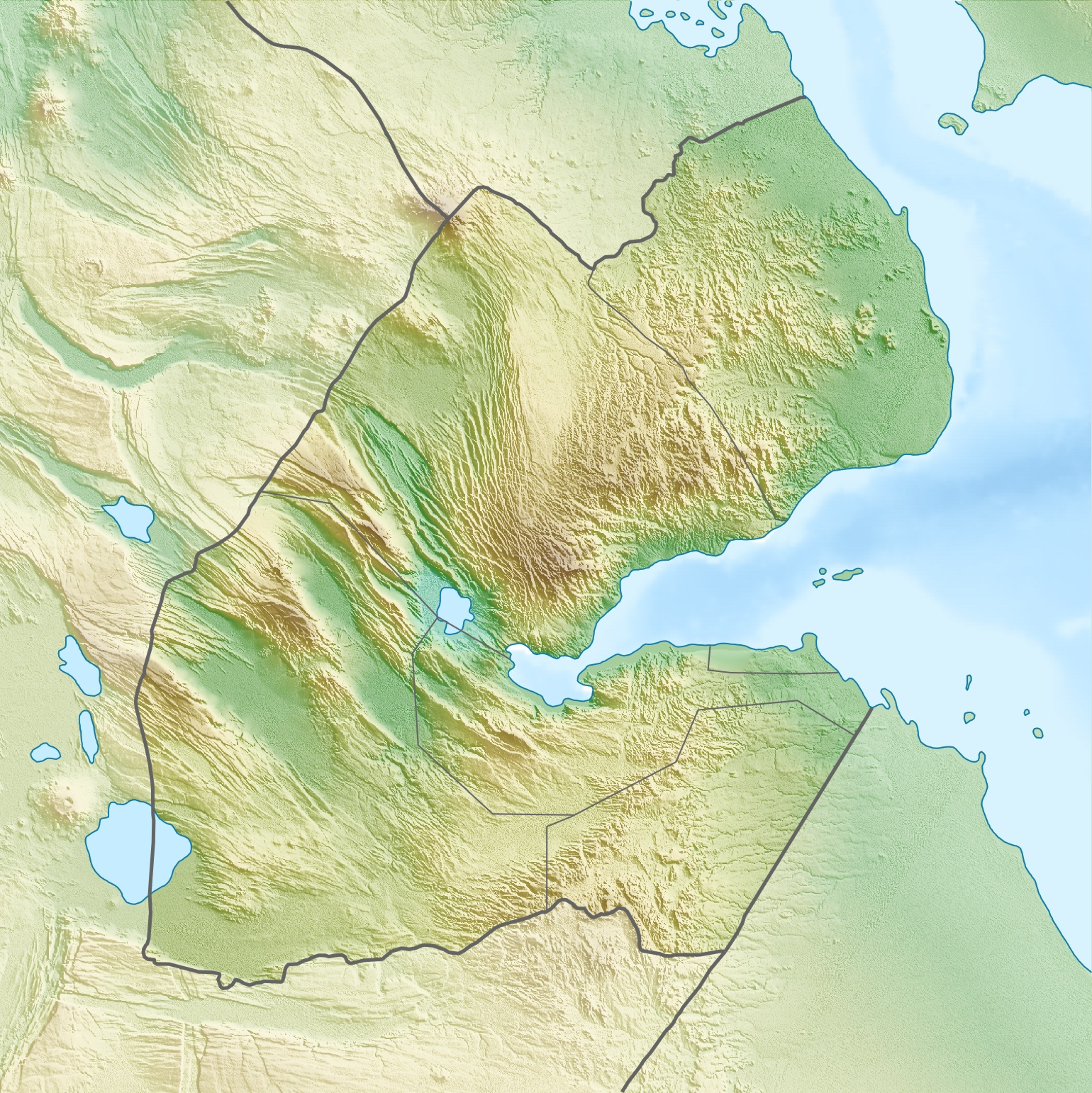
- Location within Djibouti
- 11°05′27″N 42°14′56″E
- Location: Dikhil Region, Djibouti

History
- Built: c. 3000 BC

Site notes
- Height: 402 metres (1,319 ft)
- Excavation dates: 1970

Handoga is located 14 km to the west of Dikhil, Djibouti. During the first excavations in 1970, archaeologists discovered foundations of stone houses and the walls of a stone edifice with a recess that faces Mecca.

== History ==
In 1986, the survey work sites were performed by R. Joussaume and researchers ISERST. The engravings oldest discovered to date are from the fourth or third millennium BC In the pre-Islamic period, the most famous is the site of Handoga there where the ruins of a village squares subcircular dry stone delivered different objects. An old settlement, Handoga is the site of numerous ancient ruins and buildings, many of obscure origins. Including ceramic shards matching vases used brazier, or containers that can hold water, several choppers and microliths, blades, drills, trenchers basalt, rhyolite or obsidian. A team of archaeologists discover an elephant date of 1.6 million years near the area. Also a pearl orange coralline, three glass paste, etc..

In 2007, the French archaeologists Xavier Gutherz and his team visited briefly the site and partially excavated an oval house which yielded more than 1,200 fragments of slag, iron pieces and copper ingots. The house was tentatively interpreted as a foundry.

Additional work has been completed on Handoga by a team at Statehorn: Archeology in the Horn of Africa during 2021 and 2022. A comprehensive map of the entire site was produced using high precision GPS. In addition, the surrounding area was surveyed and numerous structures were discovered that may be related to the medieval city in the area. Excavations were also performed on a compound, identified as C-5000, that contained four round structures surrounded by an outer wall. Differential uses of these spaces were found with some of the structures used for distribution, living, or cooking and others used as a dumping ground. Post holes and pits corresponding to older buildings were also found underneath the stone structures, designating the transition from traditional nomadic constructive techniques to ones based on stone-made architecture.

A large amount of archaeological materials have been discovered during the excavations on Handoga. Among the objects found were glass beads and bracelets, mother-of-pearl decorated pendants, many objects of metal and hundreds of fragments of cowry shells. There was also, an abundance of pottery materials, including hundreds of fragments of locally made pottery. Surprisingly, very little imported pottery was found on the site. A Chinese coin was also discovered at Handoga, the first one to be discovered in an archaeological context in the Horn of Africa.
