= Boul'aos =

Boul'aos بولعوس
- Town
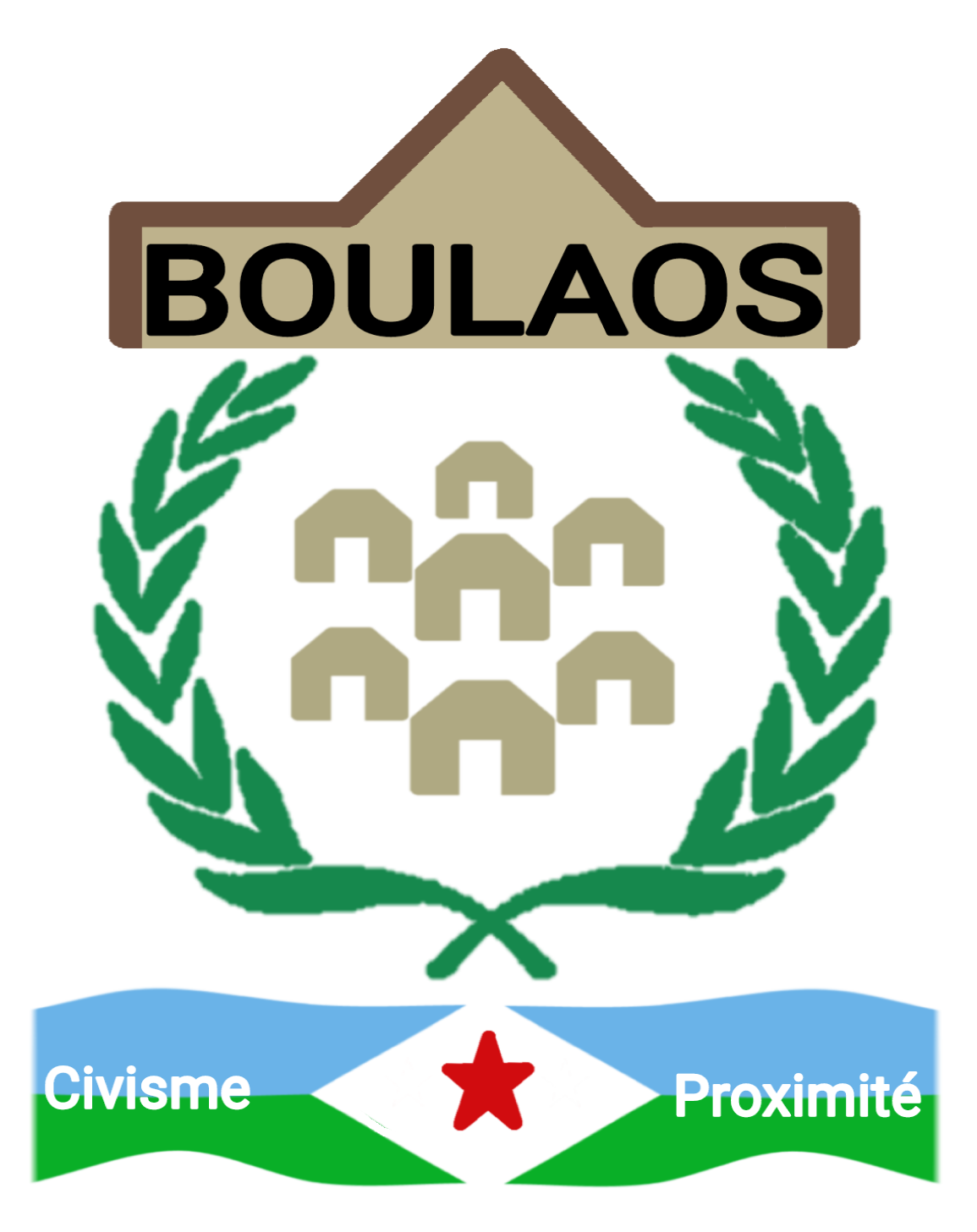
- Seal

- Location in Djibouti
- Coordinates: 11°35′N 43°9′E
- Country: Djibouti
- Region: Djibouti

Boul'aos (Arabic: بولعوس) is a town in Djibouti. It is located in the Djibouti region, just outside the capital.
