= Asa Koma =

Archaeological site in Djibouti

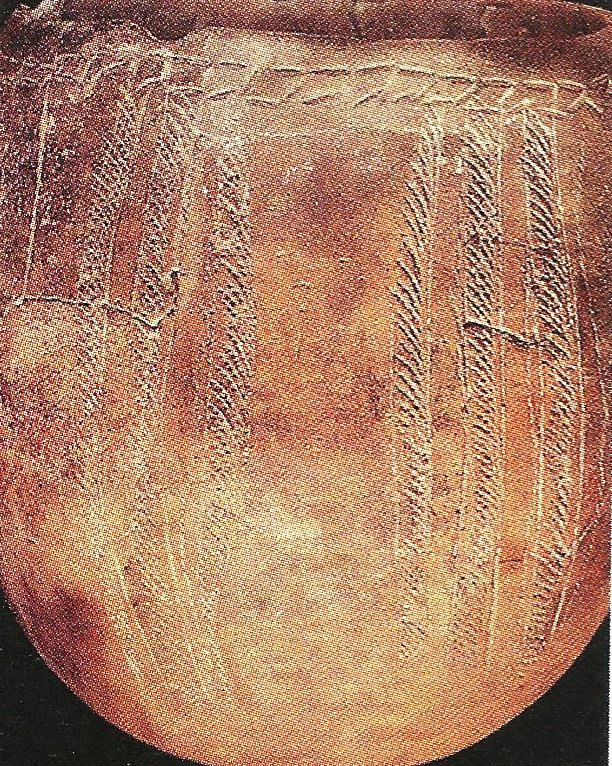
- Pottery found in Asa Koma
- Interactive map of Asa Koma
- Location: Asa Koma, Djibouti
- Access: Public

Asa Koma ("Red Hill") is an archaeological site in Djibouti.

== Overview ==
Asa Koma is an inland lake area on the Gobaad Plain. The site of Wakrita is a small Neolithic establishment located on a wadi in the tectonic depression of Gobaad in Djibouti in the Horn of Africa. The 2005 excavations yielded abundant ceramics that enabled us to define one Neolithic cultural facies of this region, which was also identified at the nearby site of Asa Koma. The faunal remains confirm the importance of fishing in Neolithic settlements close to Lake Abbe, but also the importance of bovine husbandry and, for the first time in this area, evidence for caprine herding practices. Radiocarbon dating places this occupation at the beginning of the 2nd millennium BC, similar in range to Asa Koma. These two sites represent the oldest evidence of herding in the region, and they provide a better understanding of the development of Neolithic societies in this region. Radiocarbon of the pottery dated the 2nd millennium BC. The ware is characterized by punctate and incision geometric designs, which bear a similarity to the Sabir culture phase 1 ceramics from Ma'layba in Southern Arabia. Additionally, ceramics like some of the pottery from Sihi on the Saudi coast and Subr on the Yemeni littoral have been found here.

Long-horned humpless cattle bones have also been discovered at Asa Koma, suggesting that domesticated cattle was present by around 3,500 years ago.
