= Timeline of Djibouti City =

The following is a timeline of the history of Djibouti, Djibouti.

== Prior to 20th century ==
- 1888 – Port established.
- 1892 – Capital of French Somaliland relocated to Djibouti from Obock.
- 1897 – Ethiopia relies on the Port of Djibouti as its official maritime outlet.

== 20th century ==
- 1903 – Dire Dawa-Djibouti railway begins operating.
- 1906 – Hamoudi Mosque built.
- 1914 – Roman Catholic Diocese of Djibouti established.
- 1917
  - Addis Ababa-Djibouti railway begins operating.
  - Population: 13,608.
- 1940 – Population: 26,987.
- 1948 – Djiboutian franc (currency) introduced.
- 1949 – Free port established.
- 1950 – Civil Ambouli aerodrome opens near city.
- 1954 – Electric power plant built.
- 1963 - Population: 41,217.
- 1964 – Cathédrale Notre-Dame du Bon-Pasteur de Djibouti consecrated.
- 1967
  - Radiodiffusion Télévision de Djibouti begins broadcasting.
  - City becomes capital of the French Territory of the Afars and the Issas.
- 1970 - Population: 62,000 (estimate).
- 1977
  - 8 May: Afars and Issas independence referendum, 1977.
  - City becomes capital of the Republic of Djibouti.
  - Population: 110,248.
  - Central Bank of Djibouti established.
- 1981 – Grand Bara road opens.
- 1986 – Tadjoura-Djibouti road opens.
- 1987 – Balbala becomes part of city.
- 1993 – Stade du Ville opens.
- 1995 – Population: 383,000.
- 1997 – Corrugated Iron Mosque built.
- 1999 – Djibouti Telecom headquartered in city.

== 21st century ==
- 2006 – Kempinski Hotel in business.
- 2009 - Population: 475,322.
- 2011 – 2011 Djiboutian protests.
- 2012 – Abdourahman Mohamed Guelleh becomes mayor.
- 2013
  - Parliamentary election held, with the ruling Union for the Presidential Majority winning most seats.
  - United States military drone base established at airport.
- 2014 – Africa Internet Summit held.
- 2017 - Addis Ababa–Djibouti Railway begins operating.

== See also ==
- Djibouti city history
- List of localities in Djibouti

== Bibliography ==
in English

- Collette Dubois; Frederick C. Gamst (2005). "Djibouti City". In Siegbert Uhlig (ed.). Encyclopaedia Aethiopica. Otto Harrassowitz Verlag. p. 183. ISBN 978-3-447-05607-6.

in French

- Ch. Brossard, ed. (1906). "Côte française des Somali: Villes principales: Djibouti". Colonies françaises. Géographie pittoresque et monumentale de la France (in French). Paris: Flammarion. hdl:2027/mdp.39015005579753. (+ table of contents)
- Colette Dubois (2002). "Cendrillon oubliée par la 'Fée électricité': Djibouti 1906-1977" [Cinderella forgotten by the 'electricity fairy': Djibouti 1906–1977]. Outre-mers (in French). 89 – via Persee.fr.
- "Histoire: Chronologie". Djibouti (in French). Petit Futé. 2012. p. 40+. ISBN 978-2-7469-6435-8.
- Moustapha Nour Ayeh (2015). "La ville de Djibouti entre intégration aux enjeux mondiaux et fragmentation urbaine" [City of Djibouti, between globalization and urban fragmentation]. Territoire en mouvement (in French) (27–28). doi:10.4000/tem.3183 – via Revues.org.
