= COVID-19 pandemic in Djibouti =

Ongoing COVID-19 viral pandemic in Djibouti

- Disease: COVID-19
- Pathogen: SARS-CoV-2
- Location: Djibouti
- First outbreak: Wuhan, Hubei, China
- Index case: Djibouti
- Arrival date: 14 March 2020 (6 years, 5 months and 1 week)
- Confirmed cases: 15,690 (updated 5 August 2026)
- Deaths: 189 (updated 5 August 2026)

The COVID-19 pandemic in Djibouti was a part of the worldwide pandemic of coronavirus disease 2019 (COVID-19) caused by severe acute respiratory syndrome coronavirus 2 (SARS-CoV-2). The virus spread to Djibouti in March 2020. It is a novel infectious disease caused by severe acute respiratory syndrome coronavirus 2 (SARS-CoV-2). Model-based simulations for Djibouti indicate that the 95% confidence interval for the time-varying reproduction number R_{t} has been rising since August 2020 and exceeded 1.0 until April 2021.

== Background ==
Several major world powers have a military presence in Djibouti, including China, France, Italy, Japan, and the United States. The country's first confirmed case was a member of the Spanish military, and the entire unit was quarantined at the French military base in Djibouti.

== Timeline ==
=== March 2020 ===
- On 18 March, the first COVID-19 case in Djibouti was confirmed, in a member of the Spanish Special Forces who arrived on 14 March for Operation Atalanta and tested positive on 17 March. The infected soldier did not interact with the local population, and Spain announced that the team would be repatriated. A contractor working for the United States Department of Defense at Camp Lemonnier, the largest and only permanent US military base in Djibouti, tested positive for COVID-19 the same month. A total of 30 cases were confirmed by the end of March.

=== April to December 2020 ===
- On 2 April, the World Bank approved US$5 million in emergency funding for Djibouti as part of the Djibouti COVID-19 Response Project. By 5 April, the number of confirmed cases had risen to 59.
- On 9 April, Djibouti recorded its first coronavirus death. There were 140 people infected with COVID-19, while 28 people recovered. On 23 April, the US military in Djibouti declared a public health emergency. By 24 April, Djibouti had the highest prevalence in Africa. A second case in Camp Lemonnier was confirmed in late April, triggering an indefinite lockdown.
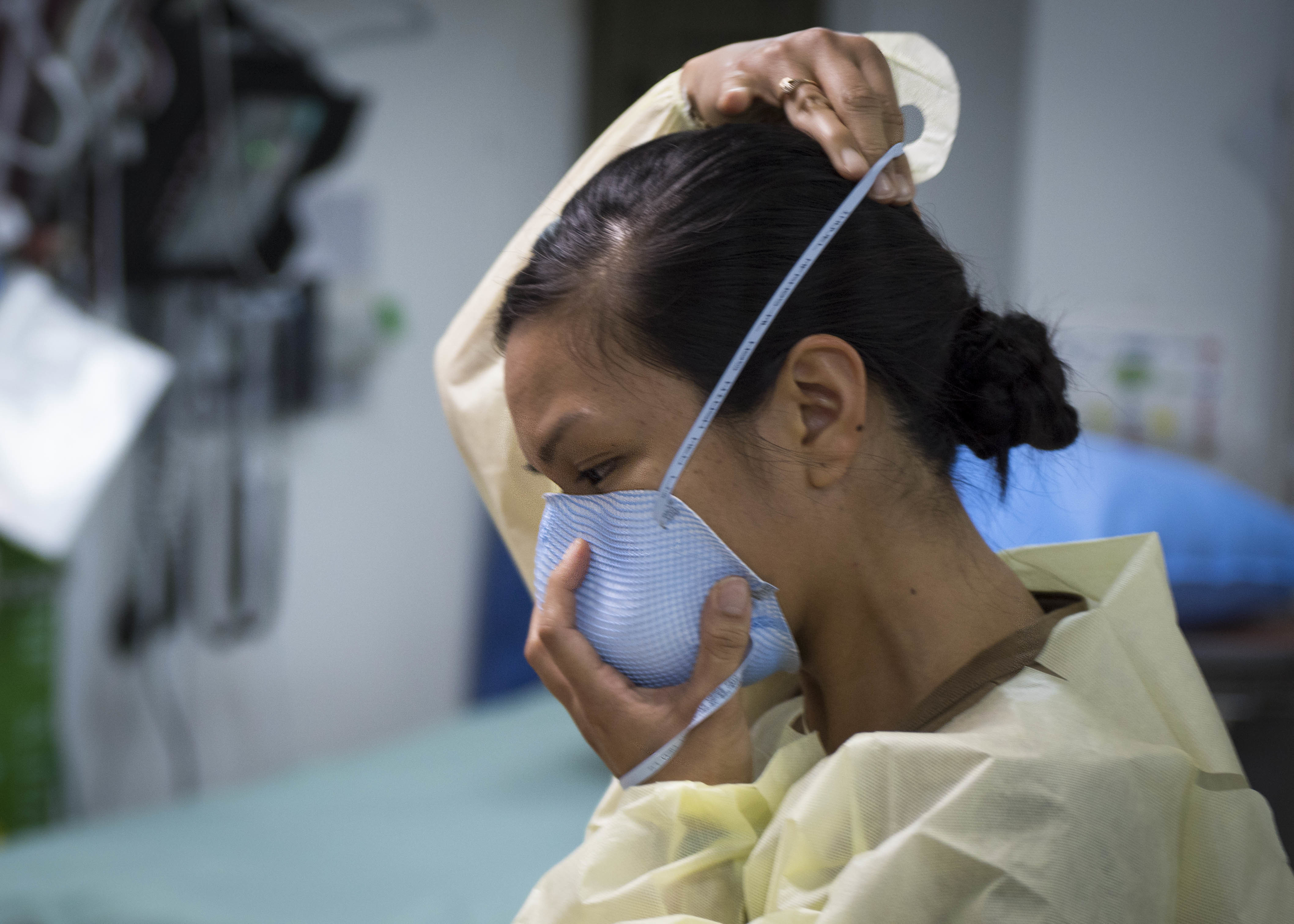
- U.S. Navy Lt. Gail Evangelista, nurse, assigned to Naval Hospital Rota, Spain, dons a facemask prior to interacting with a patient at the Michaud Expeditionary Medical Facility (EMF) at Camp Lemonnier, Djibouti, April 16, 2020.
  There were 1059 new cases in April, 2265 in May, 1328 in June, 399 in July, 306 in August, 29 in September, 145 in October, 116 in November, and 154 in December. The total number of cases stood at 1089 in April, 3354 in May, 4682 in June, 5081 in July, 5387 in August, 5416 in September, 5561 in October, 5677 in November, and 5831 in December.
- The number of recovered patients stood at 642 in April, 1504 in May, 4524 in June, 4996 in July, 5441 in October, 5582 in November, and 5728 in December, leaving 445 active cases at the end of April, 1826 at the end of May, 104 at the end of June, 27 at the end of July, 4 at the end of August, 11 at the end of September, 59 at the end of October, 34 at the end of November, and 42 at the end of December.
- The first two deaths occurred in April. The death toll rose to 24 in May, 54 in June, 58 in July, 60 in August, and 61 in September.

=== January to December 2021 ===
- Vaccination started on 15 March, initially with 24,000 doses of AstraZeneca's Covishield vaccine provided through COVAX.
- There were 101 new cases in January, 134 in February, 1936 in March, 3119 in April, 412 in May, 69 in June, 50 in July, 98 in August, 1061 in September, 667 in October, 26 in November, and 152 in December. The total number of cases stood at 5932 in January, 6066 in February, 8002 in March, 11121 in April, 11533 in May, 11602 in June, 11652 in July, 11750 in August, 12811 in September, 13478 in October, 13504 in November, and 13656 in December.
- The number of recovered patients stood at 5845 in January, 5897 in February, 6460 in March, 10816 in April, 11369 in May, 11443 in June, 11490 in July, 11589 in August, 12149 in September, 13249 in October, 13293 in November, and 13370 in December, leaving 42 active cases at the end of January, 106 at the end of February, 1472 at the end of March, 160 at the end of April, 10 at the end of May, 4 at the end of June, 6 at the end of July, 4 at the end of August, 495 at the end of September, 48 at the end of October, 25 at the end of November, and 97 at the end of December.
- The death toll rose to 63 in January, 70 in March, 145 in April, 154 in May, 155 in June, 156 in July, 157 in August, 167 in September, 181 in October, 186 in November, and 189 in December.

=== January to December 2022 ===
- There were 1795 new cases in January, 96 in February, 40 in March, 44 in April, 24 in May, 35 in June, 63 in July, and 207 in September. The total number of cases stood at 15451 in January, 15547 in February, 15587 in March, 15631 in April, 15655 in May, 15690 in June, 15753 in July, and 15960 in September.
- The number of recovered patients stood at 15175 in January, 15352 in February, 15391 in March, 15431 in April, 15451 in May, and 15497 in June, leaving 87 active cases at the end of January, 6 at the end of February, 7 at the end of March, 11 at the end of April, 15 at the end of May, and 4 at the end of June.
- No new deaths were recorded in 2022, leaving the death toll at 189.

=== January to December 2023 ===
- The total number of cases increased to 15961 in April.

== Government response ==
On 15 March, Djibouti announced that all commercial passenger flights would be suspended starting 18 March. Trains were also stopped on 20 March. The World Health Organization has provided personal protective equipment to Djibouti. The government announced the closure of all schools and places of worship on March 19 and 22 respectively. A countrywide lockdown was first announced on 23 March and progressively extended until 8 May.

== See also ==
- COVID-19 pandemic in Africa
- COVID-19 pandemic by country and territory
- COVID-19 vaccination in Djibouti
