= Abdoulkader Kamil Mohamed =

Prime Minister of Djibouti (2013–present)

- عبد القادر كامل محمد
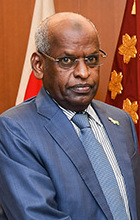
- Mohamed in 2019

Prime Minister of Djibouti
- Incumbent
- Assumed office 1 April 2013
- President: Ismaïl Omar Guelleh
- Preceded by: Dileita Mohamed Dileita

Personal details
- Born: 1 July 1952 (age 74) Souali, French Somaliland
- Party: People's Rally for Progress
- Education: University of Limoges

Abdoulkader Kamil Mohamed (Afar: Qabdulkadir Kamil Macammad, Arabic: عبد القادر كامل محمد; born 1 July 1952) is a Djiboutian politician who has been Prime Minister of Djibouti since 2013. A longtime member of the ruling People's Rally for Progress, he previously served as Minister of Agriculture from 2005 to 2011 and as Minister of Defense from 2011 to 2013. He is Afar-Somali, hailing from the prominent Warsangeli clan.

== Personal life ==
Mohamed was born in 1952 in Souali, situated in the northern Obock region of present-day Djibouti.

He studied at the University of Limoges in France, where he earned a degree in technical sciences, with a specialization in water management and the environment.

== Career ==
=== General ===
In a professional capacity, Mohamed began his career with Djibouti's water authority, which later became the ONED. He worked there first as interim Director General from 1978 to 1979, and then as Director General from 1983 to 2005.

In 1981, Mohamed joined the People's Rally for Progress (RPP) party. He gradually climbed the political association's ranks, until he was eventually elected as RPP Vice-President in September 2012. He was later appointed president of the Union for a Presidential Majority (UMP) in November 2012.

From May 2005 to May 2011, Mohamed served in the government of Djibouti as Minister of Agriculture. He was subsequently named Minister of Defense in May 2011.

Mohamed also acted as Deputy of the National Assembly. He was re-elected to the post on 22 February 2013, following a UMP parliamentary victory.

=== Prime minister ===
On 1 March 2013, Mohamed was appointed as Prime Minister of Djibouti. Replacing the long-serving Dileita Mohamed Dileita, he took office on 1 April.

Political offices
Preceded by Dileita Mohamed Dileita	Prime Minister of Djibouti; 2013–present	Incumbent
