= Ismaïl Omar Guelleh =

President of Djibouti since 1999

His Excellency Ismaïl Omar Guelleh
- Ismaaciil Cumar Geelle إسماعيل عمر جيله
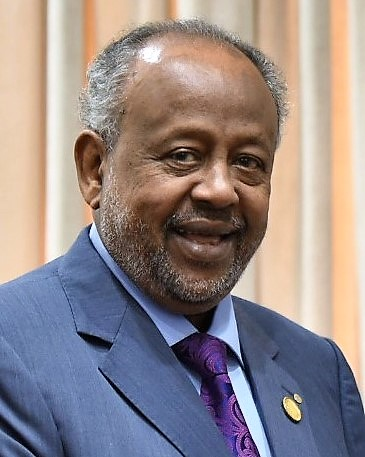
- Guelleh in 2018

2nd President of Djibouti
- Incumbent
- Assumed office 8 May 1999
- Prime Minister: Barkat Gourad Hamadou; Dileita Mohamed Dileita; Abdoulkader Kamil Mohamed
- Preceded by: Hassan Gouled Aptidon

Personal details
- Born: 27 November 1947 (age 78) Dire Dawa, Ethiopia
- Party: People's Rally for Progress
- Spouse: Kadra Mahamoud Haid
- Relations: Ridwan Ismaïl Saala
- Children: Haïbado Ismaïl Omar; Fatouma-Awo Ismaïl Omar; Nasir Omar Ismaïl Saalah (1st line); Ahmad Shaheer Mappingé (2nd line)

Ismaïl Omar Guelleh (Note: Somali: Ismaaciil Cumar Geelle; IPA: [ʔismaːʕiːl ʕumar ɡʊlːeː]; Arabic: إسماعيل عمر جيله; Arabic pronunciation: [ʔis.maː.ʕiːl ʕu.ma.ra d͡ʒiː.li.hi]) (born 27 November 1947), often referred to by his initials IOG, is a Djiboutian politician who has served as the President of Djibouti since 1999.

Guelleh was first elected as President in 1999 as the handpicked successor to his uncle, Hassan Gouled Aptidon, who had ruled Djibouti since independence in 1977. Guelleh was re-elected in 2005, 2011, 2016, 2021, and 2026. The elections were largely boycotted by the opposition amid complaints over widespread irregularities. Guelleh has been characterized as a dictator, and his rule has been criticized by human rights groups and foreign governments.

== Early life and political beginnings ==
Guelleh was born in Dire Dawa, Ethiopia, into the politically powerful Mamassan subclan of the Ciise Dir clan of the Somali ethnic group. The father of Ismaïl Omar Guelleh, son of Guelleh Batal, is Omar Guelleh, one of the first native teachers in the 1930s before working, following his father's path, on behalf of the Franco-Ethiopian Railway Company (CFE) which built the line connecting Djibouti to Addis Ababa and whose head office was in Dire Dawa. When Guelleh was younger he attended a traditional Islamic school. In 1960, Guelleh migrated to Djibouti, then known as French Somaliland, before finishing high school. In 1964, at the age of 18, Guelleh began working in the French territory's general information service, because he spoke Amharic, Somali, Arabic, French, Italian and English.

In 1975, he was suspended from his duties because he was suspected of transmitting information to the independence movement. He then became involved in the African People's League for Independence (LPAI) chaired by Hassan Gouled Aptidon, who campaigns for independence. Guelleh was elected into the LPAI's Central Committee in 1983 and subsequently became the director of a cultural commission in Paris. In 1987, he became a member of the party leadership.

After Djibouti became independent, he became head of the secret police and chief of the cabinet in the government of his uncle Hassan Gouled Aptidon, for whom he also served as chief of staff for more than two decades. He received training from the Somali National Security Service and then from the French Secret Service, and was intended to become his uncle's successor.

In February 1991 he attempted to annex Zeyla in Awdal, Somaliland to Djibouti in the 1991 Zeila incursion during the Somaliland War of Independence, however the Djiboutian-backed United Somali Front was shortly routed from the area by Somali National Movement (SNM) forces.

He became President of Djibouti in 1999.

== Presidency ==
=== Rise to power and first term (1999–2005) ===
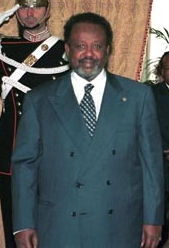
Guelleh in June 1999

Djibouti is one of five countries in Africa that have experienced instances of immediate successions from one family member to another.

On 4 February 1999, President Gouled Aptidon, uncle of Ismail Guelleh, announced his retirement at the time of the next election, and an extraordinary congress of his party, the ruling People's Rally for Progress (RPP), chose Guelleh as its presidential candidate, handpicked by Aptidon. As the joint candidate of the RPP and moderate wing of the Front for the Restoration of Unity and Democracy (FRUD), Guelleh won the presidential election held on 9 April 1999 with 74.02% of the vote, defeating his only challenger, the independent candidate Moussa Ahmed Idriss. He took office on 8 May. Moussa Ahmed Idriss was arrested the following September for "threatening the morale of the armed forces" and detained at an undisclosed location.

In December 2000, Guelleh sacked the chief of staff of the National Police Force, Yacin Yabeh, prompting policemen loyal to Yabeh to unsuccessfully rebel following his dismissal. Guelleh is credited with brokering a permanent peace agreement that year that brought to an end the country's post-independence ethnic conflict.

=== Second term (2005–2011) ===
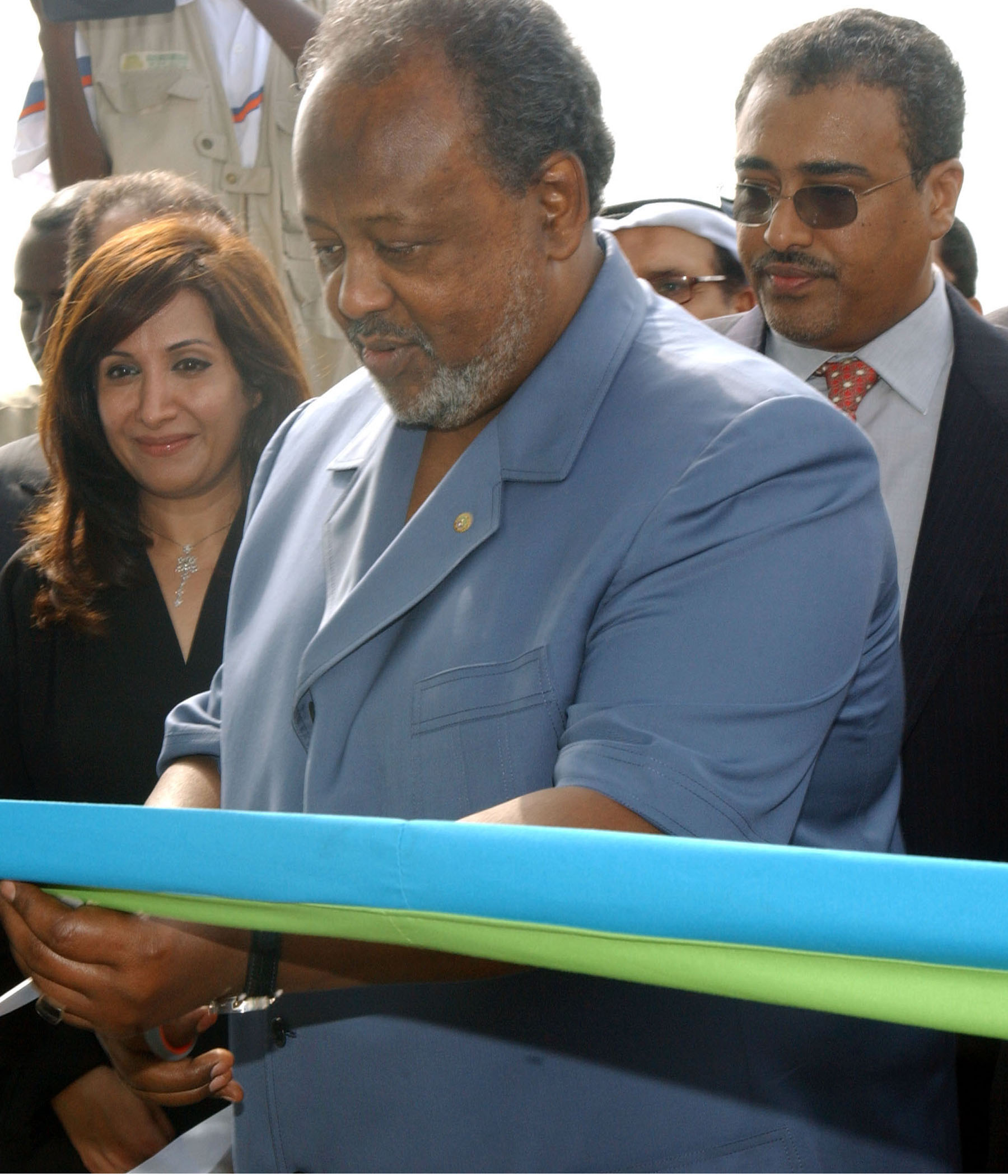
Guelleh cuts the inaugural ribbon at the new Defense Fuel Supply Point (DFSP) at the Port of Doralleh in February 2006

Guelleh was nominated by the RPP as its presidential candidate for a second time on 7 October 2004, at an Extraordinary Congress of the party. He was backed by several other parties and was the only candidate in the presidential election held on 8 April 2005. Brief protests against the elections erupted but were quickly suppressed by police. Without a challenger, Guelleh won 100% of the ballots cast and was sworn in for a second six-year term, which he said would be his last, on 7 May.

However, in 2010, Guelleh persuaded the National Assembly of Djibouti to amend the nation's Constitution, allowing him to stand for a third term. This cleared the way for him to place his name on the ballot in Djibouti's 2011 election. It also resulted in large protests beginning in 2010 similar to the larger movement for democracy in the Arab countries. The protests were quickly put down, opposition leaders arrested and international observers expelled or arrested.

=== Third term (2011–2016) ===
Opposition parties boycotted the election, leaving only one little-known candidate against him on the ballot. Guelleh won almost 80% of the vote. Human Rights Watch questioned the fairness of the election given that opposition leaders were jailed twice prior to polling. Guelleh again said that he would not run for another term.

Guelleh was also the winner of the 2016 election with about 87% of the popular vote. As in previous elections, the opposition had called for a country-wide boycott and demanded Guelleh conduct "transparent, free, fair and just elections." Opposition leaders and human rights groups complained of repression and police brutality in the run-up to the polls. After interviewing an opposition leader, a BBC team was arrested and expelled shortly before the vote.

=== Fourth term (2016–2021) ===
He was re-elected for a fifth term in the 2021 landslide election. One opposition candidate, Zakaria Ismail Farah, new to electoral politics, ran in the election, accusing the government of ballot-box stuffing and of barring his delegates from accessing polling stations to monitor the voting process. Other major opposition parties did not run candidates, accusing Guelleh of dictatorship.

=== Fifth term (2021–2026) ===
In June 2021, Guelleh made vaccination against COVID-19 compulsory for both citizens and foreign residents.

Throughout that same month, Guelleh reshuffled his diplomatic corps, recalling seven ambassadors and appointing new ones to several countries across the Middle East.

=== Sixth term (2026-present) ===
Following the 2026 Djiboutian presidential election on 10 April 2026, Guelleh was reelected to a sixth term as president with 97.81% of the vote. He was inaugurated on 9 May and unveiled a new cabinet on 17 May.

== Political assessment ==
=== Governance ===
Throughout his presidency, Guelleh has worked to install members of his family in important political and economic positions. A central role is occupied by his wife, Kadra Mahamoud Haid, who acts as the de facto vice-president, and his two daughters: Haibado, functioning as an important advisor to Guelleh, and Fatouma-Awo, heavily involved in the country's business activities. His son in law, Djama Elmi Okieh, is the Minister of Health.

One of the President's half-brothers, Saad Omar Guelleh, is the General Manager of the economically paramount Port of Djibouti, while first cousin Djama Ali Guelleh has been the Director General of state-owned utilities company Electricité de Djibouti (EDD) since 1986, more than a decade before Guelleh came to power.

Owing to this intricate blurring of state functions and the ruling clan, Guelleh has been able to exercise strict control over the country's political, economic and judiciary affairs, aided by his strong grip on the police, military and other security forces. This has guaranteed that "the Guelleh clan's domination of all public affairs prevailed."

A message sent from the US Embassy in Djibouti in 2004 and published on WikiLeaks described Djibouti as "less a country than a commercial city state controlled by one man, Ismail Omar Guelleh."

In its 2020 country report on Human Rights Practices, the US government identified "unlawful or arbitrary killings", "cases of cruel, inhuman, or degrading treatment or punishment by the government", and "arbitrary or unlawful interference with privacy; serious restrictions on free expression, the press, and the internet, including violence", among others, as "significant human rights issues" in the country.

=== Closer relations with China ===
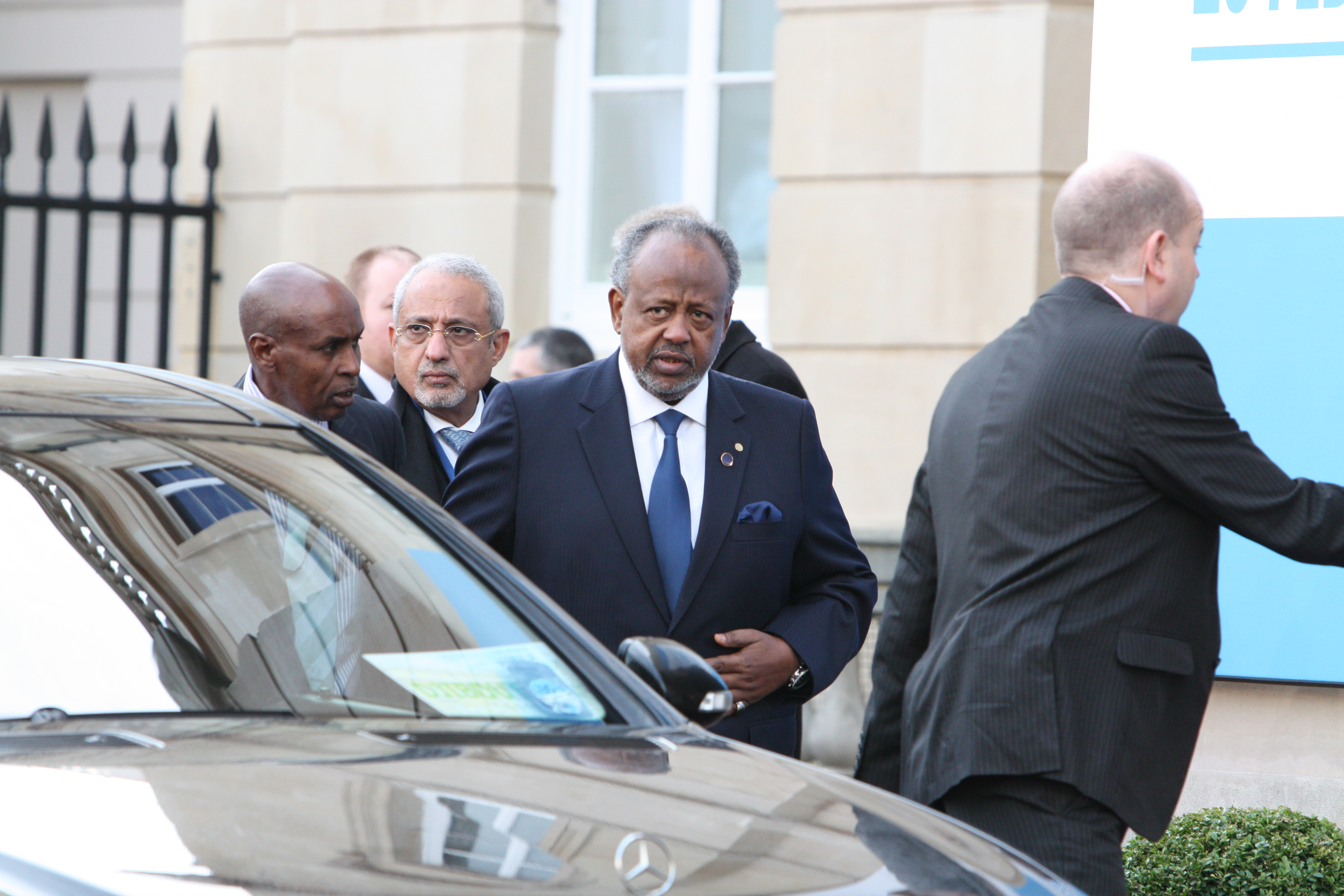
Guelleh arriving at the London Somalia Conference, 2012

Guelleh has made use of his country's strategic position for years, marked by large infrastructure investments, especially in ports and logistics. Since 2013, Guelleh has pursued closer economic and political relations with China, which coincided with Beijing's growing strategic interest in the Middle East and Africa through the launch of the Belt and Road Initiative that year.

The ensuing great power competition for the country has increased Djibouti's scope for maneuver, but China's influence has also grown over Djibouti, having established a naval base there in 2017 and triggering concerns among Djibouti's traditional Western allies that Beijing's authoritarian governance style is encouraging more autocratic behavior on Guelleh's part as well.

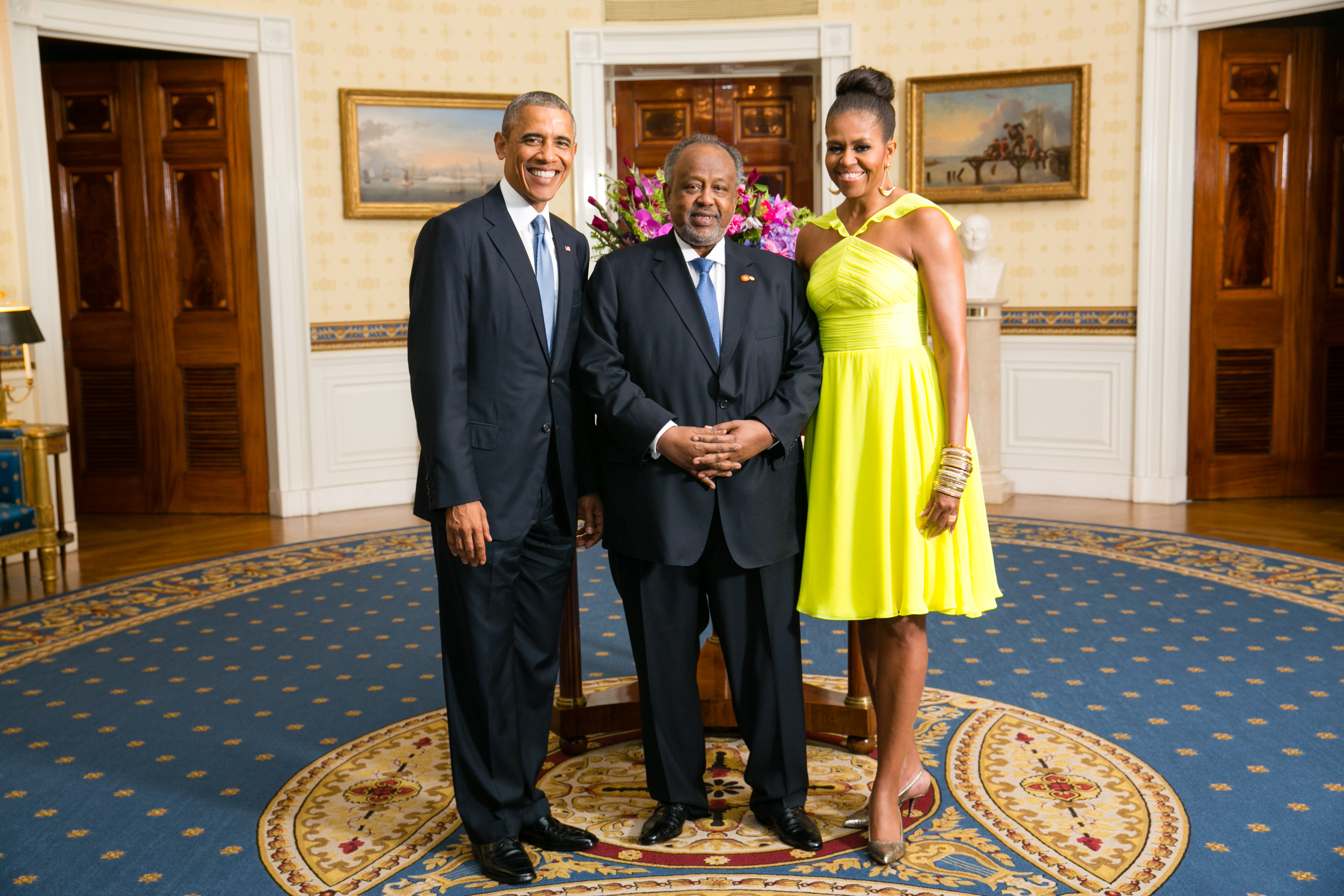
Guelleh with U.S. President Barack Obama and First Lady Michelle Obama, 2014

The influx of Chinese investments into the country has furthered Guelleh's development plan based on the Singapore model. It is often understood as "an authoritarian government delivering national prosperity through rigid planning and a singular focus on economic development at the expense of democracy, human rights, and basic freedoms." Guelleh has frequently made references to following Singapore's path in official speeches, hoping to transform Djibouti into the "Singapore of Africa" by capitalizing on the Port of Djibouti's growing role as a strategically located maritime trading hub.

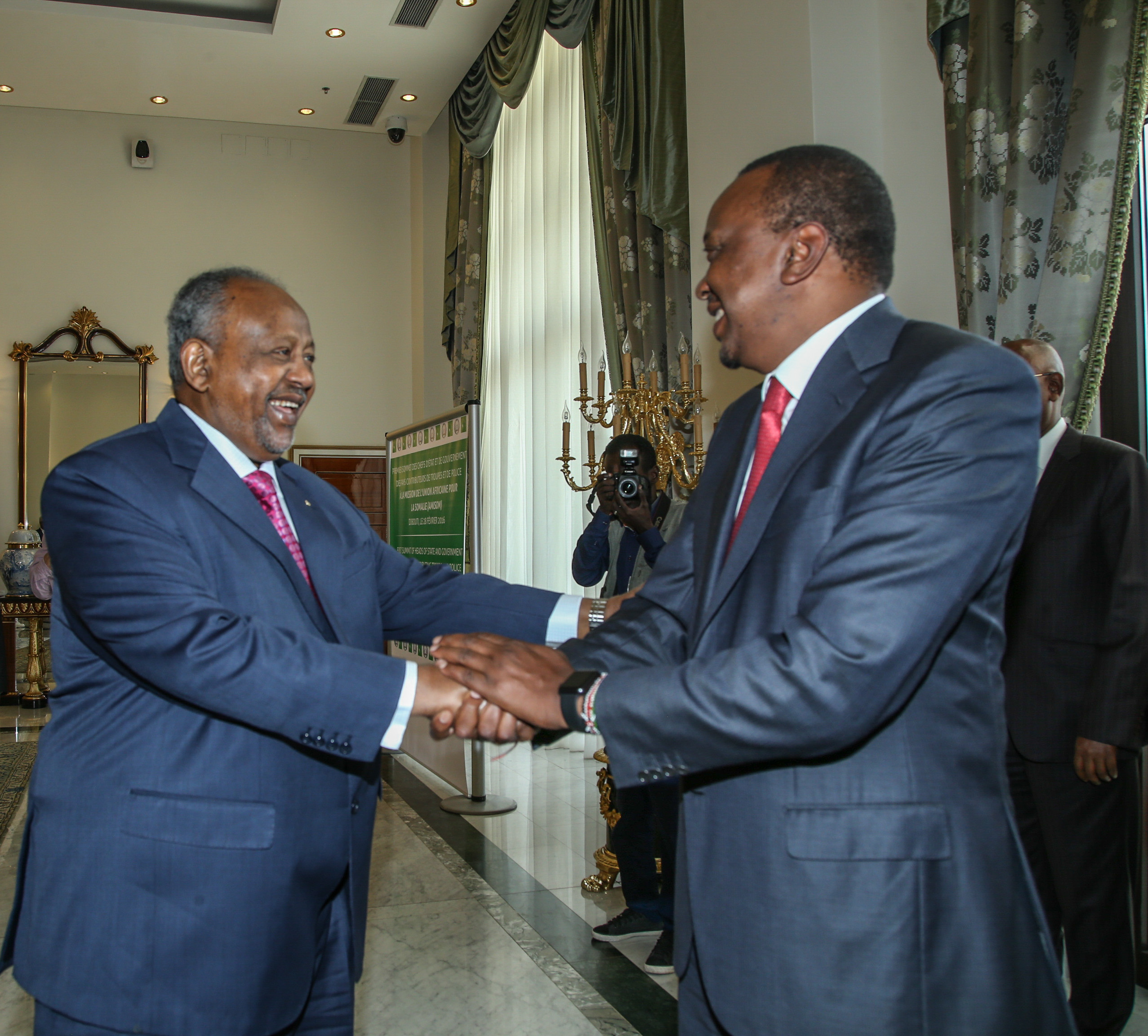
Kenyan President Uhuru Kenyatta and Guelleh shake hands at the AMISOM Heads of State Summit, 2016

However, experts regard Djibouti's continued government corruption and favoring of Chinese investors as a hindrance to that development strategy paying off. For example, in 2012 the Djibouti government sold its Doraleh Container Terminal concession of the Port of Djibouti to a Chinese competitor of concession partner DP World, an UAE-based port operator. In February 2018, Ismaïl Guelleh revoked DP World's concession by presidential decree, transferring its assets to a state-run company. Using Chinese funding, that same year Djibouti also opened a long-term project to build what is projected to be Africa's greatest free trade zone.

In 2020, the London Court of International Arbitration ruled Djibouti's expropriation illegal and ordered the original concession rights are to be restored. The Court had previously ordered the country to pay $533 million in compensation to the DP World company. Djibouti rejected the Court's ruling and handed a quarter of the port's stake to China Merchants Ports Holdings.

=== Economy ===
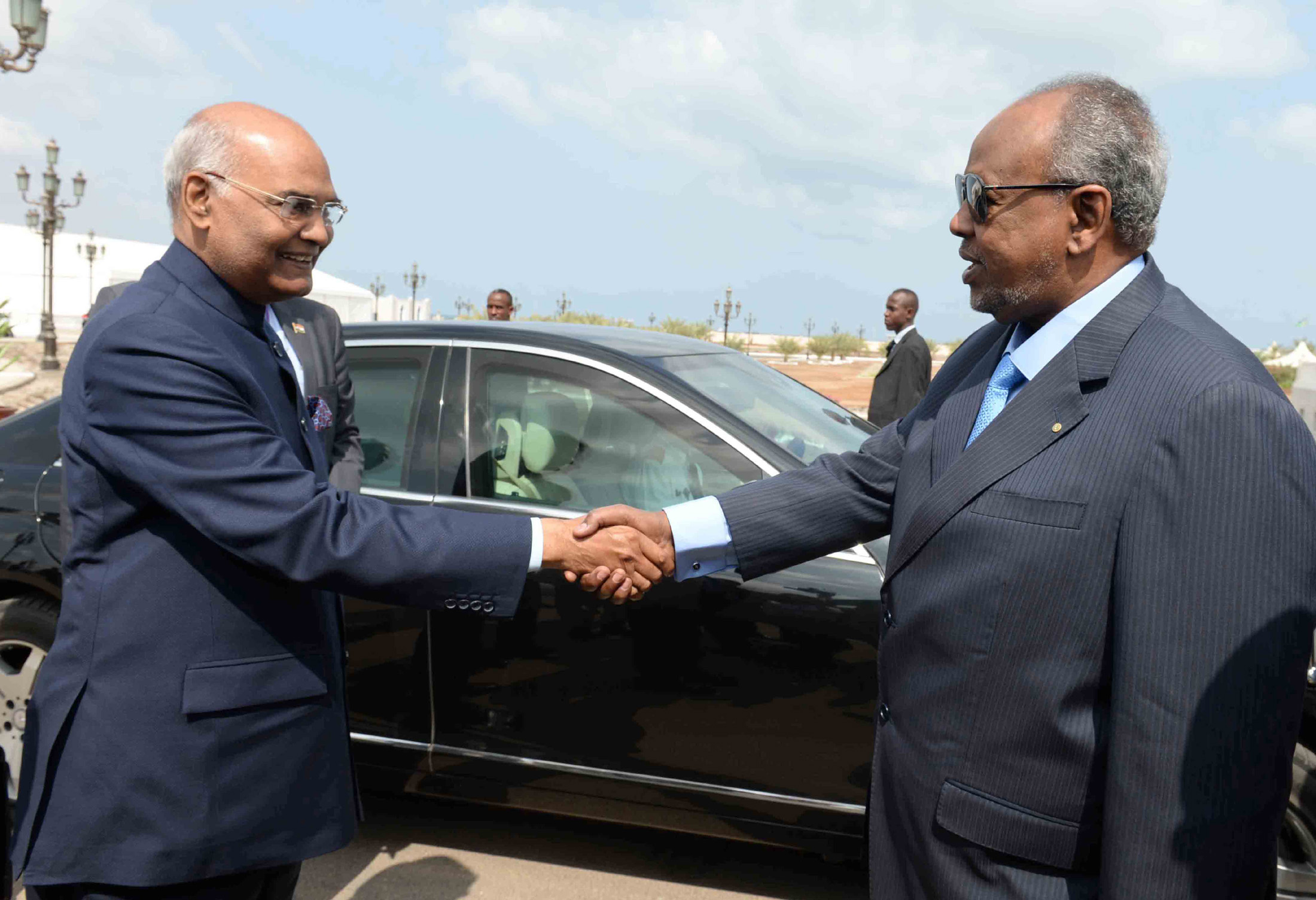
Indian President Ram Nath Kovind and Ismail Omar Guelleh in October 2017

While the FDI-driven policy into port and logistics infrastructure pursued by Guelleh has been responsible for steady economic growth, it has created a service-dependent and capital-intensive economy with low exports and opportunities for job creation. Indeed, unemployment remains an enduring issue that disproportionally affects the young. According to a 2015 employment survey, Djibouti's unemployment rate was at 39 percent, where only 25 percent of working age people were employed. A more recent estimate puts unemployment of the young at 80 percent.

Furthermore, the investment projects behind the country's economic growth throughout the years were financed by external debt, which has led to high levels of debt ownership by foreign actors, particularly China. Overall, the country's economy was ranked as "mostly unfree" by the Heritage Foundation's 2021 Index of Economic Freedom.

The expansion of the Berbera port in Somaliland by DP World, which would reduce landlocked Ethiopia's dependence on Djibouti for large parts of its trade, has been speculated to pose a threat to the port of Djibouti's regional dominance. Guelleh has dismissed such claims.

=== Regional security ===
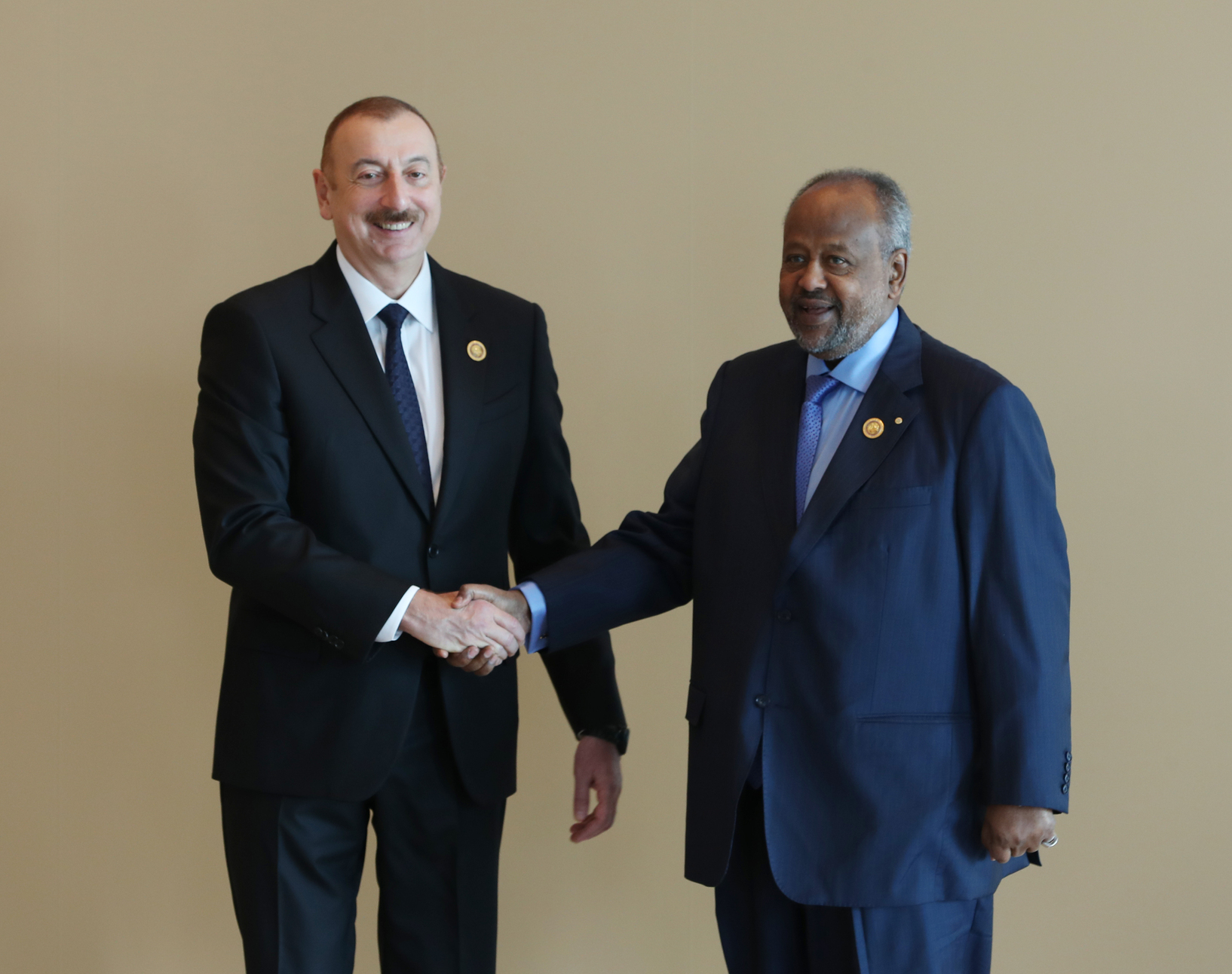
Guelleh with President of Azerbaijan Ilham Aliyev at the 18th Non-Aligned Movement summit in Baku, October 2019.

Djibouti under Guelleh's rule has remained a stable country within a conflict-ridden region. Guelleh's presidency has seen the signing of a peace agreement between warring ethnic tribes in 2000 and the resolution of a decade-long border dispute between Djibouti and Eritrea in 2018. The 2018 peace treaty between Ethiopia and Eritrea is expected to reduce Djibouti's port revenues in the long-run and could in turn lead to Guelleh becoming unable to maintain his stringent control over the country.

In 2020, Guelleh hosted the leaders of Somalia and its break-away Republic of Somaliland as well as Ethiopia's Prime Minister Abiy Ahmed for peace talks.

Guelleh expressed strong support for Ethiopia's Prime Minister Abiy Ahmed in the Tigray War between the government and the rebels, saying that he had chosen to "restore law and order at the federal level, and punish those seeking to break up the country" and dismissed the prospect of negotiations, saying that the Tigray People's Liberation Front had "structured itself so as to bring the central government to its knees" and that talks could "only lead to the partition of Ethiopia", setting a precedent for secession by other groups in the region.

=== Succession ===
Guelleh's long-time rule opened questions about his eventual succession, with a trusted, hand-picked candidate chosen from within his inner circle being widely predicted. Guelleh's son-in-law and minister of health, Djama Elmi Okieh, was reported to be Guelleh's designated successor, but after 2018 fell out of favor after an alleged affair with an employee and subsequent divorce. Another favored candidate is Naguib Abdallah Kamil, a son of First Lady Kadra Mahamoud Haid from a previous marriage.

By retaining Djibouti's main political players in their respective government positions, Guelleh increased the risk for internal power struggles. As of May 2021, Prime Minister Abdoulkader Kamil Mohamed and Finance Minister Ilyas Moussa Dawaleh were considered prime contenders for leadership struggles in the run-up to elections in 2026, with Foreign Minister Mahamoud Ali Youssouf also mentioned as a likely player in intra-governmental fights for power.

== Personal life ==
Ismail Guelleh is married with four children.

Following a visit of Guelleh and his entourage to Paris in late 2018, France's National Financial Prosecutor's Office opened a preliminary investigation into the alleged fraudulent acquisition of several properties in the city. The investigation, launched after a complaint from anti-corruption NGO Sherpa and focusing on Guelleh's wife, eldest daughter and son in law, is ongoing as of July 2021.

He owns a property in Dubai.

== Electoral history ==
Electoral history of Ismaïl Omar Guelleh
Year	Office	Party	Votes received				Result
Year	Office	Party	Total	%	P.	Swing	Result
1999	President of Djibouti	PRP	76,853	74.02%	1st	—N/a	Won
2005	President of Djibouti	PRP	144,433	100.00%	1st	+25.98	Unopposed
2011	President of Djibouti	PRP	89,951	80.64%	1st	-19.36	Won
2016	President of Djibouti	PRP	111,389	87.07%	1st	+6.43	Won
2021	President of Djibouti	PRP	155,291	97.30%	1st	+10.23	Won
2026	President of Djibouti	PRP	204,874	97.81%	1st	+0.51	Won

== Honours ==
Guelleh was awarded the Padma Vibhushan, India's second-highest civilian award, on 25 January 2019 for his role in the safe evacuation of Indian citizens from Yemen during the country's ongoing civil war.

== See also ==
Political offices
Preceded by Hassan Gouled Aptidon	President of Djibouti; 1999–present	Incumbent
