= 2021 Africa Cup of Nations qualification =

Tournament details
- Dates: 9 October 2019 – 15 June 2021
- Teams: 52 (from 1 confederation)

Tournament statistics
- Matches played: 150
- Goals scored: 335 (2.23 per match)
- Top scorer(s): (Nigeria) Victor Osimhen (Zambia) Patson Daka (5 goals each)

The 2021 Africa Cup of Nations qualification matches were organized by the Confederation of African Football (CAF) to decide the participating teams for the 2021 Africa Cup of Nations, the 33rd edition of the international men's football championship of Africa. A total of 24 teams qualified to play in the final tournament, including Cameroon who qualified automatically as hosts.

== Draw ==
The draw took place on 18 July 2019, 18:30 CAT (UTC+2), in Cairo, Egypt. A total of 52 teams entered the tournament, including the hosts Cameroon, while Eritrea and Somalia chose not to enter the qualifiers.

=== Seeding ===
The teams were seeded based upon their June 2019 FIFA World Rankings (ranking shown in parentheses). All 44 teams from Pot 1 to Pot 4 entered the competition at the group stage, while teams from Pot 5 had to compete in the preliminary round in order to advance to the group stage.

Each group contained one team each from Pot 1, 2 and 3. Groups from A to D contained a winning team from the preliminary round, while groups from E to L contained a team from Pot 4. Teams in bold letters qualified for the final tournament.

Pot	Pot 1	Pot 2	Pot 3	Pot 4	Pot 5
Teams	Senegal (22); Tunisia (25); Nigeria (45); Morocco (47); DR Congo (49); Ghana (50); Cameroon (51); Egypt (58); Burkina Faso (59); Mali (62); Ivory Coast (62); Algeria (68)	Guinea (71); South Africa (72); Cape Verde (76); Uganda (80); Zambia (81); Benin (88); Gabon (89); Congo (90); Mauritania (103); Niger (104); Kenya (105); Libya (105)	Madagascar (108); Zimbabwe (109); Central African Republic (112); Namibia (113); Sierra Leone (115); Mozambique (117); Guinea-Bissau (118); Angola (123); Malawi (126); Togo (128); Sudan (130); Tanzania (131)	Burundi (134); Rwanda (136); Equatorial Guinea (141); Eswatini (141); Lesotho (145); Botswana (147); Comoros (148); Ethiopia (150)	Liberia (153); Mauritius (157); Gambia (161); South Sudan (168); Chad (176); São Tomé and Príncipe (185); Seychelles (194); Djibouti (195)

== Schedule ==
Map of countries qualified for the AFCON 2021 Qualified Failed to qualify Banned or did not enter Not a member of CAF

The schedule of the qualifying competition was as follows. After the rescheduling of the final tournament from June/July to January/February, the dates of matchdays 3–6 of the group stage were also rescheduled.

Due to the COVID-19 pandemic, all matches of matchdays 3 and 4 scheduled for March 2020 were postponed until further notice. FIFA recommended that all June 2020 international matches (matchday 5) be postponed, and also postponed the September 2020 window (matchday 6) for CAF.

On 30 June 2020, the CAF announced the 2021 Africa Cup of Nations final tournament had been postponed from January 2021 to January 2022, without announcing the new dates of the remaining qualifiers. On 19 August 2020, CAF announced the second revised dates for both Africa Cup of Nations and FIFA World Cup qualifiers.

Round	Matchday	Dates			Matches
Round	Matchday	Original dates	Revised dates	Second revised dates	Matches
Preliminary round	First leg	9 October 2019			Team 1 vs. Team 2
Preliminary round	Second leg	13 October 2019			Team 2 vs. Team 1
Group stage	Matchday 1	13–16 November 2019			Team 1 vs. Team 2, Team 3 vs. Team 4
Group stage	Matchday 2	17–19 November 2019			Team 4 vs. Team 1, Team 2 vs. Team 3
Group stage	Matchday 3	31 August – 8 September 2020	23–31 March 2020	9–17 November 2020	Team 1 vs. Team 3, Team 2 vs. Team 4
Group stage	Matchday 4	31 August – 8 September 2020	23–31 March 2020	9–17 November 2020	Team 3 vs. Team 1, Team 4 vs. Team 2
Group stage	Matchday 5	5–13 October 2020	1–9 June 2020	22–30 March 2021, 15 June 2021	Team 2 vs. Team 1, Team 4 vs. Team 3
Group stage	Matchday 6	9–17 November 2020	31 August – 8 September 2020	22–30 March 2021, 15 June 2021	Team 1 vs. Team 4, Team 3 vs. Team 2

== Preliminary round ==
All eight teams from Pot 5 were drawn into four ties and played in home-and-away two-legged format. The four winners advanced to the group stage to join the 44 teams which entered directly. They went to positions A4, B4, C4 and D4 respectively based on their tie number.

Team 1	Agg.	Team 2	1st leg	2nd leg
Liberia	1–1 (4–5 p)	Chad	1–0	0–1
South Sudan	3–1	Seychelles	2–1	1–0
Mauritius	2–5	São Tomé and Príncipe	1–3	1–2
Djibouti	2–2 (2–3 p)	Gambia	1–1	1–1

== Group stage ==
The 48 teams were drawn into twelve groups of four teams (from Group A to Group L). Teams consisted of the 44 teams which entered directly, in addition to the four winners of the preliminary round whose identity was not known at the time of the draw.

The 2021 Africa Cup of Nations hosts, Cameroon, participated in the qualifiers with the team guaranteed a spot in the finals regardless of its ranking in the group. Their matches and results counted in determining the qualification of the other teams from their group. If Cameroon had finished out of top two teams in their group, a group runner-up would not have qualified for the main tournament.

Tiebreakers

The teams were ranked according to points (3 points for a win, 1 point for a draw, 0 points for a loss). If tied on points, tiebreakers were applied in the following order (Regulations Article 14):

1. Points in head-to-head matches among tied teams;
2. Goal difference in head-to-head matches among tied teams;
3. Goals scored in head-to-head matches among tied teams;
4. Away goals scored in head-to-head matches among tied teams;
5. If more than two teams were tied, and after applying all head-to-head criteria above, a subset of teams were still tied, all head-to-head criteria above were reapplied exclusively to this subset of teams;
6. Goal difference in all group matches;
7. Goals scored in all group matches;
8. Away goals scored in all group matches;
9. Drawing of lots.
The twelve group winners and runners-up qualified for the final tournament.

=== Group A ===
Pos	Team	Pld	W	D	L	GF	GA	GD	Pts	Qualification	Mali	Guinea	Namibia	Chad
1	Mali	6	4	1	1	10	4	+6	13	Final tournament	—	2–2	1–0	3–0 (Note: On 22 March 2021, CAF disqualified Chad due to government interference. As a result, the two final matches involving Chad were cancelled and awarded as 3–0 wins for their opponents.)
2	Guinea	6	3	2	1	8	5	+3	11	Final tournament	1–0	—	2–0	1–0
3	Namibia	6	3	0	3	8	7	+1	9		1–2	2–1	—	2–1
4	Chad	6	0	1	5	2	12	−10	1		0–2	1–1	0–3	—

Source: CAF

=== Group B ===
Pos	Team	Pld	W	D	L	GF	GA	GD	Pts	Qualification	Burkina Faso	Malawi	Uganda	South Sudan
1	Burkina Faso	6	3	3	0	6	2	+4	12	Final tournament	—	3–1	0–0	1–0
2	Malawi	6	3	1	2	4	5	−1	10	Final tournament	0–0	—	1–0	1–0
3	Uganda	6	2	2	2	3	2	+1	8		0–0	2–0	—	1–0
4	South Sudan	6	1	0	5	2	6	−4	3		1–2	0–1	1–0	—

Source: CAF

=== Group C ===
Pos	Team	Pld	W	D	L	GF	GA	GD	Pts	Qualification	Ghana	Sudan	South Africa	São Tomé and Príncipe
1	Ghana	6	4	1	1	9	3	+6	13	Final tournament	—	2–0	2–0	3–1
2	Sudan	6	4	0	2	9	3	+6	12	Final tournament	1–0	—	2–0	4–0
3	South Africa	6	3	1	2	8	7	+1	10		1–1	1–0	—	2–0
4	São Tomé and Príncipe	6	0	0	6	3	16	−13	0		0–1	0–2	2–4	—

Source: CAF

=== Group D ===
Pos	Team	Pld	W	D	L	GF	GA	GD	Pts	Qualification	Gambia	Gabon	Democratic Republic of the Congo	Angola
1	Gambia	6	3	1	2	9	7	+2	10 (Note: Tied on head-to-head points (3), on head-to-head goal difference (0), on head-to-head goals scored (3), on head-to-head away goals scored (1) and on overall goal difference (+2). Overall goals scored: Gambia 9, Gabon 8.)	Final tournament	—	2–1	2–2	1–0
2	Gabon	6	3	1	2	8	6	+2	10	Final tournament	2–1	—	3–0	2–1
3	DR Congo	6	2	3	1	4	5	−1	9		1–0	0–0	—	0–0
4	Angola	6	1	1	4	4	7	−3	4		1–3	2–0	0–1	—

Source: CAF

=== Group E ===
Pos	Team	Pld	W	D	L	GF	GA	GD	Pts	Qualification	Morocco	Mauritania	Burundi	Central African Republic
1	Morocco	6	4	2	0	10	1	+9	14	Final tournament	—	0–0	1–0	4–1
2	Mauritania	6	2	3	1	5	4	+1	9	Final tournament	0–0	—	1–1	2–0
3	Burundi	6	1	2	3	6	10	−4	5		0–3	3–1	—	2–2
4	Central African Republic	6	1	1	4	5	11	−6	4		0–2	0–1	2–0	—

Source: CAF

=== Group F ===
Pos	Team	Pld	W	D	L	GF	GA	GD	Pts	Qualification	Cameroon	Cape Verde	Rwanda	Mozambique
1	Cameroon	6	3	2	1	8	4	+4	11	Final tournament	—	0–0	0–0	4–1
2	Cape Verde	6	2	4	0	6	3	+3	10	Final tournament	3–1	—	0–0	2–2
3	Rwanda	6	1	3	2	1	3	−2	6		0–1	0–0	—	1–0
4	Mozambique	6	1	1	4	5	10	−5	4		0–2	0–1	2–0	—

Source: CAF

=== Group G ===
Pos	Team	Pld	W	D	L	GF	GA	GD	Pts	Qualification	Egypt	Comoros	Kenya	Togo
1	Egypt	6	3	3	0	10	3	+7	12	Final tournament	—	4–0	1–1	1–0
2	Comoros	6	2	3	1	4	6	−2	9	Final tournament	0–0	—	2–1	0–0
3	Kenya	6	1	4	1	7	7	0	7		1–1	1–1	—	1–1
4	Togo	6	0	2	4	3	8	−5	2		1–3	0–1	1–2	—

Source: CAF

=== Group H ===
Pos	Team	Pld	W	D	L	GF	GA	GD	Pts	Qualification	Algeria	Zimbabwe	Zambia	Botswana
1	Algeria	6	4	2	0	19	6	+13	14	Final tournament	—	3–1	5–0	5–0
2	Zimbabwe	6	2	2	2	6	8	−2	8	Final tournament	2–2	—	0–2	0–0
3	Zambia	6	2	1	3	8	12	−4	7		3–3	1–2	—	2–1
4	Botswana	6	1	1	4	2	9	−7	4		0–1	0–1	1–0	—

Source: CAF

=== Group I ===
Pos	Team	Pld	W	D	L	GF	GA	GD	Pts	Qualification	Senegal	Guinea-Bissau	Republic of the Congo	Eswatini
1	Senegal	6	4	2	0	10	2	+8	14	Final tournament	—	2–0	2–0	1–1
2	Guinea-Bissau	6	3	0	3	9	7	+2	9	Final tournament	0–1	—	3–0	3–0
3	Congo	6	2	2	2	5	5	0	8		0–0	3–0	—	2–0
4	Eswatini	6	0	2	4	3	13	−10	2		1–4	1–3	0–0	—

Source: CAF

=== Group J ===
Pos	Team	Pld	W	D	L	GF	GA	GD	Pts	Qualification	Tunisia	Equatorial Guinea	Tanzania	Libya
1	Tunisia	6	5	1	0	14	5	+9	16	Final tournament	—	2–1	1–0	4–1
2	Equatorial Guinea	6	3	0	3	7	7	0	9	Final tournament	0–1	—	1–0	1–0
3	Tanzania	6	2	1	3	5	6	−1	7		1–1	2–1	—	1–0
4	Libya	6	1	0	5	7	15	−8	3		2–5	2–3	2–1	—

Source: CAF

=== Group K ===
Pos	Team	Pld	W	D	L	GF	GA	GD	Pts	Qualification	Côte d'Ivoire	Ethiopia	Madagascar	Niger
1	Ivory Coast	6	4	1	1	11	5	+6	13	Final tournament	—	3–1	2–1	1–0
2	Ethiopia	6	3	0	3	10	6	+4	9	Final tournament	2–1	—	4–0	3–0
3	Madagascar	6	2	2	2	9	9	0	8		1–1	1–0	—	0–0
4	Niger	6	1	1	4	3	13	−10	4		0–3	1–0	2–6	—

Source: CAF

=== Group L ===
Pos	Team	Pld	W	D	L	GF	GA	GD	Pts	Qualification	Nigeria	Sierra Leone	Benin	Lesotho
1	Nigeria	6	4	2	0	14	7	+7	14	Final tournament	—	4–4	2–1	3–0
2	Sierra Leone	6	1	4	1	6	6	0	7	Final tournament	0–0	—	1–0	1–1
3	Benin	6	2	1	3	3	4	−1	7		0–1	1–0	—	1–0
4	Lesotho	6	0	3	3	3	9	−6	3		2–4	0–0	0–0	—

Source: CAF

== Qualified teams ==
The following teams qualified for the final tournament.

Team	Qualified as	Qualified on	Previous appearances in Africa Cup of Nations^{1}
Cameroon	Hosts / Group F winners	8 January 2019	19 (1970, 1972, 1982, **1984**, 1986, **1988**, 1990, 1992, 1996, 1998, **2000**, **2002**, 2004, 2006, 2008, 2010, 2015, **2017**, 2019)
Mali	Group A winners	17 November 2020	11 (1972, 1994, 2002, 2004, 2008, 2010, 2012, 2013, 2015, 2017, 2019)
Guinea	Group A runners-up	24 March 2021	12 (1970, 1974, 1976, 1980, 1994, 1998, 2004, 2006, 2008, 2012, 2015, 2019)
Burkina Faso	Group B winners	24 March 2021	11 (1978, 1996, 1998, 2000, 2002, 2004, 2010, 2012, 2013, 2015, 2017)
Malawi	Group B runners-up	29 March 2021	2 (1984, 2010)
Ghana	Group C winners	25 March 2021	22 (**1963**, **1965**, 1968, 1970, **1978**, 1980, **1982**, 1984, 1992, 1994, 1996, 1998, 2000, 2002, 2006, 2008, 2010, 2012, 2013, 2015, 2017, 2019)
Sudan	Group C runners-up	28 March 2021	8 (1957, 1959, 1963, **1970**, 1972, 1976, 2008, 2012)
Gambia	Group D winners	25 March 2021	debut
Gabon	Group D runners-up	25 March 2021	7 (1994, 1996, 2000, 2010, 2012, 2015, 2017)
Morocco	Group E winners	26 March 2021	17 (1972, **1976**, 1978, 1980, 1986, 1988, 1992, 1998, 2000, 2002, 2004, 2006, 2008, 2012, 2013, 2017, 2019)
Mauritania	Group E runners-up	30 March 2021	1 (2019)
Cape Verde	Group F runners-up	30 March 2021	2 (2013, 2015)
Egypt	Group G winners	25 March 2021	24 (**1957**, **1959**, 1962, 1963, 1970, 1974, 1976, 1980, 1984, **1986**, 1988, 1990, 1992, 1994, 1996, **1998**, 2000, 2002, 2004, **2006**, **2008**, **2010**, 2017, 2019)
Comoros	Group G runners-up	25 March 2021	debut
Algeria	Group H winners	16 November 2020	18 (1968, 1980, 1982, 1984, 1986, 1988, **1990**, 1992, 1996, 1998, 2000, 2002, 2004, 2010, 2013, 2015, 2017, **2019**)
Zimbabwe	Group H runners-up	25 March 2021	4 (2004, 2006, 2017, 2019)
Senegal	Group I winners	15 November 2020	15 (1965, 1968, 1986, 1990, 1992, 1994, 2000, 2002, 2004, 2006, 2008, 2012, 2015, 2017, 2019)
Guinea-Bissau	Group I runners-up	30 March 2021	2 (2017, 2019)
Tunisia	Group J winners	17 November 2020	19 (1962, 1963, 1965, 1978, 1982, 1994, 1996, 1998, 2000, 2002, **2004**, 2006, 2008, 2010, 2012, 2013, 2015, 2017, 2019)
Equatorial Guinea	Group J runners-up	25 March 2021	2 (2012, 2015)
Ivory Coast	Group K winners	26 March 2021	23 (1965, 1968, 1970, 1974, 1980, 1984, 1986, 1988, 1990, **1992**, 1994, 1996, 1998, 2000, 2002, 2006, 2008, 2010, 2012, 2013, **2015**, 2017, 2019)
Ethiopia	Group K runners-up	30 March 2021	10 (1957, 1959, **1962**, 1963, 1965, 1968, 1970, 1976, 1982, 2013)
Nigeria	Group L winners	27 March 2021	18 (1963, 1976, 1978, **1980**, 1982, 1984, 1988, 1990, 1992, **1994**, 2000, 2002, 2004, 2006, 2008, 2010, **2013**, 2019)
Sierra Leone	Group L runners-up	15 June 2021	2 (1994, 1996)

^{1} Bold indicates champions for that year. Italics indicates hosts for that year.

== Goalscorers ==
There were 335 goals scored in 150 matches, for an average of 2.23 goals per match.

5 goals

- (Nigeria) Victor Osimhen
- (Zambia) Patson Daka

4 goals

- (Algeria) Baghdad Bounedjah
- (Burundi) Saidi Ntibazonkiza
- (Central African Republic) Louis Mafouta
- (South Africa) Percy Tau

3 goals

- (Algeria) Riyad Mahrez
- (Cameroon) Vincent Aboubakar
- (Ethiopia) Getaneh Kebede
- (Gabon) Denis Bouanga
- (The Gambia) Assan Ceesay
- (Ghana) Mohammed Kudus
- (Ivory Coast) Franck Kessié
- (Morocco) Hakim Ziyech
- (Nigeria) Alex Iwobi
- (São Tomé and Príncipe) Luís Leal
- (Senegal) Famara Diédhiou
- (Sudan) Mohamed Abdelrahman
- (Tunisia) Seifeddine Jaziri
- (Tunisia) Saîf-Eddine Khaoui
- (Tunisia) Wahbi Khazri

2 goals

- (Algeria) Youcef Belaïli
- (Algeria) Sofiane Feghouli
- (Algeria) Islam Slimani
- (Benin) Jodel Dossou
- (Burkina Faso) Aristide Bancé
- (Burkina Faso) Lassina Traoré
- (Cape Verde) Ryan Mendes
- (Chad) Ezechiel N'Douassel
- (Republic of the Congo) Prince Ibara
- (Republic of the Congo) Junior Makiesse
- (Egypt) Afsha
- (Egypt) Mohamed Salah
- (Egypt) Mohamed Sherif
- (Equatorial Guinea) Pedro Obiang
- (Ethiopia) Shimelis Bekele
- (Ethiopia) Amanuel Gebremichael
- (Gabon) Pierre-Emerick Aubameyang
- (Gabon) Aaron Boupendza
- (The Gambia) Bubacarr Jobe
- (Ghana) André Ayew
- (Ghana) Jordan Ayew
- (Guinea) Naby Keïta
- (Guinea-Bissau) Jorginho
- (Guinea-Bissau) Piqueti
- (Ivory Coast) Serge Aurier
- (Libya) Sanad Al Warfali
- (Libya) Muaid Ellafi
- (Madagascar) Lalaïna Nomenjanahary
- (Madagascar) Paulin Voavy
- (Malawi) Richard Mbulu
- (Morocco) Youssef En-Nesyri
- (Morocco) Achraf Hakimi
- (Mozambique) Telinho
- (Namibia) Peter Shalulile
- (Nigeria) Samuel Chukwueze
- (Nigeria) Paul Onuachu
- (Senegal) Sadio Mané
- (Sierra Leone) Alhaji Kamara
- (Sierra Leone) Kwame Quee
- (South Africa) Themba Zwane
- (South Sudan) Joseph Kuch
- (Sudan) Seif Teiri
- (Tanzania) Simon Msuva
- (Zimbabwe) Khama Billiat

1 goal

- (Algeria) Ramy Bensebaini
- (Algeria) Farid Boulaya
- (Algeria) Andy Delort
- (Algeria) Rachid Ghezzal
- (Algeria) Aïssa Mandi
- (Algeria) Hillal Soudani
- (Angola) Loide Augusto
- (Angola) Wilson Eduardo
- (Angola) Show
- (Angola) Yano
- (Benin) Stéphane Sessègnon
- (Botswana) Mosha Gaolaolwe
- (Botswana) Tumisang Orebonye
- (Burkina Faso) Bryan Dabo
- (Burkina Faso) Bertrand Traoré
- (Burundi) Youssouf Ndayishimiye
- (Burundi) Christophe Nduwarugira
- (Cameroon) Pierre Kunde
- (Cameroon) Clinton N'Jie
- (Cameroon) Moumi Ngamaleu
- (Cameroon) Serge Tabekou
- (Cameroon) André-Frank Zambo Anguissa
- (Cape Verde) Kuca
- (Cape Verde) Garry Rodrigues
- (Central African Republic) Vianney Mabidé
- (Chad) Ahmat Abdaraman
- (Comoros) El Fardou Ben Nabouhane
- (Comoros) Faiz Mattoir
- (Comoros) Youssouf M'Changama
- (Comoros) Faïz Selemani
- (Republic of the Congo) Silvère Ganvoula
- (Democratic Republic of the Congo) Cédric Bakambu
- (Democratic Republic of the Congo) Kazadi Kasengu
- (Democratic Republic of the Congo) Neeskens Kebano
- (Democratic Republic of the Congo) Jackson Muleka
- (Djibouti) Mahdi Houssein Mahabeh
- (Egypt) Mahmoud Hamdy
- (Egypt) Mahmoud Kahraba
- (Egypt) Mohamed El Neny
- (Egypt) Trézéguet
- (Equatorial Guinea) Josete Miranda
- (Equatorial Guinea) Emilio Nsue
- (Equatorial Guinea) Salomón Obama
- (Equatorial Guinea) Iban Salvador
- (Eswatini) Felix Badenhorst
- (Eswatini) Sabelo Gamedze
- (Eswatini) Fganelo Mamba
- (Ethiopia) Surafel Dagnachew
- (Ethiopia) Mohamed Mesud
- (Ethiopia) Abubeker Nassir
- (Gabon) Bruno Ecuele Manga
- (The Gambia) Modou Barrow
- (The Gambia) Musa Barrow
- (The Gambia) Mamadou Danso
- (The Gambia) Ablie Jallow
- (The Gambia) Sulayman Marreh
- (The Gambia) Bubacarr Sanneh
- (Ghana) Nicholas Opoku
- (Ghana) Thomas Partey
- (Ghana) Baba Rahman
- (Guinea) Mady Camara
- (Guinea) Sékou Condé
- (Guinea) Mamadou Kane
- (Guinea) José Kanté
- (Guinea) Seydouba Soumah
- (Guinea) Issiaga Sylla
- (Guinea-Bissau) Marcelo Djaló
- (Guinea-Bissau) João Mário
- (Guinea-Bissau) Frédéric Mendy
- (Guinea-Bissau) Pelé
- (Guinea-Bissau) Alfa Semedo
- (Ivory Coast) Willy Boly
- (Ivory Coast) Gervinho
- (Ivory Coast) Max Gradel
- (Ivory Coast) Sébastien Haller
- (Ivory Coast) Wilfried Kanon
- (Ivory Coast) Jean Evrard Kouassi
- (Kenya) Masoud Juma
- (Kenya) Cliff Nyakeya
- (Kenya) Michael Olunga
- (Kenya) Johanna Omolo
- (Lesotho) Masoabi Nkoto
- (Lesotho) Jane Thabantso
- (Liberia) Kpah Sherman
- (Libya) Mohamed Bettamer
- (Libya) Hamdou Elhouni
- (Libya) Anis Saltou
- (Madagascar) Anicet Abel
- (Madagascar) Ibrahim Amada
- (Madagascar) Carolus Andriamatsinoro
- (Madagascar) Jeremy Morel
- (Madagascar) Rayan Raveloson
- (Malawi) Gabadinho Mhango
- (Malawi) Gerald Phiri
- (Mali) Mohamed Camara
- (Mali) Moussa Djenepo
- (Mali) Moussa Doumbia
- (Mali) Sékou Koïta
- (Mali) Adama Traoré
- (Mali) El Bilal Touré
- (Mauritania) Diallo Guidileye
- (Mauritania) Hacen
- (Mauritania) Aboubakar Kamara
- (Mauritania) Bakary N'Diaye
- (Mauritania) Mamadou Niass
- (Mauritius) Ashley Nazira
- (Mauritius) Kevin Perticots
- (Morocco) Zakaria Aboukhlal
- (Morocco) Noussair Mazraoui
- (Morocco) Munir
- (Mozambique) Kamo-Kamo
- (Mozambique) Mexer
- (Mozambique) Witi
- (Namibia) Elmo Kambindu
- (Namibia) Chris Katjiukua
- (Niger) Yussif Moussa
- (Niger) Youssef Oumarou
- (Niger) Amadou Wonkoye
- (Nigeria) Peter Etebo
- (Nigeria) Samuel Kalu
- (Rwanda) Lague Byiringiro
- (São Tomé and Príncipe) Marcos Barbeiro
- (São Tomé and Príncipe) Harramiz
- (São Tomé and Príncipe) Iniesta
- (São Tomé and Príncipe) Jocy
- (São Tomé and Príncipe) Ludgério Silva
- (Senegal) Habib Diallo
- (Senegal) Cheikhou Kouyaté
- (Senegal) Badou Ndiaye
- (Senegal) Opa Nguette
- (Senegal) Sidy Sarr
- (Seychelles) Nigel Hoareau
- (Sierra Leone) Mustapha Bundu
- (Sierra Leone) Kei Kamara
- (South Africa) Lebogang Phiri
- (South Africa) Bongani Zungu
- (South Sudan) Tito Okello
- (South Sudan) Stephen Pawaar
- (South Sudan) Koang Thok
- (Sudan) Ramadan Agab
- (Sudan) Mohamed El-Rasheed
- (Sudan) Ahmed Hamid
- (Sudan) Seifeldin Malik
- (Tanzania) Salum Abubakar
- (Tanzania) Feisal Salum
- (Tanzania) Mbwana Samatta
- (Togo) Elom Nya-Vedji
- (Togo) Hakim Ouro-Sama
- (Tunisia) Mohamed Dräger
- (Tunisia) Youssef Msakni
- (Tunisia) Ellyes Skhiri
- (Tunisia) Anis Ben Slimane
- (Uganda) Fahad Bayo
- (Uganda) Halid Lwaliwa
- (Uganda) Emmanuel Okwi
- (Zambia) Clatous Chama
- (Zambia) Enock Mwepu
- (Zambia) Collins Sikombe
- (Zimbabwe) Perfect Chikwende
- (Zimbabwe) Prince Dube
- (Zimbabwe) Tinotenda Kadewere
- (Zimbabwe) Knowledge Musona

1 own goal

- (Cameroon) Macky Bagnack (against Cape Verde)
- (Chad) Mathieu Adoassou (against Namibia)
- (Equatorial Guinea) Carlos Akapo (against Tunisia)
- (The Gambia) Mohammed Mbye (against Djibouti)
- (Guinea) Issiaga Sylla (against Mali)
- (Mozambique) Faisal Bangal (against Cape Verde)
- (Nigeria) Chidozie Awaziem (against Lesotho)
- (São Tomé and Príncipe) Jordão Diogo (against Sudan)
- (Tunisia) Firas Chaouat (against Equatorial Guinea)
