= Sierra Leone national football team results (2020–present) =

This page details the match results and statistics of the Sierra Leone national football team from 2020 to present.

== Results ==
Sierra Leone's score is shown first in each case.

Date	Venue	Opponents	Score	Competition	Sierra Leone scorers	Att.	Ref.
9 October 2020	Stade Cheikha Ould Boïdiya, Nouakchott (A)	Mauritania	1–2	Friendly	Koroma 30'	0 (Note: Match held behind closed doors due to the COVID-19 pandemic.)	
13 October 2020	Stade General Seyni Kountche, Niamey (A)	Niger	0–1	Friendly	—		
13 November 2020	Samuel Ogbemudia Stadium, Benin City (A)	Nigeria	4–4	2021 Africa Cup of Nations qualification	Quee 41', Kamara 72', 86', Bundu 80'	0	
17 November 2020	National Stadium, Freetown (H)	Nigeria	0–0	2021 Africa Cup of Nations qualification	—		
27 March 2021	Setsoto Stadium, Maseru (A)	Lesotho	0–0	2021 Africa Cup of Nations qualification	—		
