= 2021 Africa Cup of Nations qualification Group L =

Football tournament qualifying stage

Group L of the 2021 Africa Cup of Nations qualification tournament was one of the twelve groups that decided the teams which qualified for the 2021 Africa Cup of Nations finals tournament. The group consisted of four teams: Nigeria, Benin, Sierra Leone, and Lesotho.

The teams played against each other in home-and-away round-robin format, originally scheduled between November 2019 and September 2020.

Due to the COVID-19 pandemic, all matches of matchdays 3 and 4 scheduled for March 2020 were postponed until further notice. FIFA recommended that all June 2020 international matches (matchday 5) be postponed, and also postponed the September 2020 window (matchday 6) for CAF.

On 30 June 2020, the CAF announced the 2021 Africa Cup of Nations final tournament had been postponed from January 2021 to January 2022, without announcing the new dates of the remaining qualifiers. On 19 August 2020, the CAF announced the new dates of the remaining qualifiers, with matchdays 3 and 4 rescheduled to be played between 9–17 November 2020, and matchdays 5 and 6 rescheduled to be played between 22 and 30 March 2021.

Nigeria and Sierra Leone, the group winners and runners-up respectively, qualified for the 2021 Africa Cup of Nations.

== Standings ==
Pos	Team	Pld	W	D	L	GF	GA	GD	Pts	Qualification	Nigeria	Sierra Leone	Benin	Lesotho
1	Nigeria	6	4	2	0	14	7	+7	14	Final tournament	—	4–4	2–1	3–0
2	Sierra Leone	6	1	4	1	6	6	0	7	Final tournament	0–0	—	1–0	1–1
3	Benin	6	2	1	3	3	4	−1	7		0–1	1–0	—	1–0
4	Lesotho	6	0	3	3	3	9	−6	3		2–4	0–0	0–0	—

Source: CAF
Rules for classification: Tiebreakers

== Matches ==
13 November 2019
16:00 UTC+0

Sierra Leone	1–1	Lesotho
Quee 72'	Report	Thabantso 90'

National Stadium, Freetown
Attendance: 0 (Note: Sierra Leone played their home match against Lesotho without spectators because of an incident from the 2022 FIFA World Cup qualification encounter between Sierra Leone and Liberia.)
Referee: Jean Ouattara (Burkina Faso)
13 November 2019
17:00 UTC+1

Nigeria	2–1	Benin
Osimhen 45+1' (pen.); Kalu 62'	Report	Sessègnon 3'

Godswill Akpabio International Stadium, Uyo
Referee: Issa Sy (Senegal)

17 November 2019
14:00 UTC+1

Benin	1–0	Sierra Leone
Dossou 28'	Report

Stade Charles de Gaulle, Porto-Novo
Referee: Jean-Marc Ganamandji (Central African Republic)
17 November 2019
18:00 UTC+2

Lesotho	2–4	Nigeria
Nkoto 11'; Awaziem 90' (o.g.)	Report	Iwobi 26'; Chukwueze 38'; Osimhen 75', 85'

Setsoto Stadium, Maseru
Referee: Joshua Bondo (Botswana)

13 November 2020
17:00 UTC+1

Nigeria	4–4	Sierra Leone
Iwobi 4', 27'; Osimhen 21'; Chukwueze 29'	Report	Quee 41'; A. Kamara 72', 86'; Bundu 80'

Samuel Ogbemudia Stadium, Benin City
Referee: Gilbert Cheruiyot (Kenya)
14 November 2020
17:00 UTC+1

Benin	1–0	Lesotho
Dossou 24'	Report

Stade Charles de Gaulle, Porto-Novo
Referee: Janny Sikazwe (Zambia)

17 November 2020
16:00 UTC+0

Sierra Leone	0–0	Nigeria
	Report

National Stadium, Freetown
Referee: Mehdi Abid Charef (Algeria)
17 November 2020
18:00 UTC+2

Lesotho	0–0	Benin
	Report

Setsoto Stadium, Maseru
Referee: Chelangat Ali Sabilla (Uganda)

27 March 2021
15:00 UTC+2

Lesotho	0–0	Sierra Leone
	Report

Setsoto Stadium, Maseru
Referee: Andofetra Rakotojaona (Madagascar)
27 March 2021
17:00 UTC+1

Benin	0–1	Nigeria
	Report	Onuachu 90+3'

Stade Charles de Gaulle, Porto-Novo
Referee: Redouane Jiyed (Morocco)

30 March 2021
17:00 UTC+1

Nigeria	3–0	Lesotho
Osimhen 23'; Etebo 50'; Onuachu 83'	Report

Teslim Balogun Stadium, Lagos
Referee: Fabricio Duarte (Cape Verde)
15 June 2021 (Note: The Sierra Leone vs Benin match was originally scheduled for 30 March 2021, but was called off after Benin refused to play in protest of several of their players allegedly returning positive COVID-19 tests shortly before kickoff. The following day, the CAF Organising Committee for the Africa Cup of Nations decided to postpone the match to the next FIFA international window in June. The match was then scheduled for 14 June and finally rescheduled again for 15 June.)
16:00 UTC+0

Sierra Leone	1–0	Benin
K. Kamara 19' (pen.)	Report

Stade du 28 Septembre, Conakry (Guinea)
Referee: Haythem Guirat (Tunisia)

== Goalscorers ==
There were 26 goals scored in 12 matches, for an average of 2.17 goals per match.

5 goals

- (Nigeria) Victor Osimhen

3 goals

- (Nigeria) Alex Iwobi

2 goals

- (Benin) Jodel Dossou
- (Nigeria) Samuel Chukwueze
- (Nigeria) Paul Onuachu
- (Sierra Leone) Alhaji Kamara
- (Sierra Leone) Kwame Quee

1 goal

- (Benin) Stéphane Sessègnon
- (Lesotho) Masoabi Nkoto
- (Lesotho) Jane Thabantso
- (Nigeria) Peter Etebo
- (Nigeria) Samuel Kalu
- (Sierra Leone) Mustapha Bundu
- (Sierra Leone) Kei Kamara

1 own goal

- (Nigeria) Chidozie Awaziem (against Lesotho)
