= 2021 Africa Cup of Nations qualification Group B =

Football tournament qualifying stage

Group B of the 2021 Africa Cup of Nations qualification tournament was one of the twelve groups that decided the teams which qualified for the 2021 Africa Cup of Nations finals tournament. The group consisted of four teams: Burkina Faso, Uganda, Malawi, and South Sudan (winners of the preliminary round).

The teams played against each other in home-and-away round-robin format, originally scheduled between November 2019 and September 2020.

Due to the COVID-19 pandemic, all matches of matchdays 3 and 4 scheduled for March 2020 were postponed until further notice. FIFA recommended that all June 2020 international matches (matchday 5) be postponed, and also postponed the September 2020 window (matchday 6) for CAF.

On 30 June 2020, the CAF announced the 2021 Africa Cup of Nations final tournament had been postponed from January 2021 to January 2022, without announcing the new dates of the remaining qualifiers. On 19 August 2020, the CAF announced the new dates of the remaining qualifiers, with matchdays 3 and 4 rescheduled to be played between 9–17 November 2020, and matchdays 5 and 6 rescheduled to be played between 22 and 30 March 2021.

Burkina Faso and Malawi, the group winners and runners-up respectively, qualified for the 2021 Africa Cup of Nations.

== Standings ==
Pos	Team	Pld	W	D	L	GF	GA	GD	Pts	Qualification	Burkina Faso	Malawi	Uganda	South Sudan
1	Burkina Faso	6	3	3	0	6	2	+4	12	Final tournament	—	3–1	0–0	1–0
2	Malawi	6	3	1	2	4	5	−1	10	Final tournament	0–0	—	1–0	1–0
3	Uganda	6	2	2	2	3	2	+1	8		0–0	2–0	—	1–0
4	South Sudan	6	1	0	5	2	6	−4	3		1–2	0–1	1–0	—

Source: CAF
Rules for classification: Tiebreakers

== Matches ==
13 November 2019
15:00 UTC+2

Malawi	1–0	South Sudan
Mhango 68'	Report

Kamuzu Stadium, Blantyre
Referee: Pacifique Ndabihawenimana (Burundi)
13 November 2019
19:00 UTC+0

Burkina Faso	0–0	Uganda
	Report

Stade du 4 Août, Ouagadougou
Referee: Nabil Boukhalfa (Algeria)

17 November 2019
15:00 UTC+2

South Sudan	1–2	Burkina Faso
Kuch 90'	Report	Bancé 20', 40'

Khartoum Stadium, Khartoum (Sudan) (Note: South Sudan will play their home matches outside the country due to renovation of Juba Stadium.)
Referee: Tsegay Teklu Mogos (Eritrea)
17 November 2019
16:00 UTC+3

Uganda	2–0	Malawi
Okwi 29'; Bayo 68'	Report

Mandela National Stadium, Kira
Referee: Mahmood Ali Mahmood Ismail (Sudan)

12 November 2020
16:00 UTC+3

Uganda	1–0	South Sudan
Lwaliwa 86'	Report

St. Mary's Stadium-Kitende, Entebbe
Referee: Messie Nkounkou (DR Congo)
12 November 2020
19:00 UTC+0

Burkina Faso	3–1	Malawi
L. Traoré 2', 25'; Dabo 90'	Report	Phiri Jr. 81' (pen.)

Stade du 4 Août, Ouagadougou
Referee: Dahane Beida (Mauritania)

16 November 2020
15:00 UTC+2

Malawi	0–0	Burkina Faso
	Report

Kamuzu Stadium, Blantyre
Referee: Souleiman Ahmed Djamal (Djibouti)
16 November 2020
16:00 UTC+3

South Sudan	1–0	Uganda
Okello 35' (pen.)	Report

Nyayo National Stadium, Nairobi (Kenya)
Referee: Louis Houngnandande (Benin)

24 March 2021
16:00 UTC+3

Uganda	0–0	Burkina Faso
	Report

St. Mary's Stadium-Kitende, Entebbe
Referee: Bakary Gassama (Gambia)
24 March 2021
16:00 UTC+3

South Sudan	0–1	Malawi
	Report	Phiri Jr. 47'

Al-Hilal Stadium, Omdurman (Sudan)
Referee: Anthony Ogwayo (Kenya)

29 March 2021
15:00 UTC+2

Malawi	1–0	Uganda
Mbulu 15'	Report

Bingu National Stadium, Lilongwe
Referee: Celso Alvação (Mozambique)
29 March 2021
16:00 UTC+0

Burkina Faso	1–0	South Sudan
B. Traoré 49'	Report

Stade du 4 Août, Ouagadougou
Referee: George Rogers (Liberia)

== Goalscorers ==
There were 15 goals scored in 12 matches, for an average of 1.25 goals per match.

2 goals

- (Burkina Faso) Aristide Bancé
- (Burkina Faso) Lassina Traoré
- (Malawi) Richard Mbulu

1 goal

- (Burkina Faso) Bryan Dabo
- (Burkina Faso) Bertrand Traoré
- (Malawi) Gabadinho Mhango
- (Malawi) Gerald Phiri
- (South Sudan) Tito Okello
- (South Sudan) Stephen Pawaar
- (Uganda) Fahad Bayo
- (Uganda) Halid Lwaliwa
- (Uganda) Emmanuel Okwi
