= 2021 Africa Cup of Nations qualification Group E =

Group E of the 2021 Africa Cup of Nations qualification tournament was one of the twelve groups that decided the teams which qualified for the 2021 Africa Cup of Nations finals tournament. The group consisted of four teams: Morocco, Mauritania, the Central African Republic, and Burundi.

The teams played against each other in home-and-away round-robin format, originally scheduled between November 2019 and September 2020.

Due to the COVID-19 pandemic, all matches of matchdays 3 and 4 scheduled for March 2020 were postponed until further notice. FIFA recommended that all June 2020 international matches (matchday 5) be postponed, and also postponed the September 2020 window (matchday 6) for CAF.

On 30 June 2020, the CAF announced the 2021 Africa Cup of Nations final tournament had been postponed from January 2021 to January 2022, without announcing the new dates of the remaining qualifiers. On 19 August 2020, the CAF announced the new dates of the remaining qualifiers, with matchdays 3 and 4 rescheduled to be played between 9–17 November 2020, and matchdays 5 and 6 rescheduled to be played between 22 and 30 March 2021.

Morocco and Mauritania, the group winners and runners-up respectively, qualified for the 2021 Africa Cup of Nations.

== Standings ==
Pos	Team	Pld	W	D	L	GF	GA	GD	Pts	Qualification	Morocco	Mauritania	Burundi	Central African Republic
1	Morocco	6	4	2	0	10	1	+9	14	Final tournament	—	0–0	1–0	4–1
2	Mauritania	6	2	3	1	5	4	+1	9	Final tournament	0–0	—	1–1	2–0
3	Burundi	6	1	2	3	6	10	−4	5		0–3	3–1	—	2–2
4	Central African Republic	6	1	1	4	5	11	−6	4		0–2	0–1	2–0	—

Source: CAF
Rules for classification: Tiebreakers

== Matches ==
13 November 2019
14:00 UTC+1

Central African Republic	2–0	Burundi
Mabidé 5'; Mafouta 90+2'	Report

Barthélemy Boganda Stadium, Bangui
Referee: Anthony Ogwayo (Kenya)
15 November 2019
20:00 UTC+1

Morocco	0–0	Mauritania
	Report

Prince Moulay Abdellah Stadium, Rabat
Referee: Louis Hakizimana (Rwanda)

19 November 2019
15:00 UTC+2

Burundi	0–3	Morocco
	Report	Mazraoui 27'; En-Nesyri 40'; Hakimi 83'

Intwari Stadium, Bujumbura
Referee: Maguette N'Diaye (Senegal)
19 November 2019
16:00 UTC+0

Mauritania	2–0	Central African Republic
Hacen 27'; Guidileye 90+1'	Report

Stade Cheikha Ould Boïdiya, Nouakchott
Referee: Sadok Selmi (Tunisia)

11 November 2020
16:00 UTC+0

Mauritania	1–1	Burundi
N'Diaye 30'	Report	Ntibazonkiza 79'

Stade Cheikha Ould Boïdiya, Nouakchott
Referee: Alhadi Allaou Mahamat (Chad)
13 November 2020
20:00 UTC+1

Morocco	4–1	Central African Republic
Hakimi 10'; Ziyech 31' (pen.), 34'; Aboukhlal 64'	Report	Mafouta 25'

Stade Mohammed V, Casablanca
Referee: Boubou Traoré (Mali)

15 November 2020
15:00 UTC+2

Burundi	3–1	Mauritania
Ntibazonkiza 6', 55'; Ndayishimiye 46'	Report	Niass 27'

Intwari Stadium, Bujumbura
Referee: David Molise (Lesotho)
17 November 2020
17:00 UTC+1

Central African Republic	0–2	Morocco
	Report	Ziyech 39'; En-Nesyri 90+1'

Stade de la Réunification, Douala (Cameroon) (Note: Central African Republic played home game in Cameroon due to their home stadium, Barthélemy Boganda Stadium, did not meet CAF standard.)
Referee: Eric Otogo-Castane (Gabon)

26 March 2021
15:00 UTC+2

Burundi	2–2	Central African Republic
Ntibazonkiza 59'; Nduwarugira 80'	Report	Mafouta 40', 53'

Intwari Stadium, Bujumbura
Referee: Abdulwahid Huraywidah (Libya)
26 March 2021
19:00 UTC+0

Mauritania	0–0	Morocco
	Report

Stade Cheikha Ould Boïdiya, Nouakchott
Referee: Joshua Bondo (Botswana)

30 March 2021
20:00 UTC+1

Central African Republic	0–1	Mauritania
	Report	Kamara 45+4'

Barthélemy Boganda Stadium, Bangui
Referee: Alhadi Allaou Mahamat (Chad)
30 March 2021
20:00 UTC+1

Morocco	1–0	Burundi
Munir 45'	Report

Prince Moulay Abdellah Stadium, Rabat
Referee: Blaise Yuven Ngwa (Cameroon)

== Goalscorers ==
There were 26 goals scored in 12 matches, for an average of 2.17 goals per match.

4 goals

- (Burundi) Saidi Ntibazonkiza
- (Central African Republic) Louis Mafouta

3 goals

- (Morocco) Hakim Ziyech

2 goals

- (Morocco) Youssef En-Nesyri
- (Morocco) Achraf Hakimi

1 goal

- (Burundi) Youssouf Ndayishimiye
- (Burundi) Christophe Nduwarugira
- (Central African Republic) Vianney Mabidé
- (Mauritania) Diallo Guidileye
- (Mauritania) Hacen
- (Mauritania) Aboubakar Kamara
- (Mauritania) Bakary N'Diaye
- (Mauritania) Mamadou Niass
- (Morocco) Zakaria Aboukhlal
- (Morocco) Noussair Mazraoui
- (Morocco) Munir
