= 2021 Africa Cup of Nations qualification Group H =

Football tournament qualifying stage

Group H of the 2021 Africa Cup of Nations qualification tournament was one of the twelve groups that decided the teams which qualified for the 2021 Africa Cup of Nations finals tournament. The group consisted of four teams: Algeria, Zambia, Zimbabwe, and Botswana (winners of the preliminary round).

The teams played against each other in home-and-away round-robin format, originally scheduled between November 2019 and September 2020.

Due to the COVID-19 pandemic, all matches of matchdays 3 and 4 scheduled for March 2020 were postponed until further notice. FIFA recommended that all June 2020 international matches (matchday 5) be postponed, and also postponed the September 2020 window (matchday 6) for CAF.

On 30 June 2020, the CAF announced the 2021 Africa Cup of Nations final tournament had been postponed from January 2021 to January 2022, without announcing the new dates of the remaining qualifiers. On 19 August 2020, the CAF announced the new dates of the remaining qualifiers, with matchdays 3 and 4 rescheduled to be played between 9–17 November 2020, and matchdays 5 and 6 rescheduled to be played between 22 and 30 March 2021.

Algeria and Zimbabwe, the group winners and runners-up respectively, qualified for the 2021 Africa Cup of Nations.

== Standings ==
Pos	Team	Pld	W	D	L	GF	GA	GD	Pts	Qualification	Algeria	Zimbabwe	Zambia	Botswana
1	Algeria	6	4	2	0	19	6	+13	14	Final tournament	—	3–1	5–0	5–0
2	Zimbabwe	6	2	2	2	6	8	−2	8	Final tournament	2–2	—	0–2	0–0
3	Zambia	6	2	1	3	8	12	−4	7		3–3	1–2	—	2–1
4	Botswana	6	1	1	4	2	9	−7	4		0–1	0–1	1–0	—

Source: CAF
Rules for classification: Tiebreakers

== Matches ==
14 November 2019
20:00 UTC+1

Algeria	5–0	Zambia
Bensebaini 44'; Bounedjah 68' (pen.), 90'; Belaïli 75'; Soudani 86'	Report

Mustapha Tchaker Stadium, Blida
Referee: Bamlak Tessema Weyesa (Ethiopia)
15 November 2019
18:00 UTC+2

Zimbabwe	0–0	Botswana
	Report

National Sports Stadium, Harare
Referee: Thierry Nkurunziza (Burundi)

18 November 2019
21:00 UTC+2

Botswana	0–1	Algeria
	Report	Belaïli 15'

National Stadium, Gaborone
Referee: Ali Sabilla (Uganda)
19 November 2019
18:00 UTC+2

Zambia	1–2	Zimbabwe
Daka 20'	Report	Billiat 11', 79'

National Heroes Stadium, Lusaka
Referee: Mahamadou Keita (Mali)

12 November 2020
18:00 UTC+2

Zambia	2–1	Botswana
Mwepu 45+1'; Sikombe 66'	Report	Orebonye 45'

National Heroes Stadium, Lusaka
Referee: Jean-Jacques Ngambo (DR Congo)
12 November 2020
20:00 UTC+1

Algeria	3–1	Zimbabwe
Bounedjah 31'; Feghouli 43'; Mahrez 67'	Report	Kadewere 79'

Stade 5 Juillet 1962, Algiers
Referee: Sidi Alioum (Cameroon)

16 November 2020
15:00 UTC+2

Zimbabwe	2–2	Algeria
Musona 43'; Dube 82'	Report	Delort 34'; Mahrez 38'

National Sports Stadium, Harare
Referee: Mahmood Ali Mahmood (Sudan)
16 November 2020
18:00 UTC+2

Botswana	1–0	Zambia
Gaolaolwe 6'	Report

Francistown Stadium, Francistown
Referee: Ishmael Chizinga (Malawi)

25 March 2021
18:00 UTC+2

Botswana	0–1	Zimbabwe
	Report	Chikwende 14'

Francistown Stadium, Francistown
Referee: Georges Gatogato (Burundi)
25 March 2021
21:00 UTC+2

Zambia	3–3	Algeria
Daka 34' (pen.), 80' (pen.); C. Chama 52'	Report	Ghezzal 19'; Slimani 25', 55'

National Heroes Stadium, Lusaka
Referee: Ali Mohamed Adelaid (Comoros)

29 March 2021
20:00 UTC+1

Algeria	5–0	Botswana
Mandi 24'; Feghouli 58'; Mahrez 64' (pen.); Bounedjah 72'; Boulaya 88'	Report

Mustapha Tchaker Stadium, Blida
Referee: Jean Ouattara (Burkina Faso)
29 March 2021
21:00 UTC+2

Zimbabwe	0–2	Zambia
	Report	Daka 21', 90+2'

National Sports Stadium, Harare
Referee: Molise Retselisitsoe (Lesotho)

== Goalscorers ==
There were 35 goals scored in 12 matches, for an average of 2.92 goals per match.

5 goals

- (Zambia) Patson Daka

4 goals

- (Algeria) Baghdad Bounedjah

3 goals

- (Algeria) Riyad Mahrez

2 goals

- (Algeria) Youcef Belaïli
- (Algeria) Sofiane Feghouli
- (Algeria) Islam Slimani
- (Zimbabwe) Khama Billiat

1 goal

- (Algeria) Ramy Bensebaini
- (Algeria) Farid Boulaya
- (Algeria) Andy Delort
- (Algeria) Rachid Ghezzal
- (Algeria) Aïssa Mandi
- (Algeria) Hillal Soudani
- (Botswana) Mosha Gaolaolwe
- (Botswana) Tumisang Orebonye
- (Zambia) Clatous Chama
- (Zambia) Enock Mwepu
- (Zambia) Collins Sikombe
- (Zimbabwe) Perfect Chikwende
- (Zimbabwe) Prince Dube
- (Zimbabwe) Tinotenda Kadewere
- (Zimbabwe) Knowledge Musona
