= 2021 Africa Cup of Nations qualification Group J =

Football tournament qualifying stage

Group J of the 2021 Africa Cup of Nations qualification tournament was one of the twelve groups that decided the teams which qualified for the 2021 Africa Cup of Nations finals tournament. The group consisted of four teams: Tunisia, Libya, Tanzania, and Equatorial Guinea.

The teams played against each other in home-and-away round-robin format, originally scheduled between November 2019 and September 2020.

Due to the COVID-19 pandemic, all matches of matchdays 3 and 4 scheduled for March 2020 were postponed until further notice. FIFA recommended that all June 2020 international matches (matchday 5) be postponed, and also postponed the September 2020 window (matchday 6) for CAF.

On 30 June 2020, the CAF announced the 2021 Africa Cup of Nations final tournament had been postponed from January 2021 to January 2022, without announcing the new dates of the remaining qualifiers. On 19 August 2020, the CAF announced the new dates of the remaining qualifiers, with matchdays 3 and 4 rescheduled to be played between 9–17 November 2020, and matchdays 5 and 6 rescheduled to be played between 22 and 30 March 2021.

Tunisia and Equatorial Guinea, the group winners and runners-up respectively, qualified for the 2021 Africa Cup of Nations.

== Standings ==
Pos	Team	Pld	W	D	L	GF	GA	GD	Pts	Qualification	Tunisia	Equatorial Guinea	Tanzania	Libya
1	Tunisia	6	5	1	0	14	5	+9	16	Final tournament	—	2–1	1–0	4–1
2	Equatorial Guinea	6	3	0	3	7	7	0	9	Final tournament	0–1	—	1–0	1–0
3	Tanzania	6	2	1	3	5	6	−1	7		1–1	2–1	—	1–0
4	Libya	6	1	0	5	7	15	−8	3		2–5	2–3	2–1	—

Source: CAF
Rules for classification: Tiebreakers

== Matches ==
15 November 2019
19:00 UTC+3

Tanzania	2–1	Equatorial Guinea
Msuva 69'; Abubakar 90+2'	Report	Obiang 15'

National Stadium, Dar es Salaam
Referee: Imtehaz Heeralall (Mauritius)
15 November 2019
20:00 UTC+1

Tunisia	4–1	Libya
Khazri 33', 90'; Khaoui 41', 52'	Report	Elhouni 45+1'

Stade Olympique de Radès, Tunis
Referee: Mahmoud El Banna (Egypt)

19 November 2019
20:00 UTC+1

Equatorial Guinea	0–1	Tunisia
	Report	Khazri 74'

Estadio de Malabo, Malabo
Referee: Mohamed Athoumani (Comoros)
19 November 2019
20:00 UTC+1

Libya	2–1	Tanzania
Al Warfali 68' (pen.); Saltou 81'	Report	Samatta 18' (pen.)

Stade Mustapha Ben Jannet, Monastir (Tunisia) (Note: Libya will play their home matches outside Libya due to security concerns from the ongoing civil war.)
Referee: Ishmael Chizinga (Malawi)

11 November 2020
21:00 UTC+2

Libya	2–3	Equatorial Guinea
Al Warfali 55' (pen.); Bettamer 58'	Report	Josete 33'; Obiang 90+1'; Obama 90+4'

Al Salam Stadium, Cairo (Egypt)
Referee: Bakary Gassama (Gambia)
13 November 2020
20:00 UTC+1

Tunisia	1–0	Tanzania
Msakni 18' (pen.)	Report

Stade Hammadi Agrebi, Tunis
Referee: Helder Martins de Carvalho (Angola)

15 November 2020
20:00 UTC+1

Equatorial Guinea	1–0	Libya
Salvador 27'	Report

Estadio de Malabo, Malabo
Referee: Norman Matemera (Zimbabwe)
17 November 2020
22:00 UTC+3

Tanzania	1–1	Tunisia
Salum 48'	Report	Khaoui 11'

National Stadium, Dar es Salaam
Referee: Celso Alvação (Mozambique)

25 March 2021
21:00 UTC+2

Libya	2–5	Tunisia
Ellafi 21', 54'	Report	Skhiri 39'; Jaziri 48', 90+3'; Dräger 51'; Ben Slimane 84'

Martyrs of February Stadium, Benghazi
Referee: Daouda Guèye (Senegal)
25 March 2021
20:00 UTC+1

Equatorial Guinea	1–0	Tanzania
Nsue 90'	Report

Estadio de Malabo, Malabo
Referee: Bernard Camille (Seychelles)

28 March 2021
14:00 UTC+1

Tunisia	2–1	Equatorial Guinea
Jaziri 4'; Akapo 52' (o.g.)	Report	Chaouat 88' (o.g.)

Stade Hammadi Agrebi, Tunis
Referee: Jean-Jacques Ndala (Congo DR)
28 March 2021
16:00 UTC+3

Tanzania	1–0	Libya
Msuva 45+2'	Report

National Stadium, Dar es Salaam
Referee: Hassan Mohamed Hagi (Somalia)

== Goalscorers ==
There were 33 goals scored in 12 matches, for an average of 2.75 goals per match.

3 goals

- (Tunisia) Seifeddine Jaziri
- (Tunisia) Saîf-Eddine Khaoui
- (Tunisia) Wahbi Khazri

2 goals

- (Equatorial Guinea) Pedro Obiang
- (Libya) Sanad Al Warfali
- (Libya) Muaid Ellafi
- (Tanzania) Simon Msuva

1 goal

- (Equatorial Guinea) Josete Miranda
- (Equatorial Guinea) Emilio Nsue
- (Equatorial Guinea) Salomón Obama
- (Equatorial Guinea) Iban Salvador
- (Libya) Mohamed Bettamer
- (Libya) Hamdou Elhouni
- (Libya) Anis Saltou
- (Tanzania) Salum Abubakar
- (Tanzania) Feisal Salum
- (Tanzania) Mbwana Samatta
- (Tunisia) Mohamed Dräger
- (Tunisia) Youssef Msakni
- (Tunisia) Ellyes Skhiri
- (Tunisia) Anis Ben Slimane

1 own goal

- (Equatorial Guinea) Carlos Akapo (against Tunisia)
- (Tunisia) Firas Chaouat (against Equatorial Guinea)
