= Federico Obama =

Equatoguinean footballer (born 2000)

Personal information
- Full name: Federico Ondo Obama Ondo
- Date of birth: 4 February 2000 (age 26)
- Place of birth: Kie-Ntem, Equatorial Guinea
- Height: 1.70 m (5 ft 7 in)
- Position: Defender

Youth career
- 2008–2019: Atlético Madrid

Senior career*
Years	Team	Apps	(Gls)
2020	Acero	5	(0)
2020	Unión Adarve	1	(0)
2023–2024	Penya Encarnada	9	(0)

International career^{‡}
2019	Equatorial Guinea U23	2	(0)
2017–2018	Equatorial Guinea	2	(0)
- * Club domestic league appearances and goals as of 19 May 2023 ‡ National team caps and goals as of 28 May 2018

Federico Ondo Obama Ondo (born 4 February 2000), also known as Fede, is an Equatoguinean professional footballer who last played as a fullback for Andorran Primera Divisió club Penya Encarnada d'Andorra. He capped for the Equatorial Guinea national team. He also holds Spanish citizenship.

== Professional career ==
Fede moved to Spain at a young age from Equatorial Guinea, and raised in Móstoles. Fede joined the youth academy of Atlético Madrid in 2008. In 2012, he played for the under–12 team of the Community of Madrid.

== International career ==
Fede, at the age of 17, was called up to the senior Equatorial Guinea national football team in August 2017. He made his debut on 3 September 2017, starting in a 2-1 friendly loss to Benin. The match was eliminated from FIFA records, as the referee and his assistants referees were from Equatorial Guinea. As it was a friendly which besides was not recognized by FIFA, Fede remains eligible to Spain (as a naturalized citizen).

== Personal life ==
Obama's twin brother, Salomón, is also a footballer and plays for Liga de Expansión MX club Tlaxcala and the Equatorial Guinea national team as a forward.
