= 2021 Africa Cup of Nations qualification Group D =

Football tournament qualifying stage

Group D of the 2021 Africa Cup of Nations qualification tournament was one of the twelve groups that decided the teams which qualified for the 2021 Africa Cup of Nations finals tournament. The group consisted of four teams: DR Congo, Gabon, Angola and Gambia (winners of the preliminary round).

The teams played against each other in home-and-away round-robin format, originally scheduled between November 2019 and September 2020.

Due to the COVID-19 pandemic, all matches of matchdays 3 and 4 scheduled for March 2020 were postponed until further notice. FIFA recommended that all June 2020 international matches (matchday 5) be postponed, and also postponed the September 2020 window (matchday 6) for CAF.

On 30 June 2020, the CAF announced the 2021 Africa Cup of Nations final tournament had been postponed from January 2021 to January 2022, without announcing the new dates of the remaining qualifiers. On 19 August 2020, the CAF announced the new dates of the remaining qualifiers, with matchdays 3 and 4 rescheduled to be played between 9–17 November 2020, and matchdays 5 and 6 rescheduled to be played between 22 and 30 March 2021.

Gambia and Gabon, the group winners and runners-up respectively, qualified for the 2021 Africa Cup of Nations.

== Standings ==
Pos	Team	Pld	W	D	L	GF	GA	GD	Pts	Qualification	Gambia	Gabon	Democratic Republic of the Congo	Angola
1	Gambia	6	3	1	2	9	7	+2	10 (Note: Tied on head-to-head points (3), on head-to-head goal difference (0), on head-to-head goals scored (3), on head-to-head away goals scored (1) and on overall goal difference (+2). Overall goals scored: Gambia 9, Gabon 8.)	Final tournament	—	2–1	2–2	1–0
2	Gabon	6	3	1	2	8	6	+2	10	Final tournament	2–1	—	3–0	2–1
3	DR Congo	6	2	3	1	4	5	−1	9		1–0	0–0	—	0–0
4	Angola	6	1	1	4	4	7	−3	4		1–3	2–0	0–1	—

Source: CAF
Rules for classification: Tiebreakers

== Matches ==
13 November 2019
20:00 UTC+1

Angola	1–3	Gambia
Eduardo 3'	Report	Ceesay 16', 17'; Marreh 89'

Estádio 11 de Novembro, Luanda
Referee: Osiase Koto (Lesotho)
14 November 2019
20:00 UTC+1

DR Congo	0–0	Gabon
	Report

Stade des Martyrs, Kinshasa
Referee: Hassan Mohamed Hagi (Somalia)

17 November 2019
20:00 UTC+1

Gabon	2–1	Angola
Boupendza 27'; Bouanga 45'	Report	Yano 84'

Stade de Franceville, Franceville
Referee: Bernard Camille (Seychelles)
18 November 2019
16:00 UTC+0

Gambia	2–2	DR Congo
Jagne 52'; Jobe 90+2'	Report	Bakambu 45+3'; Muleka 75'

Independence Stadium, Bakau
Referee: Norman Matemera (Zimbabwe)

12 November 2020
20:00 UTC+1

Gabon	2–1	Gambia
Bouanga 8'; Aubameyang 55'	Report	Jobe 81'

Stade de Franceville, Franceville
Referee: Kouassi Attiogbe (Togo)
14 November 2020
20:00 UTC+1

DR Congo	0–0	Angola
	Report

Stade des Martyrs, Kinshasa
Referee: Sadok Selmi (Tunisia)

16 November 2020
16:00 UTC+0

Gambia	2–1	Gabon
Mo. Barrow 49'; Mu. Barrow 79'	Report	Ecuele Manga 89'

Independence Stadium, Bakau
Referee: Pacifique Ndabihawenimana (Burundi)
17 November 2020
17:00 UTC+1

Angola	0–1	DR Congo
	Report	Kebano 64'

Estádio 11 de Novembro, Luanda
Referee: Victor Gomes (South Africa)

25 March 2021
17:00 UTC+1

Gabon	3–0	DR Congo
Boupendza 44'; Bouanga 72'; Aubameyang 86'	Report

Stade de Franceville, Franceville
Referee: Janny Sikazwe (Zambia)
25 March 2021
16:00 UTC+0

Gambia	1–0	Angola
Ceesay 62'	Report

Independence Stadium, Bakau
Referee: Adissa Abdul Ligali (Benin)

29 March 2021
17:00 UTC+1

DR Congo	1–0	Gambia
Kasengu 45+2' (pen.)	Report

Stade des Martyrs, Kinshasa
Referee: Amin Mohamed Omar (Egypt)
29 March 2021
17:00 UTC+1

Angola	2–0	Gabon
Show 63'; Augusto 69'	Report

Estádio 11 de Novembro, Luanda
Referee: Gehad Grisha (Egypt)

== Goalscorers ==
There were 25 goals scored in 12 matches, for an average of 2.08 goals per match.

3 goals

- (Gabon) Denis Bouanga
- (The Gambia) Assan Ceesay

2 goals

- (Gabon) Pierre-Emerick Aubameyang
- (Gabon) Aaron Boupendza
- (The Gambia) Bubacarr Jobe

1 goal

- (Angola) Loide Augusto
- (Angola) Wilson Eduardo
- (Angola) Show
- (Angola) Yano
- (Democratic Republic of the Congo) Cédric Bakambu
- (Democratic Republic of the Congo) Kazadi Kasengu
- (Democratic Republic of the Congo) Neeskens Kebano
- (Democratic Republic of the Congo) Jackson Muleka
- (Gabon) Bruno Ecuele Manga
- (The Gambia) Modou Barrow
- (The Gambia) Musa Barrow
- (The Gambia) Pa Modou Jagne
- (The Gambia) Sulayman Marreh
