= 2021 Africa Cup of Nations qualification Group I =

Football tournament qualifying stage

Group I of the 2021 Africa Cup of Nations qualification tournament was one of the twelve groups that decided the teams which qualified for the 2021 Africa Cup of Nations finals tournament. The group consisted of four teams: Senegal, Congo, Guinea-Bissau, and Eswatini.

The teams played against each other in home-and-away round-robin format, originally scheduled between November 2019 and September 2020.

Due to the COVID-19 pandemic, all matches of matchdays 3 and 4 scheduled for March 2020 were postponed until further notice. FIFA recommended that all June 2020 international matches (matchday 5) be postponed, and also postponed the September 2020 window (matchday 6) for CAF.

On 30 June 2020, the CAF announced the 2021 Africa Cup of Nations final tournament had been postponed from January 2021 to January 2022, without announcing the new dates of the remaining qualifiers. On 19 August 2020, the CAF announced the new dates of the remaining qualifiers, with matchdays 3 and 4 rescheduled to be played between 9–17 November 2020, and matchdays 5 and 6 rescheduled to be played between 22 and 30 March 2021.

Senegal and Guinea-Bissau, the group winners and runners-up respectively, qualified for the 2021 Africa Cup of Nations.

== Standings ==
Pos	Team	Pld	W	D	L	GF	GA	GD	Pts	Qualification	Senegal	Guinea-Bissau	Republic of the Congo	Eswatini
1	Senegal	6	4	2	0	10	2	+8	14	Final tournament	—	2–0	2–0	1–1
2	Guinea-Bissau	6	3	0	3	9	7	+2	9	Final tournament	0–1	—	3–0	3–0
3	Congo	6	2	2	2	5	5	0	8		0–0	3–0	—	2–0
4	Eswatini	6	0	2	4	3	13	−10	2		1–4	1–3	0–0	—

Source: CAF
Rules for classification: Tiebreakers

== Matches ==
13 November 2019
16:00 UTC+0

Guinea-Bissau	3–0	Eswatini
Jorginho 40'; Piqueti 45'; João Mário 73'	Report

Estádio 24 de Setembro, Bissau
Referee: Abdoul Ohabee Kanoso (Madagascar)
13 November 2019
19:00 UTC+0

Senegal	2–0	Congo
S. Sarr 26'; Diallo 28'	Report

Stade Lat-Dior, Thiès
Referee: Gehad Grisha (Egypt)

17 November 2019
15:00 UTC+2

Eswatini	1–4	Senegal
Mamba 70'	Report	Diédhiou 59', 66', 68'; Ndiaye 77'

Mavuso Sports Centre, Manzini
Referee: Nehemia Shoovaleka (Namibia)
17 November 2019
17:00 UTC+1

Congo	3–0	Guinea-Bissau
Ibara 19'; Ganvoula 70'; Makiesse 79'	Report

Stade Alphonse Massemba-Débat, Brazzaville
Referee: Fabricio Duarte (Cape Verde)

11 November 2020
16:00 UTC+0

Senegal	2–0	Guinea-Bissau
Mané 44' (pen.); Nguette 74'	Report

Stade Lat-Dior, Thiès
Referee: Eric Otogo-Castane (Gabon)
12 November 2020
17:00 UTC+1

Congo	2–0	Eswatini
Ibara 77'; Makiesse 81'	Report

Stade Alphonse Massemba-Débat, Brazzaville
Referee: Joseph Odey Ogabor (Nigeria)

15 November 2020
16:00 UTC+0

Guinea-Bissau	0–1	Senegal
	Report	Mané 82'

Estádio 24 de Setembro, Bissau
Referee: Adil Zourak (Morocco)
16 November 2020
15:00 UTC+2

Eswatini	0–0	Congo
	Report

Mavuso Sports Centre, Manzini
Referee: Hassan Mohamed Hagi (Somalia)

26 March 2021
15:00 UTC+2

Eswatini	1–3	Guinea-Bissau
Badenhorst 21'	Report	Djaló 15'; Semedo 25'; Pelé 50'

Mavuso Sports Centre, Manzini
Referee: Jean-Claude Ishimwe (Rwanda)
26 March 2021
17:00 UTC+1

Congo	0–0	Senegal
	Report

Stade Alphonse Massemba-Débat, Brazzaville
Referee: Mahmoud El Banna (Egypt)

30 March 2021
16:00 UTC+0

Senegal	1–1	Eswatini
Kouyaté 90+6'	Report	Gamedze 9'

Stade Lat-Dior, Thiès
Referee: Sekou Ahmed Toure (Guinea)
30 March 2021
16:00 UTC+0

Guinea-Bissau	3–0	Congo
Piqueti 45+1'; Mendy 73'; Jorginho 80'	Report

Estádio 24 de Setembro, Bissau
Referee: Kouassi Attiogbe (Togo)

== Goalscorers ==
There were 27 goals scored in 12 matches, for an average of 2.25 goals per match.

3 goals

- (Senegal) Famara Diedhiou

2 goals

- (Republic of the Congo) Prince Ibara
- (Republic of the Congo) Junior Makiesse
- (Guinea-Bissau) Jorginho
- (Guinea-Bissau) Piqueti
- (Senegal) Sadio Mané

1 goal

- (Republic of the Congo) Silvère Ganvoula
- (Eswatini) Felix Badenhorst
- (Eswatini) Sabelo Gamedze
- (Eswatini) Fganelo Mamba
- (Guinea-Bissau) Marcelo Djaló
- (Guinea-Bissau) João Mário
- (Guinea-Bissau) Frédéric Mendy
- (Guinea-Bissau) Pelé
- (Guinea-Bissau) Alfa Semedo
- (Senegal) Habib Diallo
- (Senegal) Cheikhou Kouyaté
- (Senegal) Badou Ndiaye
- (Senegal) Opa Nguette
- (Senegal) Sidy Sarr
