= Bakary N'Diaye =

Mauritanian footballer (born 1998)

Personal information
- Full name: Bakary Moussa N'Diaye
- Date of birth: 26 November 1998 (age 27)
- Place of birth: Nouakchott, Mauritania
- Height: 1.85 m (6 ft 1 in)
- Position: Defender

Team information
- Current team: Al-Jazeera

Senior career*
Years	Team	Apps	(Gls)
2014–2017	Tevragh-Zeina		
2017–2020	Difaâ El Jadidi	54	(1)
2021	Polvorín	1	(0)
2021–2022	Rodos	3	(0)
2022	Tevragh-Zeina		
2022–2023	Al-Hudood		
2023	Al-Quwa Al-Jawiya		
2024	Naft Al-Wasat		
2024–2025	Diyala	3	(0)
2026–	Al-Jazeera	0	(0)

International career^{‡}
2016–	Mauritania	39	(1)
- * Club domestic league appearances and goals as of 29 August 2026 ‡ National team caps and goals as of 16 November 2021

Bakary Moussa N'Diaye (born 26 November 1998) is a Mauritanian professional footballer who plays as a central defender or a right-back for Jordanian Pro League club Al-Jazeera and the Mauritania national team.

== Club career ==
Born in Nouakchott, N'Diaye joined Botola Pro side Difaâ Hassani El Jadidi in 2017, from hometown side FC Tevragh-Zeina. He left the club in September 2020 when his contract expired, choosing to sign for a European club instead.

On 17 January 2021, N'Diaye signed a contract with Spanish Segunda División side CD Lugo for the remainder of the season. After only appearing with the farm team in Tercera División, he moved to Greek club Rodos FC on 8 August 2021.

== International career ==
N'Diaye made his full international debut for Mauritania on 28 May 2016, coming on as a late substitute for Mamadou Niass in a 2–0 friendly win against Gabon. On 21 May 2019, he was named in Mauritania's 23-man squad for the 2019 Africa Cup of Nations in Egypt.

N'Diaye scored his first international goal on 11 November 2020, netting the opener in a 1–1 home draw against Burundi, for the 2021 Africa Cup of Nations qualifiers.

=== International goals ===
Scores and results list Mauritania's goal tally first.

No	Date	Venue	Opponent	Score	Result	Competition
1.	11 November 2020	Stade Cheikha Ould Boïdiya, Nouakchott	Burundi	1–0	1–1	2021 Africa Cup of Nations qualification

== Honours ==
Tevragh-Zeina

- Ligue 1 Mauritania: 2014–15, 2015–16
