= João Mário (footballer, born October 1993) =

Guinea-Bissauan footballer

Personal information
- Full name: João Mário Nunes Fernandes
- Date of birth: 11 October 1993 (age 33)
- Place of birth: Bissau, Guinea-Bissau
- Height: 1.85 m (6 ft 1 in)
- Position: Forward

Team information
- Current team: Zakynthos
- Number: 28

Youth career
- 2010–2011: Étoile Lusitana
- 2012: Benfica

Senior career*
Years	Team	Apps	(Gls)
2012–2013	Benfica B	30	(2)
2013–2014	Atlético	36	(8)
2014–2017	Chaves	50	(2)
2017–2020	Académico Viseu	70	(4)
2020–2022	Académica	30	(6)
2022	Vilafranquense	10	(0)
2023	Spartak Varna	11	(2)
2023	Hoang Anh Gia Lai	0	(0)
2024	Quy Nhon Binh Dinh	3	(0)
2024–2026	Olympiakos Nicosia	46	(10)
2026–	Zakynthos	3	(0)

International career
2011–2022	Guinea-Bissau	16	(2)
- * Club domestic league appearances and goals as of 19 September 2026

João Mário Nunes Fernandes (born 11 October 1993) is a Bissau-Guinean professional footballer who plays as a forward for Super League Greece 2 club Zakynthos.

== Club career ==
Born in Bissau, João Mário moved to Portugal to complete his development in late 2011, joining S.L. Benfica. On 11 August 2012 he made his debut as a professional, appearing as a late substitute for the reserve team in a 2–2 home draw against S.C. Braga B in the Segunda Liga. Sixteen days later, in the same competition, he scored his first goal, contributing to a 6–0 home rout of C.F. Os Belenenses after a free kick by Miguel Rosa hit the bar and bounced back to him.

In the following years, João Mário continued competing in the Portuguese second division, representing Atlético Clube de Portugal and G.D. Chaves. He scored once from 22 matches in the 2015–16 season, as the latter club returned to the Primeira Liga after an absence of 17 years.

João Mário's first match in the Portuguese top flight took place on 20 August 2016, and he scored in the 1–1 draw with C.D. Tondela at the Estádio Municipal Eng. Manuel Branco Teixeira. He only appeared in a further eight games during the campaign, in an escape from relegation.

Subsequently, João Mário returned to division two, agreeing to a contract at Académico de Viseu F.C. as a free agent. He scored two goals in the side's semi-final run in the 2019–20 Taça de Portugal, including in a 1–1 home draw against FC Porto in the first leg of that stage.

João Mário signed with second-tier Académica de Coimbra on 22 July 2020. The following March, while on international duty, he suffered a serious injury that sidelined him for nearly one year.

On 29 July 2022, João Mário joined U.D. Vilafranquense for free. He moved to the First Professional Football League (Bulgaria) in the following transfer window, on a one-and-a-half-year contract at FC Spartak Varna.

João Mário then took his game to the V.League 1, where he represented LPBank Hoang Anh Gia Lai FC and MerryLand Quy Nhon Binh Dinh FC. In August 2024, he joined Cypriot Second Division club Olympiakos Nicosia on an initial one-year deal.

On 8 July 2026, João Mário signed for Super League Greece 2 side A.P.S. Zakynthos on a free transfer.

== International career ==
João Mário earned his first cap for Guinea-Bissau before his 18th birthday, in a friendly in Equatorial Guinea. He scored his first goal for his country on 13 November 2019, in a 3–0 defeat of Eswatini in his hometown for the 2021 Africa Cup of Nations qualifiers.

=== International goals ===
As of 24 September 2022 (Guinea-Bissau score listed first, score column indicates score after each João Mário goal)

No.	Date	Venue	Opponent	Score	Result	Competition
1.	13 November 2019	Estádio 24 de Setembro, Bissau, Guinea-Bissau	Eswatini	3–0	3–0	2021 Africa Cup of Nations qualification
2.	24 September 2022	Stade Pierre-Aliker, Fort-de-France, Martinique	Martinique	1–1	1–1	Friendly
