= Samuel Chukwueze =

Nigerian footballer (born 1999)

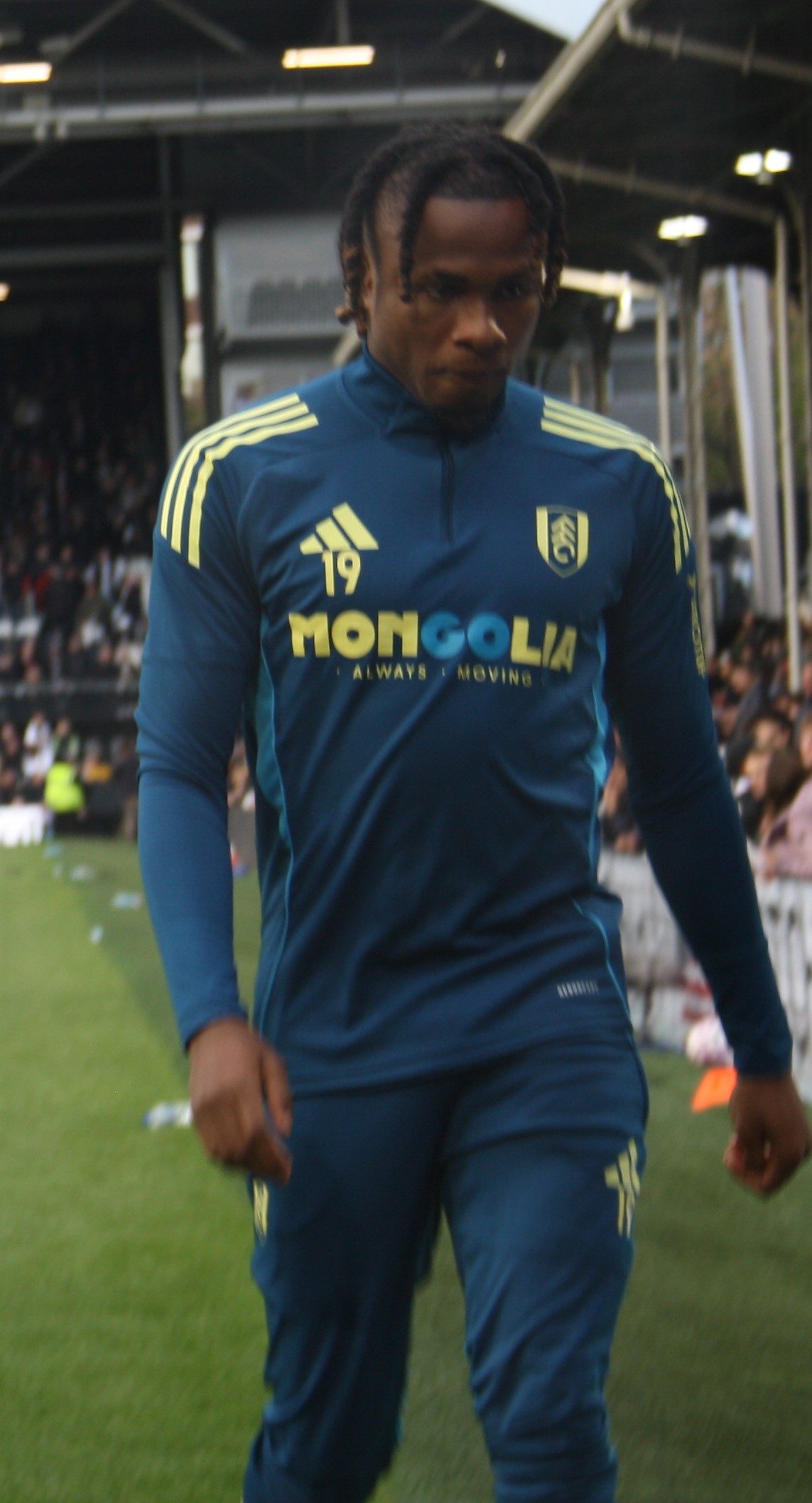
- Chukwueze with Fulham in 2025

Personal information
- Full name: Samuel Chimerenka Chukwueze
- Date of birth: 22 May 1999 (age 27)
- Place of birth: Abia State, Nigeria
- Height: 1.72 m (5 ft 8 in)
- Positions: Winger; right wing-back

Team information
- Current team: AC Milan
- Number: 21

Youth career
- Future Hope
- New Generation Academy
- 2012–2017: Diamond Football Academy
- 2017–2018: Villarreal

Senior career*
Years	Team	Apps	(Gls)
2018	Villarreal B	20	(4)
2018–2023	Villarreal	155	(21)
2023–	AC Milan	58	(4)
2025–2026	→ Fulham (loan)	23	(3)

International career^{‡}
2015	Nigeria U17	7	(3)
2018–	Nigeria	60	(7)
Medal record
Representing Nigeria
Africa Cup of Nations
Runner-up	2023 Ivory Coast
Third place	2019 Egypt
Third place	2025 Morocco
FIFA U-17 World Cup
Winner	2015 Chile
- * Club domestic league appearances and goals as of 17:02, 18 October 2026 (UTC) ‡ National team caps and goals as of 23:26, 25 September 2026 (UTC)

Samuel Chimerenka Chukwueze MON (born 22 May 1999) is a Nigerian professional footballer who plays as a winger or right wing-back for Serie A club AC Milan and the Nigeria national team.

== Early life and education ==
Chukwueze was born in Amaokwe Ugba Ibeku, Abia State. He is of Igbo descent and was brought up in a Christian family with a younger brother and a younger sister. He attended Government College Umuahia and Evangel Secondary School. He started playing football at the age of 8 and he admired Jay-Jay Okocha and Arjen Robben as his football idols growing up.

== Club career ==
=== Villarreal ===
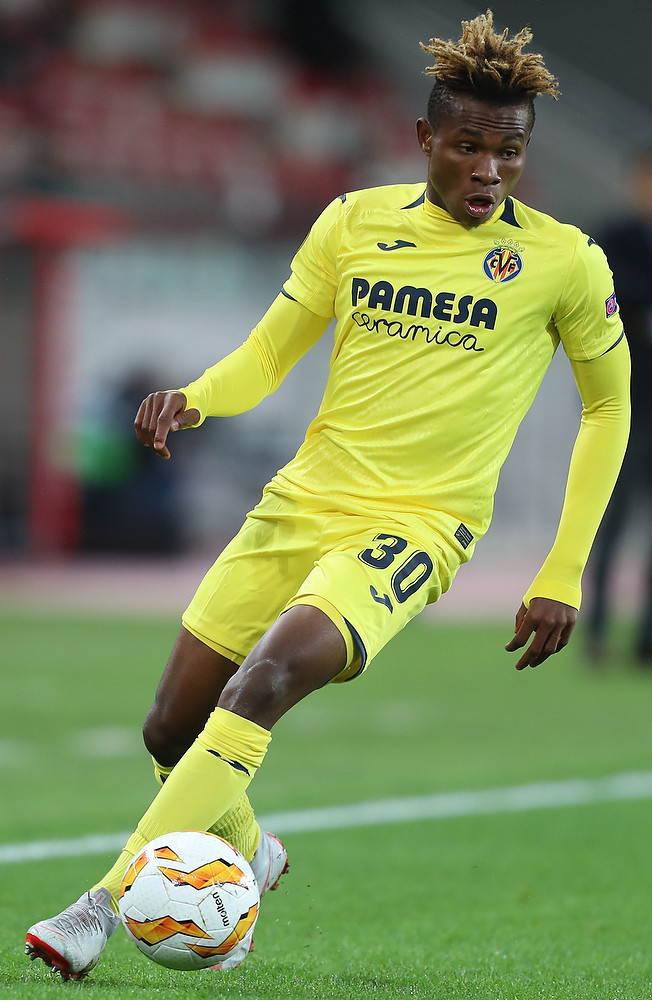
Chukwueze with Villarreal in 2018

Chukwueze joined Villarreal's prolific youth setup in 2017, from local side Diamond Football Academy. After being initially assigned to the club's Juvenil A squad, he made his senior debut with the reserves on 15 April 2018, coming on as a second-half substitute for Sergio Lozano in a 1–1 Segunda División B away draw against Sabadell.

Chukwueze scored his first senior goal on 20 May 2018, netting his team's second in a 3–2 away defeat against Bilbao Athletic. He contributed with two goals in 11 appearances during his first season, as his side missed out promotion in the play-offs.

Chukwueze made his first-team debut on 21 September 2018, replacing Nicola Sansone in a 2–2 home draw against Rangers, for the 2018–19 UEFA Europa League. He also made his Laliga debut on 5 November 2018, playing a 90-minute full play in a 1–1 home draw against Levante, for the 2018–19 La Liga.

In April 2019, he won the Nigeria Football Federation's 2018 Young Player of the Year award.

On 12 April 2022, in the second leg of the 2021–22 UEFA Champions League quarter-final away to Bayern Munich, Chukwueze scored the equaliser in the 88th minute, helping Villarreal progress to the semi-finals of the tournament.

On 8 April 2023, Chukwueze scored a brace and recorded an assist against Real Madrid in a 3–2 away victory.

=== AC Milan ===
On 27 July 2023, Serie A club AC Milan announced the signing of Chukwueze, on a contract until 30 June 2028.

On 28 November, he scored his first goal at the club in a 3–1 home defeat against Borussia Dortmund in the Champions League.

On 13 December, Chukwueze scored a later winner in the 84th minute in a 2–1 away victory over Newcastle United, which made his club to finish third in their group and qualify to the Europa League.

On 17 March, in a Serie A match against Hellas Verona, he came on as a substitute and scored the last goal in a 3–1 win, his first league goal for AC Milan.

On 14 April 2024, in the league game against Sassuolo, Chukwueze scored two goals, both of which were disallowed for offsides.

After returning to Milan following his loan spell at Fulham, Chukwueze became a more prominent part of the team under new head coach Rúben Amorim during the 2026–27 season.

==== Loan to Fulham ====
On 1 September 2025, he moved to England and joined Premier League club Fulham, on an initial one-year loan deal with the option to buy at the end of the 2025–26 season.

== International career ==
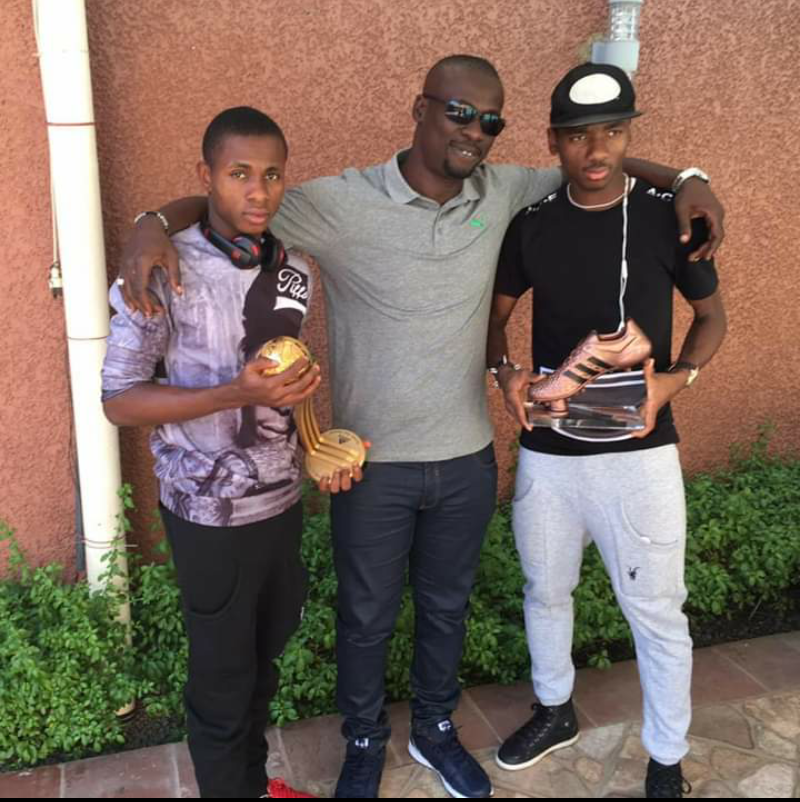
Chukwueze (left) with Victor Apugo (centre) and Kelechi Nwakali (right) in 2015

After playing for Nigeria at under-17 level, he received his first call-up to the senior team in October 2018. He made his debut for the Nigerian senior team on 20 November 2018 as a starter in a 0–0 friendly draw against Uganda.

In May 2019, Chukwueze was invited to represent Nigeria's senior team at the Africa Cup of Nations and the Under-20 team at the Under-20 World Cup. However, Villarreal said he could only play in one of the tournaments. He ultimately decided to take part with Nigerian's senior squad for Africa Cup of Nations hosted in Egypt and scored his first senior goal in Nigeria's 2–1 win over South Africa in the quarter finals.

Two years later, Chukwueze was selected to participate in the 2021 Africa Cup of Nations. Nigeria defeated Tunisia 1–0 in the round of 16.

On 29 December 2023, he was selected from the list of 25 Nigerian players selected by José Peseiro to compete in the 2023 Africa Cup of Nations.

On 11 December 2025, Chukwueze was called up to the Nigeria squad for the 2025 Africa Cup of Nations.

== Style of play ==
Chukwueze's biggest strength is his pace and his runs in behind the defense. He is known for his pace and his ability to use it effectively by drifting infield and peeling away. He is very mobile and has good ball control. Former Villarreal defender, Alberto Moreno compared Chukwueze's style of play to that of former Liverpool forward, Sadio Mané, indicating that they play football in a similar way.

Chukwueze has been noted to have a weak right foot, which affects his ability to make crosses and progress possession when faced with a strong 1 v 1 defender. His predictable dribbling style can also make it challenging for him to progress the ball in certain situations. Chukwueze's defensive contribution has been described as weak, and he tends to prefer playing short passes without diving into tackles.

Chukwueze is known for his pace, runs in behind the defense, and explosive playing style, which has drawn comparisons to Mané.

== Career statistics ==
=== Club ===
As of match played 18 October 2026

Appearances and goals by club, season and competition
Club	Season	League			National cup (Note: Includes Copa del Rey, Coppa Italia, FA Cup)		League cup (Note: Includes EFL Cup)		Europe		Total	
Club	Season	Division	Apps	Goals	Apps	Goals	Apps	Goals	Apps	Goals	Apps	Goals
Villarreal B	2017–18	Segunda División B	11	2	—		—		—		11	2
Villarreal B	2018–19	Segunda División B	9	2	—		—		—		9	2
Villarreal B	Total		20	4	—		—		—		20	4
Villarreal	2018–19	La Liga	26	5	3	2	—		9 (Note: Appearances in UEFA Europa League)	1	38	8
Villarreal	2019–20	La Liga	37	3	4	1	—		—		41	4
Villarreal	2020–21	La Liga	28	4	1	0	—		11	1	40	5
Villarreal	2021–22	La Liga	27	3	2	2	—		9 (Note: Appearances in UEFA Champions League)	2	38	7
Villarreal	2022–23	La Liga	37	6	4	4	—		9 (Note: Appearances in UEFA Europa Conference League)	3	50	13
Villarreal	Total		155	21	14	9	—		38	7	207	37
AC Milan	2023–24	Serie A	24	1	1	0	—		8 (Note: Four appearances and two goals in UEFA Champions League, four appearances in UEFA Europa League)	2	33	3
AC Milan	2024–25	Serie A	26	3	3	2	—		7	0	36	5
AC Milan	2025–26	Serie A	1	0	0	0	—		—		1	0
AC Milan	2026–27	Serie A	7	0	0	0	—		1	0	8	0
AC Milan	Total		58	4	4	2	—		16	2	78	8
Fulham (loan)	2025–26	Premier League	23	3	1	0	1	0	—		25	3
Career total			256	32	19	11	1	0	54	9	330	52

=== International ===
As of match played 25 September 2026

Appearances and goals by national team and year
National team	Year	Apps	Goals
Nigeria	2018	1	0
Nigeria	2019	12	2
Nigeria	2020	4	1
Nigeria	2021	2	0
Nigeria	2022	6	1
Nigeria	2023	5	1
Nigeria	2024	12	1
Nigeria	2025	11	1
Nigeria	2026	7	0
Total		60	7

Scores and results list Nigeria's goal tally first, score column indicates score after each Chukwueze goal.

List of international goals scored by Samuel Chukwueze
No.	Date	Venue	Opponent	Score	Result	Competition
1	10 July 2019	Cairo International Stadium, Cairo, Egypt	South Africa	1–0	2–1	2019 Africa Cup of Nations
2	17 November 2019	Setsoto Stadium, Maseru, Lesotho	Lesotho	2–1	4–2	2021 Africa Cup of Nations qualification
3	13 November 2020	Ogbe Stadium, Benin City, Nigeria	Sierra Leone	4–0	4–4	2021 Africa Cup of Nations qualification
4	15 January 2022	Roumdé Adjia Stadium, Garoua, Cameroon	Sudan	1–0	3–1	2021 Africa Cup of Nations
5	10 September 2023	Godswill Akpabio International Stadium, Uyo, Nigeria	São Tomé and Príncipe	6–0	6–0	2023 Africa Cup of Nations qualification
6	18 November 2024	Godswill Akpabio International Stadium, Uyo, Nigeria	Rwanda	1–0	1–2	2025 Africa Cup of Nations qualification
7	31 May 2025	Brentford Community Stadium, London, England	Jamaica	2–1	2–2 (5–4 p	2025 Unity Cup

== Honours ==
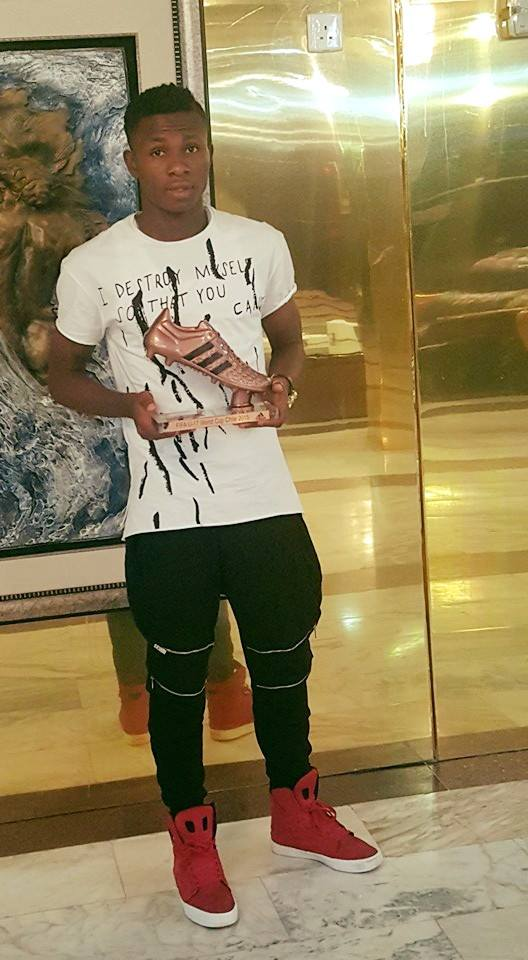
Chukwueze holding the 2015 FIFA U-17 World Cup Bronze Boot

Villarreal

- UEFA Europa League: 2020–21

AC Milan

- Supercoppa Italiana: 2024–25

Nigeria U17

- FIFA U-17 World Cup: 2015

Nigeria

- Africa Cup of Nations runner-up: 2023; third place: 2019, 2025
- Unity Cup: 2025

Individual

- FIFA U-17 World Cup Bronze Boot: 2015
- UEFA Europa League Top assist provider: 2020–21
- La Liga African MVP: 2022–23

Orders

- Member of the Order of the Niger
