= Collins Sikombe =

Zambian footballer (born 1997)

Personal information
- Date of birth: 19 June 1997 (age 29)
- Place of birth: Lusaka, Zambia
- Height: 1.79 m (5 ft 10 in)
- Position: Midfielder

Team information
- Current team: NAPSA Stars

Senior career*
Years	Team	Apps	(Gls)
2015–2016	Lusaka Dynamos		
2016–	NAPSA Stars		
2018	→ Lusaka Dynamos (loan)		

International career^{‡}
2017–	Zambia	22	(5)
- * Club domestic league appearances and goals ‡ National team caps and goals as of 13 June 2021

Collins Sikombe (born 19 June 1997) is a Zambian footballer who plays as a midfielder for NAPSA Stars and the Zambia national football team.

== Career ==
=== Club ===
In 2018, Sikombe was the subject of a dispute between NAPSA Stars and Lusaka Dynamos, in which NAPSA attempted to recall Sikombe from a loan Lusaka Dynamos claimed he wasn't on, arguing they had purchased him.

=== International ===
Sikombe made his senior international debut on 4 June 2017 in a 0-0 friendly draw with Gabon.

== Career statistics ==
=== International ===
As of matches played 13 June 2021.

National team	Year	Apps	Goals
Zambia	2017	2	0
Zambia	2018	3	0
Zambia	2019	0	0
Zambia	2020	8	4
Zambia	2021	9	1
Total		22	5

==== International goals ====
Scores and results list Zambia's goal tally first.

No.	Date	Venue	Opponent	Score	Result	Competition
1.	12 March 2020	Nkoloma Stadium, Lusaka, Zambia	Malawi	1–0	1–0	Friendly
2.	7 October 2020	National Heroes Stadium, Lusaka, Zambia	Malawi	1–0	1–0	Friendly
3.	25 October 2020	Addis Ababa Stadium, Addis Ababa, Ethiopia	Ethiopia	2–0	3–1	Friendly
4.	12 November 2020	National Heroes Stadium, Lusaka, Zambia	Botswana	2–1	2–1	2021 Africa Cup of Nations qualification
5.	19 January 2021	Limbe Stadium, Limbe, Cameroon	Tanzania	2–0	2–0	2020 African Nations Championship
