= Fahad Bayo =

Ugandan footballer (born 1998)

Bayo Aziz Fahad
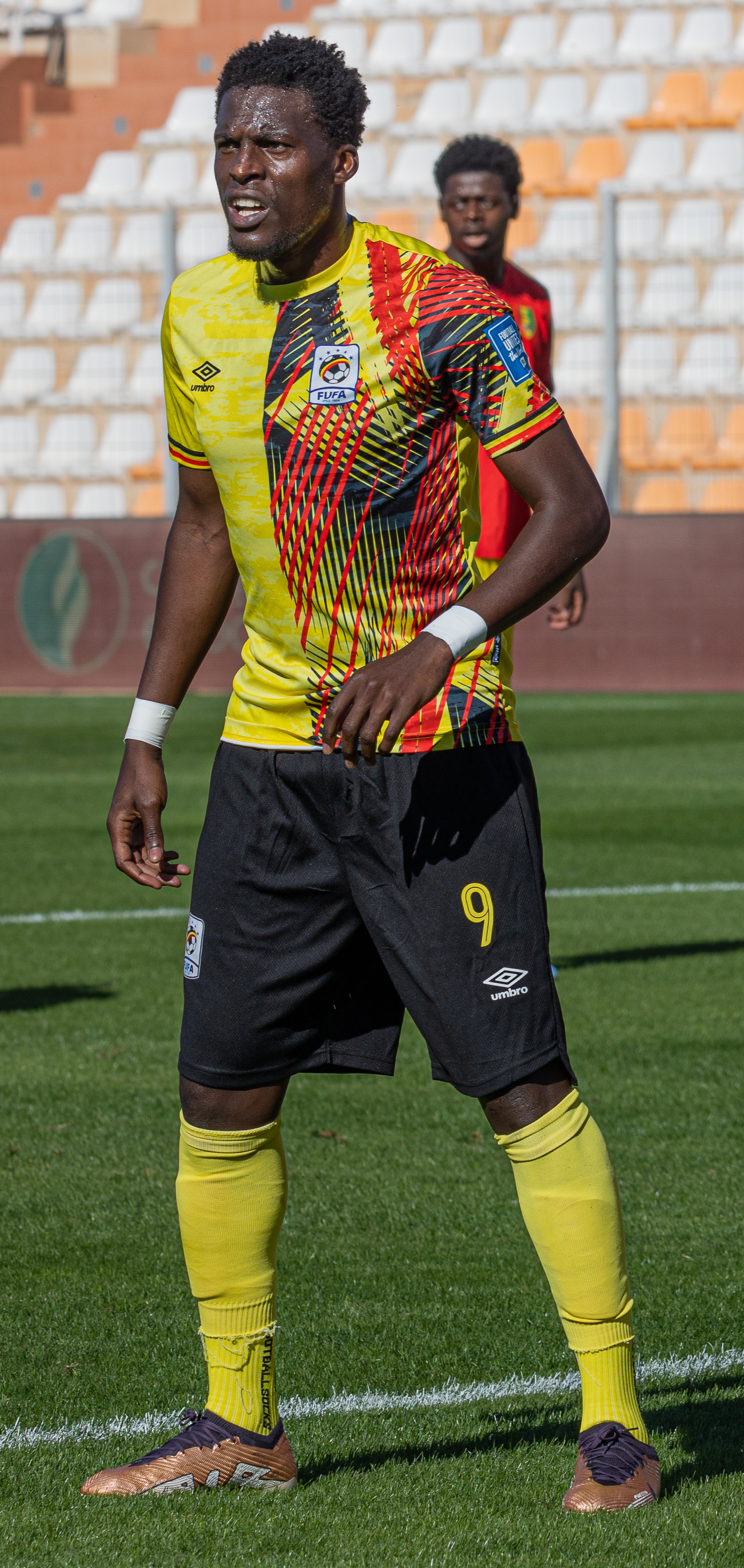
- Fahad Bayo with Buildcon in 2018

Personal information
- Date of birth: 10 May 1998 (age 28)
- Place of birth: Lugazi, Uganda
- Height: 1.85 m (6 ft 1 in)
- Position: Forward

Team information
- Current team: Arsimi (on loan from FK Varda4)
- Number: 9

Youth career
- 2009–2011: Lugazi Young Academy
- 2011–2013: Friends Soccer Academy

Senior career*
Years	Team	Apps	(Gls)
2014–2018	Proline	68	(30)
2018–2019	Buildcon	39	(6)
2019–2020	Vipers	23	(12)
2020–2022	Ashdod	36	(7)
2022	→ Bnei Sakhnin	10	(1)
2023–2024	MFK Vyškov	42	(8)
2025	Welwalo Adigrat	6	(2)
2025–	Vardar	1	(0)
2026–	→ Arsimi (loan)	14	(0)

International career^{‡}
2018–	Uganda	25	(9)
- * Club domestic league appearances and goals as of 18 June 2026 ‡ National team caps and goals as of 21 November 2023

Bayo Aziz Fahad (born 10 May 1998) is a Ugandan professional footballer who plays as a forward for Macedonian First Football League club Arsimi, on loan from Vardar. Bayo has played internationally for Uganda.

== Youth career ==
Bayo was the top scorer in the Uganda National Secondary Schools competition Copa Coca Cola in 2014. He scored 11 goals for the champions, Kibuli Secondary School

== Club career ==
=== Proline FC ===
He joined Proline FC in 2014 at age 16. He played 25 games and scored 16 goals in the 2015–16 season of the second biggest league in Uganda, the Uganda Big League.

His performance contributed to the promotion of Proline FC to the Uganda Premier League.

In the 2016–17 season, he scored six goals for Proline. He played 18 games.

Bayo played half of the 2017-18 Uganda Premier League season. He scored six goals in 14 league games. He joined the Zambian club Buildcon F.C. during the season break.

=== Buildcon FC ===
At age 18, Bayo joined the Zambian club Buildcon F.C. in January 2018. He has scored nine goals and made six assists in 16 games.

=== F.C. Ashdod ===
On 27 July 2020 signed in the Israeli Premier League club F.C. Ashdod.

=== FK Vardar ===
In August 2025 Bayo signed in the North Macedonia League for club FK Vardar.

Club Career
Year	Club	Club Appearances	Goals scored
2018–	Buildcon FC	16	9
2014–2018	Proline FC	68	30
Friends of Soccer Academy			

== International career ==
Bayo received a call-up to the Uganda National Senior team from coach Sebastien Desabre in March 2018 during the international break. Bayo played in both friendlies against Sao Tome and Malawi.

=== International goals ===
Scores and results list Uganda's goal tally first.

No.	Date	Venue	Opponent	Score	Result	Competition
1.	19 October 2019	StarTimes Stadium, Kampala, Uganda	Burundi	1–0	3–0	2020 African Nations Championship qualification
2.	17 November 2019	Mandela National Stadium, Kampala, Uganda	Malawi	2–0	2–0	2021 Africa Cup of Nations qualification
3.	7 December 2019	StarTimes Stadium, Kampala, Uganda	Burundi	2–0	2–1	2019 CECAFA Cup
4.	17 December 2019	Lugogo Stadium, Kampala, Uganda	Tanzania	1–0	1–0	2019 CECAFA Cup
5.	7 October 2021	Nyamirambo Regional Stadium, Kigali, Rwanda	Rwanda	1–0	1–0	2022 FIFA World Cup qualification
6.	10 October 2021	St. Mary's Stadium-Kitende, Entebbe, Uganda	Rwanda	1–0	1–0	2022 FIFA World Cup qualification
7.	11 November 2021	St. Mary's Stadium-Kitende, Entebbe, Uganda	Kenya	1–1	1–1	2022 FIFA World Cup qualification
8.	18 June 2023	Japoma Stadium, Douala, Cameroon	Algeria	1–2	1–2	2023 Africa Cup of Nations qualification
9.	17 November 2023	Stade Municipal de Berkane, Berkane, Morocco	Guinea	1–1	1–2	2026 FIFA World Cup qualification
