= Bubacarr Jobe =

Gambian footballer (born 1994)

Personal information
- Full name: Bubacarr Jobe
- Date of birth: November 21, 1994 (age 31)
- Place of birth: Serekunda, Gambia
- Height: 1.67 m (5 ft 6 in)
- Position: Forward

Team information
- Current team: Kristianstad FC
- Number: 23

Youth career
- 2011–2013: Texas Rush
- 2013–2014: Force Academy
- 2014–2015: Austin Aztex

Senior career*
Years	Team	Apps	(Gls)
2015–2017	Toronto FC II	19	(1)
2017	→ Skövde AIK (loan)	24	(5)
2018–2021	Mjällby AIF	56	(26)
2020	→ Örgryte IS (loan)	19	(5)
2021–2022	Norrby IF	10	(3)
2023–	Kristianstad FC	40	(15)

International career^{‡}
2018–	Gambia	10	(3)
- * Club domestic league appearances and goals as of 12 June 2021 ‡ National team caps and goals as of 16 May 2020

Bubacarr Jobe (born November 21, 1994) is a Gambian footballer who currently plays for Swedish club Kristianstad FC.

== Career ==
Jobe moved to the United States in 2011, and first played for Rush Soccer alongside Vancouver Whitecaps forward Kekuta Manneh. However, he suffered an ACL injury in the opening weeks of his career in America. He scored four goals in five games during the 2012 Super-20 Championships for Force Football Club Academy, which led to him being named in the All-Tournament Team while being crowned MVP and top scorer. He totalled 10 goals in 27 games for Texas Rush.

Jobe was also named 2014 Montgomery County Player of the Year, having broken the Woodlands High School record with 31 goals in a single season. He later lined-up for Premier Development League side Austin Aztex, where he recorded a prolific rate of seven goals in 12 games.

In 2014, he made a single appearance for Chicago Fire Reserves in the USL while on a three-day trial, and scored the only goal in a 1-0 win over Montreal Impact Reserves.

Jobe later signed for Toronto FC II in August 2015, and made his debut in a 2-1 win over Richmond Kickers on August 15, 2015.

=== International goals ===
Scores and results list Gambia's goal tally first.

No.	Date	Venue	Opponent	Score	Result	Competition
1.	17 November 2018	Independence Stadium, Bakau, Gambia	Benin	2–1	3–1	2019 Africa Cup of Nations qualification
2.	18 November 2019	Independence Stadium, Bakau, Gambia	DR Congo	1–1	2–2	2021 Africa Cup of Nations qualification

== Personal ==
Upon his arrival to the United States, Jobe moved in with Rush Soccer CEO Don Gemmell and his wife Brooke Gemmell. They officially adopted him in 2013, after a number of cultural differences had been overcome by Jobe.
