= Aboubakar Kamara =

Footballer (born 1995)

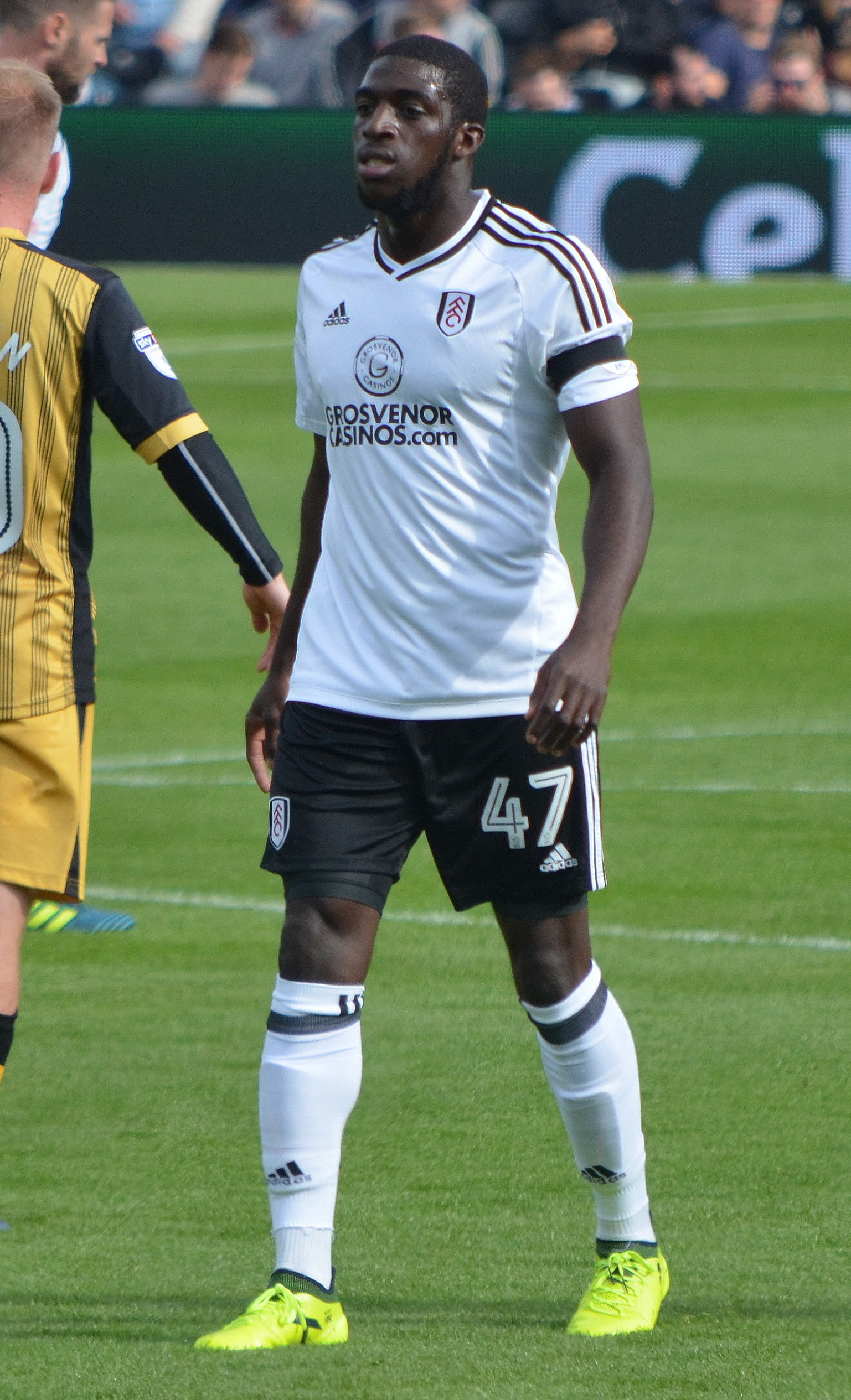
- Kamara playing for Fulham in 2017

Personal information
- Full name: Aboubakar Kamara
- Date of birth: 7 March 1995 (age 31)
- Place of birth: Gonesse, France
- Height: 1.78 m (5 ft 10 in)
- Position: Forward

Team information
- Current team: Negeri Sembilan

Youth career
- –2014: Monaco

Senior career*
Years	Team	Apps	(Gls)
2013–2015	Monaco B	26	(15)
2014–2015	Monaco	2	(0)
2015–2016	Kortrijk	12	(0)
2016–2017	Amiens	45	(16)
2016–2017	Amiens B	1	(0)
2017–2021	Fulham	85	(14)
2019	→ Yeni Malatyaspor (loan)	10	(1)
2021	→ Dijon (loan)	10	(1)
2021–2022	Aris	32	(8)
2022–2023	Olympiacos	1	(0)
2023	→ Aris (loan)	14	(4)
2023–2024	Al-Jazira	10	(3)
2024–2025	Sepahan	15	(1)
2025–2026	Kanchanaburi Power	22	(7)
2026–	Negeri Sembilan	0	(0)

International career^{‡}
2021–	Mauritania	26	(8)
- * Club domestic league appearances and goals as of 10:17, 10 May 2026 (UTC) ‡ National team caps and goals as of 23:43, 15 October 2024 (UTC)

Aboubakar Kamara (born 7 March 1995) is a professional footballer who plays as a forward for Malaysia Super League club Negeri Sembilan. Born in France, he represents Mauritania at international level.

== Club career ==
Kamara made his Ligue 1 debut for Monaco on 12 September 2014 against Olympique Lyonnais in a 2–1 away defeat. He replaced Yannick Carrasco after 84 minutes. In July 2015, Kamara signed a three-year contract with Belgian Pro League side Kortrijk, but returned to France only six months later, joining Championnat National side Amiens and helping the club to achieve back-to-back promotions up to Ligue 1. He scored the first goal of a dramatic 2–1 win against Stade de Reims in the last matchday, with Amiens clinching promotion after retaking the lead in the 6th minute of stoppage time. Kamara ended the season as the club's top goalscorer at the 2016–17 Ligue 2 with 10 goals.

=== Fulham ===
On 31 July 2017, Kamara signed for Fulham for an undisclosed fee on a four-year contract with an option for another 12 months. He chose to wear the number 47 so that his initials and number would match AK-47. On 23 September, Kamara scored his first goal for the club in a 1–1 draw against Middlesbrough, and three days later, he scored the opening goal in a 3–1 win over Nottingham Forest. On 31 October, Kamara was sent off for shoving Bailey Wright off the ball, as Fulham lost 2–0 to Bristol City. He later scored consecutive braces for Fulham in a 2–2 draw with Hull City and in a 4–1 win over Ipswich Town. On 20 January 2018, Kamara scored the final goal in a 6–0 win over Burton Albion. This turned out to be the last goal he scored for Fulham during the 2017–18 season, as he was used sparingly afterwards, with the rest of his appearances coming off the bench.

On 5 December, Kamara scored his first goal of the 2018–19 season in a 1–1 draw against Leicester City, and three days later, he scored a consolation penalty in a 4–1 loss to Manchester United, after coming on at half-time for Aleksandar Mitrović. On 29 December, against Huddersfield Town, Kamara argued with Mitrović over taking a penalty; his effort was saved by Jonas Lössl. Although Fulham won the match, manager Claudio Ranieri was angered by Kamara's decision to take the penalty, stating: "He did not respect me, the club, team-mates and crowd. I spoke with him, it is not right". Mitrović however was more forgiving of Kamara, referring to the incident as "normal". On New Year's Day, Kamara scored against Arsenal, in an eventual 4–1 loss. During January, Kamara had another altercation with Mitrović in a yoga session at the club's training ground, and as a result, was left out of the team squad for Fulham's match against Burnley. Later that month, Kamara was arrested at the club's training ground on suspicion of actual bodily harm and criminal damage and was "banned indefinitely from all club activities".

==== Loan to Yeni Malatyaspor ====
Kamara had been training with the under-23 squad, and, on 31 January 2019, joined Yeni Malatyaspor on loan until the end of the season.

==== Fulham ====
Kamara returned to Fulham for the 2019–20 season from his loan spell with Yeni Malatyaspor.

==== Loan to Dijon ====
On 1 February 2021, Kamara joined French side Dijon on a 5-month loan deal.

=== Aris ===
On 16 August 2021, Super League Greece team Aris confirmed they had signed Kamara from Fulham, for a €3.5 million transfer fee. The 26-year-old scored 17 goals in 94 appearances for the Cottagers after arriving from French side Amiens in 2017. Kamara was part of two successful promotion campaigns, starting both of Fulham's play-off final victories against Aston Villa and Brentford. On 22 September, Kamara after an assist from Facundo Bertoglio, he scored the only goal in a derby game against Panathinaikos. On 24 October 2021, Kamara scored with a penalty and provided two assists in an emphatic 5–1 home win against Panetolikos. On 6 March 2022, he scored in a 2–1 home win game against Olympiacos, breaking their 25-match unbeaten run.

=== Olympiacos ===
On 28 June 2022, Kamara joined Greek champions Olympiacos on a three-year deal.

=== Al Jazira ===
On 29 September 2023 he signed with Emirati club Al-Jazira.

=== Kanchanaburi Power ===
On 1 August 2025, Kamara joined newly-promoted Thai League 1 club Kanchanaburi Power.

=== Negeri Sembilan ===
On 14 October 2026, Negeri Sembilan announced Kamara as their new player for 2026–27 season.

== International career ==
He made his debut for Mauritania on 26 March 2021 in a 2021 Africa Cup of Nations qualifying match against Morocco.

After a 0–0 draw against Morocco in his first selection, he scored his first goal in his second selection against the Central African Republic, qualifying at the same time for the next Africa Cup of Nations. He competed in his first international competition at the 2021 Africa Cup of Nations.

In December 2023, he was selected from the list of 25 Mauritanian players selected by Amir Abdou to compete in the 2023 Africa Cup of Nations.

== Personal life ==
Born in France, Kamara represents Mauritania at international level. He is also of Senegalese descent.

He is a Muslim and fasted for Ramadan even before starting the 2018 Championship play-off final for Fulham.

On 16 January 2024, an error by uploading CAF team on X (formerly Twitter) accidentally revealed his nickname "AK.47", a reference to the initial number he wore at Fulham, which caused a lot of confusion and humorous responses from fans.

== Career statistics ==
=== Club ===
As of 5 June 2023

Appearances and goals by club, season and competition
Club	Season	League			National Cup		League Cup		Continental		Other		Total	
Club	Season	Division	Apps	Goals	Apps	Goals	Apps	Goals	Apps	Goals	Apps	Goals	Apps	Goals
Monaco	2014–15	Ligue 1	2	0	—		—		—		—		2	0
Kortrijk	2015–16	Belgian Pro League	12	0	0	0	—		—		—		12	0
Amiens	2015–16	Championnat National	16	5	—		—		—		—		16	5
Amiens	2016–17	Ligue 2	29	11	0	0	0	0	—		—		29	11
Amiens	Total		45	16	0	0	0	0	—		—		45	16
Fulham	2017–18	Championship	32	7	1	0	2	0	—		—		35	7
Fulham	2018–19	Premier League	13	3	0	0	2	2	—		—		15	5
Fulham	2019–20	Championship	28	4	0	0	1	0	—		—		29	4
Fulham	2020–21	Premier League	11	0	1	0	2	1	—		—		14	1
Fulham	2021–22	Championship	1	0	—		—		—		—		1	0
Fulham	Total		85	14	2	0	7	3	—		—		94	17
Yeni Malatyaspor (loan)	2018–19	Süper Lig	10	1	3	0	—		—		—		13	1
Dijon (loan)	2020–21	Ligue 1	10	1	1	0	—		—		—		11	1
Aris	2021–22	Super League Greece	32	8	3	2	—		—		—		35	10
Olympiacos	2022–23	Super League Greece	1	0	0	0	—		5	0	—		6	0
Aris (loan)	2022–23	Super League Greece	14	4	2	0	—		—		—		16	4
Career total			211	57	11	2	7	3	6	0	0	0	234	62

=== International goals ===
Scores and results list Mauritania's goal tally first.

No.	Date	Venue	Opponent	Score	Result	Competition
1.	30 March 2021	Barthélemy Boganda Stadium, Bangui, Central African Republic	Central African Republic	1–0	1–0	2021 Africa Cup of Nations qualification
2.	16 November 2021	Stade Olympique, Nouakchott, Mauritania	Equatorial Guinea	1–0	1–1	2022 FIFA World Cup qualification
3.	29 March 2022	Stade Cheikha Ould Boïdiya, Nouakchott, Mauritania	Libya	1–0	2–0	Friendly
4.	4 June 2022	Stade Olympique, Nouakchott, Mauritania	Sudan	1–0	3–0	2023 Africa Cup of Nations qualification
5.	4 June 2022	Stade Olympique, Nouakchott, Mauritania	Sudan	2–0	3–0	2023 Africa Cup of Nations qualification
6.	24 September 2022	Stade El Bachir, Mohammedia, Morocco	Benin	1–0	1–0	Friendly
7.	27 September 2022	Stade El Bachir, Mohammedia, Morocco	Congo	2–0	2–0	Friendly

== Honours ==
Fulham

- EFL Championship play-offs: 2018, 2020
