= Loide Augusto =

Angolan footballer

Personal information
- Full name: Loide Antônio Augusto
- Date of birth: 26 February 2000 (age 26)
- Place of birth: Luanda, Angola
- Height: 1.80 m (5 ft 11 in)
- Position: Winger

Team information
- Current team: Vasco da Gama
- Number: 45

Youth career
- –2018: Escola de Futebol do Zango
- 2018–2020: Sporting CP

Senior career*
Years	Team	Apps	(Gls)
2020–2021	Sporting CP B	14	(1)
2021–2022	Farense	8	(2)
2022–2023	Mafra	22	(6)
2023–2025	Alanyaspor	44	(5)
2025–	Vasco da Gama	12	(0)
2025–2026	→ Çaykur Rizespor (loan)	21	(3)

International career^{‡}
2021–	Angola	6	(1)
- * Club domestic league appearances and goals as of 17 October 2026 ‡ National team caps and goals as of 25 June 2024

Loide António Augusto (born 26 February 2000) is an Angolan professional footballer who plays as a winger for Campeonato Brasileiro Série A club Vasco da Gama and the Angola national team.

== Club career ==
Born in Luanda, Augusto played youth football for Escola de Futebol do Zango before joining Sporting CP in Portugal in 2018.

On 20 June 2022, Augusto signed a two-year contract with Mafra.

On 4 July 2023, Augusto signed for Süper Lig club Alanyaspor on a four-year contract.

On 27 February 2025, Augusto signed a three-year contract with Vasco da Gama

== International career ==
Augusto made his international debut for Angola on 25 March 2021 in a 1–0 defeat away to Gambia.

== Career statistics ==
Scores and results list Angola's goal tally first.

No.	Date	Venue	Opponent	Score	Result	Competition
1.	29 March 2021	Estádio 11 de Novembro, Luanda, Angola	Gabon	2–0	2–0	2021 Africa Cup of Nations qualification
