= Josete Miranda =

Equatoguinean footballer (born 1998)

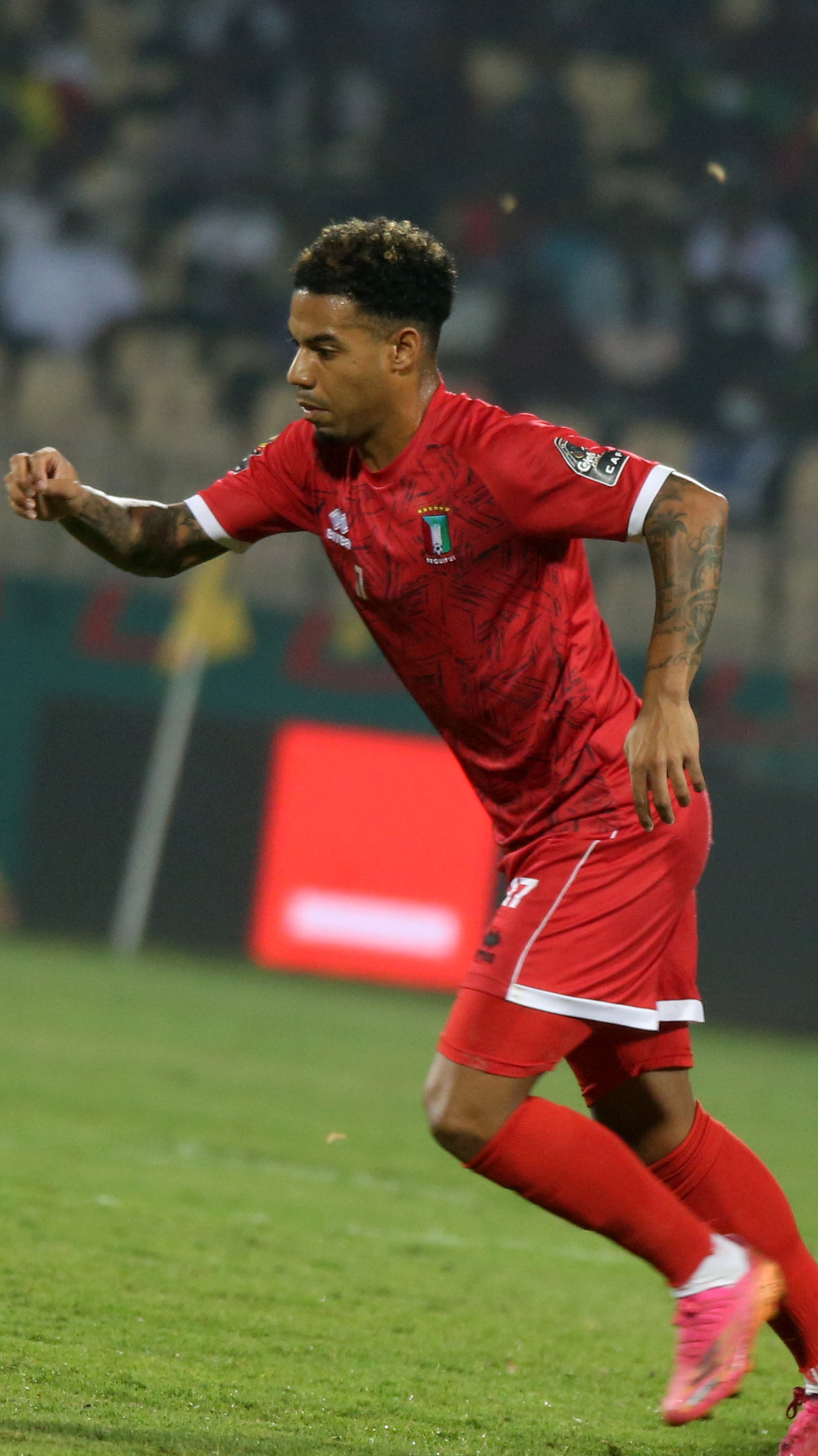
- Miranda with Equatorial Guinea in 2022

Personal information
- Full name: José Antonio Miranda Boacho
- Date of birth: 22 July 1998 (age 28)
- Place of birth: Getafe, Spain
- Height: 1.70 m (5 ft 7 in)
- Position: Forward

Team information
- Current team: Kalamata
- Number: 11

Youth career
- 2007–2009: CD Tetuán
- 2009–2010: Unión Adarve
- 2010–2012: Real Madrid
- 2012–2013: Ciudad de Getafe CF
- 2013–2017: Getafe

Senior career*
Years	Team	Apps	(Gls)
2015–2021	Getafe B	125	(22)
2021–2022	Getafe	4	(0)
2021–2022	→ Niki Volos (loan)	19	(4)
2022–2024	Niki Volos	36	(15)
2024–2025	Iraklis	17	(7)
2025–	Kalamata	18	(5)

International career^{‡}
2015–	Equatorial Guinea	51	(5)
- * Club domestic league appearances and goals as of 2 April 2026 ‡ National team caps and goals as of 25 March 2026

José Antonio Miranda Boacho (born 22 July 1998), known as Josete Miranda or simply Josete, is a professional footballer who plays as a forward for Super League Greece club Kalamata. Born in Spain, he plays for the Equatorial Guinea national team.

== Club career ==
Born in Getafe, Community of Madrid, Josete joined Getafe CF's youth setup in 2012, aged 14, after a stint at Real Madrid. In late January 2015 he was called up by manager Pablo Franco to the reserves, being also included on the bench in a 4–3 home win against UD Las Palmas Atlético.

On 8 February 2015, aged only 16, Josete made his senior debut, coming on as a late substitute in a 2–0 away win against UB Conquense in the Segunda División B championship.

On 13 August 2024, Josete signed a contract with Iraklis Thessaloniki.

On 4 July 2025, Miranda signed a two-year contract with Kalamata.

== International career ==
A son of an Equatoguinean mother, Josete was called up for Equatorial Guinea national team on 25 March 2015. He made his full international debut on the following day, coming on as a second-half substitute in a 0–2 friendly loss against Egypt. Josete scored the first goal in a 4–0 victory over South Sudan in 2017 Africa Cup of Nations qualifier.

== Career statistics ==
=== Club ===
As of 2 April 2026

Club	Season	League			Cup		Continental		Other		Total	
Club	Season	Division	Apps	Goals	Apps	Goals	Apps	Goals	Apps	Goals	Apps	Goals
Getafe B	2014–15	Segunda División B	1	0	—		—		—		1	0
Getafe B	2015–16	Segunda División B	22	1	—		—		—		22	1
Getafe B	2016–17	Tercera División	17	0	—		—		—		17	0
Getafe B	2017–18	Tercera División	21	7	—		—		—		21	7
Getafe B	2018–19	Tercera División	33	11	—		—		—		33	11
Getafe B	2019–20	Segunda División B	18	2	—		—		—		18	2
Getafe B	2020–21	Segunda División B	15	3	—		—		—		15	3
Getafe B	Total		117	24	—		—		—		117	24
Getafe	2020–21	La Liga	4	0	—		—		—		4	0
Niki Volos (loan)	2021–22	Superleague Greece 2	19	4	4	0	—		—		23	4
Niki Volos	2022–23	Superleague Greece 2	21	8	—		—		—		21	8
Niki Volos	2023–24	Superleague Greece 2	15	7	1	1	—		—		16	8
Niki Volos	Total		36	15	1	1	—		—		37	16
Iraklis	2024–25	Superleague Greece 2	17	7	0	0	—		—		17	7
Kalamata	2025–26	Superleague Greece 2	18	5	0	0	—		—		18	5
Career total			211	55	5	1	0	0	0	0	216	56

=== International goals ===
As of 14 November 2025 (Equatorial Guinea score listed first, score column indicates score after each Miranda goal)

International goals by date, venue, cap, opponent, score, result and competition
No.	Date	Venue	Cap	Opponent	Score	Result	Competition
1	4 September 2016	Estadio de Malabo, Malabo, Equatorial Guinea	9	South Sudan	1–0	4–0	2017 Africa Cup of Nations qualification
2	11 November 2020	Al Salam Stadium, Cairo, Egypt	18	Libya	1–0	3–2	2021 Africa Cup of Nations qualification
3	18 January 2024	Alassane Ouattara Stadium, Abidjan, Ivory Coast	42	Guinea-Bissau	2–1	4–2	2023 Africa Cup of Nations
4	14 November 2025	Arslan Zeki Demirci Sports Complex, Manavgat, Turkey	50	Kenya	1–0	1–0	Friendly
5	25 March 2026	Mardan Sports Complex, Antalya, Turkey	51	Kyrgyzstan	1–0	1–0	Friendly

== Career statistics ==
=== International ===
As of 14 November 2025

Equatorial Guinea
Year	Apps	Goals
2015	8	0
2016	1	1
2018	3	0
2019	5	0
2020	2	1
2021	6	0
2022	8	0
2023	7	0
2024	7	1
2025	3	1
2026	1	1
Total	51	5
