= Salomón Obama =

Equatoguinean footballer (born 2000)

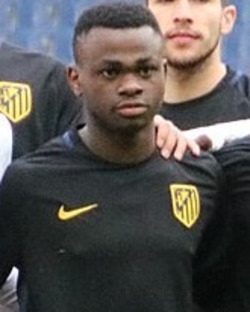
- Omaba in 2017 with Atlético Madrid B

Personal information
- Full name: Salomón Asumu Obama Ondo
- Date of birth: 4 February 2000 (age 26)
- Place of birth: Kie-Ntem, Equatorial Guinea
- Height: 1.76 m (5 ft 9 in)
- Position: Forward

Team information
- Current team: Esperança d'Andorra

Youth career
- 2008–2018: Atlético Madrid
- 2019: Celta Vigo

Senior career*
Years	Team	Apps	(Gls)
2017–2018	Atlético Madrid B	16	(0)
2019–2020	Celta B	1	(0)
2019–2020	→ Mérida (loan)	5	(0)
2020	Dibba Al-Fujairah		
2021	Sevan	1	(0)
2021	Móstoles URJC	3	(0)
2022	UE Santa Coloma	15	(5)
2022–2023	Ethnikos Achna	23	(0)
2023–2024	UE Santa Coloma	24	(7)
2024–2025	Ràngers	15	(3)
2025–2026	Tlaxcala	10	(0)
2026–	Esperança d'Andorra		

International career^{‡}
2017	Spain U17	5	(1)
2018–2019	Equatorial Guinea U-23	3	(1)
2018–	Equatorial Guinea	16	(1)
- * Club domestic league appearances and goals as of 1 November 2025 ‡ National team caps and goals as of 18 January 2024

Salomón Asumu Obama Ondo (born 4 February 2000) is an Equatoguinean professional footballer who plays as a forward for Primera Divisió club Esperança and the Equatorial Guinea national team.

== Professional career ==
Obama moved to Spain at a young age from Equatorial Guinea, and was raised in Torrejón. Salomón joined the youth academy of Atlético Madrid in 2008.

On 31 January 2019, Obama signed for Celta de Vigo, from Atletico Madrid.

Obama signed for Tlaxcala in the Liga de Expansión MX for the Apertura 2025.

== International career ==
Obama, at the age of 18, was called up to the senior Equatorial Guinea national football team in August 2018. He previously played for the Spain under-17 team as he also holds Spanish citizenship.

He made his national team debut as a substitute against Sudan in the 2019 Africa Cup of Nations qualification.

=== International goals ===
Scores and results list Equatorial Guinea's goal tally first.

No.	Date	Venue	Opponent	Score	Result	Competition
1.	11 November 2020	Al Salam Stadium, Cairo, Egypt	Libya	3–2	3–2	2021 Africa Cup of Nations qualification

== Personal life ==
Obama's twin brother, Federico, is also a footballer and last played for Primera Divisió club Penya Encarnada d'Andorra as a full-back.
