= Mamadou Niass =

Mauritanian association football player

Personal information
- Full name: Mamadou Ndioko Niass
- Date of birth: 4 June 1994 (age 32)
- Place of birth: Assaba Region, Mauritania
- Height: 1.75 m (5 ft 9 in)
- Position: Forward

Team information
- Current team: Al-Wehdat
- Number: 20

Senior career*
Years	Team	Apps	(Gls)
2012–2015	ASAC Concorde		(15+)
2015–2016	FC Nouadhibou		(10)
2016–2019	Salam Zgharta	61	(21)
2019–2021	El Entag El Harby	51	(6)
2021–2024	Al-Mokawoloon Al-Arab	84	(11)
2024–2025	Al Ahed	1	(0)
2025	Al-Salt	11	(6)
2025–	Al-Wehdat	0	(0)

International career^{‡}
2013–	Mauritania	24	(2)
- * Club domestic league appearances and goals as of 23:44, 19 November 2019 (UTC) ‡ National team caps and goals as of 22 March 2019

Mamadou Ndioko Niass (born 4 June 1994) is a Mauritanian professional footballer who played as a forward for Jordanian Pro League club Al-Wehdat and the Mauritania national team.

== International career ==
=== International goals ===
Scores and results list Mauritania's goal tally first.

Goal	Date	Venue	Opponent	Score	Result	Competition
1.	31 March 2015	Stade Olympique, Nouakchott	Niger	2–0	2–0	Friendly
2.	24 October 2015	Stade Olympique, Nouakchott	Mali	1–0	1–0	2016 African Nations Championship qualification
3.	15 November 2020	Prince Louis Rwagasore Stadium, Bujumbura	Burundi	1–1	1–3	2021 Africa Cup of Nations qualification
4.	3 September 2021	Stade Olympique, Nouakchott	Zambia	1–2	1–2	2022 FIFA World Cup qualification
