= Kwame Quee =

Footballer

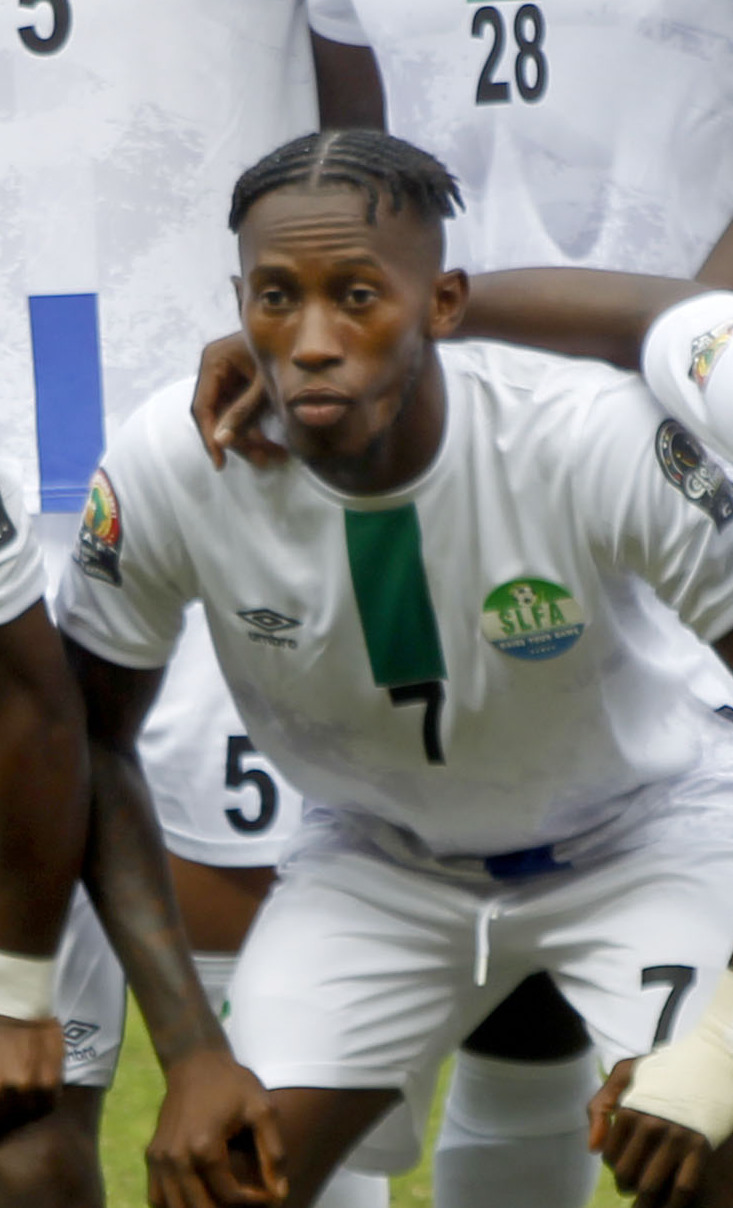
- Quee with Sierra Leone at the 2021 Africa Cup of Nations

Personal information
- Date of birth: 7 September 1996 (age 30)
- Place of birth: Freetown, Sierra Leone
- Height: 1.85 m (6 ft 1 in)
- Position: Midfielder

Team information
- Current team: Víkingur Ó.

Youth career
- 2009–2011: FC Johansen

Senior career*
Years	Team	Apps	(Gls)
2011–2019	FC Johansen	35	(20)
2017–2019	→ Víkingur Ólafsvík (loan)	36	(14)
2019–2020	Breiðablik	11	(2)
2019	→ Víkingur Reykjavík (loan)	12	(5)
2020	→ Víkingur Reykjavík (loan)	11	(6)
2021–2022	Víkingur Reykjavík	15	(3)
2022	Najran	11	(5)
2022–2023	Hapoel Haifa	18	(1)
2023–2024	Old Edwardians		
2024	Grindavík	17	(5)
2025-	Víkingur Ó.	11	(5)

International career^{‡}
2014	Sierra Leone U20	4	(0)
2015	Sierra Leone U23	4	(0)
2012–	Sierra Leone	34	(3)
- * Club domestic league appearances and goals as of 2 November 2024 ‡ National team caps and goals as of 20:00, 6 January 2024 (UTC)

Kwame Quee (born 7 September 1996) is a Sierra Leonean professional footballer who plays as a midfielder for 2. deild karla club Víkingur Ólafsvík and the Sierra Leone national team.

== Club career ==
In June 2016, Quee underwent a three-week trial with Danish side Randers FC, along with three other teammates from Johansen.

In May 2017, Quee was loaned out to Icelandic club Víkingur Ólafsvík on a two-year deal. He made his debut on 15 May against Grindavík, although he was sent off in the 82nd minute after seeing his second yellow card of the match. His first goal with Víkingur came in his third game, where he flicked in a header from close range against Breiðablik. He scored his second goal the following month, during a 2–1 win against Stjarnan.

In January 2019 Quee signed for Icelandic top flight club Breiðablik. After just two appearances with the club, he was loaned out to Víkingur Reykjavík in June. He won the 2019 Icelandic Cup with Víkingur. On 2 March 2022, Quee signed for Saudi club Najran.

On 1 June 2022, he signed for Israeli Premier League club Hapoel Haifa.

== International career ==
A former youth international, Quee represented his country at the 2015 African U-20 Championship qualifiers as well as the 2015 Africa U-23 Cup of Nations qualifiers.

Quee received his first senior call-up to the national team in July 2014 in preparation for the 2015 Africa Cup of Nations qualifiers. On 19 July, he earned his first cap, replacing Mohamed Kamanor during a 2–0 win against Seychelles, which secured them a spot in the group stage.

== Career statistics ==
Scores and results list Sierra Leone's goal tally first.

No.	Date	Venue	Opponent	Score	Result	Competition
1.	4 September 2019	SKD Stadium, Monrovia, Liberia	Liberia	1–1	1–3	2022 FIFA World Cup qualification
2.	13 November 2019	National Stadium, Freetown, Sierra Leone	Lesotho	1–0	1–1	2021 Africa Cup of Nations qualification
3.	13 November 2020	Samuel Ogbemudia Stadium, Benin City, Nigeria	Nigeria	1–4	4–4	2021 Africa Cup of Nations qualification

== Honours ==
Víkingur FC

- Icelandic Cup: 2019, 2021
- Icelandic Premier Division: 2021
