= Halid Lwaliwa =

Ugandan footballer (born 1996)

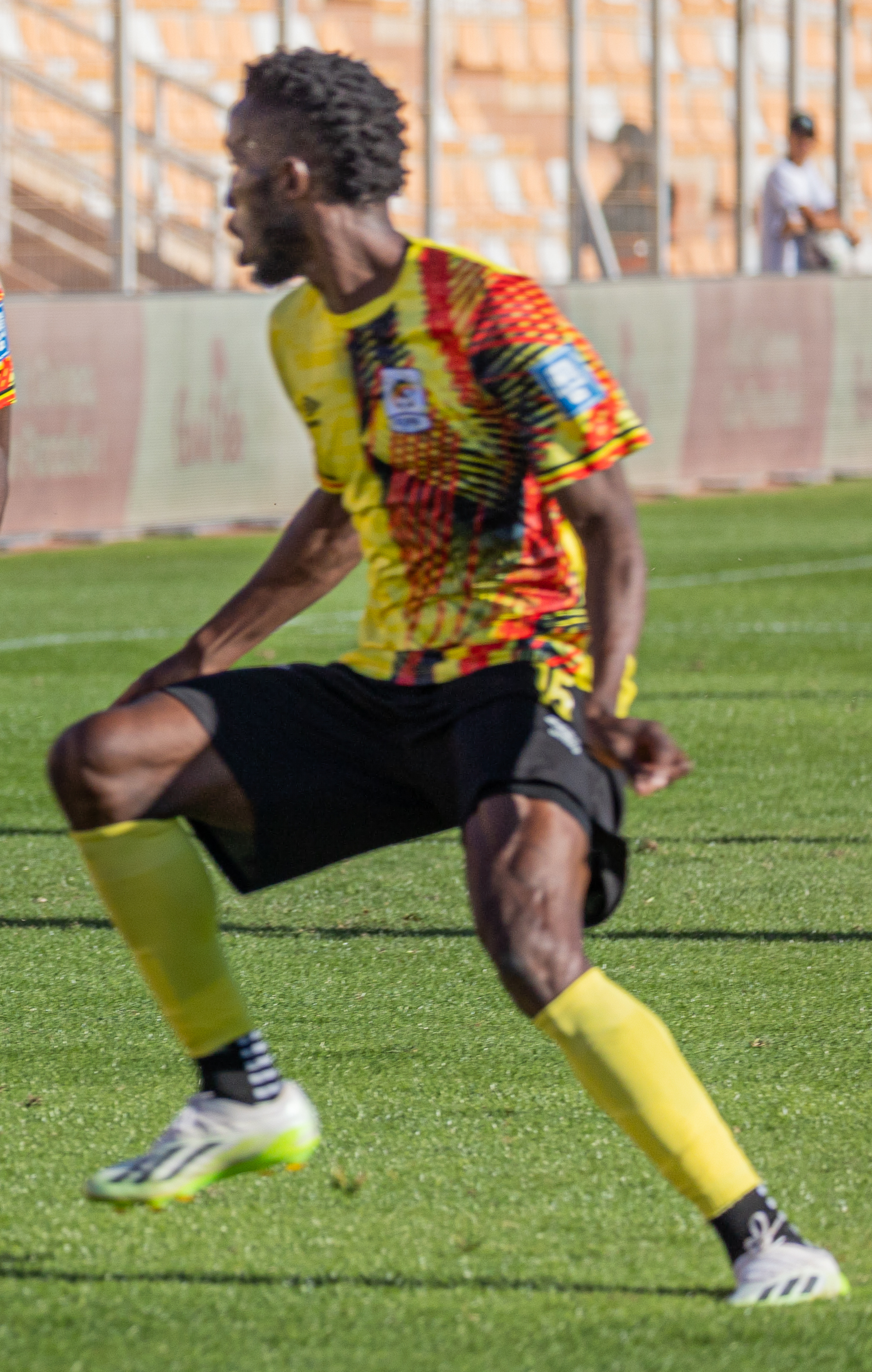
- Lwaliwa playing for Uganda in 2023

Personal information
- Full name: Halid Lwaliwa
- Date of birth: 22 August 1996 (age 30)
- Place of birth: Iganga, Uganda
- Height: 1.75 m (5 ft 9 in)
- Position: Centre-back

Team information
- Current team: Al-Ain
- Number: 21

Senior career*
Years	Team	Apps	(Gls)
2014–2022	Vipers SC	34+	(1+)
2022–2024	Bregalnica Štip	51	(0)
2024–	Al-Ain	0	(0)

International career^{‡}
2019–	Uganda	24	(1)
- * Club domestic league appearances and goals as of 1 June 2024 ‡ National team caps and goals as of 21:37, 17 April 2023 (UTC)

Halid Lwaliwa (born 22 August 1996) is a Ugandan professional footballer who plays as a centre-back for Saudi First Division League club Al-Ain and the Uganda national team.

== Club career ==
Born in Iganga, Lwaliwa attended St. Mary's Boarding Secondary School in Kitende before starting his footballing career at Vipers SC where he was promoted to the senior side in 2014. He signed a contract extension in August 2018. In 2022, Halid joined FK Bregalnica Strip in North Macedonia.

On 15 August 2024, Lwaliwa joined Saudi Arabian club Al-Ain.

== International career ==
He made his international debut on 21 September 2019 in a 3–0 win over Burundi at the 2020 African Nations Championship qualification.
