= Masoabi Nkoto =

Mosotho footballer (born 1992)

Personal information
- Full name: Masoabi Synous Nkoto
- Date of birth: 14 January 1992 (age 34)
- Place of birth: Maseru, Lesotho
- Height: 1.82 m (6 ft 0 in)
- Position: Forward

Team information
- Current team: KF Mitrovica
- Number: 19

Senior career*
Years	Team	Apps	(Gls)
2013–2017	Lioli	28	(22)
2017–2018	Kick 4 Life	25	(16)
2018–2020	Real Kings	30	(25)
2020	Lioli	10	(7)
2021	Asswehly	25	(18)
2021–2022	Merani Martvili	15	(8)
2023–2025	Jawalakhel	26	(16)
2023	PSDS Deli Serdang	5	(2)
2025/26	Lioli FC		(9)
2026–	Mitrovica	0	(0)

International career^{‡}
2014–	Lesotho	34	(12)
- * Club domestic league appearances and goals as of 13 September 2025 ‡ National team caps and goals as of 9 June 2022

Masoabi Synous Nkoto (born 14 January 1992) is a Mosotho professional footballer who currently plays as a forward for KF-Fc Mitrovica in Kosovo Liga e pare

== Club career ==
=== Jawalakhel ===
In March 2023, it was announced that Masoabi joined Martyr's Memorial A-Division League Nepalese club Jawalakhel until end of the season.

=== PSDS Deli Serdang ===
In September 2023, Masoabi signed a contract with Indonesian club PSDS Deli Serdang.
