= Djibouti national football team results =

The Djibouti national football team is the association football team of Djibouti. It is controlled by the Djiboutian Football Federation, and is a member of the Confederation of African Football (CAF) and the Union of Arab Football Associations (UAFA).

== Results ==
| Date | Venue | Opponent | Score | Competition | Djibouti scorers |
|---|---|---|---|---|---|
| 27 November 1994 | Nairobi | Kenya | 1–4 | Friendly | |
| 30 November 1994 | Nairobi | Somalia | 1–2 | Friendly | |
| 2 December 1994 | Nairobi | Tanzania | 0–3 | Friendly | |
| 15 January 1995 | Bujumbura | Burundi | 0–0 | | |
| 28 January 1995 | Stade du Ville, Djibouti | Burundi | 0–0 | | |
| 30 July 1998 | Stade du Ville, Djibouti | Kenya | 0–3 | | |
| 14 August 1998 | Nairobi | Kenya | 1–9 | | |
| 7 April 2000 | Stade du Ville, Djibouti | (Democratic Republic of the Congo) Congo DR | 1–1 | 2002 FIFA World Cup qualification – CAF first round | Khaireh 39' |
| 23 April 2000 | Kinshasa | (Democratic Republic of the Congo) Congo DR | 1–9 | 2002 FIFA World Cup qualification – CAF first round | Robleh 29' |
| 7 February 2008 | Stade du Ville, Djibouti | (Malta) Melita F.C. | 2–2 | Friendly | |
| 31 May 2008 | Blantyre | Malawi | 1–8 | 2010 FIFA World Cup qualification – CAF second round | Daher 23' |
| 6 June 2008 | Stade du Ville, Djibouti | Egypt | 0–4 | 2010 FIFA World Cup qualification - CAF second round | |
| 13 June 2008 | Stade du Ville, Djibouti | (Democratic Republic of the Congo) Congo DR | 0–6 | 2010 FIFA World Cup qualification – CAF second round | |
| 22 June 2008 | Kinshasa | (Democratic Republic of the Congo) Congo DR | 1–5 | 2010 FIFA World Cup qualification – CAF second round | Hirir 85' |
| 5 September 2008 | Stade du Ville, Djibouti | Malawi | 0–3 | 2010 FIFA World Cup qualification – CAF second round | |
| 12 October 2008 | Cairo | Egypt | 0–4 | 2010 FIFA World Cup qualification – CAF second round | |
| 23 December 2008 | Stade du Ville, Djibouti | Somalia | 2–3 | Friendly | |
| 31 December 2008 | Jinja | Zambia | 0–3 | Friendly | |
| 2 January 2009 | Jinja | Burundi | 0–4 | 2008 CECAFA Cup | |
| 4 January 2009 | Jinja | Sudan | 1–1 | 2008 CECAFA Cup | Daher 52' |
| 6 January 2009 | Jinja | Kenya | 1–5 | 2008 CECAFA Cup | Daher 60' |
| 28 November 2009 | Nairobi | Ethiopia | 0–5 | 2009 CECAFA Cup | |
| 2 December 2009 | Nairobi | Kenya | 0–2 | 2009 CECAFA Cup | |
| 4 December 2009 | Nairobi | Zambia | 0–6 | 2009 CECAFA Cup | |
| 31 October 2011 | Stade du Ville, Djibouti | Somalia | 1–0 | Friendly | |
| 11 November 2011 | Stade du Ville, Djibouti | Namibia | 0–4 | 2014 FIFA World Cup qualification – CAF first round | |
| 15 November 2011 | Windhoek | Namibia | 0–4 | 2014 FIFA World Cup qualification – CAF first round | |
| 27 November 2011 | Dar es Salaam | Zimbabwe | 0–2 | 2011 CECAFA Cup | |
| 29 November 2011 | Dar es Salaam | Tanzania | 0–3 | 2011 CECAFA Cup | |
| 2 December 2011 | Dar es Salaam | Rwanda | 2–5 | 2011 CECAFA Cup | Daoud 25', 34' |
| 12 June 2015 | Salle Omnisport de Radès, Radès | Tunisia | 1–8 | 2017 Africa Cup of Nations qualification | Liban 54' |
| 21 June 2015 | Stade du Ville, Djibouti | Burundi | 1–2 | Friendly | |
| 4 July 2015 | Bujumbura | Burundi | 0–2 | Friendly | |
| 4 September 2015 | Stade du Ville, Djibouti | Togo | 0–2 | 2017 Africa Cup of Nations qualification | |
| 9 October 2015 | Stade du Ville, Djibouti | Swaziland | 0–6 | 2018 FIFA World Cup qualification – CAF first round | |
| 17 October 2015 | Somhlolo National Stadium, Lobamba | Swaziland | 1–2 | 2018 FIFA World Cup qualification – CAF first round | Liban 21' |
| 23 November 2015 | Bahir Dar Stadium, Bahir Dar | South Sudan | 0–2 | 2015 CECAFA Cup | |
| 25 November 2015 | Bahir Dar Stadium, Bahir Dar | Malawi | 0–3 | 2015 CECAFA Cup | |
| 27 November 2015 | Bahir Dar Stadium, Bahir Dar | Sudan | 0–4 | 2015 CECAFA Cup | |
| 24 March 2016 | Stade du Ville, Djibouti | Liberia | 0–1 | 2017 Africa Cup of Nations qualification | |
| 29 March 2016 | Antoinette Tubman Stadium, Monrovia | Liberia | 0–5 | 2017 Africa Cup of Nations qualification | |
| 3 June 2016 | Stade du Ville, Djibouti | Tunisia | 0–3 | 2017 Africa Cup of Nations qualification | |
| 4 September 2016 | Stade de Kégué, Lomé | Togo | 0–5 | 2017 Africa Cup of Nations qualification | |
| 10 March 2017 | Bujumbura | Burundi | 0–7 | Friendly | |
| 13 March 2017 | Bujumbura | Burundi | 0–1 | Friendly | |
| 22 March 2017 | Stade du Ville, Djibouti | South Sudan | 2–0 | 2019 Africa Cup of Nations qualification | Hamza 56', Breik 65' |
| 28 March 2017 | Juba Stadium, Juba | South Sudan | 0–6 | 2019 Africa Cup of Nations qualification | |
| 15 July 2017 | El Hadj Hassan Gouled Aptidon Stadium, Djibouti City | Ethiopia | 1–5 | 2018 African Nations Championship qualification | |
| 26 July 2019 | El Hadj Hassan Gouled Aptidon Stadium, Djibouti City | Ethiopia | 0–1 | 2020 African Nations Championship qualification | |
| 4 August 2019 | Dire Dawa Stadium, Dire Dawa | Ethiopia | 3–4 | 2020 African Nations Championship qualification | Ahmed 40' Robleh 52'; Mahabeh 58' |
| 4 September 2019 | El Hadj Hassan Gouled Aptidon Stadium, Djibouti City | Eswatini | 2–1 | 2022 FIFA World Cup qualification – CAF first round | Mahabeh 45+4' (pen.), Hamza 74' |
| 10 September 2019 | Mavuso Sports Centre, Manzini | Eswatini | 0–0 | 2022 FIFA World Cup qualification – CAF first round | |
| 9 October 2019 | El Hadj Hassan Gouled Aptidon Stadium, Djibouti City | Gambia | 1–1 | 2021 Africa Cup of Nations qualification | Mbye 59' (o.g.) |
| 13 October 2019 | Independence Stadium, Bakau | Gambia | 1–1 | 2021 Africa Cup of Nations qualification | Mahabeh 10' (pen.) |
| 7 December 2019 | Lugogo Stadium, Kampala | Somalia | 0–0 | 2019 CECAFA Cup | |
| 11 December 2019 | Lugogo Stadium, Kampala | Burundi | 2–1 | 2019 CECAFA Cup | Mahabeh 10', 70' (pen.) |
| 13 December 2019 | Lugogo Stadium, Kampala | Eritrea | 0–3 | 2019 CECAFA Cup | |
| 15 December 2019 | Lugogo Stadium, Kampala | Uganda | 1–4 | 2019 CECAFA Cup | Mohamed 69' |

== See also ==
- Football in Djibouti
- Djiboutian Football Federation
- Djibouti Premier League
- Djibouti Cup
- Stade du Ville
