= 2022 FIFA World Cup qualification – CAF first round =

The CAF first round of 2022 FIFA World Cup qualification was played from 4 to 10 September 2019.

== Format ==
A total of 28 teams (teams ranked 27–54 in the CAF entrant list) played home-and-away over two legs. The 14 winners advanced to the second round.

== Seeding ==
The draw for the first round was held on 29 July 2019 at 12:00 EST (UTC+2), at the CAF headquarters in Cairo, Egypt.

The seeding was based on the FIFA World Rankings of July 2019 (shown in parentheses below). Teams from Pot 2 hosted the first leg, while teams from Pot 1 hosted the second leg.

Note: Bolded teams qualified for the second round.

Pot 1	Pot 2
1. **Zimbabwe** (112); 2. Sierra Leone (114); 3. **Mozambique** (116); 4. **Namibia** (121); 5. **Angola** (122); 6. **Guinea-Bissau** (123); 7. **Malawi** (126); 8. **Togo** (128); 9. **Sudan** (129); 10. **Rwanda** (133); 11. **Tanzania** (137); 12. **Equatorial Guinea** (139); 13. Eswatini (139); 14. Lesotho (144)	15. Comoros (146); 16. Botswana (147); 17. Burundi (148); 18. **Ethiopia** (150); 19. **Liberia** (152); 20. Mauritius (157); 21. Gambia (161); 22. South Sudan (169); 23. Chad (175); 24. São Tomé and Príncipe (185); 25. Seychelles (192); 26. **Djibouti** (195); 27. Somalia (202); 28. Eritrea (202)

== Summary ==
The first legs were played on 4–7 September, and the second legs on 8 and 10 September 2019.

Team 1	Agg.	Team 2	1st leg	2nd leg
**Ethiopia**	1–1 (a)	Lesotho	0–0	1–1
Somalia	2–3	**Zimbabwe**	1–0	1–3
Eritrea	1–4	**Namibia**	1–2	0–2
Burundi	2–2 (0–3 p)	**Tanzania**	1–1	1–1 (a.e.t.)
**Djibouti**	2–1	Eswatini	2–1	0–0
Botswana	0–1	**Malawi**	0–0	0–1
Gambia	1–3	**Angola**	0–1	1–2
**Liberia**	3–2	Sierra Leone	3–1	0–1
Mauritius	0–3	**Mozambique**	0–1	0–2
São Tomé and Príncipe	1–3	**Guinea-Bissau**	0–1	1–2
South Sudan	1–2	**Equatorial Guinea**	1–1	0–1
Comoros	1–3	**Togo**	1–1	0–2
Chad	1–3	**Sudan**	1–3	0–0
Seychelles	0–10	**Rwanda**	0–3	0–7

== Matches ==
4 September 2019
16:00 UTC+3

Ethiopia	0–0	Lesotho
	Report

Bahir Dar Stadium, Bahir Dar
Attendance: 48,000
Referee: Mohamed Maarouf (Egypt)
8 September 2019
15:00 UTC+2

Lesotho	1–1	Ethiopia
Seturumane 56'	Report	Lerotholi 50' (o.g.)

Setsoto Stadium, Maseru
Attendance: 15,000
Referee: Messie Nkounkou (Congo)

1–1 on aggregate. Ethiopia won on away goals and advanced to second round.

5 September 2019
18:00 UTC+3

Somalia	1–0	Zimbabwe
Shakunda 86'	Report

El Hadj Hassan Gouled Aptidon Stadium, Djibouti (Djibouti) (Note: Somalia played their home match in Djibouti due to security concerns from the ongoing civil war.)
Attendance: 4,000
Referee: Alfred Pousri Armi (Chad)
10 September 2019
15:00 UTC+2

Zimbabwe	3–1	Somalia
Munetsi 77'; Muskwe 86'; Billiat 90'	Report	O. Mohamed 85'

National Sports Stadium, Harare
Attendance: 13,000
Referee: Andofetra Rakotojaona (Madagascar)

Zimbabwe won 3–2 on aggregate and advanced to second round.

4 September 2019
16:00 UTC+3

Eritrea	1–2	Namibia
Sulieman 65'	Report	Shalulile 50'; E. Tesfay 58' (o.g.)

Denden Stadium, Asmara
Attendance: 20,000
Referee: Mohamed Ali Moussa (Niger)
10 September 2019
19:00 UTC+2

Namibia	2–0	Eritrea
Iimbondi 25'; Shalulile 90+2'	Report

Sam Nujoma Stadium, Windhoek
Attendance: 4,200
Referee: Roland Danon (Ivory Coast)

Namibia won 4–1 on aggregate and advanced to second round.

4 September 2019
15:00 UTC+2

Burundi	1–1	Tanzania
C. Amissi 81'	Report	Msuva 85'

Prince Louis Rwagasore Stadium, Bujumbura
Attendance: 22,000
Referee: Kokou Ntalé (Togo)
8 September 2019
16:00 UTC+3

Tanzania	1–1 (a.e.t.)	Burundi
Samatta 29'	Report	Abdul Razak 45+2'
Penalties
Nyoni (penalty scored); Mao (penalty scored); Kamagi (penalty scored)	3–0	(penalty missed) Ngandu; (penalty missed) Berahino; (penalty missed) Bigirimana

National Stadium, Dar es Salaam
Attendance: 55,000
Referee: Norman Matemera (Zimbabwe)

2–2 on aggregate. Tanzania won 3–0 on penalties and advanced to second round.

4 September 2019
18:00 UTC+3

Djibouti	2–1	Eswatini
Mahabeh 45+4' (pen.); Hamza 74'	Report	S. Mamba 56'

El Hadj Hassan Gouled Aptidon Stadium, Djibouti
Attendance: 10,000
Referee: Slim Belakhouas (Tunisia)
10 September 2019
15:00 UTC+2

Eswatini	0–0	Djibouti
	Report

Mavuso Sports Centre, Manzini
Attendance: 1,500
Referee: Beida Dahane (Mauritania)

Djibouti won 2–1 on aggregate and advanced to second round.

7 September 2019
16:00 UTC+2

Botswana	0–0	Malawi
	Report

Francistown Stadium, Francistown
Attendance: 14,000
Referee: Anthony Ogwayo (Kenya)
10 September 2019
14:00 UTC+2

Malawi	1–0	Botswana
Phiri 81' (pen.)	Report

Kamuzu Stadium, Blantyre
Attendance: 23,700
Referee: Souleiman Djama (Djibouti)

Malawi won 1–0 on aggregate and advanced to second round.

6 September 2019
17:00 UTC+0

Gambia	0–1	Angola
	Report	Gaspar 31'

Independence Stadium, Bakau
Attendance: 21,000
Referee: Quadri Adebimpe (Nigeria)
10 September 2019
16:00 UTC+1

Angola	2–1	Gambia
Geraldo 41'; Abreu 68'	Report	Ceesay 65'

Estádio 11 de Novembro, Luanda
Attendance: 17,000
Referee: Jean-Marc Ganamandji (Central African Republic)

Angola won 3–1 on aggregate and advanced to second round.

4 September 2019
18:00 UTC+0

Liberia	3–1	Sierra Leone
Te. Tisdell 18' (pen.); Sangare 82' (pen.); Johnson 88'	Report	Quee 56'

Samuel Kanyon Doe Sports Complex, Paynesville
Attendance: 40,000
Referee: Louis Houngnandande (Benin)
8 September 2019
16:30 UTC+0

Sierra Leone	1–0	Liberia
K. Kamara 55'	Report

Siaka Stevens Stadium, Freetown
Attendance: 43,000
Referee: Jean Ouattara (Burkina Faso)

Liberia won 3–2 on aggregate and advanced to second round.

4 September 2019
18:30 UTC+4

Mauritius	0–1	Mozambique
	Report	Telinho 10'

Stade Anjalay, Belle Vue
Attendance: 5,700
Referee: Georges Gatogato (Burundi)
10 September 2019
16:00 UTC+2

Mozambique	2–0	Mauritius
Clésio 6'; Catamo 77' (pen.)	Report

Estádio do Zimpeto, Maputo
Attendance: 1,900
Referee: Brian Miiro (Uganda)

Mozambique won 3–0 on aggregate and advanced to second round.

4 September 2019
15:30 UTC+0

São Tomé and Príncipe	0–1	Guinea-Bissau
	Report	Jos. Mendes 85' (pen.)

Estádio Nacional 12 de Julho, São Tomé
Attendance: 4,000
Referee: João Goma (Angola)
10 September 2019
16:30 UTC+0

Guinea-Bissau	2–1	São Tomé and Príncipe
Jos. Mendes 66', 77'	Report	Iniesta 12'

Estádio 24 de Setembro, Bissau
Attendance: 20,000
Referee: Daudu Williams (Sierra Leone)

Guinea-Bissau won 3–1 on aggregate and advanced to second round.

4 September 2019
16:00 UTC+2

South Sudan	1–1	Equatorial Guinea
Kata 75' (o.g.)	Report	Meseguer 34'

Al-Hilal Stadium, Omdurman (Sudan) (Note: South Sudan played their home match in Sudan due to their national stadium currently undergoing renovations.)
Attendance: 2,000
Referee: Abdulwahid Huraywidah (Libya)
8 September 2019
17:00 UTC+1

Equatorial Guinea	1–0	South Sudan
Nsue 72'	Report

Estadio de Malabo, Malabo
Attendance: 6,700
Referee: Mahmood Ali Ismail (Sudan)

Equatorial Guinea won 2–1 on aggregate and advanced to second round.

6 September 2019
15:00 UTC+3

Comoros	1–1	Togo
Djoudja 49'	Report	Laba 34'

Stade de Moroni, Moroni
Attendance: 3,000
Referee: Elly Sasii (Tanzania)
10 September 2019
16:00 UTC+0

Togo	2–0	Comoros
M'Dahoma 10' (o.g.); Sunu 71'	Report

Stade de Kégué, Lomé
Attendance: 25,000
Referee: Pierre Atcho (Gabon)

Togo won 3–1 on aggregate and advanced to second round.

5 September 2019
15:30 UTC+1

Chad	1–3	Sudan
N'Douassel 85' (pen.)	Report	Ramadan 13', 67', 74'

Stade Omnisports Idriss Mahamat Ouya, N'Djamena
Attendance: 30,000
Referee: Bangaly Konate (Guinea)
10 September 2019
19:00 UTC+2

Sudan	0–0	Chad
	Report

Al-Merrikh Stadium, Omdurman
Attendance: 17,500
Referee: Nelson Fred (Seychelles)

Sudan won 3–1 on aggregate and advanced to second round.

5 September 2019
16:00 UTC+4

Seychelles	0–3	Rwanda
	Report	Hakizimana 32'; Mukunzi 36'; Kagere 80'

Stade Linité, Victoria
Attendance: 1,300
Referee: Belay Tadesse (Ethiopia)
10 September 2019
18:00 UTC+2

Rwanda	7–0	Seychelles
Bizimana 16'; Kagere 27', 51'; Tuyisenge 29', 34'; Mukunzi 57'; Hakizimana 79'	Report

Stade Régional Nyamirambo, Kigali
Attendance: 20,000
Referee: Tsegay Mogos (Eritrea)

Rwanda won 10–0 on aggregate and advanced to second round.

== Goalscorers ==
There were 57 goals scored in 28 matches, for an average of 2.04 goals per match.

3 goals

- (Guinea-Bissau national football team) Joseph Mendes
- (Rwanda national football team) Meddie Kagere
- (Sudan national football team) Ramadan Agab

2 goals

- (Namibia national football team) Peter Shalulile
- (Rwanda national football team) Muhadjiri Hakizimana
- (Rwanda national football team) Yannick Mukunzi
- (Rwanda national football team) Jacques Tuyisenge

1 goal

- (Angola national football team) Fábio Abreu
- (Angola national football team) Wilson Gaspar
- (Angola national football team) Geraldo
- (Burundi national football team) Fiston Abdul Razak
- (Burundi national football team) Cédric Amissi
- (Chad national football team) Ezechiel N'Douassel
- (Comoros national football team) Ibroihim Djoudja
- (Djibouti national football team) Hamza Abdi Idleh
- (Djibouti national football team) Mahdi Houssein Mahabeh
- (Equatorial Guinea national football team) Luis Meseguer
- (Equatorial Guinea national football team) Emilio Nsue
- (Eritrea national football team) Ali Sulieman
- (Eswatini national football team) Siboniso Mamba
- (Gambia national football team) Assan Ceesay
- (Lesotho national football team) Tsepo Seturumane
- (Liberia national football team) Sam Johnson
- (Liberia national football team) Mohammed Sangare
- (Liberia national football team) Terrence Tisdell
- (Malawi national football team) Gerald Phiri
- (Mozambique national football team) Geny Catamo
- (Mozambique national football team) Clésio
- (Mozambique national football team) Telinho
- (Namibia national football team) Absalom Iimbondi
- (Rwanda national football team) Djihad Bizimana
- (São Tomé and Príncipe national football team) Iniesta
- (Sierra Leone national football team) Kei Kamara
- (Sierra Leone national football team) Kwame Quee
- (Somalia national football team) Omar Mohamed
- (Somalia national football team) Anwar Shakunda
- (Tanzania national football team) Saimon Msuva
- (Tanzania national football team) Mbwana Samatta
- (Togo national football team) Kodjo Fo-Doh Laba
- (Togo national football team) Gilles Sunu
- (Zimbabwe national football team) Khama Billiat
- (Zimbabwe national football team) Marshall Munetsi
- (Zimbabwe national football team) Admiral Muskwe

1 own goal

- (Comoros national football team) Kassim M'Dahoma (against Togo)
- (Equatorial Guinea national football team) Niko Kata (against South Sudan)
- (Eritrea national football team) Esey Tesfay (against Namibia)
- (Lesotho national football team) Nkau Lerotholi (against Ethiopia)
