= 2021 Africa Cup of Nations qualification preliminary round =

Tournament details
- Dates: 9–13 October 2019
- Teams: 8 (from 1 confederation)

Tournament statistics
- Matches played: 8
- Goals scored: 17 (2.13 per match)
- Top scorer(s): (São Tomé and Príncipe) Luís Leal (3 goals)

The preliminary round of the 2021 Africa Cup of Nations qualification tournament decided four teams which advanced to the group stage of the qualification tournament. The preliminary round consisted of the eight lowest-ranked teams among the 52 CAF entrants.

The eight teams were drawn into four ties played in home-and-away two-legged format. The four winners (Chad, Gambia, São Tomé and Príncipe and South Sudan) advanced to the group stage to join the 44 teams which entered directly.

The first legs were played on 9 October, and the second legs were played on 13 October 2019.

== Matches ==
Team 1	Agg.	Team 2	1st leg	2nd leg
Liberia	1–1 (4–5 p)	Chad	1–0	0–1
South Sudan	3–1	Seychelles	2–1	1–0
Mauritius	2–5	São Tomé and Príncipe	1–3	1–2
Djibouti	2–2 (2–3 p)	Gambia	1–1	1–1

9 October 2019
16:00 UTC+0

Liberia	1–0	Chad
Sherman 43'	Report

Samuel Kanyon Doe Sports Complex, Paynesville
Referee: Gilberto Antonio dos Santos (Guinea-Bissau)
13 October 2019
14:00 UTC+1

Chad	1–0	Liberia
N'Douassel 54'	Report
Penalties
N'Douassel (penalty scored); Djibrine (penalty scored); Djimet (penalty missed); Barthélémy (penalty scored); Ninga (penalty scored); Ambassa (penalty scored)	5–4	(penalty scored) Nimely; (penalty scored) Saygbe; (penalty scored) Njie; (penalty missed) Sherman; (penalty scored) Dorley; (penalty missed) Swen

Stade Omnisports Idriss Mahamat Ouya, N'Djamena
Referee: Santillan Costa dos Santos (São Tomé and Príncipe)

1–1 on aggregate. Chad won 5–4 on penalties and advanced to qualification Group A.

9 October 2019
16:00 UTC+2

South Sudan	2–1	Seychelles
Thok 20'; Kuch 44'	Report	Hoareau 12'

Al-Merrikh Stadium, Omdurman (Sudan) (Note: South Sudan played their home match this round in Sudan due to their national stadium currently undergoing renovations.)
Referee: Emmanuel Mwandembwa (Tanzania)
13 October 2019
16:00 UTC+4

Seychelles	0–1	South Sudan
	Report	Kuch 72'

Stade Linité, Victoria
Referee: Mohamed Athoumani (Comoros)

South Sudan won 3–1 on aggregate and advanced to qualification Group B.

9 October 2019
17:00 UTC+4

Mauritius	1–3	São Tomé and Príncipe
Perticots 40'	Report	Leal 45', 60'; Silva 65'

Anjalay Stadium, Belle Vue Harel
Referee: Ibrahim Tsimanohitsy (Madagascar)
13 October 2019
16:00 UTC+0

São Tomé and Príncipe	2–1	Mauritius
Barbeiro 11'; Leal 27'	Report	Nazira 45' (pen.)

Estádio Nacional 12 de Julho, São Tomé
Referee: Prince Arcy Dongombe (Central African Republic)

São Tomé and Príncipe won 5–2 on aggregate and advanced to qualification Group C.

9 October 2019
19:00 UTC+3

Djibouti	1–1	Gambia
Mbye 59' (o.g.)	Report	Sanneh 90'

El Hadj Hassan Gouled Aptidon Stadium, Djibouti
Referee: Ibrahim Nour El Din (Egypt)
13 October 2019
16:00 UTC+0

Gambia	1–1	Djibouti
Jallow 45+3'	Report	Mahabeh 10' (pen.)
Penalties
Barrow (penalty scored); Colley (penalty missed); Ceesay (penalty scored); Ngum (penalty missed); Jallow (penalty scored)	3–2	(penalty missed) Siad; (penalty scored) Ahmed; (penalty scored) Mahabeh; (penalty missed) Moussa

Independence Stadium, Bakau
Referee: Mahamadou Keita (Mali)

2–2 on aggregate. Gambia won 3–2 on penalties and advanced to qualification Group D.

== Goalscorers ==
There were 17 goals scored in 8 matches, for an average of 2.12 goals per match.

3 goals

- (São Tomé and Príncipe) Luís Leal

2 goals

- (South Sudan) Joseph Kuch

1 goal

- (Chad) Ezechiel N'Douassel
- (Djibouti) Mahdi Houssein Mahabeh
- (The Gambia) Ablie Jallow
- (The Gambia) Bubacarr Sanneh
- (Liberia) Kpah Sherman
- (Mauritius) Ashley Nazira
- (Mauritius) Kevin Perticots
- (São Tomé and Príncipe) Marcos Barbeiro
- (São Tomé and Príncipe) Ludgério Silva
- (Seychelles) Nigel Hoareau
- (South Sudan) Koang Thok

1 own goal

- (The Gambia) Mohammed Mbye (against Djibouti)
