= Siboniso Mamba =

Liswati association football player

Personal information
- Full name: Ntokozo Siboniso Mamba
- Date of birth: 24 February 1991 (age 35)
- Place of birth: Swaziland
- Position: Defender

International career^{‡}
| Years | Team | Apps | (Gls) |
| 2018– | Eswatini | 29 | (2) |
- ‡ National team caps and goals as of 23 March 2022

Ntokozo Siboniso Mamba (born 24 February 1991) is a Liswati football player who plays for the Eswatini national team. He debuted on 4 September 2019 in the 2022 FIFA World Cup qualification, and scored his first goal for Eswatini against Djibouti in a 2–1 defeat.

== International goals ==
Scores and result list Eswatini's goal tally first.

| No. | Date | Venue | Opponent | Score | Result | Competition |
|---|---|---|---|---|---|---|
| 1. | 25 May 2019 | King Zwelithini Stadium, Durban, South Africa | Mauritius | 1–1 | 2–2 | 2019 COSAFA Cup |
| 2. | 4 September 2019 | El Hadj Hassan Gouled Aptidon Stadium, Djibouti City, Djibouti | Djibouti | 1–1 | 1–2 | 2022 FIFA World Cup qualification |
