= Bubacarr Sanneh =

Gambian footballer (born 1994)

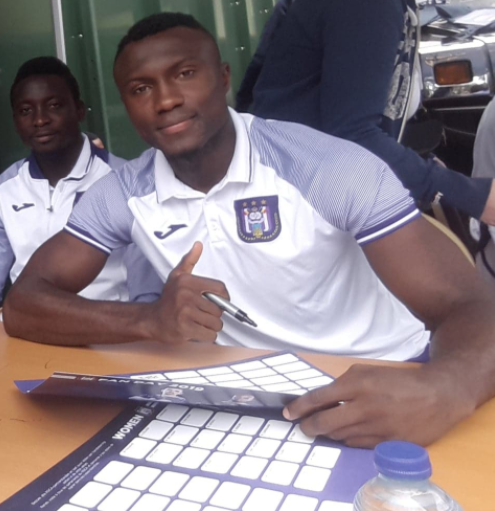

Personal information
- Date of birth: 14 November 1994 (age 31)
- Place of birth: Serekunda, The Gambia
- Height: 1.83 m (6 ft 0 in)
- Position: Centre-back

Senior career*
| Years | Team | Apps | (Gls) |
| 2012–2015 | Real de Banjul | | |
| 2014–2015 | → Horsens (loan) | 17 | (3) |
| 2015–2017 | Horsens | 90 | (14) |
| 2017–2018 | Midtjylland | 16 | (3) |
| 2018–2021 | Anderlecht | 12 | (1) |
| 2019–2020 | → Göztepe (loan) | 2 | (0) |
| 2020 | → Oostende (loan) | 3 | (0) |
| 2021 | → AGF (loan) | 8 | (0) |
| 2022 | SønderjyskE | 8 | (0) |
| 2023 | Zvijezda 09 | 2 | (0) |

International career^{‡}
| 2012– | Gambia | 40 | (1) |
- * Club domestic league appearances and goals as of 5 October 2023 ‡ National team caps and goals as of 9 June 2024

Bubacarr Sanneh (born 14 November 1994) is a Gambian professional footballer who plays as a centre-back for the Gambia national team.

== Club career ==
Born in Serekunda, Sanneh began his career with Real de Banjul.

On 1 September 2014 AC Horsens confirmed, that they had signed Sanneh on a season long loan-deal with a buying option. He made his debut on 10 November 2014 against Viborg FF, where he played the whole match and scored a goal. AC Horsens utilized the buying option, and announced the transfer on 22 April 2015.

On 5 November 2017 Sanneh officially signed with Midtjylland on a four-year deal, with the transfer happening during the winter transfer window.

In August 2018, Sanneh signed a five-year deal with Belgian club Anderlecht for a transfer fee believed to be €8m. He made his competitive debut for the club in a 1–1 home draw with Royal Antwerp before scoring his first goal in a 2–1 win over Standard Liège. In August 2019, he signed for Turkish club Göztepe on loan before terminating the contract by mutual consent. He returned to Belgium in January 2020 to join Oostende on loan until the end of the season. On 25 January 2021, Sanneh was sent on a six-month loan to AGF. His Anderlecht contract was cancelled on 31 August 2021.

On 21 February 2022, Sanneh returned to Denmark and signed a deal with Danish Superliga club SønderjyskE until the end of the season. After a season, which ended with relegation, Sanneh left the club as his contract expired.

== International career ==
He made his international debut for Gambia in 2012. He played in the 2021 Africa Cup of Nations, his national team's first continental tournament, where they made the quarter-final.

=== International goals ===
Scores and results list the Gambia's goal tally first, score column indicates score after each Sanneh goal.

List of international goals scored by Bubacarr Sanneh
| No. | Date | Venue | Opponent | Score | Result | Competition |
|---|---|---|---|---|---|---|
| 1 | 9 October 2019 | El Hadj Hassan Gouled Aptidon Stadium, Djibouti City, Djibouti | Djibouti | 1–1 | 1–1 | 2021 Africa Cup of Nations qualification |

== Personal life ==
Sanneh's younger brother Muhammed is also a professional footballer.

== Honours ==
Midtjylland

- Danish Superliga: 2017–18

Individual

- AC Horsens Player of the Year: 2014–15
