= Muzamir Mutyaba =

Ugandan footballer (born 1993)

Personal information
- Date of birth: 10 October 1993 (age 33)
- Place of birth: Kampala, Uganda
- Height: 1.72 m (5 ft 8 in)
- Position: Midfielder

Team information
- Current team: NEC FC

Senior career*
Years	Team	Apps	(Gls)
2011–2012	Maroons		
2012–2015	Victoria University		
2015–2021	Kampala Capital City Authority		
2021	Express	14	(0)
2021–2024	Kiyovu Sports		
2024	Mbale Heroes		
2024–	NEC FC		

International career^{‡}
2014–	Uganda	35	(3)
- * Club domestic league appearances and goals as of 10:12, 30 November 2024 (UTC) ‡ National team caps and goals as of 10:12, 30 November 2024 (UTC)

Muzamir Mutyaba (born 10 October 1993) is an Ugandan international footballer who plays for NEC FC, as a midfielder.

== Club career ==
Born in Kampala, Mutyaba played early club football for Maroons, Victoria University and Kampala Capital City Authority. After leaving KCCA at the end of the 2019–20 season, in January 2021 he signed for Express.

After playing in Rwanda for Kiyovu Sports, and a short spell with Mbale Heroes, in June 2024 he signed for NEC FC, and by November he was the club's top scorer for the season at that time.

== International career ==
He made his international debut for Uganda in 2014.

=== International goals ===
Scores and results Uganda's goal tally first.

No.	Date	Venue	Opponent	Score	Result	Competition
1.	12 August 2017	St Mary's Stadium Kitende, Kampala, Uganda	Rwanda	1–0	3–0	2018 African Nations Championship qualification
2.	12 August 2017	St Mary's Stadium Kitende, Kampala, Uganda	Rwanda	2–0	3–0	2018 African Nations Championship qualification
3.	4 October 2017	Lugogo Stadium, Kampala, Uganda	Madagascar	1–0	1–2	Friendly
4.	15 December 2019	Lugogo Stadium, Kampala, Uganda	Djibouti	1–0	4–1	2019 CECAFA Cup
