= 2019 CECAFA Cup =

International football competition

CECAFA Senior Challenge Cup

Tournament details
- Host country: Uganda
- Dates: 7–19 December
- Teams: 9 (from 1 sub-confederation)
- Venue: 1 (in 1 host city)

Final positions
- Champions: Uganda (15th title)
- Runners-up: Eritrea
- Third place: Kenya
- Fourth place: Tanzania

Tournament statistics
- Matches played: 20
- Goals scored: 40 (2 per match)
- Top scorer(s): (Kenya) Hassan Abdallah (Kenya) Oscar Musa Wamalwa (Uganda) Bright Anukani (3 goals each)

The 2019 CECAFA Cup was the 40th edition of the annual CECAFA Cup, an international football competition consisting of the national teams of member nations of the Council for East and Central Africa Football Associations (CECAFA). It took place in Uganda in December 2019.

== Participants ==
The following teams were confirmed to be participating in the tournament. The national team of the Democratic Republic of Congo was announced to participate in place of Rwanda. Ethiopia, DR Congo and South Sudan all withdrew from the tournament in December 2019. The reason was the financial shortages of each respective federation which prevented them from meeting the $20,000 entry requirement.

National Team	FIFA Ranking (November 2019)
Burundi	151
Djibouti	184
Eritrea	205
Kenya	111
Somalia	196
Sudan	128
Tanzania	134
Uganda	77
Zanzibar	N/A

== Match officials ==
Referees

- Mfaume Nassoro (Zanzibar)
- Thierry Nkurunziza (Burundi)
- Anthony Ogwayo (Kenya)
- Ali Sabilla (Uganda)
- Omar Abdulkadir Artan (Somalia)
- Mohamed Diraneh Guedi (Djibouti)
- Tsegay Teklu Mogos (Eritrea)
- Sabri Mohamed Fadul (Sudan)

Assistant Referees

- Ferdinand Chacha (Tanzania)
- Nagi Subahi Ahmed (Sudan)
- Joshua Achilla (Kenya)
- Musa Balikoowa (Uganda)
- Bashir Sheikh Suleiman (Somalia)
- Liban Abdirazack Ahmed (Djibouti)
- Eyobel Michael Ghebru (Eritrea)

== Venue ==
Kampala	2019 CECAFA Cup is located in Uganda
Lugogo Stadium	2019 CECAFA Cup is located in Uganda
Capacity: 3000	2019 CECAFA Cup is located in Uganda

== Group stage ==
=== Group A ===
Pos	Team	Pld	W	D	L	GF	GA	GD	Pts	Qualification
1	Uganda (H)	4	4	0	0	10	2	+8	12	Advance to knockout stage
2	Eritrea	4	2	1	1	4	2	+2	7	Advance to knockout stage
3	Somalia	4	1	2	1	1	2	−1	5	
4	Djibouti	4	1	1	2	3	8	−5	4	
5	Burundi	4	0	0	4	2	6	−4	0	

Rules for classification: Tiebreakers
(H) Hosts
7 December 2019
11.30

Djibouti	0–0	Somalia

Lugogo Stadium, Kampala
Referee: Thierry Nkurunziza (Burundi)
7 December 2019
14.00

Uganda	2–1	Burundi
Anukani 10'; Bayo 23'		Rurasenga 63'

Lugogo Stadium, Kampala
Referee: Anthony Ogwayo (Kenya)

9 December 2019
11.30

Eritrea	1–0	Burundi
Kidane 45+2'

Lugogo Stadium, Kampala
Referee: Mfaume Nassoro (Zanzibar)
9 December 2019
14.00

Somalia	0–2	Uganda
		Okello 28', 67'

Lugogo Stadium, Kampala
Referee: Mohamed Diraneh Guedi (Djibouti)

11 December 2019
11.30

Burundi	1–2	Djibouti
Ndikumana 14'		Mahabeh 10', 70' (pen.)

Lugogo Stadium, Kampala
Referee: Anthony Ogwayo (Kenya)
11 December 2019
14.00

Eritrea	0–2	Uganda
		Kazozi 58'; Kizza 76' (pen.)

Lugogo Stadium, Kampala
Referee: Omar Abdulkadir Artan (Somalia)

13 December 2019
11.30

Djibouti	0–3	Eritrea
		Okbay 11'; Sulieman 65', 82'

Lugogo Stadium, Kampala
Referee: Thierry Nkurunziza (Burundi)
13 December 2019
14.00

Burundi	0–1	Somalia
		Mohamed 40'

StarTimes Stadium, Kampala
Referee: Sabri Mohamed Fadul (Sudan)

15 December 2019
11.30

Somalia	0–0	Eritrea

Lugogo Stadium, Kampala
Referee: Anthony Ogwayo (Kenya)
15 December 2019
14.00

Uganda	4–1	Djibouti
Mutyaba 14' (pen.); Ojera 65'; Ocen 79'; Anukani 81'		Mohamed 69'

Lugogo Stadium, Kampala
Referee: Sabri Mohamed Fadul (Sudan)

=== Group B ===
Pos	Team	Pld	W	D	L	GF	GA	GD	Pts	Qualification
1	Kenya	3	3	0	0	4	1	+3	9	Advance to knockout stage
2	Tanzania	3	1	1	1	1	1	0	4	Advance to knockout stage
3	Sudan	3	0	2	1	2	3	−1	2	
4	Zanzibar	3	0	1	2	1	3	−2	1	

Rules for classification: Tiebreakers
8 December 2019
11.30

Zanzibar	1–1	Sudan
Khamis 55'		Muntasir 90'

Lugogo Stadium, Kampala
Referee: Omar Abdulkadir Artan (Somalia)
8 December 2019
14.00

Kenya	1–0	Tanzania
Abdallah 4'

Lugogo Stadium, Kampala
Referee: Ali Sabilla (Uganda)

10 December 2019
11.30

Sudan	1–2	Kenya
Namir 30'		Abdallah 65'; Wamalwa 76'

Lugogo Stadium, Kampala
Referee: Tsegay Teklu Mogos (Eritrea)
10 December 2019
14.00

Tanzania	1–0	Zanzibar
Ditram Nchimbi 38'

Lugogo Stadium, Kampala
Referee: Thierry Nkurunziza (Burundi)

14 December 2019
11.30

Kenya	1–0	Zanzibar
Wamalwa 48'

Lugogo Stadium, Kampala
Referee: Ali Sabilla (Uganda)
14 December 2019
14.00

Sudan	0–0	Tanzania

Lugogo Stadium, Kampala
Referee: Mohamed Diraneh Guedi (Djibouti)

== Knockout stage ==
=== Bracket ===
Semi-finals
17 December – Kampala
Kenya	1
Eritrea	4
17 December – Kampala
Uganda	1
Tanzania	0

Final
19 December – Kampala
Uganda	3
Eritrea	0
Third place match
19 December – Kampala
Kenya	2
Tanzania	1

=== Semi-finals ===
17 December 2019
11:00

Kenya	1–4	Eritrea
Wamalwa 52'		Wamalwa 19' (o.g.); Okbay 49'; Habte 66'; Kidane 74'

Lugogo Stadium, Kampala
Referee: Sabri Mohamed Fadul (Sudan)
17 December 2019
13:45

Uganda	1–0	Tanzania
Bayo 86'

Lugogo Stadium, Kampala
Referee: Mohamed Diraneh Guedi (Djibouti)

=== Third place match ===
19 December 2019
11:00

Kenya	2–1	Tanzania
Muguna 19'; Abdallah 36'		Kamagi 82' (pen.)

Lugogo Stadium, Kampala
Referee: Omar Abdulkadir Artan (Somalia)

=== Final ===
19 December 2019
13:45

Uganda	3–0	Eritrea
Anukani 31'; Kizza 68'; Madondo 88'

Lugogo Stadium, Kampala
Referee: Sabri Mohamed Fadul (Sudan)

== Goalscorers ==
3 goals

- (Kenya) Hassan Abdallah
- (Kenya) Oscar Musa Wamalwa
- (Uganda) Bright Anukani

2 goals

- (Djibouti) Mahdi Houssein Mahabeh
- (Eritrea) Robel Kidane
- (Eritrea) Abel Okbay
- (Eritrea) Ali Sulieman
- (Uganda) Kizza Mustafa
- (Uganda) Fahad Bayo
- (Uganda) Allan Okello

1 goal

- (Burundi) Landry Ndikumana
- (Burundi) Cedric Rurasenga
- (Djibouti) Haroun Mohamed
- (Eritrea) Michael Habte
- (Kenya) Kenneth Muguna
- (Somalia) Omar Mohamed
- (Sudan) Mohamed Abbas Namir
- (Sudan) Muntasir Osman
- (Tanzania) Gadiel Kamagi
- (Tanzania) Ditram Nchimbi
- (Uganda) Nicholas Kazozi
- (Uganda) Muzamir Mutyaba
- (Uganda) Ben Ocen
- (Uganda) Joakim Ojera
- (Zanzibar) Makame Khamis
