= Yonis =

Yonis may refer to:

- Mohamed Yonis, Somalilander–Canadian diplomat
- Yonis Farah (born 1999), Somalian footballer
- Yonis Kireh (born 2000), Djiboutian footballer
- Yonis Njoh (born 2004), French footballer
- Yonis Reuf (1918–1948), Kurdish poet

== See also ==
- Yoni, a Hindu symbol
- Yonas Mekuria (sometimes misspelled as Yonis Mekuria)
