= List of association football players capped by two senior national teams =

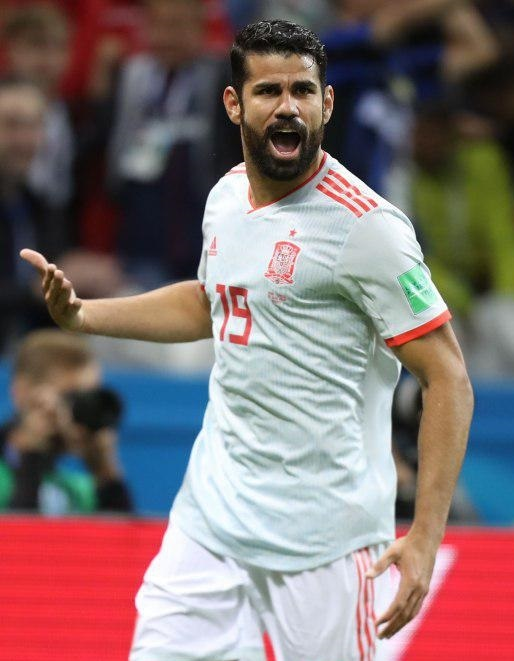
Diego Costa represented Brazil in 2013, and Spain from 2014 to 2018.

In association football, the situation of players being capped by two senior national teams is fairly rare. The list of these players includes only those who have been capped by two countries for senior matches. It does not include the far wider scope of those who have played at youth level (U23 or below) for one country then at senior level for another – something which became possible following a 2004 rule change, then more common when age limit was removed in 2009 – or those who were eligible for more than one country, but only played for one.

== Non-inclusion categories ==
- Players whose original country ceased to exist and who then played for a successor state, prominent examples being those who had played for the Soviet Union (and/or Commonwealth of Independent States), East Germany, Yugoslavia or Czechoslovakia in the early 1990s, or who played for one national team prior to a region becoming independent and then also played for that new state, for example the secession of South Sudan from Sudan. This contrasts to the situation with Kosovo in the 2010s when it became an official FIFA team: several players who had moved to other parts of Europe in childhood switched from those national teams (or Albania, which granted passports to those displaced ethnic Albanian persons) to play for Kosovo, but this change was not automatic based on their birthplace, and as such those who made that choice are listed below (see Football in Kosovo).
- Players who were capped for one or more countries in a youth match and then a different country in senior matches.
- Players who appeared for non-affiliated regional teams such as Catalonia. (However, players who played in an official continental tournament, such as the CONCACAF Gold Cup, are included)
- Players who featured for more than one of the national teams representing Ireland in the second quarter of the 20th century, which are listed separately.
- Players who featured for a Great Britain team (i.e. at the Olympics and/or Universiade) in addition to one of the Home Nations. (However, players who featured for multiple Home Nations separately, for example England and Scotland, are included)

== Eligibility ==
In the 20th century, FIFA allowed a player to play for any national team, as long as the player held nationality of that country. In 2004, in reaction to the growing trend towards naturalisation of foreign players in some countries, FIFA implemented a significant new ruling that requires a player to demonstrate a "clear connection" to any country they wish to represent. Under the rules, in order for a player to switch nationalities, a player must not have played in a competitive fixture (that is, can only have played in friendlies for the first country), and FIFA approval is necessary.

In 2021, FIFA published a new set of rules, updating the rules for changes of nationalities. While previously, players were able to switch only if they had appeared in friendly fixture(s) for the first nation, with the growing trend of competitive fixtures such as the Nations League replacing many friendly fixtures, the change was made. Under the new regulations, players can switch national teams, even if they have played in an official competition for the first nation (unless the match was in the tournament phases of the World Cup or a continental competition), provided they played in three or fewer competitive matches and the appearance(s) occurred before the player turned 21. These changes were intended to prevent the 'stockpiling' of players. If a player is 21 or over, the previous rule remains in place: to be eligible for a switch, any appearance(s) must have been in non-competitive fixtures.

== List of players ==
=== 2021–present ===
Beginning in 2021, FIFA adjusted their rules to allow for players to be eligible to represent a new national team if they had played in no more than three competitive fixtures (including none in the tournament phases of the FIFA World Cup and continental competitions) prior to the age of 21 or if they had only played in non-competitive (friendly) matches at any age. Three years must have passed since the date of the previous competitive fixture in order for the player to be eligible to switch; there is no time requirement for friendly matches.

Player	First cap	Switched allegiance to	Year of switch	Ref.
Adrian Bajrami	Albania	Switzerland	2025	
Elizabeta Ejupi (female)	Albania (women)	Kosovo (women)	2022	
Anissa Lahmari (female)	Algeria (women)	Morocco (women)	2023	
Elber Binha	Angola	Cape Verde	2022	
Jalmaro Calvin	Antigua and Barbuda	Jamaica	2025	
Rogelio Funes Mori	Argentina	Mexico	2021	
Ryan Williams	Australia	India	2025	
Indiah-Paige Riley (female)	Australia (women)	New Zealand (women)	2022	
Angela Beard (female)	Australia (women)	Philippines (women)	2023	
Laura Hughes (female)	Australia (women)	Wales (women)	2025	
Joris Kayembe	Belgium	DR Congo	2023	
Jorthy Mokio	Belgium	DR Congo	2026	
Denis Odoi	Belgium	Ghana	2022	
Hannes Delcroix	Belgium	Haiti	2025	
Samuel Nlend	Cameroon	Central African Republic	2022	
Djawal Kaiba	Cameroon	Chad	2025	
Bertrand Mani	Cameroon	Chad	2025	
Ahmad Ngouyamsa	Cameroon	Chad	2024	
Shamit Shome	Canada	Bangladesh	2025	
Noble Okello	Canada	Uganda	2026	
Jaclyn Sawicki (female)	Canada (women)	Philippines (women)	2022	
David Sambissa	Congo	Gabon	2021	
Christian Martínez	Costa Rica	El Salvador	2021	
Brayan López	Costa Rica	Nicaragua	2022	
Filip Ozobić	Croatia	Azerbaijan	2021	
Nikola Katić	Croatia	Bosnia and Herzegovina	2024	
Ivan Šunjić	Croatia	Bosnia and Herzegovina	2024	
Arenchelo Leito	Curaçao	Aruba	2026	
Bradley Martis	Curaçao	Aruba	2025	
Jonathan Richard	Curaçao	Aruba	2021	
Lobi Manzoki	DR Congo	Central African Republic	2022	
Maia Cabrera (female)	Dominican Republic (women)	Israel (women)	2025	
Jaydah Bedoya (female)	Ecuador (women)	Puerto Rico (women)	2025	
Steven Caulker	England	Sierra Leone	2022 (Note: Steven Caulker's one-time switch was approved by FIFA in October 2021, his official Sierra Leone debut occurred in January 2022.)	
Drew Spence (female)	England (women)	Jamaica (women)	2021	
Sandy MacIver (female)	England (women)	Scotland (women)	2023	
Houssem Aouar	France	Algeria	2023	
Marine Dafeur (female)	France (women)	Algeria (women)	2023	
Mahmoud Dahoud	Germany	Syria	2026	
Ellie Mason (female)	Gibraltar (women)	Northern Ireland (women)	2022	
Jean-Pierre Morgan	Guadeloupe	Madagascar	2024	
Mohamed Zougrana	Ivory Coast	Burkina Faso	2025	
Oumar Sako	Ivory Coast	Niger	2024	
Roger Aholou	Ivory Coast	Togo	2021	
Mirlind Daku	Kosovo	Albania	2023	
Arbër Hoxha	Kosovo	Albania	2024	
Agon Sadiku	Kosovo	Finland	2023	
Liridon Krasniqi	Kosovo	Malaysia	2021 (Note: Krasniqi's FIFA one-time switch was approved in 2020, however he only made his debut for Malaysia in 2021.)	
Uran Bislimi	Kosovo	Switzerland	2023	
Kieran Ngwenya	Malawi	Trinidad and Tobago	2026	
Julio Donisa	Martinique	Madagascar	2022	
Marcelo Flores	Mexico	Canada	2026	
Alejandro Zendejas	Mexico (Note: Zendejas' two caps for Mexico in 2021 and 2022 were non-FIFA sanctioned friendly matches. In January 2023, FIFA deemed the matches as invalidated and Mexico was sanctioned.)	United States	2023	
Hoda Khalaf (female)	Morocco (women)	Iraq (women)	2024	
Vurnon Anita	Netherlands	Curaçao	2021	
Riechedly Bazoer	Netherlands	Curaçao	2025	
Joshua Brenet	Netherlands	Curaçao	2024	
Pablo Rosario	Netherlands	Dominican Republic	2025	
Jean-Paul Boëtius	Netherlands	Suriname	2025	
Samantha van Diemen (female)	Netherlands (women)	Dominican Republic (women)	2025	
Pothin Poma	New Caledonia	Tahiti	2024	
Osame Sahraoui	Norway	Morocco	2024	
Jorge Méndez	Panama	El Salvador	2026	
Hélder Costa	Portugal	Angola	2021	
Lucas João	Portugal	Angola	2022	
Ricardo Ferreira	Portugal	Canada	2021	
Edgar Ié	Portugal	Guinea-Bissau	2023 (Note: Edagr Ié's one-time switch was approved by FIFA in 2021.)	
Stefanie da Eira (female)	Portugal (women)	Switzerland (women)	2021	
Kaïlé Auvray	Saint Martin	Trinidad and Tobago	2023	
Jason Cummings	Scotland	Australia	2022	
Khadim Diaw	Senegal	Mauritania	2022	
Samed Baždar	Serbia	Bosnia and Herzegovina	2024	
Iñaki Williams	Spain	Ghana	2022	
Brahim Díaz	Spain	Morocco	2024	
Munir El Haddadi	Spain	Morocco	2021	
Damaris Egurrola (female)	Spain (women)	Netherlands (women)	2022	
Armin Gigović	Sweden	Bosnia and Herzegovina	2024	
Kristopher Da Graca	Sweden	Cape Verde	2023	
Tesfaldet Tekie	Sweden	Eritrea	2026	
Omar Faraj	Sweden	Palestine	2024	
Moustafa Zeidan	Sweden	Palestine	2024	
Hosam Aiesh	Sweden	Syria	2022	
Daleho Irandust	Sweden	Syria	2024	
Aiham Ousou	Sweden	Syria	2024	
Albian Hajdari	Switzerland	Kosovo	2025	
Maria Khan (female)	United Arab Emirates (women)	Pakistan (women)	2022	
Esmir Bajraktarević	United States	Bosnia and Herzegovina	2024	
Ayo Akinola	United States	Canada	2021	
Aaron Herrera	United States	Guatemala	2023	
Rubio Rubin	United States	Guatemala	2022	
Fafà Picault	United States	Haiti	2023	
Julián Araujo	United States	Mexico	2021	
Jonathan Gómez	United States	Mexico	2022	
Brian Gutiérrez	United States	Mexico	2026	
Richard Ledezma	United States	Mexico	2026	

=== 2004–2020 ===
Between 2004 and 2020, FIFA permitted players to play for a new association if the player had only played in non-competitive fixtures (friendlies) for the original nation or if the new association was a newly-formed nation.

Player	First cap	Switched allegiance to	Year of switch	Ref.
Fidan Aliti	Albania	Kosovo	2017	
Besart Berisha	Albania	Kosovo	2017	
Mërgim Brahimi	Albania	Kosovo	2015	
Debatik Curri	Albania	Kosovo	2014 (Note: Debatik Curri first represented Albania from 2006 to 2014, switched to represent Kosovo then switched back to Albania that same year.)	
Besnik Hasi	Albania	Kosovo	2007	
Alban Meha	Albania	Kosovo	2016	
Milot Rashica	Albania	Kosovo	2016	
Amir Rrahmani	Albania	Kosovo	2014	
Herolind Shala	Albania	Kosovo	2016	
Samir Ujkani	Albania	Kosovo	2014	
Fitore Govori (female)	Albania (women)	Kosovo (women)	2017	
Qendresa Krasniqi (female)	Albania (women)	Kosovo (women)	2017	
Arta Rama (female)	Albania (women)	Kosovo (women)	2017	
Egzona Zeka (female)	Albania (women)	Kosovo (women)	2017	
Aïmen Demai	Algeria	Tunisia	2009	
Gastón Giménez	Argentina	Paraguay	2020	
Denzel Dumfries	Aruba	Netherlands	2018	
Mehdi Carcela	Belgium	Morocco	2011	
Kenny Kunst	Bonaire	Curaçao	2011	
Adis Nurković	Bosnia and Herzegovina	Kosovo	2017	
Thiago Motta	Brazil (Note: Motta played for Brazil at the 2003 CONCACAF Gold Cup, a senior tournament. However, Brazil were an invited guest and fielded an under-23 team, meaning that their players did not earn official caps for the tournament.)	Italy	2011	
Mário Fernandes	Brazil	Russia	2017	
Diego Costa	Brazil	Spain	2014	
Adriana Parente (female)	Brazil (women)	Equatorial Guinea (women)	2008 (Note: In 2017, she was deemed ineligible for Equatorial Guinea.)	
Vânia (female)	Brazil (women)	Equatorial Guinea (women)	2011	
Solomon Asante	Burkina Faso	Ghana	2012	
Innocent Mbonihankuye	Burundi	Djibouti	2019	
Quillan Roberts	Canada	Guyana	2019	
La'Vere Corbin-Ong	Canada	Malaysia	2019	
Tiffany Cameron (female)	Canada (women)	Jamaica (women)	2019	
Francisco Flores	Costa Rica	Nicaragua	2018	
Mato Jajalo	Croatia	Bosnia and Herzegovina	2016	
Arijan Ademi	Croatia	North Macedonia	2014	
Rugenio Josephia	Curaçao	Bonaire	2013	
Simon Anthony	Dominica	Anguilla	2008	
Dodi Lukébakio	DR Congo	Belgium	2020	
Ilombe Mboyo	DR Congo	Belgium	2012	
Jean-Paul Eale Lutula	DR Congo	Rwanda	2009	
Wilfried Zaha	England	Ivory Coast	2017	
Salimata Simporé (female)	Equatorial Guinea (women)	Burkina Faso (women)	2011	
Mehmet Hetemaj	Finland	Kosovo	2014 (Note: Hetemaj made his senior debut for Kosovo in a 6–1 loss against Turkey in May 2014, a friendly match. However, he lost his eligibility to switch for Kosovo in competitive matches after accepting new call-ups from Finland in 2016, precisely when Kosovo became a member of both UEFA and FIFA.)	
Lum Rexhepi	Finland	Kosovo	2014	
Paul-Georges Ntep	France	Cameroon	2018	
Geoffrey Kondogbia	France	Central African Republic	2018	
Florent Malouda	France	French Guiana (Note: French Guiana, Martinique, and Guadeloupe are CONCACAF-affiliated, not FIFA-affiliated, which allowed the player to represent the team in after previously playing in official matches for the former nation)	2017	
Jocelyn Angloma	France	Guadeloupe	2006	
Julien Faubert	France	Martinique	2014	
Frédéric Piquionne	France	Martinique	2012	
Roman Neustädter	Germany	Russia	2016	
Jermaine Jones	Germany	United States	2010	
Apostolos Giannou	Greece	Australia	2016	
Alsény Këïta	Guinea	Liberia	2011	
Aubrey David	Guyana	Trinidad and Tobago	2012	
Elmer Mejía	Honduras	Nicaragua	2014	
Declan Rice	Republic of Ireland	England	2019	
Alex Bruce	Republic of Ireland	Northern Ireland	2013	
Kenny Saief	Israel	United States	2017	
Franco Vázquez	Italy	Argentina	2018	
Ardian Ismajli	Kosovo	Albania	2018	
Fatoumata (female)	Mali (women)	Equatorial Guinea (women)	2017	
Edgar Castillo	Mexico	United States	2009	
Sofia Huerta (female)	Mexico (women)	United States (women)	2017	
Ina Budestean (Ina Boyko) (female)	Moldova (women)	Azerbaijan (women)	2009 (Note: In 2009, began competing under the fake name Ina Boyko with a fake birthday for Azerbaijan. In 2010, she was deemed ineligible for Azerbaijan and resumed competing with Moldova in 2015)	
Ina Budestean (Ina Boyko) (female)	Azerbaijan (women)	Moldova (women)	2015	
Julian Wade	Montserrat	Dominica	2014	
Nacer Chadli	Morocco	Belgium	2011	
Tyler Boyd	New Zealand	United States	2019	
Taulant Seferi	North Macedonia	Albania	2019	
Valon Berisha	Norway	Kosovo	2016	
Ardian Gashi	Norway	Kosovo	2014	
Nelson David Cabrera	Paraguay	Bolivia	2016	
Mohammed Salem Al-Enazi	Qatar	United Arab Emirates	2009	
Mohsin Nzeyimana	Rwanda	Burundi	2006	
Junior Laurencin	Saint Lucia	U.S. Virgin Islands	2011	
Vladimir Volkov	Serbia	Montenegro	2012	
Anel Ahmedhodžić	Sweden	Bosnia and Herzegovina	2020	
Mikael Dyrestam	Sweden	Guinea	2019	
Pa Konate	Sweden	Guinea	2019	
Saman Ghoddos	Sweden	Iran	2017	
Jiloan Hamad	Sweden	Iraq	2019	
Erton Fejzullahu	Sweden	Kosovo	2015	
David Mitov Nilsson	Sweden	North Macedonia	2015	
Dino Islamović	Sweden	Montenegro	2020	
Louay Chanko	Sweden	Syria	2008	
George Mourad	Sweden	Syria	2011	
Izet Hajrović	Switzerland	Bosnia and Herzegovina	2013	
Heinz Barmettler	Switzerland	Dominican Republic	2012	
Albert Bunjaku	Switzerland	Kosovo	2013	
Florent Hadergjonaj	Switzerland	Kosovo	2019	
Ricky Shakes	Trinidad and Tobago	Guyana	2011	
Oliver Mbekeka (female)	Uganda (women)	DR Congo (women)	2006	
Pavel Pashayev	Ukraine	Azerbaijan	2015	
Tony Tchani	United States	Cameroon	2016	
A. J. DeLaGarza	United States	Guam	2013	
Veronica Zepeda Cashman (female)	United States (women)	Mexico (women)	2004	

=== Prior to 2004 ===
Prior to 2004, players could play for a new nation provided they were citizens of that country.

Player	First cap	Switched allegiance to	Year of switch	Ref.
Colin Campbell	Argentina	Chile	1910	
Miguel Ángel Lauri	Argentina	France	1937	
Héctor De Bourgoing	Argentina	France	1962	
Antonio Angelillo	Argentina	Italy	1960	
Renato Cesarini	Argentina	Italy	1931	
Attilio Demaría	Argentina	Italy	1932	
Enrique Guaita	Argentina	Italy	1934 (Note: Represented Argentina in 1933, then represented Italy between 1934 and 1935, then represented Argentina again in 1937)	
Enrique Guaita	Italy	Argentina	1937	
Julio Libonatti	Argentina	Italy	1926	
Francisco Lojacono	Argentina	Italy	1959	
Rinaldo Martino	Argentina	Italy	1949	
Humberto Maschio	Argentina	Italy	1962	
Luis Monti	Argentina	Italy	1932	
Raimundo Orsi	Argentina	Italy	1929 (Note: Represented Argentina between 1924 and 1928, then represented Italy between 1929 and 1935, then represented Argentina again in 1936)	
Raimundo Orsi	Italy	Argentina	1936	
Alejandro Scopelli	Argentina	Italy	1935 (Note: Represented Argentina between 1929 and 1937, and represented Italy in the middle in 1935)	
Omar Sívori	Argentina	Italy	1961	
Alfredo Di Stéfano	Argentina	Colombia	1949 (Note: Represented Argentina in 1947, then represented Colombia (Not recognized by FIFA) in 1949, then represented Spain from 1957 to 1962)	
Alfredo Di Stéfano	Colombia	Spain	1957	
Ken Hough	Australia	New Zealand	1958	
Kristy Moore (female)	Australia (women)	England (women)	2002	
Josef Bican	Austria	Czechoslovakia	1936 (Note: Represented Bohemia and Moraivia in 1939 when it was annexed from TCH)	
Karel Koželuh	Austria	Czechoslovakia	1923	
Josef Sedláček	Austria	Czechoslovakia	1920	
Jan Vaník	Austria	Czechoslovakia	1920	
Karl Kanhäuser	Austria	Czechoslovakia	1931	
Rodolphe Hiden	Austria	France	1940	
Henri Hiltl	Austria	France	1940	
Franz Binder	Austria	Germany	1939 (Note: From 1938 to 1945, Austria was part of Nazi Germany)	
Franz Hanreiter	Austria	Germany	1940	
Matthias Kaburek	Austria	Germany	1939	
Josef Pekarek	Austria	Germany	1938	
Peter Platzer	Austria	Germany	1939	
Willibald Schmaus	Austria	Germany	1938	
Stefan Skoumal	Austria	Germany	1938	
Karl Sesta	Austria	Germany	1941 (Note: From 1938 to 1945, Austria was part of Nazi Germany. Returned to representing Austria following WWII)	
Karl Sesta	Germany	Austria	1945	
Wilhelm Hahnemann	Austria	Germany	1938	
Wilhelm Hahnemann	Germany	Austria	1946	
Hans Mock	Austria	Germany	1938	
Leopold Neumer	Austria	Germany	1938	
Leopold Neumer	Germany	Austria	1945	
Hans Pesser	Austria	Germany	1938	
Rudolf Raftl	Austria	Germany	1938	
Josef Stroh	Austria	Germany	1938	
Josef Stroh	Germany	Austria	1946	
Johann Urbanek	Austria	Germany	1941	
Franz Wagner	Austria	Germany	1938	
Rudolf Rupec	Austria	Yugoslavia	1920	
Anfilogino Guarisi (Filó)	Brazil	Italy	1932	
José Altafini	Brazil	Italy	1961	
Karel Burkert	Bulgaria	Czechoslovakia	1934	
Kiril Simonovski	Bulgaria	Yugoslavia	1946	
Bozhin Laskov	Bulgaria	Czechoslovakia	1953	
Joe Kennaway	Canada	Scotland	1933	
Gordon Burness	Canada	United States	1926	
Hernán Bolaños	Costa Rica	Chile	1940	
Željko Vuković	Croatia	Austria	2001	
Josip Weber	Croatia	Belgium	1994	
Sejad Halilović	Croatia	Bosnia and Herzegovina	1996	
Gregor Židan	Croatia	Slovenia	1992	
Géza Kalocsay	Czechoslovakia	Hungary	1940	
Gejza Kocsis	Czechoslovakia	Hungary	1937	
Ferenc Szedlacsek	Czechoslovakia	Hungary	1928	
László Kubala	Czechoslovakia	Hungary	1948 (Note: Represented TCH from 1946 to 1947, then represented Hungary in 1948, then represented Spain from 1953 to 1961)	
László Kubala	Hungary	Spain	1953	
Alberto Spencer	Ecuador	Uruguay	1964* (Note: Represented the two nations simultaneously, switching back and forth)	
Ken Armstrong	England	New Zealand	1958	
John Hawley Edwards	England	Wales	1876	
Jackie Sewell	England	Zambia	1964	
Jeanny Allott (female)	England (women)	Netherlands (women)	1984	
Audrey Rigby (female)	England (women)	New Zealand (women)	1983	
Mahi Khennane	France	Algeria	1963	
Rachid Mekhloufi	France	Algeria	1963	
Félix Romano	France	Italy	1921	
Michel Platini	France	Kuwait (Note: Came out of retirement for one day to play in an international friendly match representing Kuwait against the Soviet Union, at the request of the Kuwaiti emir. He did not become a citizen of Kuwait.)	1988	
Abderrahmane Mahjoub	France	Morocco	1961	
Mustapha Zitouni	France	Algeria	1963	
Marius Hiller	Germany	Argentina	1916	
Karl Decker	Germany	Austria	1945 (Note: Represented Austria following re-independence from Germany after WWII)	
Ludwig Durek	Germany	Austria	1945	
Max Merkel	West Germany	Austria	1952	
Ernst Sabeditsch	Germany	Austria	1945	
Abdul Ganiyu Salami	Ghana	Nigeria	1967	
Pavlos Vasiliou	Greece	Cyprus	1970	
Kostas Choumis	Greece	Romania	1941	
Joe Gaetjens	Haiti	United States	1950 (Note: Represented Haiti in 1944, then represented USA in 1950, then represented Haiti again in 1953)	
Joe Gaetjens	United States	Haiti	1953	
Sándor Nemes	Hungary	Austria	1925	
Ferenc Puskás	Hungary	Spain	1961	
Rezső Patkoló	Hungary	Poland	1949	
Iuliu Baratky	Hungary	Romania	1933	
Francisc Mészáros	Hungary	Romania	1946	
József Pecsovszky	Hungary	Romania	1945	
Zoltán Szaniszló	Hungary	Romania	1935	
Mátyás Tóth	Hungary	Romania	1945 (Note: Represented Hungary from 1939 to 1943, then represented Romania in 1946, then returned to representing Hungary in 1947 and 1948)	
Mátyás Tóth	Romania	Hungary	1947	
Jack Reynolds	Ireland	England	1892	
Cecil Moore	Ireland	United States	1953	
Giangos Simantiris	Israel	Greece	1961	
Roberto Porta	Italy	Uruguay	1937	
Jeff Cunningham	Jamaica	United States	2001	
Min Byung-dae	Japan	South Korea	1944	
Kim Yong-sik	Japan	South Korea	1948	
Lee Yoo-hyung	Japan	South Korea	1948	
Vladimir Niederhaus	Kazakhstan	Russia	1994 (Note: Represented Kazakhstan in 1992, then represented Russia in 1994, then returned to representing Kazakhstan)	
Vitaliy Kafanov	Kazakhstan	Turkmenistan	1996	
Mehmet Dragusha	Kosovo	Albania	2003	
Martín Vásquez	Mexico	United States	1996	
Dries Boussatta	Netherlands	Morocco	2001	
Pratap Shankar Hazra	Pakistan	Bangladesh	1973	
Zakaria Pintoo	Pakistan	Bangladesh	1973	
Shahidur Rahman Shantoo	Pakistan	Bangladesh	1973	
Balai Dey	Pakistan	India	1969	
Delfín Benítez Cáceres	Paraguay	Argentina	1934	
Constantino Urbieta Sosa	Paraguay	Argentina	1934	
Arturo Galarza	Paraguay	Bolivia	1977	
Heriberto Herrera	Paraguay	Spain	1957	
Eulogio Martínez	Paraguay	Spain	1959 (Note: Played for Spain B in 1958)	
Segundo Castillo	Peru	Chile	1941	
Pablo Pasache	Peru	Chile	1941 (Note: First represented Peru in 1938, then represented Chile in 1941, returning to Peru in 1942)	
Pablo Pasache	Chile	Peru	1942	
Julio Lores	Peru	Mexico	1935	
Juan Joya	Peru	Uruguay	1965	
Paulino Alcántara	Philippines	Spain	1921	
Ernst Wilimowski	Poland	Germany	1941 (Note: Represented Germany following Polish annexation by Nazi Germany in WWII)	
Stefan Szefer	Poland	United States	1973	
Chris Armas	Puerto Rico	United States	1998	
István Avar	Romania	Hungary	1929	
Iuliu Bodola	Romania	Hungary	1940	
Nicolae Kovács	Romania	Hungary	1941	
Adalbert Marksteiner	Romania	Hungary	1943	
Francisc Spielmann	Romania	Hungary	1940 (Note: Represented Romania from 1939 to 1940, then represented Hungary from 1940 to 1943, then returned to representing Romania from 1945 to 1949)	
Francisc Spielmann	Hungary	Romania	1945	
Albert Ströck	Romania	Hungary	1927	
Mihai Tänzer	Romania	Hungary	1929	
Pál Teleki	Romania	Hungary	1933	
Vladislav Lemish	Russia	Azerbaijan	1994	
Aleksei Bakharev	Russia	Ukraine	2002	
Oleksandr Horshkov	Russia	Ukraine	2003	
Sergei Kormiltsev	Russia	Ukraine	2000	
Juma Masudi	Rwanda	Burundi	1998	
Avondale Williams	Saint Vincent and the Grenadines	British Virgin Islands	2000	
Jock Aird	Scotland	New Zealand	1958	
Jack Marshall	Scotland	United States	1926	
Rose Reilly (female)	Scotland (women)	Italy (women)	1984	
Razali Alias	Singapore	Malaysia	1985	
Héctor Henman	South Africa	Argentina	1906	
Gordon Hodgson	South Africa	England	1930	
Jang Jung	South Korea	Singapore	1995	
Humphrey Mijnals	Suriname	Netherlands	1960	
Law Adam	Switzerland	Netherlands	1930	
Sergei Mandreko	Tajikistan (Note: Represented CIS prior to Tajikistan)	Russia	1994	
Mukhsin Mukhamadiev	Tajikistan	Russia	1995	
Rashid Rakhimov	Tajikistan	Russia	1994, 1996 (Note: Represented Tajikistan in 1992, then represented Russia in 1994 and 1995, then represented Tajikistan again in 1996)	
Alvin Corneal	Trinidad and Tobago	Barbados	1962 (Note: Totals may not be complete; Barbados joined FIFA in 1968, Trinidad and Tobado in 1964 (CONCACAF in 1962); it is possible he also played for British Guyana (before independence, not FIFA members at the time but affiliated to CONCACAF since 1961).)	
Alvin Corneal	Barbados	Trinidad and Tobago	1963	
Abdelkader Ghalem	Tunisia	Algeria	1964	
Yuriy Nikiforov	Ukraine (Note: Represented CIS before Ukraine)	Russia	1993	
Oleg Salenko	Ukraine	Russia	1993	
Akhrik Tsveiba	Ukraine (Note: Represented Soviet Union and CIS prior to Ukraine)	Russia	1997	
Ilya Tsymbalar	Ukraine	Russia	1994	
Andriy Khomyn	Ukraine	Turkmenistan	1998	
Robert Sidney Buck	Uruguay	Argentina	1912	
Eduardo García	Uruguay	Ecuador	1976	
Pedro Duhart	Uruguay	France	1935	
Alcides Ghiggia	Uruguay	Italy	1957	
Ricardo Faccio	Uruguay	Italy	1935	
Francisco Fedullo	Uruguay	Italy	1932	
Ernesto Mascheroni	Uruguay	Italy	1935 (Note: Uruguay from 1930 to 1934, then represented Italy in 1935 and 1936, then returned to representing Uruguay from 1936 to 1939)	
Ernesto Mascheroni	Italy	Uruguay	1936	
Juan Alberto Schiaffino	Uruguay	Italy	1954	
José Santamaría	Uruguay	Spain	1958	
Windsor del Llano	United States	Bolivia	1975	
Tony Bonezzi	United States	Israel	1961	
Barney Battles	United States	Scotland	1930	
Valery Kechinov	Uzbekistan	Russia	1994	
Andrey Pyatnitsky	Uzbekistan (Note: Represented Soviet Union and CIS prior to Uzbekistan)	Russia	1993	
Robert Evans	Wales	England	1911	
Sian Williams (female)	Wales (women)	England (women)	1992	
Ivan Bek	Yugoslavia	France	1935	
Vilmos Sipos	Yugoslavia	Hungary	1945	
Ján Podhradský	Yugoslavia	Slovakia	1942	
Kanku Mulekelayi	Zambia	DR Congo	2000	

== See also ==
- Cap-tied
- FIFA eligibility rules
