= 2021 Africa Cup of Nations qualification Group G =

Football tournament qualifying stage

Group G of the 2021 Africa Cup of Nations qualification tournament was one of the twelve groups that decided the teams which qualified for the 2021 Africa Cup of Nations finals tournament. The group consisted of four teams: Egypt, Kenya, Togo, and Comoros.

The teams played against each other in home-and-away round-robin format, originally scheduled between November 2019 and September 2020.

Due to the COVID-19 pandemic, all matches of matchdays 3 and 4 scheduled for March 2020 were postponed until further notice. FIFA recommended that all June 2020 international matches (matchday 5) be postponed, and also postponed the September 2020 window (matchday 6) for CAF.

On 30 June 2020, the CAF announced the 2021 Africa Cup of Nations final tournament had been postponed from January 2021 to January 2022, without announcing the new dates of the remaining qualifiers. On 19 August 2020, the CAF announced the new dates of the remaining qualifiers, with matchdays 3 and 4 rescheduled to be played between 9–17 November 2020, and matchdays 5 and 6 rescheduled to be played between 22 and 30 March 2021.

Egypt and Comoros, the group winners and runners-up respectively, qualified for the 2021 Africa Cup of Nations.

== Standings ==
| Pos | Team | Pld | W | D | L | GF | GA | GD | Pts | Qualification | Egypt | Comoros | Kenya | Togo |
|---|---|---|---|---|---|---|---|---|---|---|---|---|---|---|
| 1 | Egypt | 6 | 3 | 3 | 0 | 10 | 3 | +7 | 12 | Final tournament | — | 4–0 | 1–1 | 1–0 |
| 2 | Comoros | 6 | 2 | 3 | 1 | 4 | 6 | −2 | 9 | Final tournament | 0–0 | — | 2–1 | 0–0 |
| 3 | Kenya | 6 | 1 | 4 | 1 | 7 | 7 | 0 | 7 | | 1–1 | 1–1 | — | 1–1 |
| 4 | Togo | 6 | 0 | 2 | 4 | 3 | 8 | −5 | 2 | | 1–3 | 0–1 | 1–2 | — |

Source: CAF
Rules for classification: Tiebreakers

== Matches ==
14 November 2019
16:00 UTC+0

| Togo | 0–1 | Comoros |
|---|---|---|
| | Report | Selemani 51' |

Stade de Kégué, Lomé
Referee: Jean-Jacques Ndala (DR Congo)
14 November 2019
18:00 UTC+2

| Egypt | 1–1 | Kenya |
|---|---|---|
| Kahraba 42' | Report | Olunga 67' |

Borg El Arab Stadium, Alexandria
Referee: Sidi Alioum (Cameroon)

18 November 2019
16:00 UTC+3

| Comoros | 0–0 | Egypt |
|---|---|---|
| | Report |

Stade Omnisports de Malouzini, Moroni
Referee: Bienvenu Sinko (Ivory Coast)
18 November 2019
19:00 UTC+3

| Kenya | 1–1 | Togo |
|---|---|---|
| Omolo 35' | Report | Ouro-Sama 64' |

Moi International Sports Centre, Kasarani
Referee: Alhadi Allaou Mahamat (Chad)

11 November 2020
19:00 UTC+3

| Kenya | 1–1 | Comoros |
|---|---|---|
| Juma 65' | Report | M'Changama 26' |

Moi International Sports Centre, Kasarani
Referee: Mutaz Ibrahim (Libya)
14 November 2020
21:00 UTC+2

| Egypt | 1–0 | Togo |
|---|---|---|
| El-Winsh 53' | Report |

Cairo International Stadium, Cairo
Referee: Louis Hakizimana (Rwanda)

15 November 2020
19:00 UTC+3

| Comoros | 2–1 | Kenya |
|---|---|---|
| Ben 21'; Mattoir 49' | Report | Nyakeya 35' |

Stade Omnisports de Malouzini, Moroni
Referee: Bamlak Tessema Weyesa (Ethiopia)
17 November 2020
16:00 UTC+0

| Togo | 1–3 | Egypt |
|---|---|---|
| Nya-Vedji 90+3' | Report | Afsha 18'; Sherif 32'; Trézéguet 52' |

Stade de Kégué, Lomé
Referee: Issa Sy (Senegal)

25 March 2021
16:00 UTC+3

| Comoros | 0–0 | Togo |
|---|---|---|
| | Report |

Stade Omnisports de Malouzini, Moroni
Referee: Mashood Ssali (Uganda)
25 March 2021
19:00 UTC+3

| Kenya | 1–1 | Egypt |
|---|---|---|
| Abdallah 65' | Report | Afsha 2' |

Nyayo National Stadium, Nairobi
Referee: Thando Ndzandzeka (South Africa)

29 March 2021
18:00 UTC+2

| Egypt | 4–0 | Comoros |
|---|---|---|
| Elneny 15'; Sherif 17'; Salah 21', 25' | Report |

Cairo International Stadium, Cairo
Referee: Boubou Traore (Mali)
29 March 2021
16:00 UTC+0

| Togo | 1–2 | Kenya |
|---|---|---|
| Eninful 90+5' | Report | Abdallah 32'; M. Juma 66' (pen.) |

Stade de Kégué, Lomé
Referee: Raymond Coker (Sierra Leone)

== Goalscorers ==
There were 24 goals scored in 12 matches, for an average of 2 goals per match.

2 goals

- (Egypt) Afsha
- (Egypt) Mohamed Salah
- (Egypt) Mohamed Sherif
- (Kenya) Hassan Abdallah
- (Kenya) Masoud Juma

1 goal

- (Comoros) El Fardou Ben Nabouhane
- (Comoros) Youssouf M'Changama
- (Comoros) Faiz Mattoir
- (Comoros) Faïz Selemani
- (Egypt) Mohamed Elneny
- (Egypt) Mahmoud Hamdy
- (Egypt) Mahmoud Kahraba
- (Egypt) Trézéguet
- (Kenya) Cliff Nyakeya
- (Kenya) Michael Olunga
- (Kenya) Johanna Omolo
- (Togo) Elom Nya-Vedji
- (Togo) Henri Eninful
- (Togo) Hakim Ouro-Sama
