= Yannick Mukunzi =

Rwandan footballer

Personal information
- Date of birth: 2 October 1995 (age 31)
- Place of birth: Kigali, Rwanda
- Height: 1.75 m (5 ft 9 in)
- Position: Defensive midfielder

Team information
- Current team: Sandvikens IF
- Number: 19

Senior career*
Years	Team	Apps	(Gls)
2014–2017	APR FC Kigali		
2017–2020	Rayon Sports F.C.		
2019	→ Sandvikens IF (loan)	19	(0)
2020–	Sandvikens IF	75	(4)

International career^{‡}
2015–	Rwanda	42	(4)
- * Club domestic league appearances and goals as of 14 November 2024 ‡ National team caps and goals as of 20 June 2024

Yannick Mukunzi (born 2 October 1995) is a Rwandan footballer who plays as a midfielder for Sandvikens IF and the Rwanda national football team.

He joined Sandviken on loan from Rayon Sports F.C. in 2019, and ahead of the 2020 season the move was made permanent.

== International career ==
=== International goals ===
Scores and results list Rwanda's goal tally first.

No.	Date	Venue	Opponent	Score	Result	Competition
1.	7 June 2015	Amahoro Stadium, Kigali, Rwanda	Tanzania	?–0	2–0	Friendly
2.	19 August 2017	Stade Régional Nyamirambo, Kigali, Rwanda	Uganda	1–0	2–0	2018 African Nations Championship qualification
3.	5 September 2019	Stade Linité, Victoria, Seychelles	Seychelles	2–0	3–0	2022 FIFA World Cup qualification
4.	10 September 2019	Stade Régional Nyamirambo, Kigali, Rwanda	Seychelles	6–0	7–0	2022 FIFA World Cup qualification
