= Moussa Ghassoum =

Mauritanian footballer

Personal information
- Full name: Moussa Ould Ghassoum
- Place of birth: Mauritania

Team information
- Current team: Djibouti (manager)

Senior career*
Years	Team	Apps	(Gls)
- Nouadhibou

Managerial career
- 2007–2010: ASC Snim
- 2010–2016: Nouadhibou
- AS Port
- 2016–2019: Djibouti
- * Club domestic league appearances and goals

Moussa Ould Ghassoum (Arabic: موسى ولد قاسوم) is a former Mauritanian footballer who last managed Djibouti.

== Managerial career ==
In January 2010, Ghassoum was appointed manager of Mauritanian Premier League club Nouadhibou, following a spell at ASC Snim.

On 22 December 2016, Ghassoum was appointed manager of Djibouti.
