= UR La Louvière Centre =

Belgian football club

UR La Louviére Centre
- Full name: Union Royale La Louvière Centre
- Founded: 1922; 104 years ago
- Ground: Stade du Tivoli
- Capacity: 12,500
- Chairman: Huseyin Kazanci
- Manager: Xavier Robert
- League: Belgian Division 3
- 2025–26: Division 3 ACFF A, 5th of 17
- Website: http://www.urlc.be/

Union Royale La Louvière Centre is a Belgian association football club based in La Louvière, in the province of Hainaut. Created in 1922, the team competes in Belgian Division 3, the fifth tier of Belgian football after relegation from Belgian Division 2 in 2024–25.

== History ==
The club was founded in 1922. Home games were played at the Haine-Saint-Pierre stadium.

In 2011, it moved from Stade Raymond Dienne, Haine-Saint-Pierre to Stade du Tivoli, La Louvière as RAA Louviéroise went into liquidation in 2009.

The team was originally known as Union Royale Sportive du Centre or URS Centre but this was changed to the current name in 2011. It is playing in the third division A since 2008–09. The club is based in La Louvière in the Centre area. Due to the competition reform of 2016, the club began competing in the new Belgian Second Amateur Division, where the club finished fourth in the first season. In 2017, Racing Charleroi Couillet Fleurus took on the name RAAL La Louvière and moved to the city in order to restore the former glory of the defunct R.A.A. Louviéroise.

In the 2018–19 season, the club won the title of the Walloon division of the Second Amateur Division, which meant that it they won promotion to the third-tier Belgian First Amateur Division. Due to the COVID-19 pandemic, the competition was canceled after 24 matchdays. At that time, the club was in fourteenth place, which meant that they would be relegated to Second Amateur Division. However, in the end, there were several professional clubs that did not receive a licence for professional football and had to relegate to the Belgian Second Amateur Division, and thus the club remained in the third tier.

The club changed their logo in May 2020, and the bird and crown became dark blue instead of green. It was decided in May 2020 to change the club name to La Louvière Centre, thereby eliminating the addition "Union Royale". According to the board, the letters "URLC" had become synonymous its negative past of financial struggles.

== Current squad ==
As of 27 January 2022

Note: Flags indicate national team as defined under FIFA eligibility rules; some limited exceptions apply. Players may hold more than one non-FIFA nationality.

No.	Pos.	Nation	Player
2	DF	FRA	Mansour Diallo
4	MF	FRA	Amadou Diakhaté
5	DF	FRA	Christopher Luhaka
6	MF	CIV	Armand Blaide
7	MF	POR	Eugénio Pina
—	FW	FRA	Sofiene Lekehal
9	FW	FRA	Amadou Ba
—	FW	FRA	Saïf Sakhi
11	MF	BEL	Marino Di Chiello
12	FW	BEL	Yassin Aydouni
14	FW	BEL	Ivan Prokhorov
15	FW	BEL	Laurent Van Der Goten

No.	Pos.	Nation	Player
19	MF	FRA	Ahmed Bouchentouf
20	MF	FRA	Yann Nkou
21	MF	FRA	Yacine Bentayeb
22	FW	GUF	Marc-Antoine Fortuné
24	MF	BEL	Stéphane Mukala
25	MF	BEL	Brahime Kaba
—	MF	FRA	Bradley Mbuta
27	FW	BEL	Deniz Bil
—	FW	BEL	William Fonkeu
29	MF	DJI	Haroun Mohamed
31	GK	COD	Sébastien Fuakuingi
71	FW	BEL	Tyron Crame
