= Michael Habte =

Eritrean footballer

Personal information
- Full name: Michael Habte Gebremeksel
- Date of birth: 21 August 2000 (age 26)
- Place of birth: Essex, England
- Position: Midfielder

Team information
- Current team: Adulis Club

Senior career*
| Years | Team | Apps | (Gls) |
| 2016–2018 | Dartford | 7 | (0) |
| 2019– | Adulis Club | | |

International career^{‡}
| 2019– | Eritrea | 6 | (1) |
- * Club domestic league appearances and goals ‡ National team caps and goals as of 14:28, 11 August 2021 (UTC)

Michael Habte (born 21 August 2000) is an Eritrean footballer who plays for Adulis Club of the Eritrean Premier League, and the Eritrea national team.

== Club career ==
Born in England, Habte began playing football at age eight. He came up through the academy system of Dartford F.C. before earning promotion to the first team in the National League South for the 2016–17 season. He made a total of seven appearances for the club before departing following the 2017–18 season. Following his departure from Dartford, he joined Adulis Club of the Eritrean Premier League to gain the attention of the Eritrean National Football Federation.

== International career ==
Habte played at the youth level for Eritrea in a friendly against South Sudan in December 2018. In September 2019 he was part of the Eritrea squad for the 2019 CECAFA U-20 Championship. He scored in a 7–0 Group Stage victory over Djibouti en route to a third-place finish in the tournament.

He made his senior international debut on 11 December 2019 in a 2019 CECAFA Cup match against Uganda. He went on to score his first international goal in the semi-finals of the tournament in a 4–1 victory over Kenya. Eritrea went on to finish as surprise runners-up of the tournament. In July 2021, Habte was part of Eritrea's squad for the 2021 CECAFA U-23 Challenge Cup. He was in the starting lineup for the team's second match, an eventual 0–3 defeat to Burundi.

== Career statistics ==
=== International goals ===
Scores and results list Eritrea's goal tally first.

| No | Date | Venue | Opponent | Score | Result | Competition |
|---|---|---|---|---|---|---|
| 1. | 17 December 2019 | Lugogo Stadium, Kampala, Uganda | Kenya | 3–1 | 4–1 | 2019 CECAFA Cup |
Last updated 17 July 2021

=== International career statistics ===
As of match played 20 January 2020.

Eritrea national team
| Year | Apps | Goals |
|---|---|---|
| 2019 | 5 | 1 |
| 2020 | 1 | 0 |
| Total | 6 | 1 |
