= Innocent Mbonihankuye =

Djiboutian footballer

Personal information
- Full name: Innocent Madede Mbonihankuye
- Date of birth: 5 November 1996 (age 29)
- Place of birth: Gitega, Burundi
- Height: 1.85 m (6 ft 1 in)
- Position: Goalkeeper

Team information
- Current team: ASAS
- Number: 16

Senior career*
Years	Team	Apps	(Gls)
2013–2015	LLB Académic		
2015–2019	Université de Djibouti	34	(0)
2019–2020	AS ESD	14	(0)
2020–2022	AS Port	25	(0)
2022-	ASAS	21	(0)

International career^{‡}
2014	Burundi	2	(0)
2019–2023	Djibouti	25	(0)
- * Club domestic league appearances and goals as of 6 September 2021 ‡ National team caps and goals as of 17 June 2023

Innocent Madede Mbonihankuye (born 5 November 1996) is a professional footballer who plays as a goalkeeper for AS Port. Born in Burundi and emigrated to Djibouti, he represented the Burundi national team in two friendlies, before switching to represent the Djibouti national team.

== Career ==
Born in Burundi, Mbonihankuye debuted with the Burundi national team in a friendly 0–0 tie with Kenya on 15 July 2014. In 2015, he moved to Djibouti and was naturalized as a citizen. He switched to represent Djibouti in 2019, as he was not cap tied to Burundi due to only playing 2 friendlies with them. He debuted with Djibouti in a 2–1 2022 FIFA World Cup qualification win over Eswatini on 4 September 2019.

== Honours ==
LLB Académic

- Burundi Premier League: 2013-14
