= Haroun Mohamed =

French/Djiboutian footballer (born 1998)

Personal information
- Full name: Haroun Kadamy Youssouf
- Date of birth: 11 April 1998 (age 28)
- Place of birth: Paris, France
- Height: 1.90 m (6 ft 3 in)
- Positions: Midfielder; center back

Team information
- Current team: STADE MOUSCRONNOIS
- Number: 93

Youth career
- Paris Fc: Paris Fc

Senior career*
Years	Team	Apps	(Gls)
2017–2018	Râmnicu Vâlcea		
2018	Admira Landhaus		
2019–2020	ES Cesson VSD		
2020	CO Vincennes		
2020–2024	La Louvière Centre	30	(3)
2025-	La Louvière Centre		

International career^{‡}
2019–	Djibouti	6	(1)
- * Club domestic league appearances and goals as of 29 May 2025 ‡ National team caps and goals as of 29 May 2025

Haroun Kadamy Youssouf (born 11 April 1998), commonly known as Haroun Mohamed, is a French-Djiboutian professionnel footballer who plays as a midfielder for Belgian club La Louvière Centre and the Djibouti national team

== Club career ==
In January 2020, Mohamed moved from ES Cesson VSD to CO Vincennes. By January 2021, he had moved on to La Louvière Centre in the Belgian National Division 1.

== International career ==
Mohamed made his senior international debut on 7 December 2019, in a 2019 CECAFA Cup match against Somalia. Eight days later he scored his first international goal in the same tournament, Djibouti's only goal in a 4–1 defeat to Uganda. At the time, he was one of only two Djibouti internationals playing abroad, along with Warsama Hassan.

== Career statistics ==
=== International ===
As of match played 15 December 2019

Appearances and goals by national team and year
National team	Year	Apps	Goals
Djibouti	2014	4	1
Total		4	1

Scores and results list Djibouti's goal tally first, score column indicates score after each Mohamed goal.

List of international goals scored by Haroun Mohamed
No.	Date	Venue	Opponent	Score	Result	Competition	Ref.
1	15 December 2019	Lugogo Stadium, Kampala, Uganda	Uganda	1–2	1–4	2019 CECAFA Cup	
