= Noureddine Gharsalli =

Tunisian football manager

Personal information
- Date of birth: 11 August 1955 (age 71)
- Place of birth: Tunisia

Managerial career
- Years: Team
- 2011–2016: Djibouti

Noureddine Gharsalli (born 11 August 1955) is a Tunisian professional football manager, and former player.

== Career ==
=== As a player ===
He played for AS Kasserine.

=== As a manager ===
He coached AS Kasserine, ES Zarzis, AS Gabès, and ES Métlaoui. Since 2011, he has been coaching the Djibouti national football team.
