= Muhadjiri Hakizimana =

Rwandan footballer

Hakizimana Muhadjiri
Personal information
- Date of birth: 13 August 1994 (age 32)
- Place of birth: Rwanda
- Position: Midfielder

Senior career*
Years	Team	Apps	(Gls)
2010-2012	Etincelles		
2012-2015	Kiyovu		
2015-2016	Mukura Victory		
2016-2019	Armée Patriotique Rwandaise		
2019–2020	Emirates		
2020–2021	AS Kigali		
2021–2022	Police FC		
2022–2023	Al-Kholood		
2023-2026	Police FC		

International career
2016–	Rwanda	22	(4)
- * Club domestic league appearances and goals

Hakizimana Muhadjiri (born 13 August 1994) also known as "HD" is a Rwandan professional footballer who plays for the Rwandan national team.

== Career ==
=== Club ===
On 26 June 2022, Hakizimana joined Saudi Arabian club Al-Kholood.

=== International ===
He debuted internationally on 3 November 2016 for the 2017 Africa Cup of Nations qualification and scored his first goal against Ghana in a 1-1 draw.

At the 2022 FIFA World Cup qualification, he scored two goals in each leg in two consecutive victories against Seychelles.

== Career statistics ==
=== International goals ===
Scores and results list Rwanda's goal tally first.

No.	Date	Venue	Opponent	Score	Result	Competition
1.	5 September 2019	Stade Linité, Victoria, Seychelles	Seychelles	1–0	3–0	2022 FIFA World Cup qualification
2.	10 September 2019	Stade Régional Nyamirambo, Kigali, Rwanda	Seychelles	7–0	7–0	2022 FIFA World Cup qualification

== Honours ==
=== Individual ===
- Rwanda Premier League player of the year: 2018
