= Hassan Abdallah =

Kenyan footballer (born 1996)

Personal information
- Full name: Hassan Abdallah Hassan
- Date of birth: 6 July 1996 (age 30)
- Place of birth: Ziwani, Kenya
- Height: 1.80 m (5 ft 11 in)
- Position: Defender

Team information
- Current team: Bandari

Senior career*
Years	Team	Apps	(Gls)
2016–	Bandari		

International career^{‡}
2018–	Kenya	19	(6)
- * Club domestic league appearances and goals ‡ National team caps and goals as of 5 July 2026

Hassan Abdallah (born 6 July 1996) is a Kenyan footballer who plays as a defender for Bandari and the Kenya national team.

== International career ==
Abdallah made his debut for Kenya on 11 September 2018 against Malawi.

== Career statistics ==
=== International ===
Statistics accurate as of match played 14 June 2023.

Kenya
Year	Apps	Goals
2018	1	0
2019	5	3
2020	2	0
2021	10	3
2022	–	
2023	1	0
Total	19	6

==== International goals ====
Scores and results Kenya's goal tally first.

No.	Date	Venue	Opponent	Score	Result	Competition
1.	8 December 2019	Lugogo Stadium, Kampala, Uganda	Tanzania	1–0	1–0	2019 CECAFA Cup
2.	10 December 2019	Lugogo Stadium, Kampala, Uganda	Sudan	1–1	2–1	2019 CECAFA Cup
3.	19 December 2019	Lugogo Stadium, Kampala, Uganda	Tanzania	2–0	2–1	2019 CECAFA Cup
4.	15 March 2021	Nyayo National Stadium, Nairobi, Kenya	Tanzania	2–1	2–1	Friendly
5.	25 March 2021	Nyayo National Stadium, Nairobi, Kenya	Egypt	1–1	1–1	2021 Africa Cup of Nations qualification
6.	29 March 2021	Stade de Kégué, Lomé, Togo	Togo	1–0	2–1	2021 Africa Cup of Nations qualification
