= Ahmed Daher =

Djiboutian international footballer

Personal information
- Full name: Ahmed Hassan Daher
- Date of birth: October 17, 1982 (age 44)
- Place of birth: Djibouti
- Position: Striker

Senior career*
Years	Team	Apps	(Gls)
2004–20xx	KF Çlirimi		
20xx–20xx	Ein Karem		

International career
2007–2009	Djibouti	13	(3)
- * Club domestic league appearances and goals

Ahmed Daher (Somali: Axmed Daahir), is a Djiboutian international footballer who plays as a striker.

Daher was the leading scorer for the Djibouti national football team before being overtaken by Mahdi Houssein Mahabeh in 2019. He debuted against Uganda in 2007 and played in three qualifying matches for the 2010 FIFA World Cup.

== International goals ==
Scores and results list Djibouti's goal tally first.

#	Date	Venue	Opponent	Score	Result	Competition
1.	11 December 2007	National Stadium, Dar es Salaam, Tanzania	Eritrea	1–2	2–3	2007 CECAFA Cup
2.	31 May 2008	Kamuzu Stadium, Blantyre, Malawi	Malawi	1–2	1–8	2010 FIFA World Cup qualification
3.	4 January 2009	Bugembe Stadium, Jinja, Uganda	Sudan	1–1	1–1	2008 CECAFA Cup
