= Brayan López (footballer, born 1990) =

Nicaraguan footballer (born 1990)

Personal information
- Full name: Brayan Steven López Ramírez
- Date of birth: 6 June 1990 (age 36)
- Place of birth: Alajuela, Costa Rica
- Height: 1.72 m (5 ft 8 in)
- Position: Midfielder

Team information
- Current team: Puntarenas
- Number: 22

Youth career
- A.D. Carmelita

Senior career*
Years	Team	Apps	(Gls)
2008–2013	A.D. Carmelita	47	(4)
2013–2014	C.S. Cartaginés	22	(0)
2014	→ Belén F.C. (loan)	21	(3)
2015–2017	Belén F.C.	98	(15)
2017	Alajuelense	7	(0)
2018	Pérez Zeledón	18	(0)
2018–2021	Santos de Guápiles	127	(20)
2022–2023	Sporting San José	35	(6)
2023–	Puntarenas	31	(0)

International career^{‡}
2020	Costa Rica	2	(0)
2022–2024	Nicaragua	11	(0)
- * Club domestic league appearances and goals as of 5 May 2024 ‡ National team caps and goals as of 26 March 2024

Brayan Steven López Ramírez (born 6 June 1990) is a footballer who plays as a midfielder for Liga FPD club Puntarenas. López represented both Costa Rica and Nicaragua national football teams during his professional career.

== Early life ==
López was born to a Costa Rican mother and a Nicaraguan father. He played developed in the system of AD Carmelita.

== Club career ==
In 2008, at age 18, he made his debut with AD Carmelita in the Primera División of Costa Rica, scoring 4 goals and adding 6 assists in 49 games over four seasons, featuring mainly in the 2012/13 season, when he made 41 appearances.

In the summer of 2013, he moved to CS Cartaginés on a two-year contract.

In July 2014, he was sent on loan to Belén FC. Upon the conclusion of his loan, he did not return to Cartaginés for their pre-season, as he wished to leave the club. He later returned to Belén on a permanent deal.

In 2017, he moved to Alajuelense, where he stayed for a short spell.

In January 2018, he moved to Pérez Zeledón

Later in 2018, he moved to Santos de Guápiles.

In 2022, he joined Sporting San José.

== International career ==
=== Costa Rica ===
In December 2015, López was called up to the Costa Rica national team ahead of a friendly against Nicaragua. In October 2020, López was called up to the national team ahead of friendlies against Panama. He made his debut on October 11 as a substitute.

After being tired of waiting for another Costa Rica call-up, López decided to switch affiliations to Nicaragua, as he had only appeared in friendlies with Costa Rica.

=== Nicaragua ===
In November 2021, he was called up to the Nicaragua national team ahead of friendlies against Cuba. However, he was forced to withdraw from the squad after suffering an injury with his club team in a CONCACAF League match against Canadian club Forge FC.
