= Hakim Ouro-Sama =

Togolese footballer

Personal information
- Date of birth: 28 December 1997 (age 28)
- Place of birth: Agbodrafo, Togo
- Height: 1.85 m (6 ft 1 in)
- Position: Centre-back

Team information
- Current team: Lille B

Youth career
- Liberty Sport d'Agbodrafo

Senior career*
Years	Team	Apps	(Gls)
2016–2018	AS Togo-Port		
2018–	Lille B	25	(1)
2019–2020	→ Belenenses SAD (loan)	4	(0)
2021–2022	→ Bastia-Borgo (loan)	7	(0)

International career^{‡}
2014	Togo U20	4	(0)
2016–	Togo	23	(1)
- * Club domestic league appearances and goals as of 05:08, 26 May 2022 (UTC) ‡ National team caps and goals as of 05:08, 26 May 2022 (UTC)

Hakim Ouro-Sama (born 28 December 1997) is a Togolese professional footballer who plays as a centre-back for French club Lille reserve team, which plays in Championnat National 3, and the Togo national team.

== Club career ==
On 4 July 2018, Ouro-Sama joined French Ligue 1 club Lille on five-year deal. In the summer 2019, Ouro-Sama was loaned out to Portuguese club Belenenses SAD for the rest of the season. However, Ouro-Sama played only 52 minutes in the Primeira Liga and four games for the U23 team, before he was recalled on 6 February 2020.

On 7 December 2021, Ouro-Sama was loaned to Bastia-Borgo.

== International career ==
Ouro-Sama represented the Togo under-20 in the 2015 Orange African U-20 Cup of Nations in all four of their qualifying games against Morocco and Mali in 2014.

He played his first game for Togo's senior team on 4 October 2016 in a friendly against Uganda and was selected for the nation's squad for the 2017 Africa Cup of Nations.

=== International goals ===
Scores and results list the Togo's goal tally first.

No.	Date	Venue	Opponent	Score	Result	Competition
1.	18 November 2019	Moi International Sports Centre, Nairobi, Kenya	Kenya	1–1	1–1	2021 Africa Cup of Nations qualification
