= Mohamed Abar =

Djiboutian football manager

Personal information
- Full name: Mohamed Elmi Abar
- Date of birth: c. 20th century
- Place of birth: Djibouti

Managerial career
- Years: Team
- 2008: Djibouti

Mohamed Elmi Abar is a Djiboutian professional football manager. From May to October 2008, he coached Djibouti national football team.
