= Jonathan Richard =

Aruban footballer

Personal information
- Full name: Jonathan Jordan Richard
- Date of birth: 21 June 1991 (age 35)
- Place of birth: Amsterdam, Netherlands
- Height: 1.80 m (5 ft 11 in)
- Position: Centre-back

Team information
- Current team: ADO '20
- Number: 12

Youth career
- 2008–2010: AFC

Senior career*
Years	Team	Apps	(Gls)
2010–2011	AFC	3	(0)
2011–2014	OFC		
2014–2020	AFC	149	(8)
2020–2021	VV HBOK		
2021	GVVV	8	(0)
2022–2023	JOS Watergraafsmeer	20	(0)
2023–2024	ODIN '59	19	(1)
2024–	ADO '20	10	(0)

International career
2015	Curaçao	1	(0)
2021–2024	Aruba	8	(0)
- * Club domestic league appearances and goals as of 4 August 2025

Jonathan Jordan Richard (born 21 June 1991) is a professional footballer who plays as a centre back for ADO '20. Born in the Netherlands, Richard represented the Curaçao national team in 2015, before switching to represent the Aruba national team.

== Career ==
=== AFC ===
Returning to AFC Amsterdam in 2014, Richard was praised by their coach Willem Leushuis for his effervescent and sociable personality, netting two goals in two games in a row as well.

=== International ===
Making his first outing for the Curaçao national team in a 2015 unofficial friendly fronting Suriname, Richard was selected for the Curaçao squad in their two 2018 World Cup qualifiers facing Cuba. He made his debut in competitive games on 2 June 2021, starting for Aruba in the match against Cayman Islands in 2022 FIFA World Cup qualification.
