= Daoud Wais =

Djiboutian footballer

Personal information
- Full name: Wais Daoud Wais
- Date of birth: 6 December 1986 (age 39)
- Place of birth: Djibouti, Djibouti
- Height: 1.73 m (5 ft 8 in)
- Position: Defender

Team information
- Current team: Arta/Solar7
- Number: 26

Senior career*
| Years | Team | Apps | (Gls) |
| 2010–2020 | ASAS Djibouti Télécom | | |
| 2020– | Arta/Solar7 | | |

International career^{‡}
| 2008–2021 | Djibouti | 34 | (1) |
- * Club domestic league appearances and goals ‡ National team caps and goals as of 19:31, 10 February 2023 (UTC)

Wais Daoud Wais (born 6 December 1986) is a Djiboutian professional footballer who plays as a defender for Djibouti Premier League club Arta/Solar7.

== Career statistics ==
=== International ===
As of 10 February 2023

Appearances and goals by national team and year
| National team | Year | Apps | Goals |
|---|---|---|---|
| Djibouti | 2008 | 4 | 0 |
| Djibouti | 2009 | 0 | 0 |
| Djibouti | 2010 | 0 | 0 |
| Djibouti | 2011 | 3 | 0 |
| Djibouti | 2012 | 0 | 0 |
| Djibouti | 2013 | 0 | 0 |
| Djibouti | 2014 | 0 | 0 |
| Djibouti | 2015 | 9 | 0 |
| Djibouti | 2016 | 4 | 0 |
| Djibouti | 2017 | 4 | 0 |
| Djibouti | 2018 | 0 | 0 |
| Djibouti | 2019 | 5 | 1 |
| Djibouti | 2020 | 0 | 0 |
| Djibouti | 2021 | 5 | 0 |
| Total | | 34 | 1 |

Scores and results list Djibouti's goal tally first, score column indicates score after each Wais goal.

List of international goals scored by Daoud Wais
| No. | Date | Venue | Opponent | Score | Result | Competition | Ref. |
|---|---|---|---|---|---|---|---|
| 1 | 23 November 2019 | El Hadj Hassan Gouled Aptidon Stadium, Djibouti, Djibouti | Mauritius | 2–0 | 3–0 | Friendly | |
