= Hamza Abdi Idleh =

Djiboutian footballer (born 1991)

Personal information
- Full name: Abdi Idleh Hamza
- Date of birth: 16 December 1991 (age 34)
- Place of birth: Djibouti
- Height: 1.78 m (5 ft 10 in)
- Position: Midfielder

Team information
- Current team: FC Dikhil/SGDT

Senior career*
Years	Team	Apps	(Gls)
2015–2018	ASAS Djibouti Télécom		
2018–2021	AS Port		
2021–	FC Dikhil/SGDT		

International career^{‡}
2016–	Djibouti	22	(2)
- * Club domestic league appearances and goals ‡ National team caps and goals as of 10 February 2023

Hamza Abdi Idleh (born on 16 December 1991) is a Djiboutian footballer who plays as a midfielder for FC Dikhil/SGDT and the Djibouti national team.

== International career ==
Hamza debuted on 22 March 2017, in the qualification match of the 2019 Africa Cup of Nations and scored his first goal against South Sudan in a 2–0 victory. On 4 September 2019, he appeared in the 2022 FIFA World Cup qualification and scored his second goal against Eswatini in a 2–1 victory.

== Career statistics ==
=== International ===
Scores and results list Djibouti's goal tally first.

No.	Date	Venue	Opponent	Score	Result	Competition
1.	22 March 2017	El Hadj Hassan Gouled Aptidon Stadium, Djibouti City, Djibouti	South Sudan	1–0	2–0	2019 Africa Cup of Nations qualification
2.	4 September 2019	El Hadj Hassan Gouled Aptidon Stadium, Djibouti City, Djibouti	Eswatini	2–1	2–1	2022 FIFA World Cup qualification
