= Elom Nya-Vedji =

Togolese footballer

Personal information
- Full name: Elom Kodjo Nya-Vedji
- Date of birth: 24 November 1997 (age 28)
- Place of birth: Vogan, Togo
- Height: 1.65 m (5 ft 5 in)
- Position: Winger

Team information
- Current team: Prishtina e Re
- Number: 82

Senior career*
Years	Team	Apps	(Gls)
2016–2019	Planète Foot Lomé		
2019	Rudar Pljevlja	17	(3)
2020–2021	Zeta	27	(7)
2021	Vllaznia Shkodër	13	(0)
2021–2022	Viagem Ústí nad Labem	0	(0)
2022–2023	OFK Grbalj	21	(3)
2023–2026	Malisheva	20	(3)
2026–	Prishtina e Re	12	(1)

International career^{‡}
2017–	Togo	9	(2)
- * Club domestic league appearances and goals as of 22 June 2026 ‡ National team caps and goals as of 19:53, 25 March 2024 (UTC)

Elom Kodjo Nya-Vedji (born 24 November 1997) is a Togolese professional footballer who plays as a winger for Kosovan club Prishtina e Re.

== Career ==
Nya-Vedji has played club football for Planète Foot Lomé, Rudar Pljevlja, Zeta, Vllaznia Shkodër, Viagem Ústí nad Labem, OFK Grbalj and Malisheva.

He made his international debut on 4 June 2017 for Togo against Comoros.
