= Mohamed Liban =

Djiboutian footballer

Personal information
- Full name: Mohamed Issa Liban
- Date of birth: 30 October 1985 (age 41)
- Place of birth: Djibouti
- Position: Midfielder

Senior career*
Years	Team	Apps	(Gls)
2007–2010	Garde Républicaine		
2010–2014	Dynamos		
2014–20xx	Garde Républicaine		

International career^{‡}
2008–2015	Djibouti	15	(2)
- * Club domestic league appearances and goals as of 23:02, 15 September 2015 (UTC) ‡ National team caps and goals as of 23:02, 8 February 2017 (UTC)

Mohamed Issa Liban (born 30 October 1985) is a Djiboutian footballer who plays as a midfielder.

== International career ==
=== International goals ===
Scores and results list Djibouti's goal tally first.

No	Date	Venue	Opponent	Score	Result	Competition
1.	12 June 2015	Stade Olympique de Radès, Radès, Tunisia	Tunisia	1–4	1–8	2017 Africa Cup of Nations qualification
2.	17 October 2015	Somhlolo National Stadium, Lobamba, Swaziland	Swaziland	1–1	1–2	2018 FIFA World Cup qualification
