= Bright Anukani =

Ugandan footballer (born 2000)

Personal information
- Date of birth: 26 June 2000 (age 26)
- Place of birth: Kampala, Uganda
- Height: 1.74 m (5 ft 8 1/2 in)
- Position: Midfielder

Team information
- Current team: KCCA

Senior career*
Years	Team	Apps	(Gls)
2018–2020	Proline	19	(3)
2020–2021	KCCA	18	(4)
2021–2024	Vipers	71	(9)
2024–	KCCA	22	(4)

International career^{‡}
2019–	Uganda	18	(3)
- * Club domestic league appearances and goals as of 11:50, 24 March 2026 (UTC) ‡ National team caps and goals as of 23:54, 14 February 2021 (UTC)

Bright Anukani (born 26 June 2000) is a Ugandan footballer who plays as a midfielder for Uganda Premier League club KCCA and the Uganda national football team.

== Club career ==
He joined KCCA in summer 2020.
