= Yonis Kireh =

Djibouti footballer (born 2002)

Personal information
- Full name: Yonis Abdi Kireh
- Date of birth: 10 May 2002 (age 24)
- Place of birth: Marseille, France
- Height: 1.90 m (6 ft 3 in)
- Position: Defender

Team information
- Current team: Gazélec Ajaccio

Youth career
- –2020: AS Mazargues Marseille
- 2020–2021: SMUC
- 2021–2022: Zamora

College career
Years	Team	Apps	(Gls)
2024	Virginia Tech Hokies	8	(2)
2025	Tulsa Golden Hurricane	5	(0)

Senior career*
Years	Team	Apps	(Gls)
2022–2023	Puente Genil	13	(0)
2023–2024	FC Rousset SVO	1	(0)
2026–	Gazélec Ajaccio	2	(0)

International career^{‡}
2025–	Djibouti	2	(0)
- * Club domestic league appearances and goals as of 12:44, 2 April 2025 (UTC) ‡ National team caps and goals as of 12:44, 2 April 2025 (UTC)

Yonis Abdi Kireh (born 10 May 2002) is a professional footballer who plays for Championnat National 3 club Gazélec Ajaccio. Born in France, he plays for the Djibouti national team.

== Club career ==
As a youth in France, Kireh came up through the youth ranks at Olympique de Marseille before traveling to Spain to join the reserve team of Zamora CF in 2021. He regularly trained with the club's first team of the Segunda Federación. Remaining in Spain, it was announced in July 2022 that the player had joined Puente Genil FC. In August 2024, after playing two seasons with the Andalusian club, it was announced that Kireh had committed to playing college soccer in the United States for the Virginia Tech Hokies.

== International career ==
Born in Marseille, France, Kireh was called-up to the Djibouti national team for the first time for two 2026 FIFA World Cup qualification matches in March 2025. He made his international debut against Burkina Faso on 21 March 2025.

=== International career statistics ===
As of match played 24 March 2025.

Djibouti national team
Year	Apps	Goals
2025	2	0
Total	2	0
