= Esey Tesfay =

Eritrean footballer

Personal information
- Full name: Essey Tesfay Gebrezgabhr
- Date of birth: 20 July 1996 (age 30)
- Place of birth: Asmara, Eritrea
- Height: 1.85 m (6 ft 1 in)
- Position: Midfielder

Team information
- Current team: Asmara Brewery

Senior career*
Years	Team	Apps	(Gls)
- Asmara Brewery

International career
2019–	Eritrea	1	(0)
- * Club domestic league appearances and goals

Esfey Tesfay (born 20 July 1996) is an Eritrean footballer who plays for the Eritrean national team. He debuted on 4 September 2019, in a 2022 FIFA World Cup qualification and scored an own goal against Namibia in 1-2 defeat.
