= Eugene Swen =

Liberian footballer

Personal information
- Full name: Eugene Chouchou Swen
- Date of birth: 18 November 1999 (age 26)
- Place of birth: Liberia
- Position: Defender

Team information
- Current team: Paynesville FC

Youth career
- 2016–2017: Barrack Young Controllers

Senior career*
Years	Team	Apps	(Gls)
2017–2019	Barrack Young Controllers		
2019	Energetik-BGU Minsk	11	(0)
2020–2021	Bea Mountain		
2021–2023	Up Country Lions		
2024–	Paynesville FC		

International career^{‡}
2018–	Liberia	6	(0)
- * Club domestic league appearances and goals as of 31 December 2019 ‡ National team caps and goals as of 28 December 2024

Eugene Chouchou Swen (born 18 November 1999) is a Liberian professional footballer who plays for Paynesville FC.

== Career statistics ==
=== International ===
As of match played 28 December 2024

Appearances and goals by national team and year
National team	Year	Apps	Goals
Liberia	2018	1	0
Liberia	2019	3	0
Liberia	2024	2	0
Total		6	0
