= Gadiel Kamagi =

Tanzanian footballer

Personal information
- Full name: Gabriel Gadiel Michael Kamagi
- Date of birth: 12 September 1996 (age 30)
- Place of birth: Tanga, Tanzania
- Height: 1.78 m (5 ft 10 in)
- Position: Defender

Team information
- Current team: Singida Black Stars

Youth career
- Azam

Senior career*
Years	Team	Apps	(Gls)
2014–2017	Azam		
2017–2019	Young Africans		
2019–2023	Simba		
2023–2024	Singida Fountain Gate	12	(2)
2024	→ Cape Town Spurs (loan)	12	(2)
2024–2025	Chippa United	3	(0)
2025–	Singida Black Stars		

International career^{‡}
2017–2019	Tanzania	35	(2)
- * Club domestic league appearances and goals as of 16 March 2025 ‡ National team caps and goals as of 16 March 2025

Gabriel Gadiel Michael Kamagi (born 12 September 1996) is a Tanzanian football player who plays for Singida Black Stars.

In 2024, he moved abroad to South African club Cape Town Spurs on loan. After Cape Town Spurs became relegated, Kamagi signed for Chippa United in August 2024. In January 2025 he started training with Singida Black Stars of his homecountry, also joining the team permanently.

== International ==
He made his Tanzania national football team debut on 10 June 2017 in an AFCON qualifier against Lesotho.

He was selected for the 2019 Africa Cup of Nations squad.

=== International goals ===
Scores and results Tanzania's goal tally first.

No.	Date	Venue	Opponent	Score	Result	Competition
1.	19 December 2019	Lugogo Stadium, Kampala, Uganda	Tanzania	1–2	1–2	2019 CECAFA Cup
