= Ditram Nchimbi =

Tanzanian footballer

Personal information
- Full name: Ditram Adrian Nchimbi
- Date of birth: 10 March 1997 (age 29)
- Place of birth: Tunduru, Tanzania
- Height: 1.75 m (5 ft 9 in)
- Position: Forward

Team information
- Current team: Geita Gold Mine FC

Senior career*
Years	Team	Apps	(Gls)
2014–205	Maji Maji		
2016–2017	Mbeya City		
2017–2018	Njombe Mji		
2018–2019	Azam		
2019	Polisi		
2020–	Young Africans		
- Geita

International career^{‡}
2019–	Tanzania	9	(2)
- * Club domestic league appearances and goals as of 1 August 2020 ‡ National team caps and goals as of 1 August 2020

Ditram Nchimbi (born 10 March 1997) is a Tanzanian football striker who plays for Geita Gold Mine FC.
