= Mahdi Houssein Mahabeh =

Djiboutian footballer (born 1995)

Personal information
- Full name: Mahdi Houssein Mahabeh
- Date of birth: 20 December 1995 (age 30)
- Place of birth: Djibouti
- Height: 1.70 m (5 ft 7 in)
- Position: Forward

Team information
- Current team: Arta/Solar7
- Number: 30

Senior career*
Years	Team	Apps	(Gls)
2018–2022	ASAS Djibouti Télécom		
2022–	Arta/Solar7	13	(8)

International career^{‡}
2016–	Djibouti	26	(7)
- * Club domestic league appearances and goals as of 15 December 2023 ‡ National team caps and goals as of 9 February 2023

Mahdi Houssein Mahabeh (born on 20 December 1995) is a Djiboutian professional footballer who plays as a forward for Arta/Solar7 and the Djibouti national team.

== International career ==
Mahabeh debuted internationally on 3 June 2016 in a 2017 African Cup of Nations qualifier and scored his first goal for Djibouti in a 4–3 away loss against Ethiopia.

Mahabeh also appeared in the 2021 Africa Cup of Nations qualification as he scored a penalty goal against Gambia resulting a draw at 1–1.

== Career statistics ==
=== International goals ===
Scores and results list Djibouti's goal tally first.

No.	Date	Venue	Opponent	Score	Result	Competition
1.	4 August 2019	Dire Dawa Stadium, Dire Dawa, Ethiopia	Ethiopia	3–3	3–4	2020 African Nations Championship qualification
2.	4 September 2019	El Hadj Hassan Gouled Aptidon Stadium, Djibouti City, Djibouti	Eswatini	1–0	2–1	2022 FIFA World Cup qualification
3.	13 October 2019	Independence Stadium, Bakau, Gambia	Gambia	1–0	1–1 (2–3 p)	2021 Africa Cup of Nations qualification
4.	23 November 2019	El Hadj Hassan Gouled Aptidon Stadium, Djibouti City, Djibouti	Mauritius	3–0	3–0	Friendly
5.	11 December 2019	Lugogo Stadium, Kampala, Uganda	Burundi	1–0	2–1	2019 CECAFA Cup
6.	11 December 2019	Lugogo Stadium, Kampala, Uganda	Burundi	2–1	2–1	2019 CECAFA Cup
7.	2 September 2022	Al Merreikh Stadium, Khartoum, Sudan	Sudan	1–3	2–3	2022 African Nations Championship qualification
