= Mohammed Mbye =

Gambian footballer (born 1989)

Personal information
- Full name: Mohammed Jallow Mbye
- Date of birth: 18 June 1989 (age 37)
- Place of birth: Banjul, Gambia
- Height: 1.88 m (6 ft 2 in)
- Position: Defender

Team information
- Current team: IFK Hässleholm

Youth career
- 2001–2006: Hammarby Talang
- 2007–2008: Rennes

Senior career*
Years	Team	Apps	(Gls)
2006	Hammarby IF	6	(0)
2007–2008	Rennes B	5	(0)
2009–2013	Assyriska FF	89	(2)
2013–2014	Elverum	40	(8)
2015–2017	Kristianstad FC	46	(0)
2017–2019	Mjällby AIF	63	(2)
2020	Ifö Bromölla IF	7	(0)
2021	Sölvesborgs GoIF	63	(2)
2022–	IFK Hässleholm	63	(2)

International career^{‡}
2008–2009	Gambia U-20	3	(1)
2010–	Gambia	15	(0)
- * Club domestic league appearances and goals as of 1 January 2023 ‡ National team caps and goals as of 19 December 2023

Mohammed Mbye (born 18 June 1989) is a Gambian footballer who last played as a defender for IFK Hässleholm.

== Early life ==
Mbye was born in The Gambia and moved to Sweden with his family at the age of eleven in 2001.

== Club career ==
Mbye began his career with Hammarby IF, when he moved to Sweden in 2001 to join the children's section of Hammarby Talang FF, the farm team of Hammarby IF. He moved in July 2007 to French club Rennes, where he played five games in the reserves and scored one goal. In 2008, Mbye joined Assyriska Föreningen, signing a three-year contract which running until 31 December 2012.

Following his stint in Mjällby AIF he played one season each for Ifö Bromölla IF, Sölvesborgs GoIF and IFK Hässleholm.

== International career ==
Mbye represented The Gambia at under-20 level before playing for the country's senior national team.

== Honours ==
Rennes

- Coupe Gambardella: 2008
