= Djibouti national football team =

Men's association football team

Djibouti
- Nickname(s): أسماك قرش البحر الأحمر; Requins de la Mer Rouge (Sharks of the Red Sea)
- Association: Fédération Djiboutienne de Football (FDF)
- Confederation: CAF (Africa)
- Sub-confederation: CECAFA (East & Central Africa)
- Head coach: Mohamed Meraneh Hassan (interim)
- Captain: Mahdi Houssein Mahabeh
- Most caps: Ali Youssouf Farada (39)
- Top scorer: Samuel Akinbinu (11)
- Home stadium: El Hadj Hassan Gouled Aptidon Stadium
- FIFA code: DJI
First colours	Second colours

FIFA ranking
- Current: 195 (18 November 2026)
- Highest: 169 (December 1994)
- Lowest: 203 (April–July 2015, November 2015)

First international
- French Somaliland 0–5 Ethiopia (French Somaliland; 5 December 1947); Post-independence; Ethiopia 8–1 Djibouti (Addis Ababa, Ethiopia; 27 March 1983)

Biggest win
- Djibouti 4–1 South Yemen (Djibouti City, Djibouti; 26 February 1988); Djibouti 3–0 Mauritius (Djibouti City, Djibouti; 23 November 2019)

Biggest defeat
- Uganda 10–1 Djibouti (Kigali, Rwanda; 9 December 2001); Rwanda 9–0 Djibouti (Dar es Salaam, Tanzania; 13 December 2007)

CECAFA Cup
- Appearances: 12 (first in 1994)
- Best result: Group stage (1994, 1999, 2000, 2001, 2005, 2006, 2007, 2008, 2009, 2011, 2015, 2019)

The Djibouti national football team (Arabic: منتخب جيبوتي لكرة القدم, French: Équipe de football de Djibouti), nicknamed the "Sharks of the Red Sea" (Arabic: أسماك قرش البحر الأحمر, French: Requins de la Mer Rouge), is the national football team of Djibouti. It is controlled by the Djiboutian Football Federation and is a member of the Confederation of African Football (CAF) and the Union of Arab Football Associations (UAFA). The Djibouti national football team's first win in a full FIFA-sanctioned international match was a 1–0 win vs. Somalia in the first round of the 2010 FIFA World Cup qualification.

Djibouti have never qualified for the FIFA World Cup or the Africa Cup of Nations.

== History ==
=== French Somaliland (1947–1960) ===
Djibouti played its first international match under the name French Somaliland, at home against neighbouring Ethiopia on 5 December 1947 and lost 5–0. This was also Ethiopia's debut. The two played again in Djibouti on 1 June 1948 and Ethiopia won 2–1. On 1 May 1949, the fixture was played for the Emperor Cup in Ethiopia, and the host won 6–0. In 1954, Djibouti played Ethiopia three times: a 10–2 away loss on 1 May, a 2–0 home loss on 1 June and a 2–1 home loss the day after. Djibouti did not play a match again until 1960, when it entered a tournament for French-speaking countries held in Madagascar. The team lost 9–2 in the first round to Cameroon on 13 April. This was the squad's last game as French Somaliland.

=== Djibouti (1977–present) ===
After gaining independence in 1977, the team played under the name Djibouti for the first time against Ethiopia in an away match on 27 March 1983 and lost 8–1. The two played again two days later with Ethiopia again victorious, by 4–2. After a third friendly against Ethiopia, a 2–0 home defeat on 23 March 1984, Djibouti entered a tournament in Ethiopia against the host and Zimbabwe. They lost 2–0 to Ethiopia on 3 June and then 3–1 to Zimbabwe on 7 June.

Djibouti's first appearance at the CECAFA Cup, a local competition for nations in East and Central Africa, was in Kenya in 1994. These were its first matches since defeating South Yemen in 1988. The Djibouti squad lost 4–1 to the hosts on 28 November, 2–1 to Somalia on 1 December, and 3–0 to Tanzania on 3 December. Djibouti did not advance to the next round.

After the 1994 CECAFA Cup, Djibouti did not play a match until the qualification campaign for the 1998 African Cup of Nations in Burkina Faso. They were drawn in a two-legged qualifier against Kenya, and lost the first leg 3–0 away on 31 July 1998. The second leg at home was lost 9–1 on 15 August and Kenya went through 12–1 on aggregate.

In 1998, Djibouti became a member of the Union of Arab Football Associations (UAFA). The football squad has since participated in the Arab Games, a regional multi-sport event held between nations from the Arab World.

Djibouti entered its first ever World Cup qualification in an attempt to reach the 2002 FIFA World Cup in South Korea and Japan. In Pool D of the first round of African qualification, it was drawn against the DR Congo in a two-legged qualifying preliminary. Djibouti hosted the first leg at Stade du Ville in Djibouti on 7 April 2000, drawing the match 1–1 before a crowd of 2,700 fans. The squad lost the second leg 9–1 away at the Stade des Martyrs in Kinshasa and the DR Congo advanced 10–2 on aggregate.

Djibouti has never played in the African Cup of Nations, with the team regularly withdrawing or not entering for financial reasons.

Prior to their four preliminary qualifiers in late 2019, Djibouti had 2 wins, 3 draws and 55 defeats from 60 competitive matches. However, a number of new players were called up and results finally improved. First, in the 2022 FIFA World Cup qualification, Djibouti beat Eswatini 2–1 at home and drew 0–0 in Manzini to advance to the second round for the first time since the 2010 qualifying when they beat Somalia 1-0 (2–1 on aggregate). This was a massive improvement from the previous edition when Djibouti had also played Eswatini and lost 8–1 on aggregate. One month later, Djibouti played two 1–1 draws against Gambia in the 2021 Africa Cup of Nations qualification preliminary round, only losing the tie on penalties.

== Results and fixtures ==
The following is a list of match results in the last 12 months, as well as any future matches that have been scheduled.

Win Draw Loss Fixture

=== 2025 ===
26 November 2025 FIFA Arab Cup qualification	Bahrain	1–0	Djibouti	Al-Rayyan, Qatar
16:00 UTC+3	Al-Romaihi 36'	Report		Stadium: Jassim bin Hamad Stadium; Referee: Juan Gabriel Benítez (Paraguay)

=== 2026 ===
26 March 2027 AFCON qualification	Djibouti	0–4	South Sudan	Juba, South Sudan
15:00 UTC+2		Report	Kuol 31'; Justin 49'; Maker 66'; Mangar 81'	Stadium: Juba Stadium; Attendance: 0 (Behind closed doors); Referee: Tewodros Mitiku (Ethiopia)

29 March 2027 AFCON qualification	South Sudan	0–1	Djibouti	Juba, South Sudan
15:00 UTC+2		Report	Akinbinu 77'	Stadium: Juba Stadium; Attendance: 0 (Behind closed doors); Referee: Retṧelisitsoe Molise (Lesotho)

== Coaches ==
Name	Nat	Period	Matches	Wins	Draws	Losses	Win %
Mohamed Bader	(Djibouti)	c. 1998 – Dec 2001	15	0	2	13	0.00%
Ahmed Hussein	(Djibouti)	Oct 2007 – Dec 2007	4	1	0	3	25.00%
Mohamed Abar	(Djibouti)	Jan 2008 – Jun 2008	4	0	0	4	0.00%
Ahmed Abdelmonem	(Egypt)	Jul 2008 – Jul 2010	11	0	1	10	0.00%
Noureddine Gharsalli	(Tunisia)	Oct 2011 – Jul 2016	5	0	0	5	0.00%
Michael Gibson	(England)	Jul 2016 – Apr 2017	4	1	0	3	25.00%
Moussa Ghassoum	(Mauritania)	Dec 2017 – Apr 2019	5	0	0	5	0.00%
Julien Mette	(France)	Apr 2019 – Oct 2021	13	3	3	7	23.08%
Mohamed Meraneh Hassan	(Djibouti)	Oct 2021 – Jan 2022	6	1	0	5	16.67%
Abdourahman Okie Hadi	(Djibouti)	Jan 2022 – present	4	2	2	0	50.00%

== Players ==
=== Current squad ===
The following players were selected for the 2026 FIFA World Cup qualification – CAF Group A matches against Burkina Faso and Ethiopia on 21 and 24 March 2025.

Caps and goals are correct as of 24 March 2025, after the match against Ethiopia.

No.	Pos.	Player	Date of birth (age)	Caps	Goals	Club
22	GK	Sulait Luyima	4 November 1993 (age 33)	10	0	(Djiboutian Football Federation) Arta Solar 7
12	GK	Moktar Youssouf Said	12 October 2004 (age 22)	1	0	(Djiboutian Football Federation) Dikhil
1	GK	Omar Mahamoud	19 October 2001 (age 25)	0	0	(Djiboutian Football Federation) Arta Solar 7
18	DF	Ali Youssouf Farada	25 August 1995 (age 31)	38	1	(Djiboutian Football Federation) AS Port
14	DF	Yabe Siad	12 March 1998 (age 28)	29	1	(Djiboutian Football Federation) Arta Solar 7
4	DF	Moussa Hamadou Araita	24 July 1997 (age 29)	20	0	(Djiboutian Football Federation) AS Port
6	DF	Moustapha Abdi Osman	8 January 1992 (age 34)	12	0	(Djiboutian Football Federation) Garde Républicaine
23	DF	Ibrahim Idriss Mohamed	14 November 2002 (age 24)	9	0	(Djiboutian Football Federation) ASAS Djibouti Télécom
20	DF	Yonis Kireh	10 May 2002 (age 24)	2	0	(French Football Federation) Gazélec
15	DF	Ahmed Zakaria	12 November 1998 (age 28)	2	0	(Djiboutian Football Federation) Gendarmerie Nationale
2	DF	Aboubaker Liban Abdi	28 November 2000 (age 25)	0	0	Unknown
13	MF	Doualeh Mahamoud Elabeh	11 November 1991 (age 35)	34	1	(Djiboutian Football Federation) Arta Solar 7
5	MF	Hamza Abdi Idleh	16 December 1991 (age 34)	30	2	(Djiboutian Football Federation) Dikhil
10	MF	Warsama Hassan	17 March 1999 (age 27)	28	2	(Football Federation of Macedonia) AP Brera
7	MF	Maarouf Abass Abaneh	8 November 2000 (age 26)	0	0	Unknown
16	MF	Sadik Aden	28 November 1999 (age 26)	0	0	Unknown
8	MF	Ahemdini Ali Gohar		0	0	Unknown
11	FW	Mahdi Houssein Mahabeh	20 December 1995 (age 30)	32	7	(Djiboutian Football Federation) Arta Solar 7
17	FW	Samuel Akinbinu	6 June 1999 (age 27)	23	10	(Djiboutian Football Federation) Arta Solar 7
3	FW	Gabriel Dadzie	6 March 1997 (age 29)	17	6	(Libyan Football Federation) Al Bashayer
21	FW	Ahmed Youssouf Omar	1 September 1998 (age 28)	16	0	(Djiboutian Football Federation) AS Port
9	FW	Moussa Amoud Wais	20 February 2001 (age 25)	1	0	Unknown
19	FW	Mouad Amir Mahamed	28 November 2005 (age 20)	0	0	Unknown

=== Recent call-ups ===
The following footballers were part of a national selection in the past 12 months, but are not part of the current squad.

Pos.	Player	Date of birth (age)	Caps	Goals	Club	Latest call-up

== Player records ==
As of 26 November 2025
Players in bold are still active with Djibouti.

=== Most appearances ===
Rank	Name	Caps	Goals	Career
1	**Ali Youssouf Farada**	41	1	2017–present
2	**Doualeh Mahamoud Elabeh**	35	1	2016–present
3	Daoud Wais	34	1	2008–2021
4	Daher Mohamed Kadar	33	1	2006–2017
5	**Mahdi Houssein Mahabeh**	32	7	2016–present
5	**Yabe Siad**	32	1	2019–present
7	**Warsama Hassan**	31	2	2019–present
8	**Hamza Abdi Idleh**	30	2	2016–present
9	Innocent Mbonihankuye	25	0	2019–2023
10	**Samuel Akinbinu**	23	11	2021–present
10	Guedi Hassan	23	0	2007–2016
10	**Ibrahim Aden Warsama**	23	1	2015–present

=== Top goalscorers ===
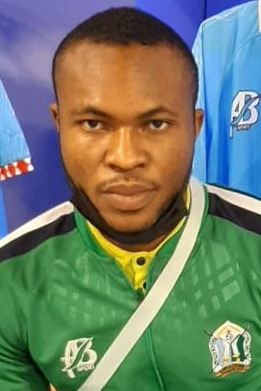
Samuel Akinbinu is Djibouti's top scorer with 11 goals.

Rank	Name	Goals	Caps	Ratio	Career
1	**Samuel Akinbinu**	11	23	0.43	2021–present
2	**Mahdi Houssein Mahabeh**	7	32	0.22	2016–present
3	**Gabriel Dadzie**	6	18	0.33	2022–present
4	Abdourahman Okieh Hadi	3	4	0.75	2005–2006
4	Ahmed Daher	3	13	0.23	2007–2009
6	Ahmed Daoud	2	3	0.67	2011
6	Arid Ahmed Mohamed	2	5	0.4	1999–2000
6	Mohamed Liban	2	17	0.12	2008–2015
6	**Hamza Abdi Idleh**	2	30	0.07	2016–present
6	**Warsama Hassan**	2	31	0.06	2019–present

== Djibouti records and statistics ==
- Djibouti player sent off: (4 times)
  - Youssouf Batio, v Algeria, 2 September 2021 (23rd minute)
  - Aptidon Saad, v Burkina Faso, 11 October 2021 (67th minute)
  - Yabe Siad Isman, v Burkina Faso, 5 September 2025 (10th minute)
  - Ahmed Zakaria, v Bahrain, 26 November 2025 (44th minute)
- Opponent player sent off: (3 times)
  - v Malawi, 25 November 2015 (35th minute)
  - v Niger, 6 September 2021 (83rd minute)
  - Houboulang Mendes, v Guinea-Bissau, 20 November 2023 (82nd minute)
- Largest comeback to wins the match: 1: (2 times)
  - v Burundi, 29 July 2022
  - v Mauritius, 14 June 2023
- Largest blown lead to lose the match: 1: (2 times)
  - v Yemen, 20 December 2006
  - v Rwanda, 2 December 2011
- Largest comeback to draw the match: 1: v Sudan, 4 January 2009
- Largest blown lead to draw the match: 1: (2 times)
  - v Gambia, 9 October 2019
  - v Gambia, 13 October 2019
- Longest winning streak: 2: from 14 June 2023 to 17 June 2023
- Longest unbeaten streak: 6: from 4 September 2019 to 11 December 2019
- Longest losing streak: 18: from 11 November 2011 to 13 March 2017
- Longest winless streak: 18: from 11 November 2011 to 13 March 2017
- Longest goalless streak: 933 minutes: from 17 October 2015 to 22 March 2017
- Most consecutive minutes without conceding a goal: 213 minutes: from 4 September 2019 to 9 October 2019
- Longest goalless streak by both teams: 178 minutes: from 13 October 2019 to 11 December 2019
- Most appearances: 41: Ali Youssouf Farada, from 11 March 2017 to present
- Most consecutive appearances: 25: Innocent Mbonihankuye, from 4 September 2019 to 17 June 2023
- Top goalscorer: 11: Samuel Akinbinu, from 15 June 2021 to present
- Biggest win: 3: (2 times)
  - v South Yemen, 26 February 1988
  - v Mauritius, 14 June 2023
- Biggest defeat: 9: (2 times)
  - v Uganda, 9 December 2001
  - v Rwanda, 13 December 2007
- Most goals by a player in a match: 2: Ahmed Hassan Daoud, v Rwanda, 2 December 2011
- Most goals by a player in first half: 2: Ahmed Hassan Daoud, v Rwanda, 2 December 2011
- Most goals by a player in second half: 1: (37 times): Last time: Samuel Akinbinu, v Ethiopia, 24 March 2025
- Most goals by a opponent player in a match: 4:
  - Getaneh Kebede, v Ethiopia, 15 July 2017
  - Islam Slimani, v Algeria, 2 September 2021
  - Mohamed Salah, v Egypt, 16 November 2023
- Most goals by a team in a match: 4: v South Yemen, 26 February 1988
- Most goals by a team in first half: 2: v Rwanda, 2 December 2011
- Most goals by a team in second half: 3: v Mauritius, 14 June 2023
- Most goals conceded in a match: 10: (2 times)
  - v Ethiopia, 1 May 1954
  - v Uganda, 9 December 2001
- Most goals conceded in first half: 5: (2 times)
  - v Kenya, 27 November 1994
  - v Uganda, 9 December 2007
- Most goals conceded in second half: 7: v Uganda, 9 December 2001
- Most goals by both teams in a match: 12: v Ethiopia, 1 May 1954
- Most goals by both teams in first half: 6: v Kenya, 27 November 1994
- Most goals by both teams in second half: 7: v Uganda, 9 December 2001
- Fewest goals by both teams in a match: 0: (4 times)
  - v Somalia, 19 November 2000
  - v Eswatini, 10 September 2019
  - v Somalia, 7 December 2019
  - v Liberia, 26 March 2024
- Fastest goals: 7th minutes: Abdul Rahman Okishi, v Yemen, 20 December 2006
- Fastest goals conceded: 1st minutes: Jason Mayélé, v Congo DR, 23 April 2000
- Fastest 2 goals to start the match: 32nd minutes: v Rwanda, 2 December 2011
- Fastest 2 goals conceded to start the match: 6th minutes: v Kenya, 27 November 1994

== Competition records ==
=== FIFA World Cup ===
FIFA World Cup record									Qualification record					
Appearances: 0									Appearances: 6					
Year	Round	Position	Pld	W	D	L	GF	GA	Pld	W	D	L	GF	GA
1930 to 1974	Part of France								Part of France					
1978 to 1994	Not a FIFA member								Not a FIFA member					
(France) 1998	Did not enter								Declined participation					
(South Korea) (Japan) 2002	Did not qualify								2	0	1	1	2	10
(Germany) 2006	Did not enter								Declined participation					
(South Africa) 2010	Did not qualify								7	1	0	6	3	30
(Brazil) 2014	Did not qualify								2	0	0	2	0	8
(Russia) 2018	Did not qualify								2	0	0	2	1	8
(Qatar) 2022	Did not qualify								8	1	1	6	6	30
(Canada) (Mexico) (United States) 2026	Did not qualify								10	0	1	9	5	33
(Morocco) (Portugal) (Spain) 2030	To be determined								To be determined					
(Saudi Arabia) 2034	To be determined								To be determined					
Total		0/7							31	2	3	26	17	119

=== Olympic Games ===
Olympic Games record
Appearances: 0
Year	Round	Position	Pld	W	D	L	GF	GA
1896 – 1976	Part of France							
(Soviet Union) 1980	Did not enter							
(United States) 1984	Did not enter							
(South Korea) 1988	Did not enter							
(Spain) 1992	Did not enter							
(United States) 1996	Did not enter							
(Australia) 2000	Did not enter							
(Greece) 2004	Did not enter							
(China) 2008	Did not qualify							
(United Kingdom) 2012	Did not enter							
(Brazil) 2016	Did not enter							
(Japan) 2020	Did not enter							
(France) 2024	Did not enter							
Total		0/28						

- Football at the Summer Olympics has been an under-23 tournament since the 1992 edition.

=== Africa Cup of Nations ===
Africa Cup of Nations record
Appearances: 0
Year	Round	Position	Pld	W	D	L	GF	GA
(Sudan) 1957 to (Ethiopia) 1976	Part of France							
(Ghana) 1978 to (Senegal) 1992	Not affiliated to CAF							
(Tunisia) 1994	Did not enter							
(South Africa) 1996	Did not enter							
(Burkina Faso) 1998	Did not enter							
(Ghana) (Nigeria) 2000	Did not qualify							
(Mali) 2002	Did not qualify							
(Tunisia) 2004	Withdrew							
(Egypt) 2006	Did not enter							
(Ghana) 2008	Withdrew							
(Angola) 2010	Did not qualify							
(Equatorial Guinea) (Gabon) 2012	Did not enter							
(South Africa) 2013	Did not enter							
(Equatorial Guinea) 2015	Did not enter							
(Gabon) 2017	Did not qualify							
(Egypt) 2019	Did not qualify							
(Cameroon) 2021	Did not qualify							
(Ivory Coast) 2023	Did not qualify							
(Morocco) 2025	Did not qualify							
(Kenya) (Tanzania) (Uganda) 2027	Did not qualify							
Total		0/35						

=== African Games ===
African Games record
Appearances: 0
Year	Round	Position	Pld	W	D	L	GF	GA
(Republic of the Congo) 1965	Part of France							
(Nigeria) 1973	Part of France							
(Algeria) 1978	Did not enter							
(Kenya) 1987	Withdrew during qualification							
(Egypt) 1991	Did not enter							
(Zimbabwe) 1995	Did not enter							
(South Africa) 1999	Did not enter							
(Nigeria) 2003	Did not enter							
(Algeria) 2007	Did not enter							
(Mozambique) 2011	Did not enter							
(Republic of the Congo) 2015	Did not enter							
(Morocco) 2019	Did not enter							
Total		0/12						

- Prior to the Cairo 1991 campaign, the Football at the All-Africa Games was open to full senior national teams.

=== African Nations Championship ===
African Nations Championship record
Appearances: 0
Year	Round	Position	Pld	W	D	L	GF	GA
(Ivory Coast) 2009	Did not enter							
(Sudan) 2011	Did not qualify							
(South Africa) 2014	Did not enter							
(Rwanda) 2016	Did not qualify							
(Morocco) 2018	Withdrew during qualifying							
(Cameroon) 2020	Banned							
(Algeria) 2022	Did not qualify							
(Kenya) (Tanzania) (Uganda) 2024	Did not qualify							
Total		0/7						

=== CECAFA Cup ===
CECAFA Cup record
Appearances: 10
Year	Round	Position	Pld	W	D	L	GF	GA
(Uganda) 1973	Part of France							
(Tanzania) 1974	Part of France							
(Zambia) 1975	Part of France							
1976	Part of France							
(Somalia) 1977	Did not enter							
(Malawi) 1978	Did not enter							
(Kenya) 1979	Did not enter							
(Sudan) 1980	Did not enter							
(Tanzania) 1981	Did not enter							
(Uganda) 1982	Did not enter							
(Kenya) 1983	Did not enter							
(Uganda) 1984	Did not enter							
(Zimbabwe) 1985	Did not enter							
(Ethiopia) 1987	Did not enter							
(Malawi) 1988	Did not enter							
(Kenya) 1989	Did not enter							
1990	Did not enter							
(Uganda) 1991	Did not enter							
(Tanzania) 1992	Did not enter							
(Kenya) 1994	Group Stage	8th	3	0	0	3	2	9
(Uganda) 1995	Did not enter							
(Sudan) 1996	Did not enter							
(Rwanda) 1999	Group Stage	11th	2	0	0	2	2	6
(Uganda) 2000	Group Stage	8th	4	0	1	3	4	15
(Rwanda) 2001	Group Stage	11th	3	0	0	3	3	17
(Tanzania) 2002	Did not enter							
(Sudan) 2003	Did not enter							
(Ethiopia) 2004	Did not enter							
(Rwanda) 2005	Group Stage	10th	4	0	0	4	2	18
(Ethiopia) 2006	Group Stage	11th	3	0	0	3	0	10
(Tanzania) 2007	Group Stage	8th	3	0	0	3	2	19
(Uganda) 2008	Group Stage	10th	4	0	1	3	2	13
(Kenya) 2009	Group Stage	12th	3	0	0	3	0	13
(Tanzania) 2010	Did not enter							
(Tanzania) 2011	Group Stage	11th	3	0	0	3	2	10
(Uganda) 2012	did not enter							
(Kenya) 2013	did not enter							
(Rwanda) 2015	Group Stage	11th	3	0	0	3	0	9
(Kenya) 2017	Did not enter							
(Uganda) 2019	Group Stage	6th	4	1	1	2	3	8
Total	0 Titles	12/39	35	1	3	35	22	147

=== FIFA Arab Cup ===
FIFA Arab Cup record									Arab Cup qualification record					
Year	Round	Position	Pld	W	D	L	GF	GA	Pld	W	D	L	GF	GA
(Lebanon) 1963	Part of France								Part of France					
(Kuwait) 1964	Part of France								Part of France					
(Iraq) 1966	Part of France								Part of France					
(Saudi Arabia) 1985	Did not enter								Did not enter					
(Jordan) 1988	Did not enter								Did not enter					
(Syria) 1992	Did not enter								Did not enter					
(Qatar) 1998	Did not enter								Did not enter					
(Kuwait) 2002	Did not enter								Did not enter					
2009	Did not qualify ^{1}								2	0	0	2	3	8
(Saudi Arabia) 2012	Did not enter								Did not enter					
(Qatar) 2021	Did not qualify								1	0	0	1	0	1
(Qatar) 2025	Did not qualify								1	0	0	1	0	1
Total		0/9							4	0	0	4	3	10

^1 The 2009 edition was cancelled during qualification.

=== Arab Games ===
Arab Games record
Appearances: 0
Year	Round	Position	Pld	W	D	L	GF	GA
(Egypt) 1953	Part of France							
(Lebanon) 1957	Part of France							
(Morocco) 1961	Part of France							
(United Arab Republic) 1965	Part of France							
(Syria) 1976	Part of France							
(Morocco) 1985	Did not enter							
(Syria) 1992	Did not enter							
(Lebanon) 1997	Did not enter							
(Jordan) 1999	Did not enter							
(Algeria) 2004	No tournament							
(Egypt) 2007	Did not enter							
(Qatar) 2011	Did not enter							
Total		0/11						

== See also ==
- French Somaliland national football team
- Djibouti national football team results
- Football in Djibouti
- Djiboutian Football Federation
- Djibouti Premier League
- Djibouti Cup
- Stade du Ville
