= List of lists of lists =

List of indices to lists on a topic

This is a list of articles that are lists of other list articles. Each of the pages linked here is an index to multiple lists on a topic.

== General reference ==
- List of lists of lists – this article itself is a list of lists, so it contains itself.
- Lists of academic journals
- Lists of common misconceptions
- Lists of encyclopedias
- Lists of publications in science
- Lists of problems

== Culture and the arts ==
=== Culture ===
- Lists of books
  - Lists of The New York Times number-one books
  - Publishers Weekly lists of bestselling novels in the United States
- Lists of dystopian works
- Lists of food and beverage topics
  - Lists of drinks
  - Lists of foods
    - Lists of prepared foods
  - Lists of restaurants
    - Lists of Michelin-starred restaurants
- Lists of Glagolitic manuscripts
- Lists of highest-grossing films
- Lists of magazines
- Lists of multimedia franchises
- Lists of newspapers
- Lists of online videos
- Lists of poems
- Lists of radio programs
- Lists of radio stations
- Lists of record labels
- Lists of Tamil-language media
- Lists of websites
- Lists of works of fiction made into feature films
- Lists of writers
  - Lists of American writers
  - Lists of Canadian writers

=== Art and the arts ===
==== Characters ====
- Lists of advertising characters
- Lists of fictional astronauts
- Lists of fictional characters by work
  - Lists of DC Comics characters
  - Lists of Marvel Comics characters
  - Lists of Star Wars characters
- Lists of fictional presidents of the United States
- Lists of fictional species
  - Lists of dragons
  - Lists of fictional animals
  - Lists of fictional hybrids
  - Lists of fictional extraterrestrial species and races
  - Lists of humanoids
  - Lists of legendary creatures
  - Lists of vampires
- Lists of horror film characters
- Lists of LGBTQ figures in fiction and myth
- Lists of mascots
- Lists of superheroes
- Lists of villains

==== Performing arts ====
- Lists of actors
  - Lists of actors by country
  - Lists of actors by television series
  - Lists of Marvel Cinematic Universe cast members
  - Lists of Star Wars cast members
  - Lists of Wizarding World cast members
- Lists of albums
  - Lists of Billboard 200 number-one albums
  - Lists of Billboard number-one country albums
  - Lists of Irish Albums Chart number ones
  - Lists of number-one albums
  - Lists of UK top-ten albums
- Lists of Billboard Hot 100 top-ten singles
- Lists of Billboard number-one rhythm and blues hits
- Lists of Billboard number-one singles
- Lists of black metal bands
- Lists of comedians
- Lists of comedies
- Lists of classical music
- Lists of compositions
- Lists of Eurovision Song Contest entries
- Lists of Hot 100 number-one singles of 2009
- Lists of music by theme
- Lists of music genres
- Lists of music inspired by literature
- Lists of music venues
- Lists of musical instruments by Hornbostel–Sachs number
- Lists of musicals
- Lists of musicians
  - Lists of a cappella groups
  - Lists of blues musicians
  - Lists of Christian bands and artists by genre
  - Lists of composers
  - Lists of country music artists
  - Lists of dance musicians
  - Lists of hip-hop artists
  - Lists of jazz artists
  - Lists of pop artists
  - Lists of rock artists
- Lists of one-hit wonders
- Lists of operas
- Lists of plays adapted into feature films
- Lists of rock performers
- Lists of singers
- Lists of songs
  - Lists of Geordie song-related topics
  - Lists of number-one songs
  - Lists of songs in Glee (TV series)
  - Lists of theme songs
- List of Star Trek lists
- Lists of Stargate topics
- Lists of UK Chart number ones
- Lists of UK top-ten singles

==== Visual arts ====
- Lists of animation
- Lists of anime
- Lists of anime episodes
- Lists of artists
  - Lists of painters
  - Lists of Chinese artists
  - Lists of women artists
  - Lists of Archibald Prize finalists
- Lists of colors
- Lists of comics
  - Lists of DC Comics publications
  - Lists of manga
    - Lists of One Piece chapters
  - Lists of Marvel Comics publications
  - Lists of webcomics
- Lists of films
  - Lists of animated films
  - Lists of box office number-one films
  - Lists of cult films
  - Lists of feature film series
  - Lists of feature films with LGBTQ characters
  - Lists of films based on actual events
  - Lists of films based on books
  - Lists of films based on mythology
  - Lists of films by location
    - Lists of African films
    - Lists of American films
    - Lists of Asian films
    - Lists of Canadian films
    - Lists of Caribbean films
    - Lists of European films
    - Lists of Indian films
    - Lists of Latin American films
    - Lists of Oceanian films
  - Lists of films by genre
  - Lists of films by studio
  - Lists of films considered the worst
  - Lists of films released by Disney
  - Lists of films set around holidays
  - Lists of highest-grossing films
  - Lists of historical films
  - Lists of silent films
- Lists of Netflix exclusive international distribution programming
- Lists of Picasso artworks
- Lists of public art
  - Lists of monuments and memorials
    - Lists of scheduled monuments in Scotland
    - Lists of scheduled monuments in Wales

=== Entertainment ===
==== Games ====
- Lists of free games
- Lists of games considered the best
- Lists of Japanese games
- Lists of Jimmy Fallon games and sketches
- Lists of Nintendo characters
- Lists of Nintendo products
- Lists of video games
  - Lists of Activision video games
  - Lists of arcade video games
  - Lists of Atari games
  - Lists of best-selling video games by platform
  - Lists of cancelled video games
  - Lists of Game Boy games
  - Lists of games on Nintendo consoles
  - Lists of PlayStation Store games
  - Lists of PlayStation Vita games
  - Lists of Sega games
  - Lists of sports video games
  - Lists of video game companies
  - Lists of video game consoles
  - Lists of video game soundtracks

==== Sports ====
- Lists of American football topics
  - Lists of American football players
  - Lists of College Football Hall of Fame inductees
  - Lists of high school football rivalries
  - Lists of NFL team seasons
- Lists of association football topics
  - Lists of association football clubs
  - Lists of college soccer programs
  - Lists of England international footballers
  - Lists of European football transfers
  - Lists of Japanese football transfers
  - Lists of men's association football players
  - Lists of national association football teams by nickname
  - Lists of national football team results
  - Lists of women's association football players
- Lists of Australian rules football leagues
- Lists of baseball topics
  - Lists of baseball parks
  - Lists of Major League Baseball umpires
  - List of Minor League Baseball lists
  - Lists of Negro league baseball teams
  - Lists of no-hitters
- Lists of bids for the Olympic Games
- Lists of cricket records
- Lists of curling clubs
- Lists of Formula One records
- Lists of Gaelic games clubs
- Lists of hat-tricks
- Lists of Olympic water polo records and statistics
- Lists of Philippine Basketball Association imports
- Lists of sports venues
- Lists of sportspeople
- Lists of stadiums
- Lists of teams on the World Curling Tour
- Lists of tennis records and statistics
- Sri Lanka cricket lists

==== Television ====
- Lists of C-SPAN Q&A interviews
- Lists of Conan O'Brien sketches
- Lists of home video releases
- Lists of game shows
- Lists of reality television show franchises
- Lists of television channels
  - Lists of television channels in India
  - Lists of Spanish-language television channels
- Lists of television episodes
  - Lists of American children's animated television episodes
  - Lists of American children's television episodes
  - Lists of American comedy television episodes
  - Lists of American crime television episodes
  - Lists of American drama television episodes
  - Lists of American non-fiction television episodes
  - Lists of American sitcom episodes
  - Lists of American television episodes
  - Lists of anime episodes
  - Lists of Australian television episodes
  - Lists of British television episodes
  - Lists of Canadian television episodes
  - Lists of Christmas television episodes
  - Lists of Philippine television episodes
  - Lists of radio series episodes
  - Lists of reality television episodes
- Lists of television networks by country
- Lists of television programs
  - Lists of animated television series
  - Lists of Canadian network television schedules
  - Lists of Canadian television series
  - Lists of dramatic television series with LGBT characters
  - Lists of television programs by episode count
  - Lists of television programs with LGBTQ characters
  - Lists of TVB dramas and series
  - Lists of United States network television schedules
- Lists of television specials
- Lists of television stations in North America

== Geography and places ==
=== Manmade features ===
==== Countries and regions ====
- Lists of borders
- Lists of counties
  - Lists of counties in the United States
- Lists by country
- Lists of country-related topics
- Lists of flags
  - Lists of country subdivision flags
  - Lists of German municipal flags
  - Lists of Japanese municipal flags
- Lists of national institutions
- Lists of national symbols
- Lists of non-sovereign nations
- Lists of political and geographic subdivisions by total area
- Lists of political entities by century
- Lists of regions of Scotland
- Lists of sovereign states and dependent territories
  - Lists of African Union members
  - Lists of countries and territories by official language
  - Lists of countries by GDP
  - Lists of countries by mineral production
  - Lists of countries with people on postage stamps
  - Lists of country codes
  - Lists of country subdivisions
  - Lists of member states of the European Union
- Lists of the Arab League
- Lists of time zones
- Lists of townlands of County Cork
- Lists of U.S. state topics
- List of Colorado-related lists
- Lists of Oregon-related topics

==== Places ====
- Lists of amusement parks
- Lists of communities in Ontario
- Lists of Cultural Properties of the Philippines
- Lists of heritage sites
  - Lists of Bienes de Interés Cultural
  - Lists of Intangible Cultural Heritage elements
  - Lists of protected heritage sites in Belgium
  - Lists of Roman sites
  - Lists of World Heritage Sites
- Lists of fictional locations
- Lists of historic places in Canada
- Lists of landmarks
  - Lists of locally designated landmarks in the United States
  - Lists of New York City landmarks
- Lists of national parks
- Lists of National Treasures of Japan
- Lists of parks in New Zealand
- Lists of places
  - Lists of places by eponym
  - Lists of places in Antarctica
  - Lists of places in Kansas
  - Lists of places in Wales
- Lists of renamed places
- Lists of state parks by U.S. state
- Lists of tourist attractions
  - Lists of tourist attractions in England
  - Lists of tourist attractions in Switzerland
- Lists of unincorporated communities
- Lists of Women's March locations

==== Settlements ====
- Lists of capital cities
- Lists of cities
  - Lists of cities and towns
  - Lists of cities by country
  - Lists of cities in Africa
  - Lists of cities in Asia
  - Lists of cities in Central America
  - Lists of cities in Europe
  - Lists of cities in Palestine
  - Lists of cities in Serbia and Montenegro
  - Lists of cities in the United States
  - Lists of communes of France
  - Lists of Copenhagen topics
  - Lists of populated places in the United States
    - Lists of Los Angeles topics
    - Lists of New York City topics
    - Lists of Omaha topics
    - Lists of San Francisco topics
    - Lists of San Francisco Bay Area topics
    - Lists of United States cities with large ethnic minority populations
    - Lists of U.S. cities with non-white majority populations
  - Lists of populated places in Turkey
  - Lists of the largest cities in Canada
- Lists of municipalities
  - Lists of municipalities of Belgium
  - Lists of municipalities in Canada
  - Lists of municipalities in Turkey
- Lists of neighborhoods by city
- Lists of rural localities in Russia
- Lists of settlements in Yorkshire by population
- Lists of towns
  - Lists of ghost towns in Canada
  - Lists of ghost towns in the United States
- Lists of twin towns and sister cities
- Lists of villages

=== Natural features ===
- Lists of bodies of water
- Lists of extreme points
- Lists of highest points
- Lists of hills
- Lists of islands
- Lists of lagoons
- Lists of lakes
  - Lists of lakes of the United States
- Lists of landforms in Australia
- Lists of landforms of the United States
- Lists of mountains
  - List of mountain lists
  - Lists of mountains and hills in the British Isles
  - Lists of mountains by region
  - Lists of mountains in Ireland
  - Lists of mountain passes
- Lists of rivers
- Lists of rocks in Western Australia
- Lists of volcanoes
- Lists of waterways

== History and events ==
=== Events ===
- Lists of air show accidents and incidents
- Lists of school-related attacks
- Lists of archives
- Lists of assassinations
- Lists of Canadian tornadoes and tornado outbreaks
- Lists of conferences
- Lists of Democratic Republic of the Congo attacks
- Lists of disasters
  - Lists of rail accidents
  - Lists of traffic collisions
- Lists of Dutch inventions and discoveries
- Lists of earthquakes
  - Lists of 20th-century earthquakes
  - Lists of 21st-century earthquakes
- Lists of fatal shark attacks
- Lists of festivals
- Lists of floods in the United States
- Lists of George Floyd protests
- Lists of incidents at Disney parks
- Lists of incidents of civil unrest in the United States
- Lists of killings by law enforcement officers
  - Lists of killings by law enforcement officers in the United States
- Lists of mass shootings in the United States
- Lists of massacres
- Lists of most murders
- Lists of murders
- Lists of nuclear disasters and radioactive incidents
- Lists of pro-Palestinian protests
- Lists of resignations
- Lists of tenants in the World Trade Center (1973–2001)
- Lists of timelines
- Lists of tornadoes in the United States
- Lists of United States presidential trips
- Lists of years by topic

=== War ===
- Lists of allied military operations of the Vietnam War
- Lists of American Civil War units by state
- Lists of battles
  - Lists of battles fought in U.S. states
  - Lists of battles of the French Revolutionary Wars and Napoleonic Wars
  - Lists of battles of the Mongol invasion of Europe
- Lists of commandants of cadets of the United States
- Lists of flying aces in Arab–Israeli wars
- Lists of military commanders
- Lists of military decorations
- Lists of Victoria Cross recipients
- Lists of Medal of Honor recipients
- Lists of wars
  - Lists of wars involving the United Kingdom
  - Lists of wars involving the United States
- Lists of World War I topics
  - Lists of World War I flying aces
- Lists of World War II topics
  - Lists of World War II flying aces
  - Lists of World War II prisoner-of-war camps
  - Lists of World War II military equipment

== Natural and physical sciences ==
=== Biology ===
- Lists of animals
  - Lists of amphibians by region
  - Lists of birds by region
  - Lists of breeds
  - Lists of cats
  - Lists of dogs
  - Lists of elephants
  - Lists of endemic birds
  - Lists of fauna of Europe
  - Lists of horse-related topics
  - Lists of individual animals
  - Lists of insects of Great Britain
  - Lists of Lepidoptera by region
  - Lists of mammals by population
  - Lists of mammals by region
  - Lists of moths
  - Lists of organisms by population
  - Lists of pigs
  - Lists of poultry breeds
  - Lists of prehistoric animals
  - Lists of prehistoric fish
  - Lists of reptiles
  - Lists of snakes
  - Lists of sponges
- Lists of aquarium life
- Lists of biologists
- Lists of dinosaur-bearing stratigraphic units
- Lists of dinosaur specimens
- Lists of diseases
- Lists of ecoregions
- Lists of environmental publications
- Lists of environmental topics
- Lists of forests
- Lists of fossiliferous stratigraphic units
- Lists of human genes
- Lists of Mesozoic bird-line archosaur genera
- Lists of plants
  - Lists of cultivars
  - Lists of flowering plants of South Africa
  - Lists of plant diseases
  - Lists of trees
- Lists of sequenced genomes
- Lists of species
  - Lists of extinct species
  - Lists of invasive species
  - Lists of IUCN Red List species
- Lists of synapsids
- Lists of virus taxa

=== Physical sciences ===
- Lists of astronomical objects
  - Lists of geological features of the Solar System
  - Lists of minor planets
  - Lists of planets
  - Lists of stars
- Lists of Atlantic hurricanes
- Lists of compounds
- Lists of constellations
- Lists of data references for chemical elements
- Lists of fatty acids
- Lists of molecules
- Lists of lunar eclipses
- Lists of physics equations
- Lists of research stations
- Lists of scientific skepticism topics
- Lists of solar eclipses
- Lists of tornadoes and tornado outbreaks
- Outline of tropical cyclones

== People ==
- Lists of activists
- Lists of ancient tribes in the Balkans
- Lists of births by year
- Lists of celebrities
- Lists of centenarians
- Lists of Claremont Colleges people
- Lists of cross-dressers
- Lists of deaths
  - Lists of deaths by year
  - Lists of death tolls
  - Lists of deaths in popular music
  - Lists of law enforcement officers killed
  - Lists of people by cause of death
    - Lists of martyrs
    - Lists of people executed in the United States
      - Lists of people executed in Texas
  - Lists of unusual deaths
  - Lists of victims of the September 11 attacks
- Lists of contemporary ethnic groups
  - Lists of black people
- Lists of fellows of the IEEE
- Lists of fellows of the American Physical Society
- Lists of fellows of the Royal Society by election year
- Lists of Indigenous people
  - Lists of First Nations
  - Lists of Inuit
- Lists of LGBTQ people
  - Lists of bisexual people
  - Lists of gay, lesbian or bisexual people
  - Lists of LGBTQ politicians
- Lists of men
- Lists of women
  - Lists of women in music
- Lists of murderers
  - Lists of serial killers
- Lists of people by epithet
- Lists of people by net worth
- Lists of people of the Three Kingdoms
- Lists of people who disappeared
  - Lists of solved missing person cases
- Lists of people with inflammatory bowel disease

=== Nationality ===
- Lists of people by nationality
  - Lists of Albanians
  - Lists of Americans
    - Lists of African Americans
    - Lists of American Jews
    - Lists of former United States citizens
    - Lists of Italian Americans
    - Lists of people from Kansas
  - Lists of Armenians
  - Lists of Australians
  - Lists of British people
    - Lists of fellows of the British Academy
    - Lists of people from London
  - Lists of Canadians
    - Lists of Canadians by city
    - Lists of people from Quebec
  - Lists of Indian people
    - Lists of Indian film families
  - Lists of Lebanese diaspora
  - Lists of Marathi people
  - Lists of people from African Union states
  - Lists of Swedes
  - Lists of Macedonians
  - Lists of Nepalese people
  - Lists of New Zealanders
  - Lists of Sri Lankan people

=== Occupations ===
- Lists of occupations
- Lists of people by occupation
  - Lists of actors
    - Lists of child actors
  - Lists of actresses
  - Lists of artists
  - Lists of astronauts
  - Lists of emperors
  - Lists of engineers
  - Lists of journalists
  - Lists of mathematicians
  - Lists of models
    - Lists of Harper's Bazaar cover models
    - Lists of Playboy models
    - Lists of Vogue cover models
  - Lists of monarchs
    - Lists of ancient monarchs
    - Lists of Irish kings
    - Lists of monarchs in the British Isles
    - Lists of monarchs in Spain
    - Lists of monarchs of Georgia
    - Lists of monarchs of Romania
  - Lists of musicians
  - Lists of noble families
    - Lists of baronetcies
    - Lists of baronies
    - Lists of dukedoms
    - Lists of dukes
    - Lists of marquessates
    - Lists of princesses
    - Lists of viscountcies
  - Lists of painters
  - Lists of philosophers
  - Lists of women photographers
  - Lists of rulers
    - Lists of rulers of Egypt
    - Lists of rulers of Ethiopia
    - Lists of rulers of Ghana
    - Lists of rulers of Kenya
    - Lists of rulers in the Low Countries
  - Lists of scientists
    - Lists of Earth scientists
    - Lists of Muslim scientists and scholars
    - Lists of space scientists

=== Office-holders ===
- Lists of office-holders
  - Lists of ambassadors
    - Lists of ambassadors of Canada
    - Lists of ambassadors of China
    - Lists of ambassadors of Europe
    - Lists of ambassadors of India
    - Lists of ambassadors of Iran
    - Lists of ambassadors of Israel
    - Lists of ambassadors of Japan
    - Lists of ambassadors of Myanmar
    - Lists of ambassadors of the Philippines
    - Lists of ambassadors of Russia
    - Lists of ambassadors of South Korea
    - Lists of ambassadors of Sweden
    - Lists of ambassadors of the United Kingdom
    - Lists of ambassadors to the United States
  - Lists of custodes rotulorum
  - Lists of governors
  - Lists of high commissioners of India
  - Lists of mayors by country
  - Lists of office-holders of the United States
  - Lists of Polish politicians
  - Lists of political office-holders
    - Lists of political office-holders in Brandenburg
    - Lists of political office-holders in Estonia
    - Lists of political office-holders in France
    - Lists of political office-holders in Germany
    - Lists of political office-holders in Greece
    - Lists of political office-holders in India
    - Lists of political office-holders in Ireland
    - Lists of political office-holders in Italy
    - Lists of political office-holders in Serbia
    - Lists of political office-holders in Transylvania
    - Lists of female political office-holders in the United Kingdom
  - Lists of presidents
  - Lists of state leaders
  - Lists of United States public officials who owned slaves

=== Sportspeople ===
- Lists of sportspeople
- Lists of Albanian athletes
- Lists of Asian Games medalists
- Lists of cricketers
  - Lists of English cricketers
  - Lists of Indian cricketers
  - Lists of One Day International cricketers
  - Lists of Pakistani cricketers
  - Lists of Scottish cricketers
  - Lists of Test cricketers
  - Lists of Twenty20 International cricketers
- Lists of current NFL team rosters
- Lists of current NHL team rosters
- Lists of footballers
  - Lists of American football players
  - Lists of College Football Hall of Fame inductees
  - Lists of England international footballers
  - Lists of European football transfers
  - Lists of Japanese football transfers
  - Lists of men's association football players
  - Lists of women's association football players
- Lists of golfers
- Lists of gymnasts
- Lists of kickboxers
- Lists of Olympic medalists
- Lists of one-club men
- Lists of Paralympic medalists
- Lists of players
  - Lists of Canadian international soccer players
  - Lists of Chicago Bears players
  - Lists of Cuban League baseball players
  - Lists of Detroit Lions players
  - Lists of Green Bay Packers players
  - Lists of Major League Baseball players
  - Lists of NBA players
  - Lists of Negro league baseball players
  - Lists of NHL players
  - Lists of Philippine Basketball Association players
  - Lists of Pro Bowl players
  - Lists of rugby union players
  - Lists of tennis players
  - Lists of volleyball players
- Lists of professional bodybuilders
- Lists of professional wrestling personnel
- Lists of rodeo performers
- Lists of sailors at the Summer Olympics
- Lists of SEA Games medalists
- Lists of sports champions
- Lists of sumo wrestlers
- Lists of wrestlers

== Religion and belief systems ==
- Lists of angels
- Lists of Bible pericopes
- Lists of deities
  - Lists of deities by cultural sphere
- Lists of demons
- Lists of Greek mythological figures
- Lists of holidays
  - Lists of holidays by country
- Lists of people by belief
  - Lists of atheists
  - Lists of Christians
    - Lists of Catholics
    - Lists of catholicoi
    - Lists of former Christians
  - Lists of Hindus
  - Lists of Jews
    - Lists of American Jews
    - Lists of Jews associated with literature and journalism
    - Lists of Jews associated with the visual arts
    - Lists of Jews in politics
  - Lists of Muslims
    - Lists of Islamic scholars
- Lists of martyrs
- Lists of New Testament minuscules
- Lists of papal encyclicals
- Lists of religious leaders
  - Lists of chief rabbis
  - Lists of maraji
  - Lists of popes, patriarchs, primates, archbishops, and bishops
    - Lists of creations of cardinals
    - Lists of patriarchs
    - Lists of popes
- Lists of religious structures
  - Lists of church buildings
    - Lists of Armenian churches
    - Lists of cathedrals
    - Lists of Catholic church buildings
    - Lists of churches in the Archdiocese of Los Angeles
    - Lists of churches in England
    - Lists of Coptic church buildings
  - Lists of Hindu temples
  - Lists of monasteries
  - Lists of monastic houses in the United Kingdom
  - Lists of mosques
    - Lists of mosques in North America
    - Lists of mosques in South America
- Lists of saints
  - Lists of Eastern Orthodox saints

== Society and social sciences ==
=== Honors and awards ===
- Lists of awards
  - Lists of acting awards
  - Lists of art awards
  - Lists of awards and nominations received by American actors
  - Lists of civil awards and decorations of the United States
  - Lists of military decorations
  - Lists of humanities awards
  - Lists of Latin American Academy Award winners and nominees by country
  - Lists of Padma Bhushan award recipients
  - Lists of Padma Shri award recipients
  - Lists of Sahitya Akademi Award winners
  - Lists of science and technology awards
- Lists of individuals nominated for the Nobel Peace Prize
- Lists of people by honor
  - Lists of covers of Time magazine
  - Lists of fellows of the British Academy
  - Lists of Heroes of the Soviet Union
  - Lists of Légion d'honneur recipients
  - Lists of Nobel laureates
  - Lists of Olympic medalists
  - Lists of Paralympic medalists
  - Lists of people on the United States cover of Rolling Stone
  - Special Honours Lists (Australia)
  - Lists of Victoria Cross recipients
- Lists of The New York Times number-one books
- Publishers Weekly lists of bestselling novels in the United States

=== Linguistics ===
- Lists of abbreviations
- Lists of acronyms
- Lists of dictionaries
- Lists of Egyptian hieroglyphs
- Lists of English translations from medieval sources
- Lists of English words
  - Lists of English words by country or language of origin
  - Lists of Merriam-Webster's Words of the Year
- Lists of etymologies
  - Lists of North American place name etymologies
- Lists of ISO 639 codes
- Lists of languages
- Lists of Latin phrases
- Lists of long and short words
- Lists of medical eponyms
- Lists of names
  - Lists of East Asian surnames
  - Lists of Jewish surnames
  - Lists of Korean names
  - Lists of most common surnames
  - Lists of nicknames
- Lists of pejorative terms for people
- Lists of slogans

=== Social organizations ===
==== Infrastructure ====
- Lists of bridges
  - Lists of covered bridges in North America
- Lists of bus routes in New York City
- Lists of cemeteries
- Lists of crossings
  - Lists of crossings of the East River
  - Lists of crossings of the Hudson River
  - Lists of crossings of the Mississippi River
- Lists of former state routes
- Lists of mines
- Lists of named passenger trains
- Lists of NJ Transit bus routes
- Lists of pipelines
- Lists of post offices in the United States
- Lists of rail accidents
- Lists of railway stations
- Lists of urban rail transit systems
- Lists of roads and highways
  - Lists of highways by number
  - Lists of highways in Michigan
  - Lists of Interstate Highways
  - Lists of roads in Toronto
  - Lists of roads in the United Kingdom
- Lists of tunnels

==== Economy and business ====
- Lists of banks
- Lists of brands
- Lists of companies
  - Lists of companies by stock exchange listing
  - Lists of companies of the United States by state
  - Lists of publishing companies
  - Lists of video game companies
- Lists of corporate mergers and acquisitions
- Lists of corporate assets
- Lists of corporate headquarters by city
- Lists of free trade agreements
- Lists of exchange-traded funds
- Lists of law firms
- Lists of most expensive items by category
- Lists of pharmaceutical industry topics
- Lists of recessions

==== Education ====
- Lists of academic chancellors and vice chancellors
- Lists of school shootings in the United States
- Lists of schools
  - Lists of boys' schools
  - Lists of Catholic schools
  - Lists of girls' schools
  - Lists of law schools
  - Lists of medical schools
  - Lists of schools by country
    - Lists of schools in Australia
    - Lists of schools in Belgium
    - Lists of schools in Canada
    - Lists of schools in England
    - Lists of schools in Hong Kong
    - Lists of schools in Japan
    - Lists of schools in Malaysia
    - Lists of schools in Mauritius
    - Lists of schools in New Zealand
    - Lists of schools in Pakistan
    - Lists of schools in South Africa
    - Lists of schools in Sri Lanka
    - Lists of schools in the United Kingdom
    - Lists of schools in the United States
  - Lists of universities and colleges
    - Lists of universities and colleges by country
      - Lists of American colleges and universities
      - Lists of institutions of higher education in India
    - Lists of institutions of higher education by endowment size
    - Lists of NCAA institutions
- Lists of school districts in the United States
- Lists of school-related attacks
- Lists of university leaders
- Lists of schools in Beijing
- Lists of schools in Shenzhen

==== Government and politics ====
- Lists of active separatist movements
- Lists of American state and local politicians convicted of crimes
- Lists of Brazil state symbols
- Lists of Bundestag members
- Lists of Canadian federal elections
- Lists of deputies of the National Assembly of France
- Lists of diplomatic missions
- Lists of electoral districts by country and territory
- Lists of German politicians
- Lists of governments of Lithuania
- Lists of government ministries by country
- Lists of incidents of political violence in the United States
- Lists of Indian state symbols
- Lists of Italian politicians
- Lists of Knesset members
- Lists of libertarian topics
- Lists of lord lieutenancies
- Lists of members
  - Lists of members of parliament in Singapore
  - Lists of members of the Canadian House of Commons
  - Lists of members of the European Parliament for the United Kingdom
  - Lists of members of the House of Lords
  - Lists of members of the Lok Sabha by year
  - Lists of members of the National Assembly (South Korea)
  - Lists of members of the Parliament of Canada who died in office
  - Lists of members of the Politburo of the Communist Party of the Soviet Union
  - Lists of members of the Senate of Canada
- Lists of new members of the United States Congress
- Lists of newspaper endorsements in United States presidential elections
- Lists of political memoirs
- Lists of political parties
- Lists of princely states of India
- Lists of Privy Counsellors
- Lists of proclamations by Donald Trump
- Lists of state leaders
- Lists of the United States Congress
- Lists of Trump rallies
- Lists of United Kingdom by-elections
- Lists of United Kingdom MPs
- Lists of United States state symbols
- Political lists

==== Law ====
- Lists of acts
  - Lists of acts of the New Zealand Parliament
  - Lists of acts of Australia
  - Lists of acts of the Scottish Parliament
- Lists of bills in the United States Congress
- Lists of first women lawyers and judges
- Lists of landmark court decisions
- Lists of law clerks of the Supreme Court of the United States
- Lists of lawsuits
- Lists of legal issues
- Lists of legal terms
- Lists of legislation
- Lists of statutes of the Australian Capital Territory
- Lists of supreme court justices
- List of United States crime-related lists
- Lists of United States Supreme Court cases
  - Lists of United States Supreme Court cases by volume
- Outline of law
  - Lists of case law

== Technology and applied sciences ==
=== Aerospace ===
- Lists of artificial objects sent into space
- Lists of rockets
- Lists of rocket launches
- Lists of space organizations
- Lists of space programs
- Lists of space scientists
- Lists of spacewalks and moonwalks
- Lists of telescopes
- Lists of Thor and Delta launches
- Outline of space exploration

=== Buildings ===
- Lists of buildings and structures
  - Lists of buildings and structures in Puerto Rico
  - Listed buildings in the United Kingdom
    - Listed buildings in England
    - Listed buildings in Northern Ireland
    - Listed buildings in Scotland
    - Listed buildings in Wales
    - Lists of listed buildings in Scotland
    - Lists of listed buildings in Shetland
    - Grade II* listed buildings in England
- Lists of castles
  - Lists of castles by country
  - Lists of castles in Europe
- Lists of cathedrals
- Lists of cultural property of national significance in Switzerland
- Lists of domes
- Lists of hillforts
- Lists of hospitals
  - Lists of hospitals in Africa
  - Lists of hospitals in Asia
  - Lists of hospitals in Europe
  - Lists of hospitals in North America
  - Lists of hospitals in Oceania
  - Lists of hospitals in South America
  - Lists of hospitals in the United States
- Lists of hotels
- Lists of libraries
- Lists of lighthouses
- Lists of marae in New Zealand
- Lists of mills
- Lists of museums
  - Lists of museums in England
- Lists of pyramids
- Lists of royal residences
- Lists of shopping malls
- Lists of tallest buildings in India
- Lists of tallest buildings in New York
- Lists of theatres
- Lists of United States state prisons
- Lists of works by Sharpe, Paley and Austin

=== Computing ===
- Lists of artificial intelligence topics
- Lists of cameras
- Lists of computers
- Lists of databases
- Lists of database management systems
- Lists of filename extensions
- Lists of graphics cards
- Lists of mobile computers
- Lists of mobile phones
- Lists of network protocols
- Lists of North American area codes
- Lists of programming blocks
- Lists of programming languages
- Lists of software
  - Lists of Apple software
  - Lists of bioinformatics software
  - Lists of engineering software
  - Lists of open-source artificial intelligence software
  - Lists of programming software development tools
- Lists of websites

=== Energy ===
- Lists of dams and reservoirs
- Lists of generating stations in Canada
- Lists of hydroelectric power stations
- Lists of nuclear reactors
- Lists of power stations
- Lists of power stations in the United States
- Lists of renewable energy topics
- Lists of wind farms
- Lists of windmills in the United Kingdom

=== Military ===
- Lists of accidents and incidents involving military aircraft
- Lists of armies
- Lists of armoured fighting vehicles
- Lists of artillery
- Lists of currently active military equipment by country
- Lists of gun cartridges
- Lists of Japanese weapons and military equipment
- Lists of military aircraft by nation
- Lists of military aircraft of the United States
- Lists of military corps
- Lists of military divisions
- Lists of military equipment
- Lists of military installations
- Lists of naval flags
- Lists of swords
- Lists of war monuments and memorials
- Lists of weapons

=== Transport ===
- Lists of airports
  - Lists of airports in Africa
  - Lists of airports in Asia
  - Lists of airports in Europe
  - Lists of airports in North America
  - Lists of airports in Oceania
  - Lists of airports in South America
  - Lists of the busiest airports
- Lists of automobile-related articles
- Lists of aviation topics
  - Lists of aircraft
  - Lists of airlines
  - Lists of defunct airlines
- Lists of bus rapid transit systems
- Lists of locomotive classes
- Lists of ports
- Lists of public transport routes
- Lists of sail frigates
- Lists of ships
  - Lists of ship commissionings and decommissionings
  - Lists of ship launches
  - Lists of ships of World War II
- Lists of shipwrecks
- Lists of U-boats
- Lists of watercraft types

== Miscellaneous ==
- List of cannabis-related lists
- Lists of drugs
- Lists of dynasties
- Lists of figures in Germanic heroic legend
- Lists of hoards
- Lists of mathematics topics
- Lists of knights bachelor
- Lists of pairs
- Lists about Pokémon
- Lists of statistics topics
- Lists of post-nominal letters
- Lists of replicas
- Lists of The Simpsons topics
- Lists of UN numbers
- Lists of United Nations Security Council resolutions
- Lists of United States commemorative coins

== See also ==
- Category:Lists
- Category:Lists of lists
- Outline of knowledge
- Wikipedia:Contents/Lists
