= Sri Lanka cricket lists =

This is a list of Sri Lanka Cricket lists, an article with a collection of lists relating to the Sri Lankan Cricket team.

== Cricketers ==
=== Men ===
- List of Sri Lanka Test cricketers
- List of Sri Lanka ODI cricketers
- List of Sri Lanka Twenty20 International cricketers

=== Women ===
- List of Sri Lanka women Test cricketers
- List of Sri Lanka women ODI cricketers

== Player statistics ==
=== Batting ===
- List of international cricket centuries by Aravinda de Silva
- List of international cricket centuries by Kumar Sangakkara
- List of international cricket centuries by Mahela Jayawardene
- List of international cricket centuries by Marvan Atapattu
- List of international cricket centuries by Sanath Jayasuriya
- List of international cricket centuries by Tillakaratne Dilshan

=== Bowling ===
- List of international cricket five-wicket hauls by Muttiah Muralitharan
- List of international cricket five-wicket hauls by Rangana Herath

== Records ==
=== Test ===
- List of Sri Lankan Test cricket records
- List of Sri Lanka cricketers who have taken five-wicket hauls on Test debut

=== One-day International ===
- List of Sri Lanka One Day International cricket records

=== Twenty20 ===
- List of Sri Lanka Twenty20 International cricket records

== See also ==
- 2009 attack on the Sri Lanka national cricket team
