= Obituary =

Short biography of someone who recently died

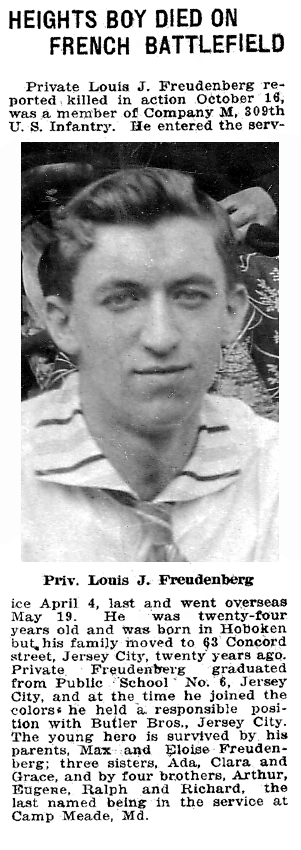
American obituary for WWI death

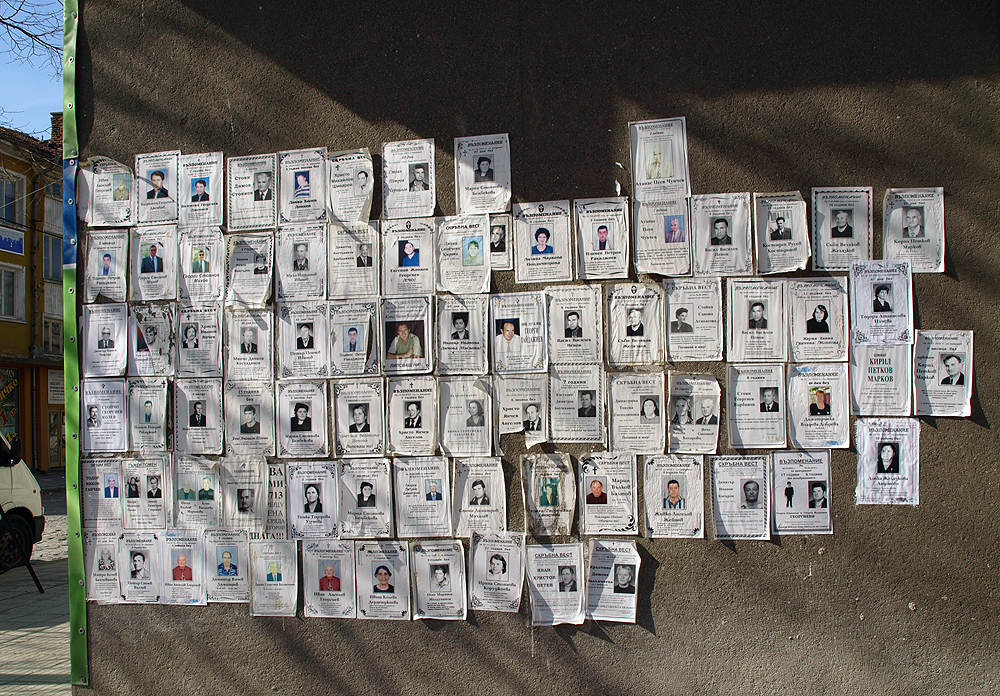
Traditional street obituary notes in Bulgaria

An obituary (obit for short) is a biographical article written about someone who has recently died. Newspapers often publish obituaries as news articles. Although obituaries tend to focus on positive aspects of the subject's life, this is not always the case. According to Nigel Farndale, the obituaries editor of The Times, obituaries ought to be "balanced accounts" written in a "deadpan" style, and should not read like a hagiography.

In local newspapers, an obituary may be published for any local resident upon death. A necrology is a register or list of records of the deaths of people related to a particular organization, group or field, which may only contain the sparsest details, or small obituaries. Historical necrologies can be important sources of information.

Two types of paid advertisements are related to obituaries. One, known as a death notice, usually appears in the Births, Marriages and Deaths (BMD) section of a paper and omits most biographical details and may be a legally required public notice under some circumstances. The other type, a paid memorial advertisement, is usually written by family members or friends, perhaps with assistance from a funeral home. Both types of paid advertisements are usually run as classified advertisements.

The word also applies to the entire program booklet for a funeral and the part of that program describing the life of the deceased. It is given to those who attend the service. The verso page heading may be Obituary or Reflections, the recto heading is usually Order of Service.

== Media ==
Obituaries are a notable feature of The Economist, which publishes one full-page obituary per week, reflecting on the subject's life and influence on world history. Past subjects have included Ray Charles, Uday Hussein and George Floyd.

The Times and the Daily Telegraph publish anthologies of obituaries under a common theme, such as military obituaries, sports obituaries, heroes and adventurers, entertainers, rogues, eccentric lives, etc.

The British Medical Journal encourages doctors to write their own obituaries for publication after their death.

For numerous summer seasons, CBC Radio One has run The Late Show, a radio documentary series which presents extended obituaries of interesting Canadians.

== Prewritten obituaries ==
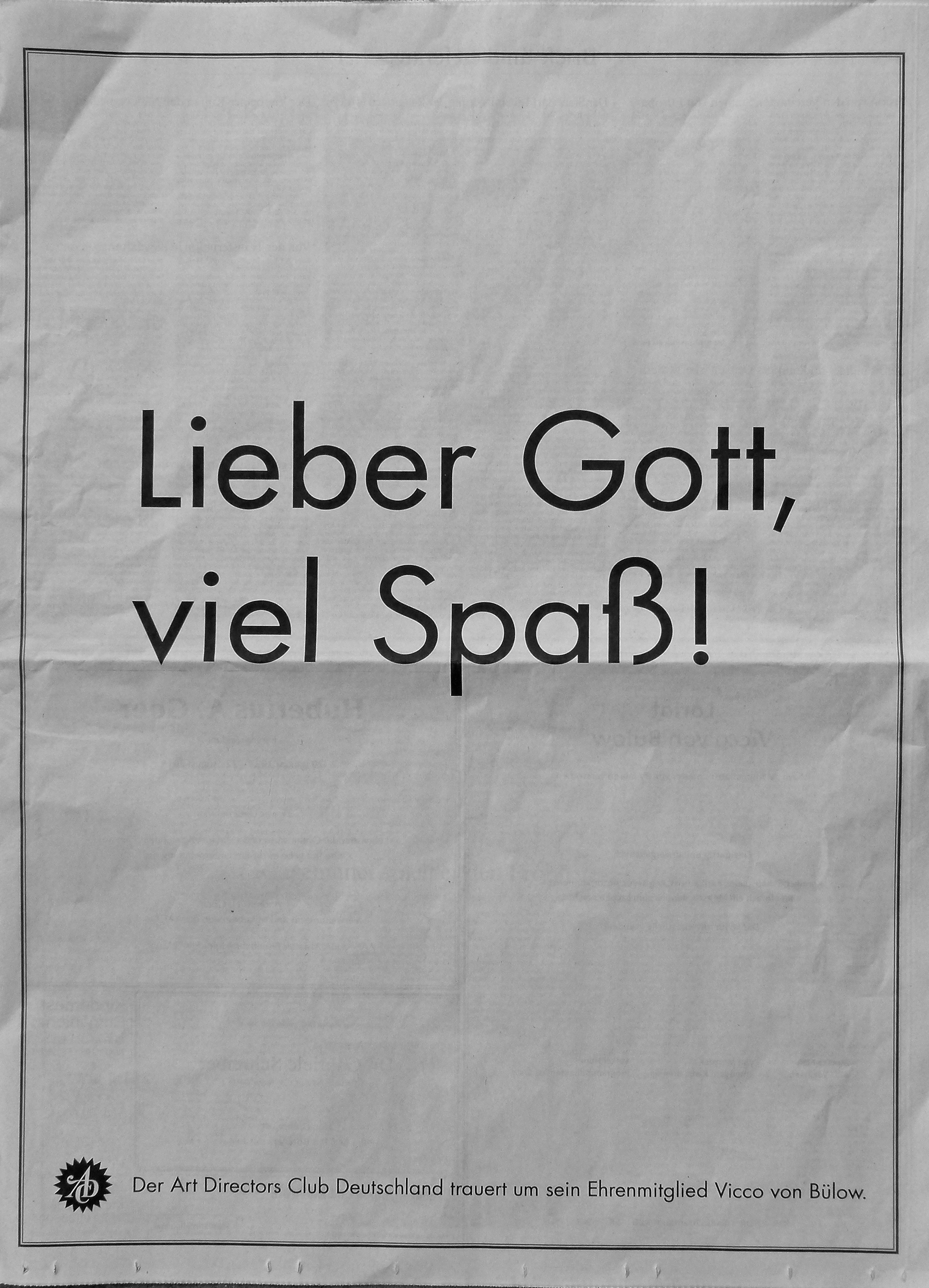
When the deceased person was very well known, the notice is sometimes written in an unconventional manner. The above was published after the death of Loriot, a highly popular German humorist, director and actor, by the German Art Directors Club. The text simply means "Dear God, have fun!".

Many news organizations maintain prewritten (or pre-edited video) obituaries on file for notable individuals who are still living, in order to promptly publish detailed, authoritative, and lengthy obituaries upon their deaths. These are also known as "advance" obituaries. The Los Angeles Times' obituary of Elizabeth Taylor, for example, was written in 1999 after three months of research, then often updated before the actress' 2011 death. Sometimes the prewritten obituary's subject outlives its author. One example is The New York Times' obituary of Taylor, written by the newspaper's theater critic Mel Gussow, who died in 2005. The 2023 obituary of Henry Kissinger featured reporting by Michael T. Kaufman, who died almost 14 years earlier in 2010. The 2025 NYT obituary of musician Tom Lehrer was written by Richard Severo, who left the paper in 2006 and died in 2023.

Writing in 2021, Paul Farhi of The Washington Post observed that while once a "sleepy corner of journalism", publications in the Internet age have invested more resources in preparing advance obituaries for rapid publication online, in order to meet widespread public interest; obituaries can attract millions of readers online within days of their subjects' deaths. The New York Times maintains a "deep reservoir" of advance obituaries, estimated to stand at roughly 1,850 as of 2021. The paper often interviews notables specifically for their obituaries, a practice begun by Alden Whitman in 1966. As of 2021, The Washington Post has about 900 advance obituaries on file, and entertainment publication The Hollywood Reporter has prepared 800 advances for notable figures in the film and television industry.

An advance obituary is usually not written until the subject has reached old age, as the earlier a profile is written, the more additions and revisions it will likely require. Former New York Times obituary writer Margalit Fox wrote that "as a general rule, when lives are long enough, accomplished enough and complex enough that we would just as soon not get caught short writing them on deadline, advances are assigned". Consequently, many public figures who die unexpectedly or prematurely will have no obituary available at a given publication, and journalists will be left to research and write lengthy articles on short notice. However, Farhi noted that advance obituaries of younger people will occasionally be prepared if they are known to have health problems or "chaotic lives"; The Washington Post had an advance obituary for singer Amy Winehouse, whose struggles with substance abuse were widely chronicled before her death at age 27. In another case, Nigel Farndale, an obituaries editor for The Times, said that in April 2020, when news broke that then-British Prime Minister Boris Johnson was in an intensive care unit with COVID-19 during the pandemic, he was under considerable pressure to quickly prepare an obituary that could be immediately published if Johnson died from the disease.

Still, for particularly major figures, advance obituaries may be drafted early in their lives and revised constantly throughout the following years or decades. Bill McDonald, obituaries editor of The New York Times, estimated in 2016 that Fidel Castro's obituary "cost us more man/woman hours over the years than any piece we've ever run". Work on it began in 1959, and it went through many subsequent iterations. Well into the 21st century, the visual layout for the obituary was substantially modified to match changes in the paper's page size, and a presentation for its digital edition cycled through different slideshow and video formats to match advances in Internet download speeds. The newspaper began drafting an obituary for Queen Elizabeth II when she was still heir apparent, and it was rewritten in its entirety multiple times until her death in 2022.

== Premature obituaries ==
A premature obituary is a false reporting of the death of a person who is still alive. It may occur due to unexpected survival of someone who was close to death. Other reasons for such publication might be miscommunication between newspapers, family members, and the funeral home, often resulting in embarrassment for everyone involved.

In November 2020, Radio France Internationale accidentally published about 100 prewritten obituaries for celebrities such as Queen Elizabeth II and Clint Eastwood. The premature publication was blamed on a transition to a new content management system.

Irish author Brendan Behan said, "there is no such thing as bad publicity except your own obituary." In this regard, some people seek to have an unsuspecting newspaper editor publish a premature death notice or obituary as a malicious hoax, perhaps to gain revenge on the "deceased". To that end, nearly all newspapers now have policies requiring that death notices come from a reliable source (such as a funeral home), though even this has not stopped some pranksters such as Alan Abel.

== See also ==
- Death
- Eulogy
- Funeral
- Gedenkschrift
- He never married
- Lists of deaths
