= Sam S. Walker =

United States Army general

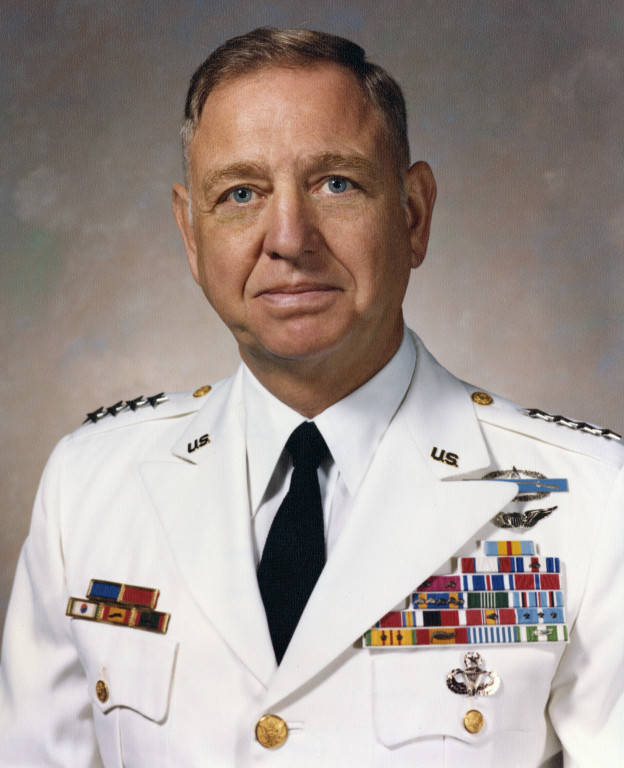
- Born: 31 July 1925; West Point, New York, US
- Died: 8 August 2015 (aged 90); Charlotte, North Carolina, US
- Burial place: West Point Cemetery
- Relatives: General Walton Walker (father)
- Military career
- Allegiance: United States
- Branch: United States Army
- Service years: 1946–1978
- Rank: General
- Commands: Allied Land Forces South East Europe; 3rd Infantry Division; 2d Brigade; 1st Battalion, 30th Infantry Regiment
- Conflicts: Korean War; Vietnam War
- Awards: Defense Distinguished Service Medal; Army Distinguished Service Medal; Silver Star (2); Legion of Merit (3); Distinguished Flying Cross; Bronze Star Medal; Air Medal (13)
- Other work: Superintendent, Virginia Military Institute

Sam Sims Walker (31 July 1925 – 8 August 2015) was a United States Army general who served as the Commanding General of Allied Land Forces, South East Europe from 1977 to 1978.

== Military career ==
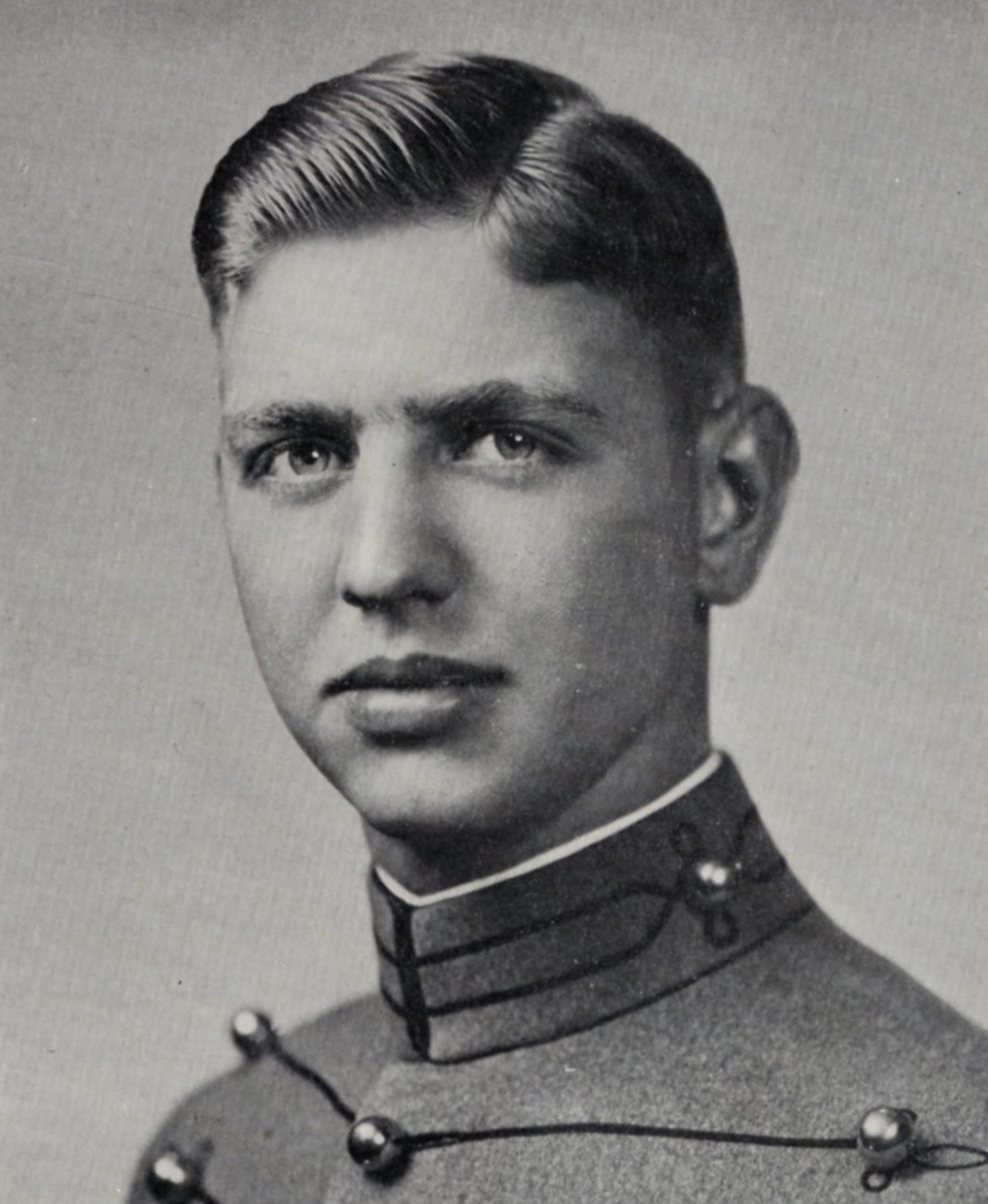
Walker as a United States Military Academy cadet c. 1946

Walker was born at West Point, New York, the son of General Walton Walker, himself a four-star general. He enrolled in the Virginia Military Institute in 1941, but transferred to the United States Military Academy the next year. Upon graduation from West Point with a B.S. degree on 4 June 1946, he was commissioned into the infantry, and his initial assignment was with the 11th Airborne Division on occupation duty in Japan. In the Korean War, he served as a company commander in the 24th Infantry Division, earning a Silver Star. Also during his time in Korea, his father, then commanding the Eighth United States Army, was killed in a vehicle accident. Returning to the United States at the end of his combat tour in 1951, he was assigned to the United States Army Infantry School as an instructor.

After graduating in 1957 from the Command and General Staff College, Walker served in a variety of assignments, including aide-de-camp to the Chief of Staff of the Army, tactical officer at West Point, and Secretary of the General Staff of the United Nations Command/United States Forces Korea. He was a distinguished graduate from the National War College in 1964, while also earning an M.S. degree in international relations from George Washington University. Walker then assumed command of the 1st Battalion, 30th Infantry Regiment. He volunteered for duty in South Vietnam, serving as G-3, 1st Infantry Division, and took command of the 2d Brigade as a lieutenant colonel, earning a second Silver Star. He led the brigade during Operation Attleboro. Walker was also awarded the Distinguished Flying Cross, the Bronze Star Medal and thirteen Air Medals.

After Vietnam, Walker attended the six-week Advanced Management Program at Harvard Business School, followed by an assignment in the Office of the Vice Chief of Staff of the United States Army as Chief of Force Readiness, Force Planning, and Analysis. After that position he was chosen to represent the army on the Council on Foreign Relations.

Walker received his first star in 1968, and became the assistant division commander, 82nd Airborne Division, before being selected as the 54th Commandant of Cadets at West Point in 1969. Promoted to major general, he took command of the 3rd Infantry Division, followed by selection as the United States commander in Berlin.

As a lieutenant general, Walker served as the deputy commanding general, United States Army Forces Command at Fort McPherson, Georgia from 1975 to 1977. In 1977 he was selected for promotion to general, at the time the youngest four-star general in the army, and appointed to his final position as commanding general, Allied Land Forces Southeast, headquartered in Turkey. His time in Turkey was a tumultuous one, coinciding with the United States arms embargo against Turkey for deploying troops to Cyprus in 1974. A Turkish general was assigned command of Allied Forces in Turkey as a way to maintain positive relations with Turkey; with no four-star positions available, the army offered Walker assignment as chief of staff for the United States European Command, a three-star position. Walker declined this post, and opted to retire. At the end of his assignment in Turkey, he was awarded the Defense Distinguished Service Medal and the Turkish Armed Forces Medal of Distinguished Service.

== Post-military career ==
After retiring from the army, Walker was the superintendent of the Virginia Military Institute in Lexington, Virginia, from 1981 to 1988. He also served as a board member of the Advisory Council of the United States-Korea Foundation, the Council on United States-Korea Security Studies, the National D-Day Museum, and the American Friends of Turkey. Walker was an initiate of the Beta Commission of Kappa Alpha Order.

Walker received the 2005 Distinguished Graduate Award from the Association of Graduates of the United States Military Academy.

Walker died on 8 August 2015, at the age of 90. He was buried at West Point Cemetery on 12 October 2015, Section XVIII, Row F, Site 65.

== Awards and decorations ==
Individual awards
Defense Distinguished Service Medal
Distinguished Service Medal
Silver Star with 1 oak leaf cluster
Legion of Merit with 2 oak leaf clusters
Distinguished Flying Cross
Bronze Star Medal
Air Medal, with 2 silver and 3 bronze oak leaf clusters
Army Commendation Medal
American Campaign Medal
World War II Victory Medal
Army of Occupation Medal with Japan clasp
National Defense Service Medal with 1 oak leaf cluster
Korean Service Medal with 3 campaign stars
Vietnam Service Medal with 2 service stars
Unit awards
Presidential Unit Citation
Meritorious Unit Commendation
Republic of Korea Presidential Unit Citation
Vietnamese Cross of Gallantry Unit Award
Civil Actions Medal Unit Citation
Foreign awards
Gallantry Cross of Vietnam w/ palm
Turkish Armed Forces Medal of Distinguished Service
United Nations Korea Medal
Vietnam Campaign Medal
Badges
Combat Infantryman Badge (two awards)
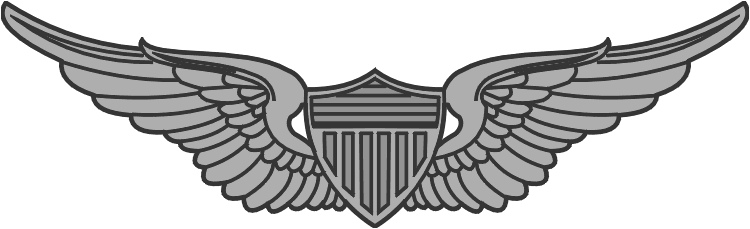
Army Aviator Badge
Master Parachutist Badge
Army Staff Identification Badge
