= Theme music =

Musical composition written specifically for some other work

Opening credits and theme music to the American Broadcasting Company/Universal Television cartoon series Calvin and the Colonel (1961–1962)

Theme music is a musical composition which is often written specifically for radio programming, television shows, video games, or films and is usually played during the title sequence, opening credits, closing credits, and in some instances at some point during the program. The purpose of a theme song is often similar to that of a leitmotif.

The phrase theme song or signature tune may also be used to refer to a signature song that has become especially associated with a particular performer or dignitary, often used as they make an entrance.

== Purpose ==
From the 1950s onwards, theme music, and especially theme songs also became a valuable source of additional revenue for Hollywood film studios, many of which launched their own recording arms. This period saw the beginning of more methodical cross-promotion of music and movies. One of the first big successes, which proved very influential, was the theme song for High Noon (1952).

== Types ==
=== Main title ===
The main title is the music, often later recorded on soundtrack albums, that is heard in a film while the opening credits are rolling. It does not refer to music playing from on-screen sources such as radios, as in the original opening credits sequence in Touch of Evil.

A main title can consist of a tune sung by the leading character over the credits, such as Moon River, sung by Audrey Hepburn in Breakfast at Tiffany's, or the main orchestral theme as written by the composer, such as the famous The Pink Panther Theme. It can also be a medley of themes from the film, as in the 1959 Ben-Hur. In the film A Hard Day's Night, the title tune was heard over the opening credits showing The Beatles running from their fans. An overture may serve as a main title, as in The Sound of Music. However, there is a very strong difference in a roadshow theatrical release between an overture and a main title. The overture in such films is heard on pre-recorded tape or film, before the film even begins, while the house lights are still up and there is yet no picture on the screen. The main title begins when the film actually starts. In the case of The Sound of Music though (and also Fiddler on the Roof), no overture was heard before the lights in the theatre went down; therefore, in these cases, the main title did serve as an overture. Both films had pre-credits opening sequences; during these, the first song from the film was sung, and immediately afterwards, the main title music followed.

In movie musicals, the main title nearly always consists of one or more of the songs from the film, played by the orchestra.

=== Television ===
Theme music has been a feature of the majority of television programs since the medium's inception. Programs have used theme music in a large variety of styles, sometimes adapted from existing tunes, and with some composed specifically for the purpose. A few have been released commercially and become popular hits.

Other themes, like the music for The Young and the Restless, Days of Our Lives, and Coronation Street have become iconic mostly due to the shows' respective longevities. Unlike others, these serials have not strayed from the original theme mix much, if at all, allowing them to be known by multiple generations of television viewers.

In the United Kingdom and Ireland, iconic sports shows have such strong associations with their theme music that the sports themselves are synonymous with the theme tunes, such as association football (The Match of the Day, Grandstand and The Big Match theme tunes), cricket ("Soul Limbo" by Booker T. & the M.G.'s), motorsport (Roger Barsotti's Motor Sport and the bassline from Fleetwood Mac's "The Chain"), tennis (Keith Mansfield's "Light and Tuneful"), snooker ("Drag Racer" by the Doug Wood Band), skiing (Sam Fonteyn's "Pop Looks Bach", the theme to Ski Sunday) and gaelic games ("Jägerlatein" by James Last). Themes in the United States that have become associated with a sport include Johnny Pearson's "Heavy Action" (used for many years as an intro to Monday Night Football), "Roundball Rock" (composed by John Tesh) as the theme for the NBA on NBC during the 1990s and early 2000s, and for Fox College Hoops (from 2018–19 to present) and Jr. NBA Championships (2019–present), "Bugler's Dream" (used in ABC and NBC's coverage of the Olympic Games) and the theme to ESPN's sports highlight show, SportsCenter. A notable theme that was once associated with a sport, but because of its popularity, spread network-wide was the NFL on Fox theme, which was used for Major League Baseball on Fox (2010–2019) and NASCAR on Fox (2011–2015) and Fox UFC (2012–2018) and Premier Boxing Champions (December 2018 to July/August 2019) and Jr. NBA Championships (unknown-2018) broadcasts, and was regarded as the network's single theme by October 2010. CBS' longtime March Madness theme is considered one of the masterpieces of Americans sports theme music, said to deliver a euphoric feeling to many sports fans. In Canada, the soaring backbeats of the Hockey Night in Canada theme, "The Hockey Theme", became so iconic that the piece was sometimes called Canada's second national anthem. It became something of a national scandal when broadcaster CBC Television lost the rights to use the theme in 2008.

Most television shows have specific, melodic theme music, even if just a few notes (such as the clip of music that fades in and out in the title sequence for Lost, or the pulsing sound of helicopter blades in the theme music for Airwolf). One exception is 60 Minutes, which features only the ticking hand of a TAG Heuer stopwatch. Another recent exception is Body of Proof which has no theme song, and barely even has a title sequence.

In most television series, the theme song is played during the opening sequence. One exception to this rule is Regular Show, the theme music of which is played only during its ending credits in most episodes. In lieu of its theme music, its opening sequence instead features a tone played on a synthesizer overlaid with a ticking sound effect.

=== Remixes ===
Notable is the theme for the game show The Price Is Right, reimagined as Crystal Waters' "Come On Down" which marked the first time that lyrics were added to The Price Is Right theme song and was the first song based on a television theme song (and the first to come from a game show) to reach number 1 on the Billboard Hot Dance Club Play chart on the week of December 29, 2001.

=== Radio ===
Radio programs with notable theme music include Just a Minute, which uses a high-speed rendition of the Minute Waltz by Frédéric Chopin; The Archers, which has Barwick Green; Desert Island Discs which has By the Sleepy Lagoon, and The Rush Limbaugh Show, which uses the instrumental from "My City Was Gone."

In talk radio, a different theme song is often used to introduce each segment, and the music (usually popular music of some sort) will often relate to the topic being discussed. John Batchelor is noted for his use of highly dramatic orchestral scores leading in and out of each segment of his weekly show.

=== Video games ===
Many video games feature a theme song that is distinctive to the series. A popular one to date is the "Prelude Theme" from the Final Fantasy series, which is played on most, if not all, of the title screens of the original games, most notably Final Fantasy I to Final Fantasy IV. The newer ones also feature the theme, albeit usually modernized, and played during the ending credits.

== See also ==
- Overture
- Bumper music
- Lists of theme songs
  - List of television theme music
- Show tune
- List of signature songs
- Television news music
- Trademark look
- Production music
- Leitmotif
