= Lists of catholicoi =

List of catholicoi (a title of heads of many Eastern churches - singular catholicos):

- List of catholicoi of all Armenians
- List of Armenian catholicoi of Cilicia
- List of Armenian Catholic patriarchs of Cilicia
- List of Chaldean Catholic patriarchs of Baghdad
- List of patriarchs of the Church of the East
- List of heads of the Georgian Orthodox Church
- List of Caucasian Albanian catholicoi

== See also ==
- Catholicos
- Catholicos of All Armenians
- Catholicos of The East and Malankara Metropolitan
- Catholicos-Patriarch of All Georgia
- Catholicos of India
- Lists of patriarchs
