= Lists of space organizations =

Types of space organizations

The Lists of space organizations include:

- List of government space agencies
- List of non-profit space agencies
- List of private spaceflight companies
- List of space forces, units, and formations
