= Lists of tallest buildings in New York =

Lists of tallest buildings in New York include:

- List of tallest buildings in New York City
  - List of tallest buildings in Brooklyn
  - List of tallest buildings in Queens
  - List of tallest buildings in Staten Island
- List of tallest buildings in Upstate New York
  - List of tallest buildings in Albany
  - List of tallest buildings in Buffalo
  - List of tallest buildings in Rochester, New York
  - List of tallest buildings in Syracuse, New York
- List of tallest buildings on Long Island

== See also ==
- List of tallest buildings in the United States
