= Lists of NCAA institutions =

The National Collegiate Athletic Association is composed of athletic teams of more than a thousand member colleges and universities. They are listed by division:

- List of NCAA Division I institutions
- List of NCAA Division II institutions
- List of NCAA Division III institutions
