= Lists of resignations =

The following articles contain lists of resignations:

- List of resignations from government
- List of papal renunciations
- List of on-air resignations
- List of resignations from the Guantanamo military commission
- List of resignations in Iceland
- List of investigations, resignations, suspensions, and dismissals in conjunction with the news media phone hacking scandal

Specific resignations:

- Abdication of Japanese Emperor Akihito
- Resignation of Pope Benedict XVI
- Resignation of Silvio Berlusconi
- Resignation of Tony Blair
- Resignation of David Cameron
- Resignation of Robert Fico
- Resignation of Chrystia Freeland
- Resignation of Sheikh Hasina
- Resignation of Sajid Javid
- Resignation of Jehangir Karamat
- Resignation of Raeesah Khan
- Resignation of Pedro Pablo Kuczynski
- Resignation of Theresa May
- Resignation of Manuel Merino
- Resignation of Hosni Mubarak
- Resignation of Robert Mugabe
- Resignation of Richard Nixon
- Resignation of Sarah Palin
- Resignation of Keir Starmer
- Resignation of Suharto
- Resignation of Justin Trudeau
- Resignation of Margaret Thatcher
- List of dismissals and resignations in the first Trump administration
  - Resignation of Michael T. Flynn

== See also ==
- Resignation
