= Lists of films based on mythology =

List of films influenced by or based on mythology

List of films based on mythology may refer to:

- List of films based on Greco-Roman mythology
- List of films based on Germanic mythology
- List of films based on Slavic mythology
- List of works based on Arthurian legends § Film
- List of films and television series featuring Robin Hood
