= Lists of settlements in Yorkshire by population =

Lists of settlements in Yorkshire by population include:

- List of settlements in East Riding of Yorkshire by population
- List of settlements in North Yorkshire by population
- List of settlements in South Yorkshire by population
- List of settlements in West Yorkshire by population
