= Lists of video game soundtracks =

This is a list of lists related to video game soundtracks.

== Lists ==
- List of video game soundtracks considered the best
- List of video game soundtracks released on CD
- List of video game soundtracks released on vinyl
