= Lists of populated places in Turkey =

The following are lists of populated places in Turkey by province:

- Adana
- Adıyaman
- Afyonkarahisar
- Ağrı
- Aksaray
- Amasya
- Ankara
- Antalya
- Ardahan
- Artvin
- Aydın
- Balıkesir
- Bartın
- Batman
- Bayburt
- Bilecik
- Bingöl
- Bitlis
- Bolu
- Burdur
- Bursa
- Çanakkale
- Çankırı
- Çorum
- Denizli
- Diyarbakır
- Düzce
- Edirne
- Elazığ
- Erzincan
- Erzurum
- Eskişehir
- Gaziantep
- Giresun
- Gümüşhane
- Hakkâri
- Hatay
- Iğdır
- Isparta
- Istanbul
- İzmir
- Kahramanmaraş
- Karabük
- Karaman
- Kars
- Kastamonu
- Kilis
- Kırıkkale
- Kırklareli
- Kırşehir
- Kocaeli
- Konya
- Malatya
- Manisa
- Mardin
- Mersin
- Muğla
- Muş
- Nevşehir
- Niğde
- Ordu
- Osmaniye
- Rize
- Sakarya
- Samsun
- Siirt
- Sinop
- Şırnak
- Sivas
- Tekirdağ
- Tokat
- Trabzon
- Tunceli
- Uşak
- Yalova
- Yozgat
- Zonguldak
