= Lists of former United States citizens =

Lists of former United States citizens cover citizens of the United States who were denaturalized, or stripped of their nationality, and citizens who chose to relinquish their nationality.

== Lists ==
- List of denaturalized former citizens of the United States
- List of former United States citizens who relinquished their nationality
- Quarterly Publication of Individuals Who Have Chosen to Expatriate, a U.S. government publication listing the names of certain former U.S. citizens

== See also ==
- National Instant Criminal Background Check System, a non-public FBI gun control database which includes people who have renounced U.S. citizenship
- Relinquishment of United States nationality
- Emigration from the United States
