= Lists of sports champions =

This is a list of lists of sports champions.

- List of Hungarian Athletics Championships champions (men)
- List of Hungarian Athletics Championships champions (women)
- List of Swedish men's handball champions
- List of Swedish women's handball champions
- List of Swedish Swimming Championships champions (men)
- List of Swedish Swimming Championships champions (women)
