= Lists of cities in Palestine =

The following pages list cities in the Palestine:

- List of cities in Palestine
- List of cities in the Gaza Strip
- List of Israeli settlements

Smaller settlements in the State of Palestine are governed as a municipality or as a village council.

== See also ==
- List of depopulated Israeli settlements in the Gaza Strip
