= Lists of sumo wrestlers =

The following articles contain lists of sumo wrestlers:

- List of active gold star earners
- List of active special prize winners
- List of active sumo wrestlers
- List of heaviest sumo wrestlers
- List of komusubi
- List of ōzeki
- List of Mongolian sumo wrestlers
- List of non-Japanese sumo wrestlers
- List of past sumo wrestlers
- List of sekiwake
- List of sumo elders
- List of sumo record holders
- List of sumo second division champions
- List of sumo stables
- List of sumo top division champions
- List of sumo top division runners-up
- List of yokozuna
