= Lists of unincorporated communities =

These lists of unincorporated communities list places that are not formally incorporated as towns, cities, or similar, despite being populated and locally recognized.

== Canada ==
- List of unincorporated communities in Alberta
- List of unincorporated communities in British Columbia
- List of unincorporated communities in New Brunswick
- List of unincorporated communities in Newfoundland and Labrador
- List of unincorporated communities in Ontario
- List of unincorporated communities in Saskatchewan

== United States ==
- List of unincorporated communities in Alabama
- List of unincorporated communities in Los Angeles County, California
- List of unincorporated communities in Connecticut
- List of unincorporated communities in Illinois
- List of unincorporated communities in Iowa
- List of unincorporated communities in Kansas
- List of unincorporated communities in Louisiana
- List of unincorporated communities in Nebraska
- List of unincorporated communities in North Carolina
- List of unincorporated communities in Oklahoma
- List of unincorporated communities in Oregon
- List of unincorporated communities in South Carolina
- List of unincorporated communities in Texas
- List of unincorporated communities in Virginia
- List of unincorporated communities in Washington
- List of unincorporated communities in Wyoming
