= Lists of landforms in Australia =

The following are lists of landforms in Australia.

- List of caves in Australia
- List of lakes of Australia
- List of mountains in Australia
- List of rivers of Australia
- List of valleys of Australia
