= Lists of schools in Mauritius =

This is a list of schools in Mauritius, listed by type:

- List of secondary schools in Mauritius
- List of tertiary institutions in Mauritius

== See also ==
- Education in Mauritius
