= Lists of radio programs =

This article lists lists of radio programs in different countries:

- List of Canadian radio programs
- List of Estonian radio programs
- List of UK radio programmes
- List of U.S. radio programs
