= Lists of Christmas television episodes =

Lists of Christmas television episodes include:

- List of Christmas television episodes and specials in the United Kingdom
- List of Christmas television specials
- List of United States Christmas television episodes
- List of United States Christmas television specials
