= Lists of college soccer programs =

Lists of college soccer programs cover college soccer programs organized by the National Collegiate Athletic Association (NCAA) in the United States and Canada. They are divided into divisional lists.

== Lists ==
- List of NCAA Division I men's soccer programs
- List of NCAA Division II men's soccer programs
- List of NCAA Division I women's soccer programs
- List of NCAA Division II women's soccer programs
