= Lists of marquessates =

Lists of marquessates or marquisates include:

- List of marquessates in the peerages of Britain and Ireland
- List of marquisates in Norway
- List of French marquesses
- List of Polish noble families with the title of Marquess
- List of marquisates in Portugal

== See also ==
- List of marquesses in the peerages of Britain and Ireland
- Margrave
- List of marches
