= Lists of fictional hybrids =

The following are lists of fictional hybrid characters:

- List of fictional cyborgs
- List of dhampirs - (Half vampires)
- List of werewolves
- List of avian humanoids
- List of hybrid creatures in mythology
- List of piscine and amphibian humanoids
- List of reptilian humanoids
- List of winged unicorns

== See also ==
- List of genetic hybrids
