= Lists of Mesozoic bird-line archosaur genera =

The list of Mesozoic bird-line archosaur genera is split into the following lists:

- List of Mesozoic bird-line archosaur genera (A–B)
- List of Mesozoic bird-line archosaur genera (C–F)
- List of Mesozoic bird-line archosaur genera (G–K)
- List of Mesozoic bird-line archosaur genera (L–O)
- List of Mesozoic bird-line archosaur genera (P–S)
- List of Mesozoic bird-line archosaur genera (T–Z)
