= Lists of online videos =

This is a list of lists of videos.

- List of most-viewed YouTube videos
- List of most-disliked YouTube videos
- List of most-liked YouTube videos
- List of viral music videos
- List of most expensive music videos
- List of viral videos
