= Lists of parks in New Zealand =

This is a list of lists of parks in New Zealand.

- List of parks in the Gisborne District
- List of kauri parks in New Zealand
- List of parks in Nelson, New Zealand
- List of parks in Papatoetoe

== Parks by type ==
- Conservation parks
- Great Walks
- National parks
- Regional parks

== See also ==
- Lists of marae in New Zealand
- Lists of schools in New Zealand
