= Lists of Stargate topics =

The Stargate science fiction drama franchise has spawned multiple series and other media, with a wide range of characters and fictional elements.

== Characters ==
- List of Stargate SG-1 characters
- List of Stargate Atlantis characters
- List of Stargate Infinity characters
- List of Stargate Universe characters

== Episodes ==
- List of Stargate SG-1 episodes
- List of Stargate Atlantis episodes
- List of Stargate Infinity episodes
- List of Stargate Universe episodes

== Media ==
- List of Stargate audiobooks
- List of Stargate comics
- List of Stargate literature

== Elements ==
- Mythology of Stargate
