= Lists of cross-dressers =

The following lists of people who cross-dress include people who cross-dress during wartime so they can serve or avoid service in the armed forces, exóticos, drag queens and drag kings.

== Lists ==
- List of wartime cross-dressers
- List of exóticos
- List of drag kings
- List of drag queens
  - List of RuPaul's Drag Race contestants
- List of cross-dressing characters in animated series

== See also ==
- List of drag groups
- List of androgynous people
- List of transgender people
- Drag (clothing)
- Cross-dressing in film and television
