= Lists of governments of Lithuania =

Lists of governments of Lithuania includes two periods:

- List of governments of Lithuania since 1990
- List of governments of Lithuania (1918–40)
