= Lists of Conan O'Brien sketches =

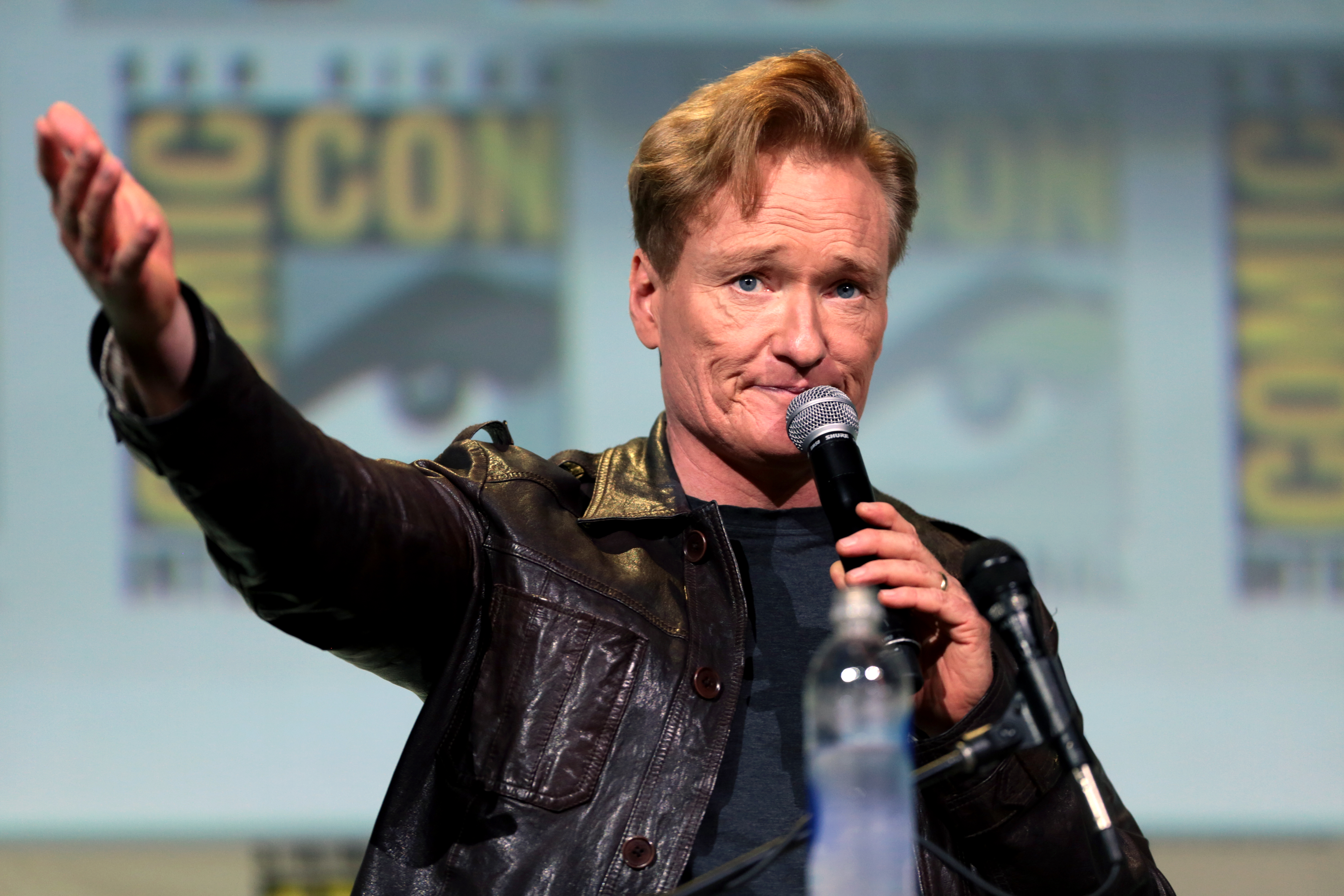

Sketch comedy segments have appeared on each of the three late-night talk shows hosted by Conan O'Brien. They are listed in the following articles:

- List of Late Night with Conan O'Brien sketches, for sketches on Late Night with Conan O'Brien
- List of The Tonight Show with Conan O'Brien sketches, for sketches on The Tonight Show with Conan O'Brien
- List of Conan sketches, for sketches on Conan
