= Lists of Nintendo characters =

List of Nintendo characters covers video game characters owned by Nintendo.

- List of characters in Fire Emblem: Three Houses
- List of Donkey Kong characters
- List of Mario franchise enemies
- List of Paper Mario: The Thousand-Year Door characters
- List of Metroid characters
- List of Punch-Out!! characters
- List of Animal Crossing series characters
- List of The Legend of Zelda: Ocarina of Time characters
- List of The Legend of Zelda: Breath of the Wild and Tears of the Kingdom characters
- List of Pokémon
  - List of generation I Pokémon
  - List of generation II Pokémon
  - List of generation III Pokémon
  - List of generation IV Pokémon
  - List of generation V Pokémon
  - List of generation VI Pokémon
  - List of generation VII Pokémon
  - List of generation VIII Pokémon
  - List of generation IX Pokémon
- List of Star Fox characters
- List of Super Smash Bros. series characters
