= Lists of fatty acids =

Lists of fatty acids include:

- List of saturated fatty acids
- List of unsaturated fatty acids
  - List of omega-3 fatty acids, a class of unsaturated fatty acids

== See also ==
- List of carboxylic acids, all fatty acids are carboxylic acids
- , fatty acyl is an acyl group derived from a fatty acid
