= Lists of hills =

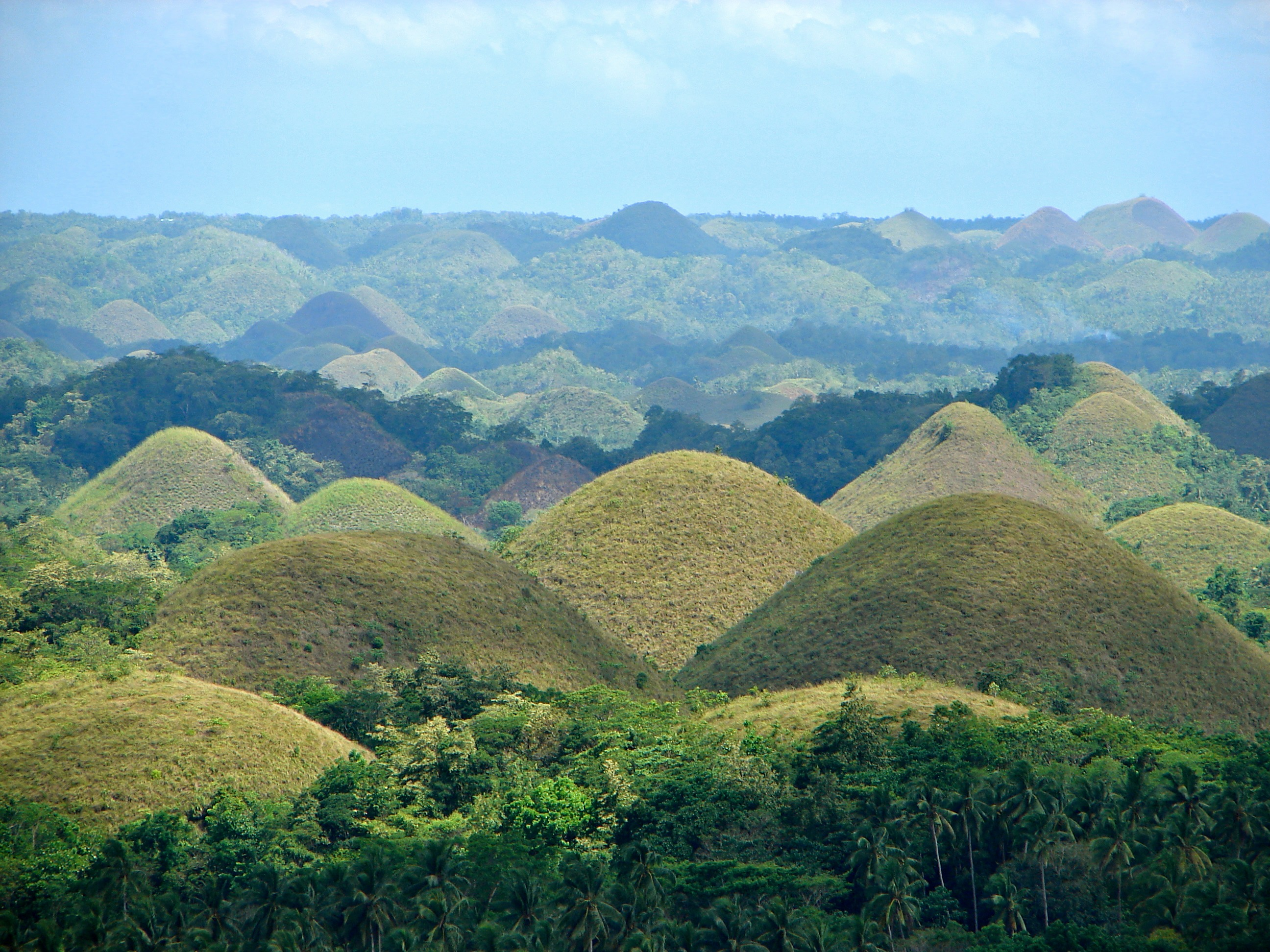
The Chocolate Hills in the Philippines

This is a list of lists of hills. A hill is a landform that extends above the surrounding terrain.

== By form ==
- List of artificial hills
- List of breast-shaped hills

== Germany ==
- List of hills of Berlin
- List of hills of Brandenburg
- List of hills of Hamburg
- List of hills of Mecklenburg-Vorpommern
- List of hills of the Schönbuch
- List of hills of Schleswig-Holstein
- List of hills in the Teutoburg Forest

== United Kingdom ==
- List of Birketts
- List of hills of Cornwall
- List of Dartmoor tors and hills
- List of hills of Devon
- List of hills of Dorset
- List of hills of East Sussex
- List of hills of Gloucestershire
- List of hills of Hampshire
- List of hills of the Isle of Wight
- List of hills of Kent
- List of fells in the Lake District
- List of hills in the Lake District
- List of hills in the North Pennines
- List of hills in the Peak District
- List of hills of Somerset
- List of Wainwrights
- List of hills of West Sussex
- List of hills of Wiltshire
- List of peaks in the Yorkshire Dales
- List of mountains and hills of the Falkland Islands

== United States ==
- List of hills in San Francisco

== See also ==
- List of cities claimed to be built on seven hills
- Lists of highest points
- Lists of mountains
