= Lists of free games =

List of free games include:

- List of open-source video games
- List of freeware video games
- List of commercial games released as freeware
- List of commercial video games with available source code
- List of free PC games
- List of free-to-play PlayStation 4 games
