= Lists of dogs =

For dog type lists see:

- List of individual dogs
  - List of Best in Show winners of Crufts
  - List of Best in Show winners of the Westminster Kennel Club Dog Show
  - List of Labrador Retrievers
  - List of oldest dogs
  - United States presidential pets
- List of fictional dogs
- List of dog breeds
  - U.S. state dogs

For species in the Family Canidae, colloquially referred to as "dogs", see:

- List of canids
