= Lists of monarchs in Spain =

These are lists of monarchs in Spain.

== Monarchs of the current state ==
- List of Spanish monarchs

== Monarchs of former states ==
- Kings of Alpuente, see Alpuente
- List of Aragonese monarchs
- List of viceroys of Aragon (alias lieutenants)
- List of Asturian monarchs
- List of emirs of Badajoz
- List of counts of Barcelona
- List of Castilian monarchs
- List of caliphs of Córdoba
- List of Galician monarchs
- List of Nasrid sultans of Granada
- List of Leonese monarchs
- List of monarchs of Majorca
- Ra'îs of Manûrqa
- List of Navarrese monarchs
- List of Valencian monarchs
- List of Umayyad caliphs

== Nobility ==
- Dukes of Medina-Sidonia
- Viscounts of Barcelona
- Counts of Besalú
- Counts of Cerdanya
- Counts of Empúries
- Counts of Roussillon
- Counts of Urgell

== See also ==
- List of heads of state of Spain
