= Lists of U-boats =

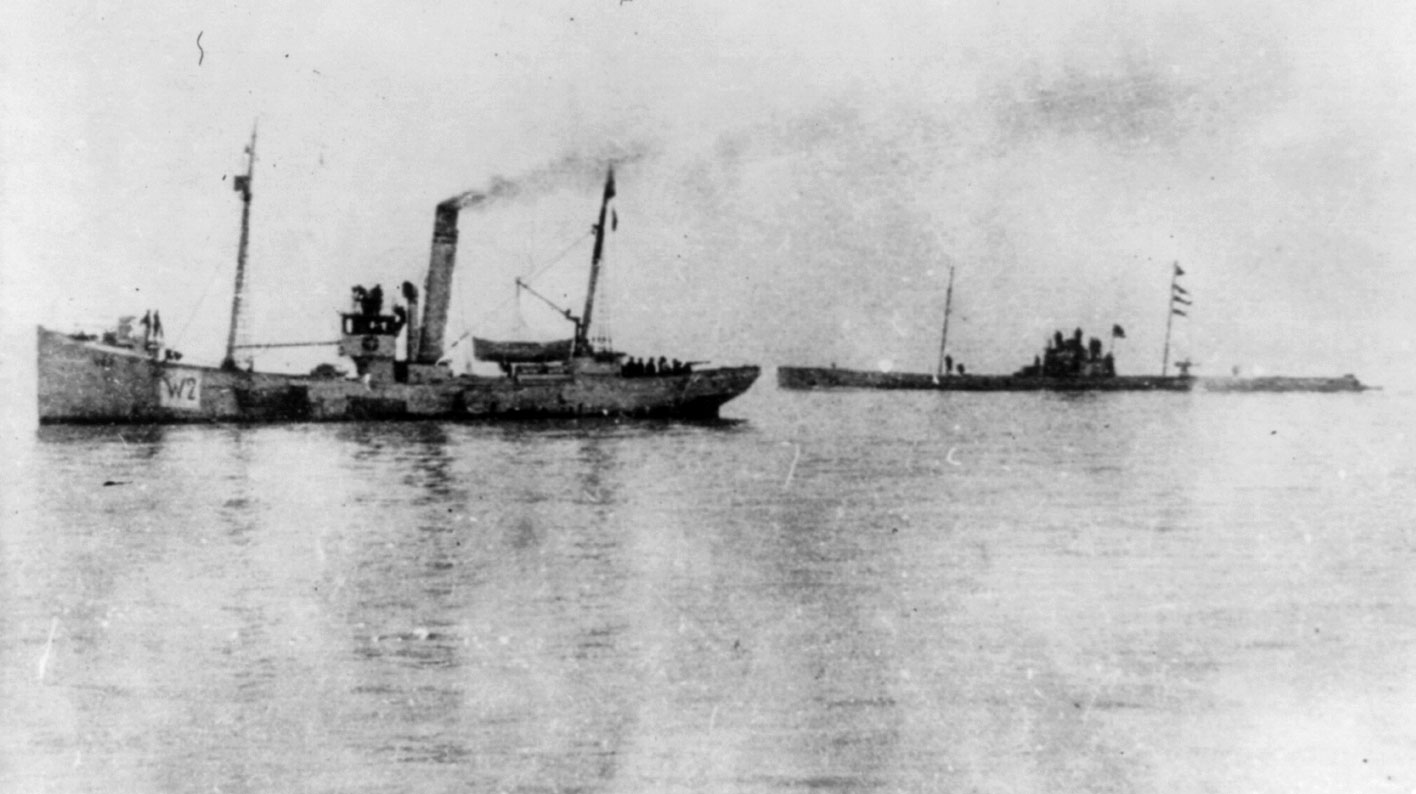
Ship W2 and SM U-28 during the seizure of SS Batavier V on 16 March 1915

Lists of U-boats cover U-boats, military submarines operated by Germany, particularly in the First and Second World Wars.

- List of German U-boats
- List of U-boat types of Germany
- List of U-boat flotillas of Germany
- List of U-boats never deployed of World War II Germany
- Uncompleted U-boat projects of World War II Germany
- List of most successful German U-boats of Germany for kill tonnage in World War I and World War II
- Foreign U-boats of World War II Germany
- List of Austro-Hungarian U-boats

== See also ==
- List of U-boat regions of Germany during World War II
