= Lists of borders =

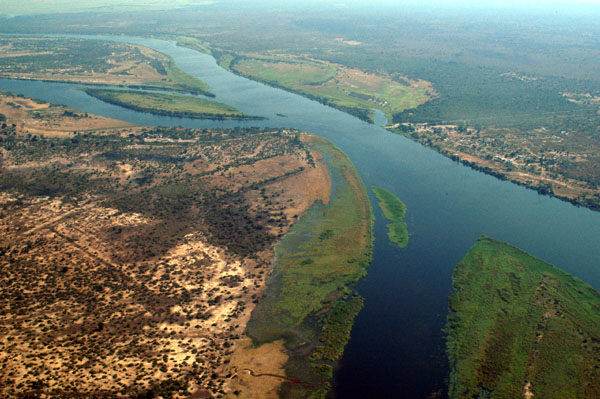
Zambezi River at the junction of Namibia (top left), Zambia (top), Zimbabwe (bottom right), and Botswana (bottom left)

Lists of borders cover land and maritime borders between countries and territories.

== Lists ==
- List of countries and territories by land borders
- List of countries and territories by land and maritime borders
- List of countries and territories by maritime boundaries
- List of international border rivers
- List of land borders with dates of establishment
- List of political and geographic borders

== See also ==
- Boundaries between the continents of Earth
- Category:Border-related lists
