= Lists of Atari games =

== Games by company ==
- List of Atari, Inc. games (1972–1984), games developed or published by the original Atari, Inc.
- List of Atari video games (2001–present), games developed or published by Atari, Inc. under Infogrames ownership
- List of Hasbro Interactive video games, Atari themed games for home systems published by Hasbro Interactive (1998–2000)

== Other Atari companies without separate lists ==
- Atari Corporation, developer and publisher of personal computers and consoles (1984–96)
- Atari Games, developer of arcade games (1984–99)

== Games by Atari platform ==
- List of Atari 8-bit computer games
- List of Atari arcade games
- List of Atari 2600 games
- List of Atari 5200 games
- List of Atari 7800 games
- List of Atari ST games
- List of Atari XEGS games
- List of Atari Lynx games
- List of Atari Jaguar games
- Atari Flashback § Games by Flashback version
