= Lists of graphics cards =

Lists of graphics cards follow. A graphics card, or graphics processing unit, is a specialized electronic circuit that rapidly manipulates and alters memory to build images in a frame buffer for output to a display. By manufacturer, they include:

- List of AMD graphics processing units
- Intel Graphics Technology
- List of Nvidia graphics processing units
