= Lists of public transport routes =

This is a list of lists of public transport routes.

- List of public transport routes in Adelaide
- List of public transport routes numbered 1
- List of public transport routes numbered 2
- List of public transport routes numbered 3
- List of public transport routes numbered 4
- List of public transport routes numbered 5
- List of public transport routes numbered 6
- List of public transport routes numbered 7
- List of public transport routes numbered 8
- List of public transport routes numbered 9
- List of public transport routes numbered 10
- List of public transport routes numbered 11
- List of public transport routes numbered 12
- List of public transport routes numbered 13
- List of public transport routes numbered 14
- List of public transport routes numbered 15
- List of public transport routes numbered 16
- List of public transport routes numbered 17
- List of public transport routes numbered 18
- List of public transport routes numbered 19
