= Lists of database management systems =

Lists of database management systems provide indexes and/or comparisons of different types of database management system. They include:

- List of relational database management systems, for database management systems based on the relational model.
- Comparison of object database management systems, showing what fundamental object database features are implemented natively
- Document-oriented database, for storing, retrieving and managing document-oriented information
- List of column-oriented DBMSes that store data tables by column rather than by row
- List of in-memory databases, which primarily rely on main memory for computer data storage

See Category:Database management systems for a complete lists of articles about database management systems.
