= Lists of bills in the United States Congress =

The following are lists of bills in the United States Congress:

- List of bills in the 113th United States Congress
- List of bills in the 114th United States Congress
- List of bills in the 115th United States Congress
- List of bills in the 116th United States Congress
- List of bills in the 117th United States Congress
- List of bills in the 118th United States Congress
- List of bills in the 119th United States Congress
