= Lists of College Football Hall of Fame inductees =

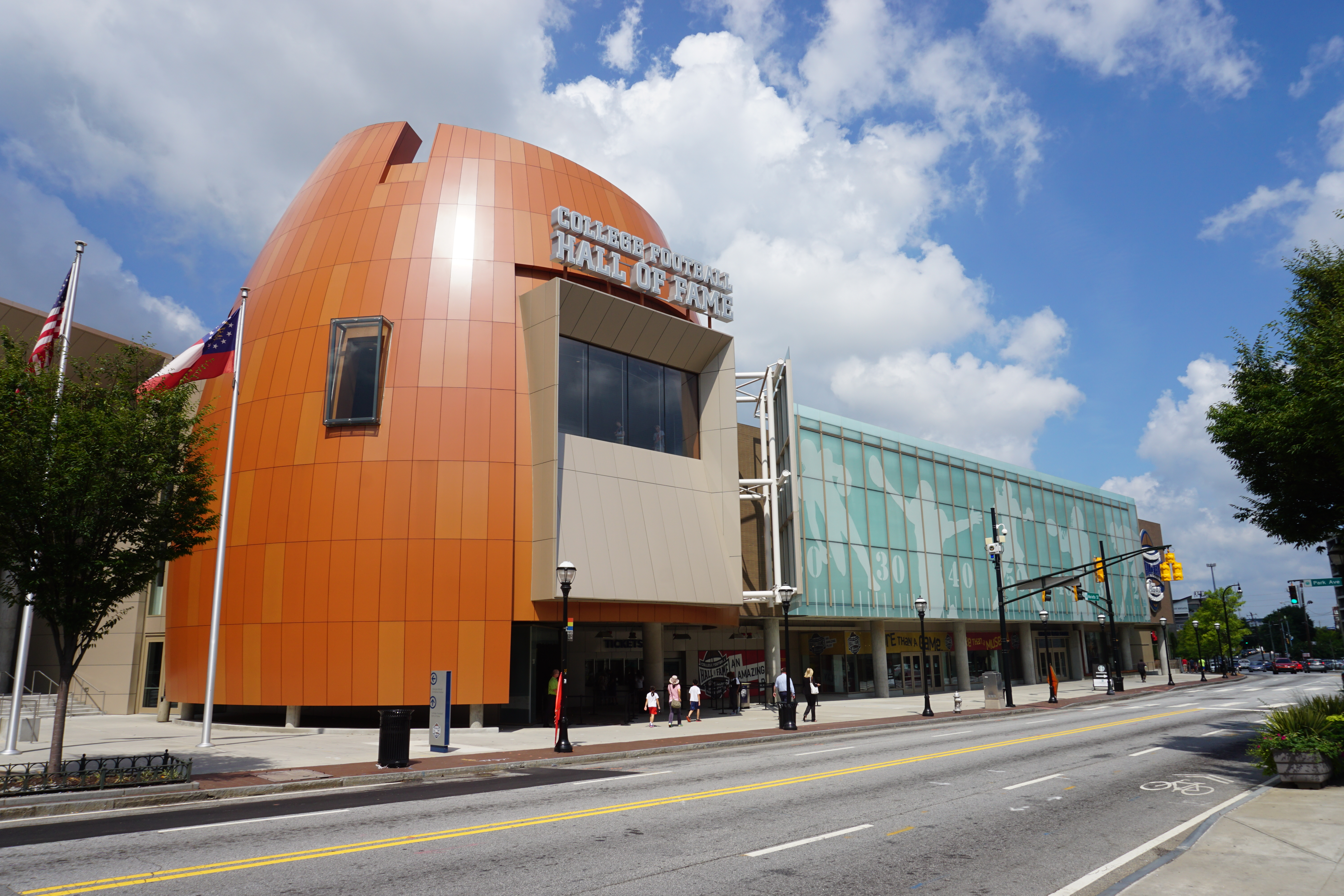
College Football Hall of Fame in Atlanta, Georgia

The List of College Football Hall of Fame inductees is divided into alphabetical lists of players and of coaches who have been inducted into the College Football Hall of Fame, which is devoted to celebrating college football in the United States. The museum is operated by the non-profit National Football Foundation and is in Atlanta, Georgia.

Including the 2019 class, there were 1,010 players and 219 coaches enshrined in the College Football Hall of Fame, representing 311 schools.

== Lists ==
- List of College Football Hall of Fame inductees (players)
- List of College Football Hall of Fame inductees (coaches)
