= Lists of Formula One records =

The following are lists of Formula One records:

- List of Formula One driver records
- List of Formula One constructor records
- List of Formula One engine records
- List of Formula One tyre records
- List of Formula One race records
