= Lists of Padma Bhushan award recipients =

List of recipients of a civilian award in India

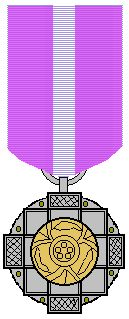

Lists of Padma Bhushan award recipients cover people who have received the Padma Bhushan award from the Republic of India for "distinguished service of a high order...without distinction of race, occupation, position or sex." The lists are organized by period.

- List of Padma Bhushan award recipients (1954–1959)
- List of Padma Bhushan award recipients (1960–1969)
- List of Padma Bhushan award recipients (1970–1979)
- List of Padma Bhushan award recipients (1980–1989)
- List of Padma Bhushan award recipients (1990–1999)
- List of Padma Bhushan award recipients (2000–2009)
- List of Padma Bhushan award recipients (2010–2019)
- List of Padma Bhushan award recipients (2020–2029)
