= List of tallest buildings in Staten Island =

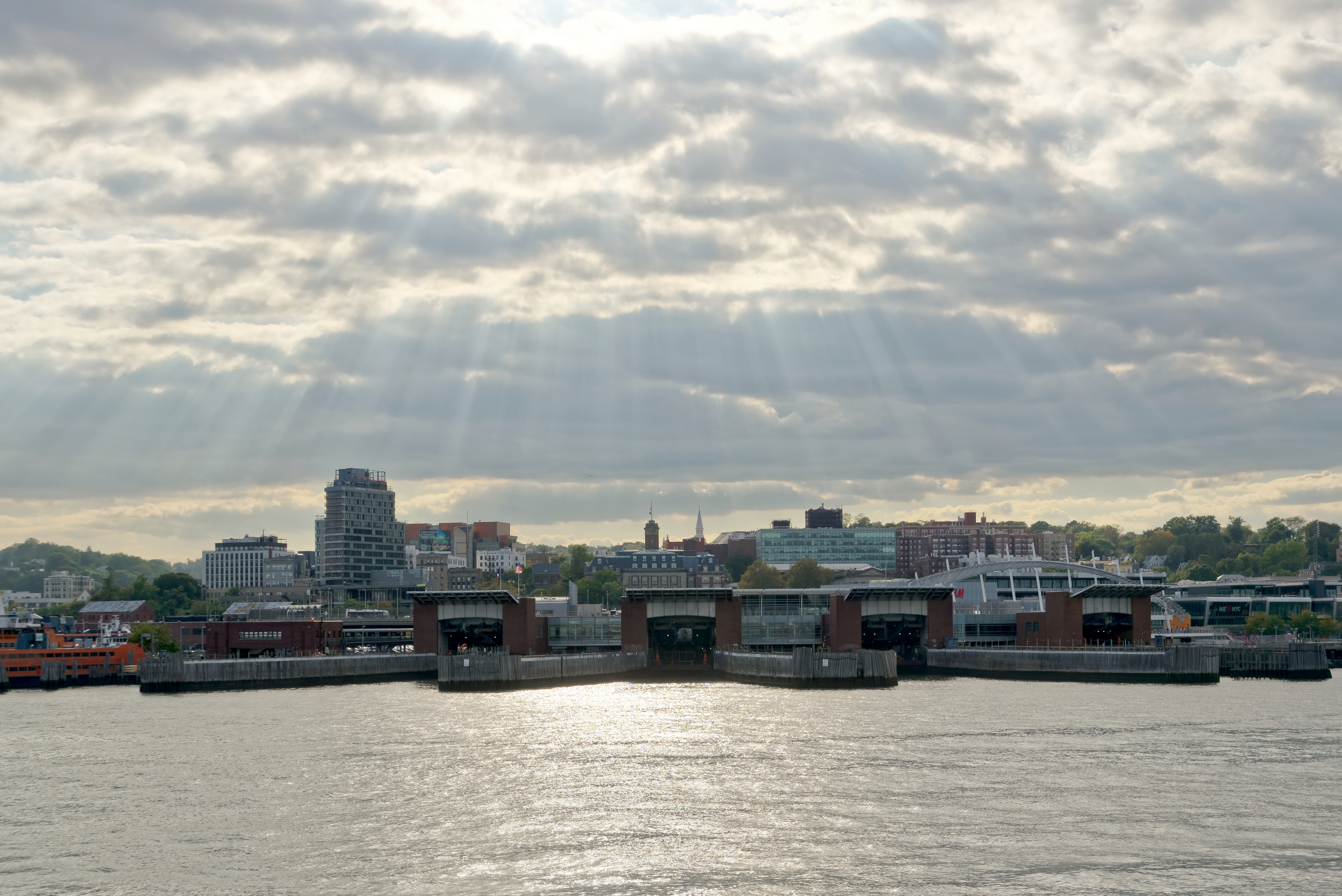
Skyline of St. George

Staten Island is the only borough of New York City to not have any skyscrapers, by the definition of 330 feet or taller. Despite this, it has a considerable number of tall buildings, especially in the North Shore. The tallest building on the island is believed to be the Old Church of St. Joachim and St. Anne, though the borough government estimated the tallest building to be 185 Castleton Park Tower in 2015.

== List ==
This list only contains buildings that are 100 feet tall or taller.

Rank	Name	Image	Height ft (m)	Floors	Year	Address	Notes
1	Old Church of St. Joachim and St. Anne		225 (69)	1	1891	Old Church of St. Joachim and St. Anne	Church in Pleasant Plains. Most likely tallest building on Staten Island.
2	185 Castleton Park Tower		208–222 (63–68)	19–20	1976	185 St. Marks Place	High rise apartment building with 454 units in St George. Part of the Castleton Park Apartments. Despite the Mount Loretto Church being 225 feet tall, the borough government claimed in 2015 that it was the tallest building on the island. Either 19 or 20 floors.
3	Parkview House Apartments		188 (57)	17	1960 or 1962	660–700 Victory Boulevard	High-rise apartment building complex in Grymes Hill.
4	165 Castleton Park Tower		185 (56)	19–20	1976	165 St. Marks Place	High rise apartment building in St George. Part of the Castleton Park Apartments. Either 19 or 20 floors.
=5	Ocean View Condominiums		155 (47)	14	1989	31–49 Hylan Boulevard	High rise apartment building complex in Rosebank.
=5	Harborview Hall		155 (47)	14	1968	1 Campus Road	High rise dormitories for students of Wagner College in Port Richmond.
6	80 Bay Street Landing		154 (47)	10	1982	80 Bay Street Landing	Luxury low-rise apartment building with 131 units in St George.
7	Arlington Terrace Apartments		144 (44)	13	1974	85–87 Holland Avenue, 6–12 Federal Place	High rise apartment building complex in Arlington.
8	Sunrise Tower		133 (41)	12	1987	755 Narrows Road North	High rise apartment building in Grymes Hill.
9	The View		125 (38)	11	2012	224 Richmond Terrace	Luxury low-rise apartment building with 40 units in St George.
=10	Corporate Commons Three		114 (35)	7–8	2021	1441 South Ave	Mixed-use corporate building in The Teleport; includes a school and cancer treatment site.
=10	Hilton Garden Inn, Staten Island		114 (35)	6	2011	1100 South Ave	Hilton Garden Inn branch in The Teleport.
=11	Supreme Court of New York, Richmond County		111 (34)	Unknown	1919	26 Central Avenue	Courthouse in St George. 5th Richmond County Courthouse, includes offices of New York Supreme Court in Richmond County and others.
=11	The Fountains Apartments		111 (34)	11	1919	1000–1100 Clove Rd	Low-rise apartment building complex in Castleton Corners.
12	Esplanade Staten Island		110 (34)	10	Unknown	1415 Richmond Avenue	Luxury low-rise senior apartment building in Bulls Head.
13	60 Bay Street		107 (33)	10	Unknown	60 Bay Street	Office building in St George.
14	10 Bay Street Landing		103 (31)	7	1982	10 Bay Street Landing	Luxury low-rise apartment building with 128 units in St George.
15	The Accolade at Bay Street Landing		101 (31)	9	1900	90 Bay Street Landing	Low-rise luxury apartment building with 103 units in St George. Previously owned by Pete Davidson.
=16	New Lane Area		100 (30)	10	1984	70 New Lane	Low-rise senior living apartment building complex in Rosebank.
=16	20 Cliff Street		100 (30)	9	1964	20 Cliff Street	Low-rise apartment building in Shore Acres.
=16	Bayley Seton Hospital		100 (30)	9	1930	75 Vanderbilt Avenue	Hospital in Stapleton.
=16	New Vanderbilt Rehabilitation & Care Center		100 (30)	9	1972	135 Vanderbilt Ave	Rehabilitation center in Clifton.
