= Lists of crossings of the Hudson River =

For crossings of the Hudson River, see:

- List of fixed crossings of the Hudson River (bridges and tunnels)
- List of ferries across the Hudson River to New York City
