= Lists of vampires =

Lists of vampires may refer to:

- List of vampires
- List of vampiric creatures in folklore
- List of dhampirs
