= Lists of people with inflammatory bowel disease =

Lists of people with inflammatory bowel disease include:

- List of people diagnosed with Crohn's disease
- List of people diagnosed with ulcerative colitis
