= Lists of political memoirs =

Lists of political memoirs include:

- List of American political memoirs
- List of Australian political memoirs
- List of British political memoirs
- List of memoirs of political prisoners
