= Lists of schools in South Africa =

- List of high schools in South Africa
- List of primary schools in South Africa
- List of secondary schools in the Western Cape
