= Lists of national institutions =

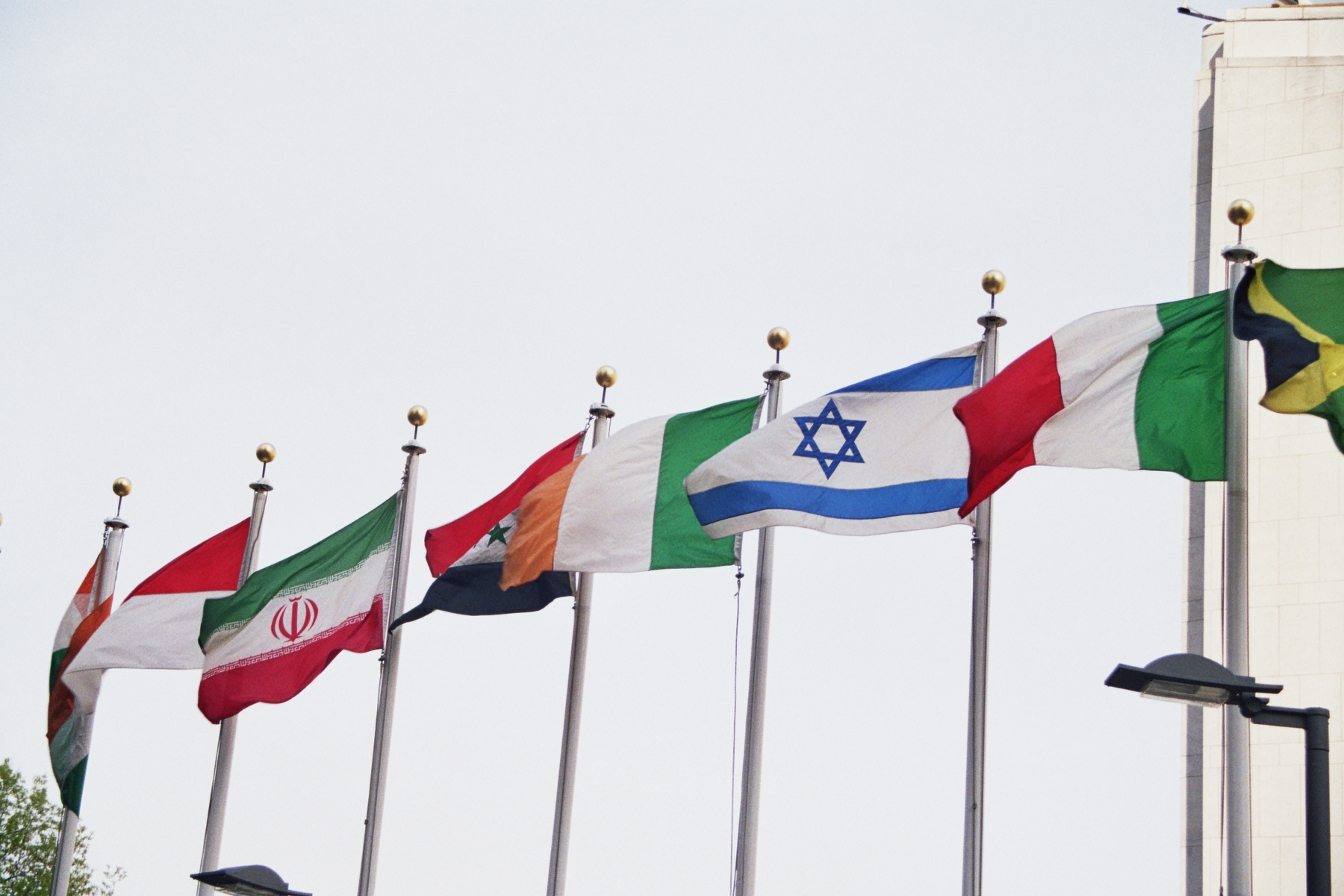
Flags at the United Nations headquarters 2006

Lists of national institutions cover various transnational lists associated with nation states. These include lists related to government, services, sports and culture.

== Government ==
- Lists of countries and territories
- List of sovereign states
- List of member states of the United Nations
- List of national border changes since World War I
- List of national capitals
- List of national constitutions
- List of national governments
- List of current heads of state and government
- List of legislatures by country
- List of supreme courts by country

== Services ==
- List of national and international statistical services
- List of national archives
- List of flag-carrying airlines
- List of law enforcement agencies
- List of national and state libraries
- List of national newspapers
- List of national parks
- List of national parks in the Alps

== Sports ==
- National sport
- List of women's national association football teams
- List of men's national association football teams
- List of International Rugby League members
- List of international rugby union teams
- List of NHL statistical leaders by country
- List of national netball teams

== Culture ==
- National poet
- National poetry
- State religion
- List of national theatres
