= Lists of research stations =

Lists of research stations provide indexes to research stations in a particular region. They include:

- List of space stations
- Research stations in Antarctica
- List of research stations in the Arctic

Refer to category:Research stations for a complete list of articles on research stations.
