= Lists of Canadian federal elections =

There are several lists of Canadian federal elections:

- List of Canadian federal general elections, for Canada under Confederation since 1867
- List of federal by-elections in Canada, for Canada under Confederation since 1867
- List of elections in the Province of Canada, for the federated colony of "Province of Canada" of the British Empire, the United Canadas, of Canada East/Lower Canada and Canada West/Upper Canada
