= Lists of baronies =

Lists of baronies include:

- List of baronies in the peerages of Britain and Ireland
- List of Polish noble families with the title of Baron
- List of baronies in Portugal

== See also ==
- List of barons in the peerages of Britain and Ireland
- Barony (county division)
  - List of baronies of Ireland
- Feudal baron
