= Lists of libertarian topics =

Lists of libertarian topics include:

- List of libertarian organizations
- List of libertarian political parties
- List of libertarians in the United States
