= Lists of professional bodybuilders =

The following articles contain lists of professional bodybuilders:

- List of female professional bodybuilders
- List of male professional bodybuilders
- List of British bodybuilders
- List of German bodybuilders
