= Lists of ancient tribes in the Balkans =

Lists of ancient tribes in the Balkans

- List of ancient tribes in Thrace and Dacia
- List of ancient tribes in Illyria
- List of ancient Greek tribes
