= Lists of rulers of Kenya =

This is a list of rulers and office-holders of Kenya.

== Heads of state ==
- Heads of State of Kenya

== Heads of government ==
- Heads of Government of Kenya

== Colonial governors ==
- Colonial Heads of Kenya
- Colonial Heads of Mombasa

== Heads of former states ==
- Rulers of the Masai
- Rulers of the Nandi
- Rulers of Pate
- Rulers of Wanga
- Rulers of Wituland

== See also ==
- Lists of office-holders
