= Lists of elephants =

Lists of elephants include:

- List of elephantids
- List of elephants in mythology and religion
- List of individual elephants
- List of fictional pachyderms
