= Lists of law enforcement officers killed =

This is a list of lists of law enforcement officers killed in the line of duty by country.

- Canada - List of law enforcement officers killed in the line of duty in Canada
- China - List of People's Armed Police personnel killed in the line of duty
- Ireland - List of Gardaí killed in the line of duty
- Malaysia - List of Malaysian police officers killed in the line of duty
- New Zealand - List of New Zealand police officers killed in the line of duty
- Singapore - List of Singapore police officers killed in the line of duty
- United Kingdom - List of British police officers killed in the line of duty
- United States - List of law enforcement officers killed in the line of duty in the United States, List of FBI employees killed in the line of duty
