= Lists of academic chancellors and vice chancellors =

The title of Chancellor or Vice-Chancellor is used by many academic institutions:

== Lists of chancellors ==
- Chancellor of the College of William & Mary
- List of chancellors of Durham University
- Queen's University, Belfast
- University of Cambridge
- University of London
- University of Massachusetts Amherst
- University of Oxford

== Lists of chancellors, vice-chancellors and presidents ==
- List of chancellors, vice-chancellors and presidents of the Royal Melbourne Institute of Technology

== Lists of chancellors and vice-chancellors ==
- British universities
- Canadian universities
- South African universities
- University of Pretoria

== Lists of vice-chancellors ==
- List of vice-chancellors of Bangladeshi universities
- Aligarh Muslim University
- Banaras Hindu University
- Durham University
- Indira Gandhi National Open University
- John Moores University
- Nigerian universities
- Queen's University, Belfast
- University of Auckland
- University of Cambridge
- University of Cape Town
- University of Hertfordshire
- University of Hong Kong
- University of London
- University of Malaya
- University of Oxford
- University of Wales, Trinity Saint David

== See also ==
- Austria
- Germany
- List of chancellors of Transylvania
