= Lists of mobile phones =

List of mobile phones may refer to:

- Comparison of Google Pixel smartphones
- Comparison of open-source mobile phones
- List of best-selling mobile phones
- List of BlackBerry products
- List of countries by number of mobile numbers in use
- List of Huawei phones
- List of iPhone models
- List of large sensor camera phones
- List of LG mobile phones
- List of mobile phone brands by country
- List of mobile phones with FWVGA display
- List of mobile phones with WVGA display
- List of Nokia products
- List of open-source mobile phones
- List of Sony Ericsson products
- List of Windows Mobile devices
