= Lists of noble families =

The following lists of noble families is sorted by country:

- List of Bavarian noble families
- List of Belgian noble families
- List of Croatian noble families
- List of Dutch noble families
- List of Finnish noble families
- List of Georgian noble families
- List of Norwegian noble families
- List of Polish noble families
- List of Russian noble families
- List of Swedish noble families

== See also ==
- List of wealthiest families
- List of political families
- List of show business families
