= List of non-profit space agencies =

Types of non-profit space organisations

Non-profit space agencies include:

- Arizona State University, Milo Space Science Institute (United States)
- Celestrak.org (United States)
- Center for the Advancement of Science in Space (United States)
- International Space Science Institute (Switzerland)
- KAIST Satellite Technology Research Center (South Korea)
- Mars Institute (United States)
- Space Foundation (United States)
- The Planetary Society (United States)
- WARR (TUM), Technical University of Munich (Germany)
- SpaceIL (Israel)
- SpaceU (Poland)
- Libre Space Foundation (Greece)

== See also ==
- List of government space agencies
- List of private spaceflight companies
