= Lists of current NFL team rosters =

The following are lists of current National Football League (NFL) team rosters:

- For American Football Conference (AFC) rosters please see List of current AFC team rosters.
- For National Football Conference (NFC) rosters please see List of current NFC team rosters.
