= List of international cricket centuries by Aravinda de Silva =

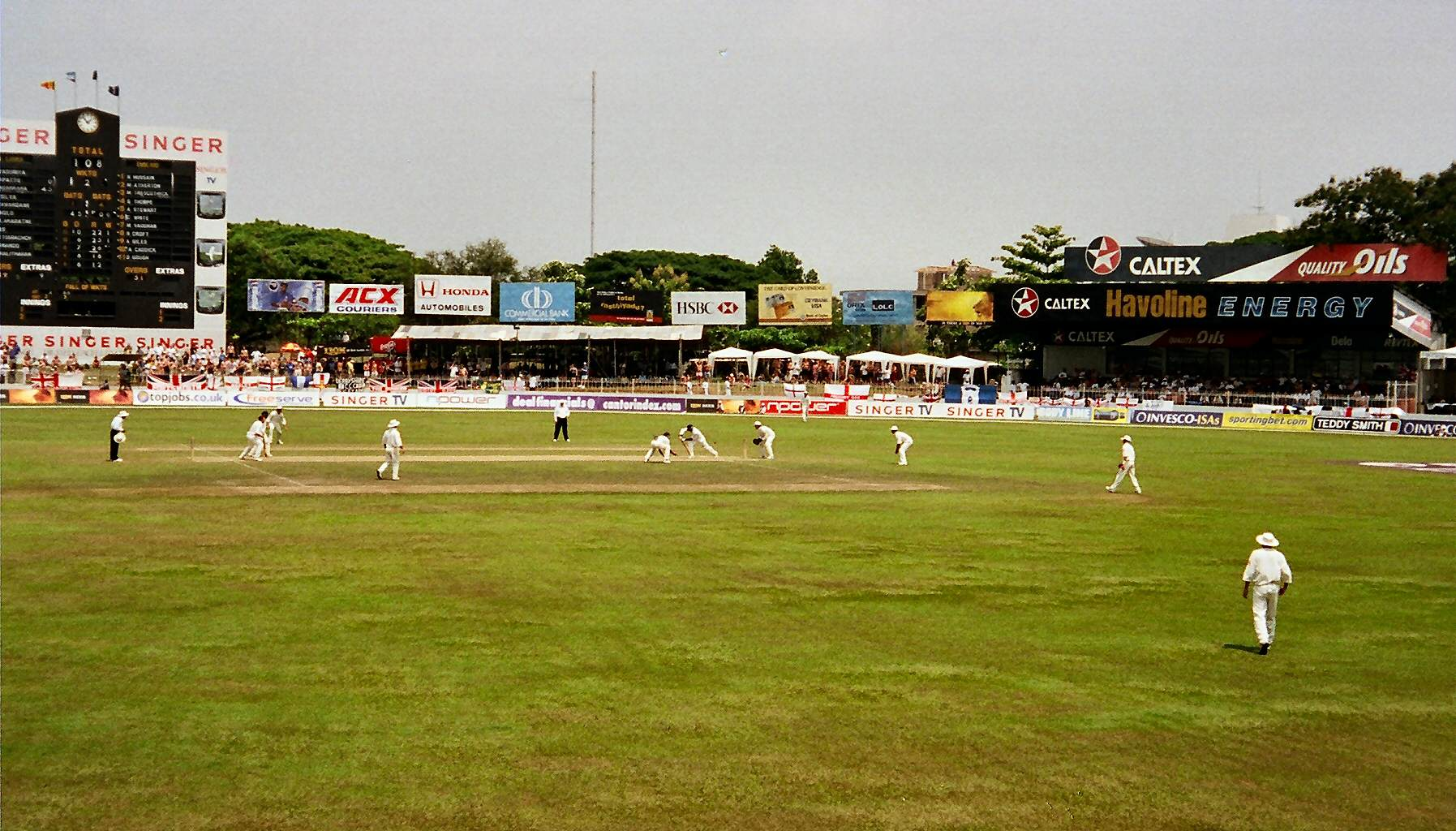
Aravinda de Silva scored seven of his thirty-one international cricket centuries at the Sinhalese Sports Club Ground.

Pinnaduwage Aravinda de Silva is a former cricketer and captain of the Sri Lanka national cricket team. He scored centuries (scores of 100 runs or more in a single innings) in Test and One Day International (ODI) cricket matches organised by the International Cricket Council (ICC). He was named as one of the Wisden Cricketers of the Year in 1996. Identified as "one of the game's best entertainers" by Cricinfo's Simon Wilde, De Silva scored 20 centuries in Tests and 11 in ODIs.

De Silva debuted in 1984 and scored his first Test century in October 1985 against Pakistan. In a man-of-the-match performance, he scored 122 in an eight-and-a-half-hours innings. He made centuries in both innings of a match when he scored 138 and 103 – not out in both innings – in the second Test of the 1997 series against Pakistan, and as of March 2022, he is the only player to score unbeaten centuries in both innings of a Test. He repeated the feat of scoring centuries in both innings in the same year, when he scored 146 and 120 against India in another man-of-the-match performance. De Silva's highest Test score of 267, achieved in January 1991 in Wellington, was reached in 380 balls against New Zealand. The performance is the sixth-highest score by a Sri Lankan batsman in Test cricket. De Silva scored his twenty Test centuries against seven different opponents, and was most successful against Pakistan, making eight. As of April 2013, he is thirty-fourth in the international Test century-makers list, (Note: De Silva shares the position with Ken Barrington, Mark Waugh and Graham Gooch.) and third in the Sri Lankan list.

De Silva's maiden ODI century was against India in 1990; he scored 104 runs off 124 balls. His highest score in ODIs is 145, against Kenya in the 1996 Cricket World Cup. His score led Sri Lanka to 398, the highest ODI total by any team at that time; (Note: The record was surpassed by Australia, which made 434 runs in March 2006. However it was outstripped in the same match when South Africa made 438 runs. As of January 2013, the record lies with Sri Lanka which made 443 runs against the Netherlands in July 2006.) it was also the first century made by a Sri Lankan in a World Cup. He also scored a century in the second innings of the final, making 107 runs not out. As of April 2013, he is twenty-sixth in the list of all-time ODI century-makers and sixth in the equivalent list for Sri Lanka. (Note: De Silva shares the position with Gordon Greenidge, Marvan Atapattu, Shivnarine Chanderpaul, Viv Richards and Gautam Gambhir.) He was most successful against Pakistan, scoring 11 centuries in both Tests and ODIs put together. De Silva also holds the record for the tenth-fastest Test double century, which he attained while playing against Bangladesh in 2002.

== Key ==
An innings-by-innings breakdown of De Silva's Test match batting career, showing runs scored (red bars, green for not out) and the average of the last ten innings (blue line)

Key for the tables
Symbol	Meaning
*	Remained not out
†	Man of the Match
Pos.	Position in the batting order
Inn.	The innings of the match
Test	The number of the Test match played in that series
H/A/N	Venue was at home (Sri Lanka), away or neutral
Date	Date the match was held, or the starting date of match for Test matches
Lost	The match was lost by Sri Lanka.
Won	The match was won by Sri Lanka.
Drawn	The match was drawn.

== Test centuries ==
List of Test centuries scored by Aravinda de Silva
No.	Score	Balls (Note: The number of balls played for the first two centuries were not recorded.)	Against	Pos.	Inn.	Test	Venue	H/A/N	Date	Result	Ref
1	122 †	—	Pakistan	7	1	1/3	Iqbal Stadium, Faisalabad	Away	16 October 1985	Drawn	
2	105 †	—	Pakistan	3	3	3/3	National Stadium, Karachi	Away	7 November 1985	Lost	
3	167 †	361	Australia	5	2	1/2	Brisbane Cricket Ground, Brisbane	Away	8 December 1989	Drawn	
4	267	380	New Zealand	4	2	1/3	Basin Reserve, Wellington	Away	31 January 1991	Drawn	
5	123 †	193	New Zealand	4	3	3/3	Eden Park, Auckland	Away	1 March 1991	Drawn	
6	148	297	India	4	1	3/3	Paikiasothy Saravanamuttu Stadium, Colombo	Home	4 August 1993	Drawn	
7	127	156	Pakistan	4	2	1/3	Paikiasothy Saravanamuttu Stadium, Colombo	Home	9 August 1994	Drawn	
8	105	316	Pakistan	4	3	2/3	Iqbal Stadium, Faisalabad	Away	15 September 1995	Won	
9	168	383	Pakistan	3	3	1/2	R. Premadasa Stadium, Colombo	Home	19 April 1997	Drawn	
10	138* †	208	Pakistan	4	1	2/2	Sinhalese Sports Club Ground, Colombo	Home	26 April 1997	Drawn	
11	103* †	99	Pakistan	4	3	2/2	Sinhalese Sports Club Ground, Colombo	Home	26 April 1997	Drawn	
12	126	211	India	4	2	1/2	R. Premadasa Stadium, Colombo	Home	2 August 1997	Drawn	
13	146 †	226	India	4	1	2/2	Sinhalese Sports Club Ground, Colombo	Home	9 August 1997	Drawn	
14	120 †	198	India	4	3	2/2	Sinhalese Sports Club Ground, Colombo	Home	9 August 1997	Drawn	
15	110* †	263	India	4	3	1/3	Punjab Cricket Association Stadium, Mohali	Away	19 November 1997	Drawn	
16	143* †	310	Zimbabwe	4	4	2/2	Sinhalese Sports Club Ground, Colombo	Home	14 January 1998	Won	
17	152	292	England	4	2	1/1	Kennington Oval, London	Away	27 August 1998	Won	
18	112 †	276	Pakistan	4	2	1/3	Rawalpindi Cricket Stadium, Rawalpindi	Away	26 February 2000	Won	
19	106	243	England	4	1	1/3	Galle International Stadium, Galle	Home	22 February 2001	Won	
20	206	234	Bangladesh	5	2	1/2	Paikiasothy Saravanamuttu Stadium, Colombo	Home	21 July 2002	Won	

== One Day International centuries ==
List of ODI centuries scored by Aravinda de Silva
No.	Score	Balls	Against	Pos.	Inn.	S/R	Venue	H/A/N	Date	Result	Ref
1	104	124	India	4	2	83.87	Vidarbha Cricket Association Ground, Nagpur	Away	1 December 1990	Lost	
2	105 †	105	Australia	4	2	100.00	Paikiasothy Saravanamuttu Stadium, Colombo	Home	15 August 1992	Won	
3	107* †	100	Zimbabwe	4	1	107.00	Harare Sports Club, Harare	Away	6 November 1994	Won	
4	145 †	115	Kenya	4	1	126.08	Asgiriya Stadium, Kandy	Home	6 March 1996	Won	
5	107* †	124	Australia	4	2	86.29	Gaddafi Stadium, Lahore	Neutral	17 March 1996	Won	
6	127* †	123	Zimbabwe	4	2	103.25	Sinhalese Sports Club Ground, Colombo	Home	3 September 1996	Won	
7	122	116	Pakistan	4	2	105.17	Gymkhana Club Ground, Nairobi	Neutral	4 October 1996	Lost	
8	134 †	131	Pakistan	4	1	102.29	Sharjah Cricket Association Stadium, Sharjah	Neutral	7 April 1997	Won	
9	104 †	117	India	4	1	88.88	Sinhalese Sports Club Ground, Colombo	Home	24 August 1997	Won	
10	102*	90	Pakistan	4	2	113.33	Gaddafi Stadium, Lahore	Away	5 November 1997	Won	
11	105	94	India	3	2	111.70	R. Premadasa Stadium, Colombo	Home	7 July 1998	Lost	
