= Lists of gun cartridges =

Lists of gun cartridges contain articles about gun cartridges of different types. Cartridges can be classified by type of firearm, by caliber or by type of primer (e.g. centerfire, rimfire). See Category:Cartridge families for more information on different categories of cartridges. The lists include:

== Type of firearm ==
- List of rebated rim cartridges
- List of rifle cartridges
- List of Shotgun cartridges
- List of handgun cartridges
- Table of handgun and rifle cartridges

== Caliber ==
- List of cartridges by caliber

== Primer ==
- List of rimfire cartridges
- List of Winchester Center Fire cartridges
