= Lists of Australian rules football leagues =

Lists of Australian rules football leagues include:

- List of Australian rules football leagues in Australia – men's leagues in Australia.
- Australian rules football leagues in regional Queensland – leagues in Queensland, Australia.
- List of former South Australian regional football leagues – defunct leagues in South Australia.
- List of women's Australian rules football leagues – women's leagues around the world.
- Countries playing Australian rules football – men's leagues around the world.
