= Lists of political office-holders in Serbia =

These are lists of political office-holders in Serbia.

== Heads of state ==
- List of presidents of Serbia
- List of prime ministers of Serbia
- List of Serbian monarchs
- List of heads of state of Yugoslavia
- List of presidents of Serbia and Montenegro

== Nobility ==
- Magnates of the Fall of the Serbian Empire

== Theological ==
- List of heads of the Serbian Orthodox Church
  - List of metropolitans of Montenegro (Prince-Bishops after 1697)

== Other ==
- List of Serbian regents
- List of local rulers of Vojvodina

== See also ==
- Lists of office-holders
