= Lists of African Union members =

This is a list of lists of African Union members:

- List of African Union member states by political system
- Member states of the African Union (may be sorted by name, population, area etc.)
