= Lists of Korean names =

There are the following lists of Korean names:

- List of Korean given names
- List of the most popular given names in South Korea
- List of Korean surnames

== See also ==
- Korean name
- Category:Korean-language surnames
- Category:Korean given names
