= Lists of DC Comics publications =

The following are lists of DC Comics publications:

- List of current DC Comics publications
- List of DC Comics publications (A–B)
- List of DC Comics publications (C–F)
- List of DC Comics publications (G–J)
- List of DC Comics publications (K–O)
- List of DC Comics publications (P–S)
- List of DC Comics publications (T–Z)
