= Lists of churches in the Archdiocese of Los Angeles =

For list of Catholic churches in the Archdiocese of Los Angeles, see the lists by pastoral region:

- Our Lady of the Angels, for central and West Los Angeles
- San Fernando, covering the San Fernando, Santa Clarita and Antelope Valleys.
- San Gabriel, for East Los Angeles the San Gabriel Valley and the Pomona Valley.
- San Pedro, for Long Beach and southern Los Angeles County.
- Santa Barbara, for Santa Barbara and Ventura Counties.
