= Lists of Wizarding World cast members =

Lists of Wizarding World cast members cover cast members of productions by Wizarding World, a fantasy media franchise. The lists include cast members of feature films.

- List of Wizarding World cast members

- List of Harry Potter (film series) cast members
- List of Fantastic Beasts cast members
- List of Harry Potter (TV series) cast members

- List of Harry Potter and the Cursed Child cast members
