= Lists of highways in Michigan =

List of highways in Michigan includes:

- List of state trunkline highways in Michigan
- List of Interstate Highways in Michigan
- List of U.S. Highways in Michigan
- List of county-designated highways in Michigan

== See also ==
- Michigan State Trunkline Highway System
