= List of international cricket centuries by Mahela Jayawardene =

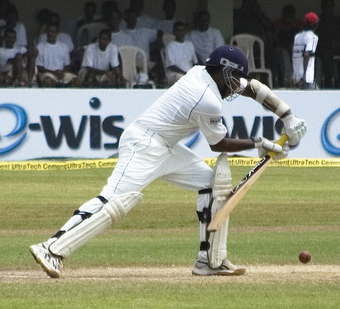
Mahela Jayawardene has scored 54 centuries in international cricket.

Mahela Jayawardene is a retired Sri Lankan cricketer and a former captain of the Sri Lanka national cricket team. He has been described as one of the best batsmen produced by the country. Jayawardene was the leading run-scorer for Sri Lanka in Tests, after fellow Sri Lankan Kumar Sangakkara surpassed him, and Mahela has scored 35 centuries. He has scored 19 centuries in his One Day International (ODI) career, and is the fourth-highest run-scorer for Sri Lanka. On 9 November 2014, he scored his 17th ODI century against India and also became only the 5th player to score 12,000 runs in One Day Internationals, after Sachin Tendulkar, Sanath Jayasuriya, Ricky Ponting & teammate Kumar Sangakkara. He is the highest scorer for the country in Twenty20 International (T20I) matches as well, and has scored one century. Jayawardene was chosen as captain of the International Cricket Council's (ICC) World One Day International team and selected as Captain of the Year at the 2006 ICC Awards. He was recognized as one of the Wisden Cricketers of the Year in 2007, and was a member of the ICC World Test team the following year.

Jayawardene's debut Test match was against India in August 1997, in which the Sri Lankan team made a world record 952 runs for 6 wickets. He scored his maiden Test century in his fourth match, played in June 1998 against New Zealand. The 150 he scored against Bangladesh in September 2001 is the fastest Test century made by a Sri Lankan player. However, this innings came to an unusual end when he retired out just after reaching 150 runs. (Note: When a batsman leaves the field due to a reason other than injury or illness, and does not resume his innings later, he is ruled "retired out". On this particular match, Sri Lankan captain Sanath Jayasuriya decided to recall Marvan Atapattu and Jayawardene after they had scored 201 and 150 respectively, which resulted in their dismissals. This was the first time a retired out had occurred in Test cricket, and Jayawardene was the second batsman to be dismissed in this manner following Atapattu. Although it was done to give the other batsmen a chance to bat, this incident attracted a considerable amount of criticism from Sri Lankan media, who claimed that it was a demeaning of Test cricket.) Jayawardene's best innings was made against South Africa in July 2006 when he scored 374 runs, surpassing Sanath Jayasuriya's record of 340 for the highest individual score by a Sri Lankan batsman. It is also the fourth-highest score in Test cricket, as well as part of the world's highest Test partnership—624 runs—which he established with teammate Kumar Sangakkara. Jayawardene has scored a total of 34 centuries during his career, the second highest number by a Sri Lankan player, after Kumar Sangakkara. He has scored more than 200 runs on seven of these occasions. This is the second-highest number of double centuries by a Sri Lankan player, behind Kumar Sangakkara. He is also one of only three players who have scored a triple century for Sri Lanka; the other two being Jayasuriya and Sangakkara.

Jayawardene made his ODI debut against Zimbabwe on 24 January 1998, and scored his first century a year later, against England on 23 January 1999. Although not as illustrious as his Test centuries, he has since made 19 ODI centuries for Sri Lanka. This is the fourth-highest number of centuries for Sri Lanka by a single player behind Jayasuriya's 28, Sangakkara's 21, and Dilshan's 20. On 10 June 2007, Jayawardene scored 107 runs for the Asia XI team, which he captained during the 2007 Afro-Asia Cup. Mahendra Singh Dhoni, who scored an unbeaten 139 in the same match, and Jayawardene are the only players who have scored a century for Asia XI. Jayawardene became the sixth player to score a century at a Cricket World Cup Final with an unbeaten 103 against India during the final match of the 2011 Cricket World Cup. (Note: Adam Gilchrist (2007), Ricky Ponting (2003), Aravinda de Silva (1996), Viv Richards (1979) and Clive Lloyd (1975) had previously scored centuries in a World Cup Final.) However, Sri Lanka lost the match, making Jayawardene the first centurion in a lost cause at a World Cup final.

Jayawardene made his T20I debut against England on 15 June 2006, and scored his first century against Zimbabwe on 3 May 2010. Jayawardene was the fourth player to score a century in a T20I, and the first Sri Lankan to do so.

== Key ==
- * – Remained not out
- ‡ – Captain in that match
- † – Man of the match
- (D/L) – Result was determined by the Duckworth–Lewis method

== Test cricket centuries ==
Test centuries scored by Jayawardene
| No. | Score | Against | Pos. | Inn. | Test | Venue | H/A/N | Date | Result | Ref |
|---|---|---|---|---|---|---|---|---|---|---|
| 1 | 167 † | New Zealand | 3 | 2 | 2/3 | Galle International Stadium, Galle | Home | 3 June 1998 | Won | |
| 2 | 242 † | India | 3 | 2 | 2/4 | Sinhalese Sports Club Ground, Colombo | Home | 24 February 1999 | Drawn | |
| 3 | 167 | South Africa | 4 | 1 | 1/3 | Galle International Stadium, Galle | Home | 20 July 2000 | Won | |
| 4 | 101* | South Africa | 4 | 4 | 3/3 | Sinhalese Sports Club Ground, Colombo | Home | 6 August 2000 | Drawn | |
| 5 | 101 | England | 5 | 1 | 2/3 | Asgiriya Stadium, Kandy | Home | 7 March 2001 | Lost | |
| 6 | 104 | India | 4 | 1 | 2/3 | Asgiriya Stadium, Kandy | Home | 22 August 2001 | Lost | |
| 7 | 139 | India | 4 | 2 | 3/3 | Sinhalese Sports Club Ground, Colombo | Home | 29 August 2001 | Won | |
| 8 | 150 | Bangladesh | 4 | 2 | 2/3 | Sinhalese Sports Club Ground, Colombo | Home | 6 September 2001 | Won | |
| 9 | 107 | England | 4 | 1 | 1/3 | Lord's Cricket Ground, London | Away | 16 May 2002 | Drawn | |
| 10 | 134 | England | 4 | 2 | 3/3 | Sinhalese Sports Club Ground, Colombo | Home | 18 December 2003 | Won | |
| 11 | 100* | Zimbabwe | 4 | 2 | 2/2 | Queens Sports Club, Bulawayo | Away | 14 May 2004 | Won | |
| 12 | 237 † | South Africa | 4 | 1 | 1/2 | Galle International Stadium, Galle | Home | 4 August 2004 | Drawn | |
| 13 | 141 | New Zealand | 4 | 2 | 1/2 | McLean Park, Napier | Away | 4 April 2005 | Drawn | |
| 14 | 119 † ‡ | England | 4 | 3 | 1/3 | Lord's Cricket Ground, London | Away | 11 May 2006 | Drawn | |
| 15 | 374 † ‡ | South Africa | 4 | 2 | 1/2 | Sinhalese Sports Club Ground, Colombo | Home | 27 July 2006 | Won | |
| 16 | 123 † ‡ | South Africa | 4 | 4 | 2/2 | Paikiasothy Saravanamuttu Stadium, Colombo | Home | 4 August 2006 | Won | |
| 17 | 127 ‡ | Bangladesh | 4 | 2 | 1/3 | Sinhalese Sports Club Ground, Colombo | Home | 25 June 2007 | Won | |
| 18 | 165 ‡ | Bangladesh | 4 | 3 | 3/3 | Asgiriya Stadium, Kandy | Home | 11 July 2007 | Won | |
| 19 | 104 ‡ | Australia | 4 | 2 | 2/2 | Bellerive Oval, Hobart | Away | 16 November 2007 | Lost | |
| 20 | 195 † ‡ | England | 4 | 2 | 2/3 | Sinhalese Sports Club Ground, Colombo | Home | 9 December 2007 | Drawn | |
| 21 | 213* † ‡ | England | 4 | 1 | 3/3 | Galle International Stadium, Galle | Home | 18 December 2007 | Drawn | |
| 22 | 136 ‡ | West Indies | 4 | 1 | 1/2 | Providence Stadium, Providence | Away | 22 March 2008 | Won | |
| 23 | 136 ‡ | India | 4 | 1 | 1/3 | Sinhalese Sports Club Ground, Colombo | Home | 23 July 2008 | Won | |
| 24 | 166 ‡ | Bangladesh | 4 | 3 | 1/2 | Sher-e-Bangla Cricket Stadium, Dhaka | Away | 26 December 2008 | Won | |
| 25 | 240 ‡ | Pakistan | 4 | 1 | 1/2 | National Stadium, Karachi | Away | 21 February 2009 | Drawn | |
| 26 | 114 | New Zealand | 4 | 1 | 1/2 | Galle International Stadium, Galle | Home | 18 August 2009 | Won | |
| 27 | 275 † | India | 4 | 2 | 1/3 | Sardar Patel Stadium, Ahmedabad | Away | 16 November 2009 | Drawn | |
| 28 | 174 | India | 4 | 1 | 2/3 | Sinhalese Sports Club Ground, Colombo | Home | 26 July 2010 | Drawn | |
| 29 | 105 | Australia | 4 | 4 | 1/3 | Galle International Stadium, Galle | Home | 31 August 2011 | Lost | |
| 30 | 180 ‡ | England | 4 | 2 | 1/2 | Galle International Stadium, Galle | Home | 26 March 2012 | Won | |
| 31 | 105 | England | 4 | 2 | 2/2 | P.Saravanamuttu Stadium, Colombo | Home | 3 April 2012 | Lost | |
| 32 | 129 † | Pakistan | 5 | 2 | 2/3 | Dubai International Cricket Stadium, Dubai | Away | 9 January 2014 | Won | |
| 33 | 203* † | Bangladesh | 4 | 2 | 1/2 | Sher-e-Bangla National Cricket Stadium, Dhaka | Away | 29 January 2014 | Won | |
| 34 | 165 | South Africa | 4 | 1 | 2/2 | Sinhalese Sports Club Ground, Colombo | Home | 24 July 2014 | Drawn | |

== ODI Centuries ==
ODI centuries scored by Jayawardene
| No. | Score | Against | Pos. | Inn. | S/R | Venue | H/A/N | Date | Result | Ref |
|---|---|---|---|---|---|---|---|---|---|---|
| 1 | 120 † | England | 5 | 2 | 108.10 | Adelaide Oval, Adelaide | Neutral | 23 January 1999 | Won | |
| 2 | 101 † | Pakistan | 3 | 1 | 73.18 | Indira Priyadarshini Stadium, Visakhapatnam | Neutral | 27 March 1999 | Won | |
| 3 | 128 | India | 4 | 1 | 104.06 | Sharjah Cricket Association Stadium, Sharjah | Neutral | 27 October 2000 | Won | |
| 4 | 101* † | England | 4 | 1 | 87.82 | R. Premadasa Stadium, Colombo | Home | 25 March 2001 | Won | |
| 5 | 116 † | New Zealand | 4 | 1 | 89.92 | Sharjah Cricket Association Stadium, Sharjah | Neutral | 10 April 2001 | Won | |
| 6 | 106* † | West Indies | 4 | 2 | 112.76 | Asgiriya Stadium, Kandy | Home | 15 December 2001 | Won | |
| 7 | 126* † ‡ | England | 3 | 2 | 99.21 | Riverside Ground, Chester-le-Street | Away | 24 June 2006 | Won | |
| 8 | 100 † ‡ | England | 3 | 1 | 120.48 | Old Trafford Cricket Ground, Manchester | Away | 28 June 2006 | Won | |
| 9 | 115* † ‡ | New Zealand | 4 | 1 | 105.50 | Sabina Park, Kingston | Neutral | 24 April 2007 | Won | |
| 10 | 107 (Note: This century was scored for Asian XI.) | Africa XI | 6 | 1 | 100.94 | M. A. Chidambaram Stadium, Chennai | Neutral | 10 June 2007 | Won | |
| 11 | 123 † | Pakistan | 2 | 2 | 113.88 | Rangiri Dambulla International Stadium, Dambulla | Home | 3 August 2009 | Won | |
| 12 | 108 | Bangladesh | 2 | 2 | 92.30 | Sher-e-Bangla Cricket Stadium, Dhaka | Away | 8 January 2010 | Won | |
| 13 | 100 | Canada | 4 | 1 | 123.45 | Mahinda Rajapaksha International Cricket Stadium, Hambantota | Home | 20 February 2011 | Won | |
| 14 | 103* | India | 4 | 1 | 117.04 | Wankhede Stadium, Mumbai | Away | 2 April 2011 | Lost | |
| 15 | 144 | England | 2 | 1 | 96.0 | Headingley, Leeds | Away | 1 July 2011 | Won | |
| 16 | 107 | India | 2 | 1 | 95.53 | Sabina Park, Kingston | Neutral | 2 July 2013 | Won | |
| 17 | 118 | India | 4 | 1 | 95.16 | Rajiv Gandhi International Cricket Stadium, Hyderabad | Away | 11 November 2014 | Lost | |
| 18 | 104 | New Zealand | 4 | 1 | 97.19 | Hagley Oval, Christchurch | Away | 11 January 2015 | Lost | |
| 19 | 100 † | Afghanistan | 5 | 2 | 83.33 | University Oval, Dunedin | Neutral | 22 February 2015 | Won | |

== T20I cricket centuries ==
T20I centuries scored by Jayawardene
| No. | Score | Against | Pos. | Inn. | S/R | Venue | H/A/N | Date | Result | Ref |
|---|---|---|---|---|---|---|---|---|---|---|
| 1 | 100 † | Zimbabwe | 1 | 1 | 156.25 | Providence Stadium, Providence | Neutral | 3 May 2010 | Won (D/L) | |
