= Lists of men =

This is an index of lists about men.

== Arts ==
- Hasty Pudding Man of the Year

== Fictional characters ==
- List of male detective characters

== Film and television ==
- List of male performers in gay porn films

== Politics ==
- List of first gentlemen in the United States

== Religion ==
- List of Jesuits

== Sports ==
=== Basketball ===
- All-NBA Team

=== Tennis ===
- Chronological list of men's Grand Slam tennis champions
- List of Australian Open men's singles champions
- List of Australian Open men's doubles champions
- List of French Open men's singles champions
- List of French Open men's doubles champions
- List of Grand Slam men's doubles champions
- List of Grand Slam men's singles champions
- List of male tennis players
- List of Open Era Grand Slam men's singles finals
- List of US Open men's singles champions
- List of US Open men's doubles champions

== Other ==
- List of Eagle Scouts
- List of male underwear models
- List of oldest fathers
- List of the verified oldest men
