= Lists of animation =

Animation is a method by which still figures are manipulated to appear as moving images. In traditional animation, images are drawn or painted by hand on transparent celluloid sheets to be photographed and exhibited on film. Today, many animations are made with computer-generated imagery. The following are lists of animation:

- Lists of anime
- Lists of animated films
- List of animated short films
- List of theatrical animated short film series
- Lists of animated television series
- List of animated internet series
- List of animated direct-to-video series
- List of years in animation
