= Lists of Egyptian hieroglyphs =

Lists of Egyptian hieroglyphs cover Egyptian hieroglyphs. They include:

- Gardiner's sign list, a list of common Egyptian hieroglyphs compiled by Sir Alan Gardiner and published in 1928–1929.
- List of Egyptian hieroglyphs, an updated list that extends Gardiner's lists
- Egyptian Hieroglyphs (Unicode block), the official computer encoding of the hieroglyphs
- Egyptian biliteral signs, hieroglyphs which represent a specific sequence of two consonants
- Egyptian triliteral signs, hieroglyphs which represent a specific sequence of three consonants
