= Lists of theme songs =

The following articles contain lists of theme songs:

- List of television theme music
- List of television theme music composers
- List of theme songs in Tales series

== See also ==
- Music in professional wrestling, including a list of professional wrestling theme songs
