= Lists of deaths =

The following are lists of notable deaths,

- Lists of deaths by year
- List of assassinations
- List of unsolved deaths
- List of murdered hip-hop musicians
- List of deaths in popular music
- List of deaths from drug overdose and intoxication
- List of deaths through alcohol
- Lists of people by cause of death
- Lists of unusual deaths
- Lists of murders
- Lists of poisonings
- Lists of victims of the September 11 attacks
