= Lists of patriarchs =

This is a directory of patriarchs across various Christian denominations.

== Lists ==
- List of current popes and patriarchs
- List of abunas of Eritrea
- List of abunas of Ethiopia
- List of Armenian patriarchs of Constantinople
- List of Armenian patriarchs of Jerusalem
- List of Armenian Catholic patriarchs of Cilicia
- List of bishops and patriarchs of Aquileia
- List of catholicoi of all Armenians
- List of patriarchs of the Church of the East
- List of Chaldean Catholic patriarchs of Baghdad
- List of Coptic Catholic patriarchs of Alexandria
- List of Coptic Orthodox popes
- List of Greek Orthodox patriarchs of Alexandria
- List of Greek Orthodox patriarchs of Antioch
- List of Greek Orthodox patriarchs of Jerusalem
- List of heads of the Serbian Orthodox Church
- List of Latin patriarchs of Jerusalem
- List of metropolitans and patriarchs of Kyiv
- List of Maronite patriarchs of Antioch
- List of Melkite Greek Catholic patriarchs of Antioch
- List of metropolitans and patriarchs of Moscow
- List of patriarchs of Alexandria
- List of patriarchs of Antioch
- List of patriarchs of the Bulgarian Orthodox Church
- List of patriarchs of the Church of the East
- List of ecumenical patriarchs of Constantinople
- List of patriarchs of the Czechoslovak Hussite Church
- List of Roman Catholic popes
- List of supreme governors of the Church of England
- List of Syriac Catholic patriarchs of Antioch
- List of Syriac Orthodox patriarchs of Antioch

== See also ==
- Lists of popes, patriarchs, primates, archbishops, and bishops
- Lists of office-holders
