= Lists of commandants of cadets of the United States =

The Commandant of Cadets is the officer in charge of the cadets at an academy. Lists include:

- List of commandants of cadets of the United States Air Force Academy
- List of commandants of cadets of the United States Military Academy
