= Gouled-Guelleh family =

Political and ruling family of Djibouti

Gouled-Guelleh family Guelleh family
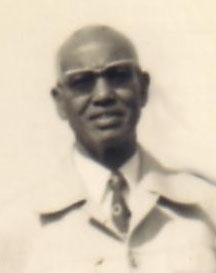
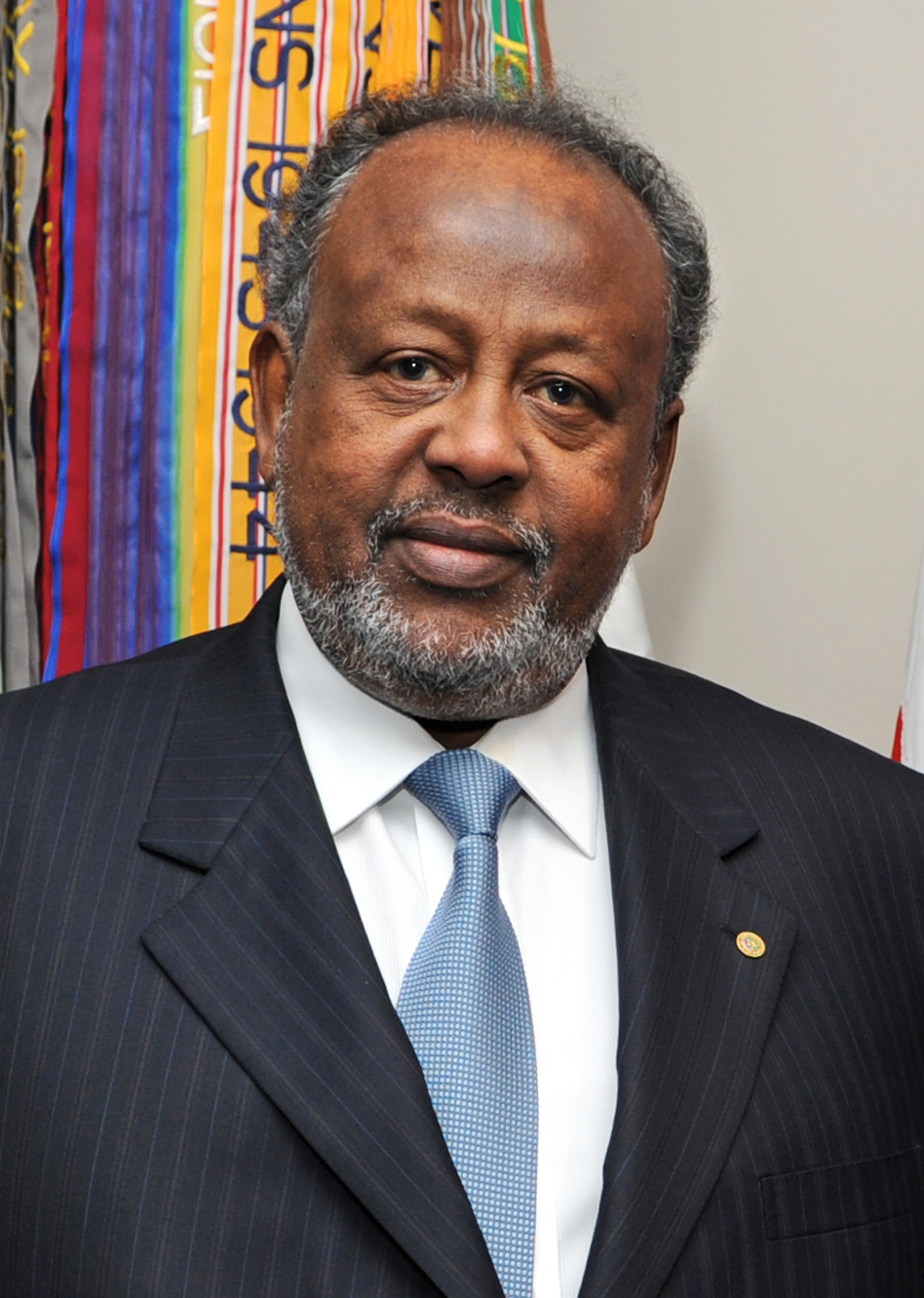
- Hassan Gouled Aptidon Ismaïl Omar Guelleh
- Parent family: Dir clan; Issa clan; Ēlēye' clan; Mamassan clan
- Country: Republic of Djibouti
- Current region: Horn of Africa
- Founded: Unknown
- Founder: Unknown
- Titles: Political titles: President of Djibouti; Prime Minister of Djibouti; De facto Vice President of Djibouti; First Lady of Djibouti; Minister of Health of Djibouti; President of the Government Council of French Territory of the Afars and the Issas; Vice President of the Government Council of French Somaliland
- Members: List: Guelleh Batal Omar Guelleh Ahmed Unnamed mother of Ismaïl Omar Guelleh Unnamed mother of Hassan Gouled Aptidon Hassan Gouled Aptidon Aïcha Bogoreh Darrar Unnamed second wife of Hassan Gouled Aptidon Hussein Idriss Gouled Habiba Idriss Gouled Ismaïl Omar Guelleh Warmog Ahmed Abar Kadra Mahamoud Haid Ridwan Ismaïl Saala Haïbado Ismaïl Omar Fatouma-Awo Ismaïl Omar Ainache Nasir Omar Ismaïl Saalah (1st line) Ahmad Shaheer Mappingé (2nd line) Saad Omar Guelleh Djama Ali Guelleh Djama Elmi Okieh Naguib Abdallah Kamil Nazli Abdallah Kamil One son in-law of Ismaïl Omar Guelleh from the Ivory Coast One son in-law of Ismaïl Omar Guelleh from Senegal
- Connected members: List: Mahamed Abdallah Kamil Omar Farah Iltireh Ahmed Omar Farah

The Gouled-Guelleh family or also called Guelleh family is a political family from the Republic of Djibouti, which is the ruling family of Djibouti since its independence on 27 June 1977.

== History ==
=== Background ===
The Gouled-Guelleh family members are part of the Mamassan clan of the Ēlēye' clan of the Issa clan of the Dir clan.

=== Before political activities ===
Not very much is known about the family before they became politically active. The only ancestor of Hassan Gouled Aptidon who is known is his mother, who, however, is unnamed. In the case of Ismaïl Omar Guelleh ancestors, there is more information, the grandfather of him, Guelleh Batal, worked for the Franco-Ethiopian Railway Company (CFE); his son, Omar Guelleh Ahmed, became one of the first native teachers in the 1930s before following his father's path. Omar Guelleh Ahmed married an unnamed woman.

=== Political activities ===
==== Pre-family rule ====
Hassan Gouled Aptidon, who was born on 15 October 1916, was the first known member of the family who became politically active. His political journey began in 1946 when he founded, with Mahamoud Harbi Farah, the Somali and Dankali Youth Club. Twelve years later, he took office as Vice President of the Government Council of French Somaliland on 8 December 1958, a position which he held until 12 April 1959. In the early 1960s, the Democratic Union Issa was founded, a political party which he led for a time; in 1965, he became a member of the Party of the Popular Movement and was jailed with other PMP officials in 1967. He later had a membership in the African People's League for Independence, a political party founded in February 1975. On 18 May 1977, he took the position of President of the Government Council of French Territory of the Afars and the Issas and was elected on 28 May 1977 as President of the future Republic of Djibouti, both offices which he held until 27 June 1977. On 27 June 1977, Djibouti became independent and has since then been officially called the Republic of Djibouti after the majority of people voted for independence in the 1977 Afars and Issas independence referendum.

==== Gouled reign (1977–1999) ====
Hassan Gouled Aptidon became the first President of Djibouti and Prime Minister of Djibouti on 27 June 1977, the same day Djibouti gained independence from France. On 12 July 1977 Ahmed Dini Ahmed replaced Gouled as prime mminister. Gouled's wife Aïcha Bogoreh Darrar, became the First Lady of Djibouti and also was the Head of the National Union of Djiboutian Women (UNFD) from 1977 until 1979. Gouled's nephew Ismaïl Omar Guelleh, who was born on 27 November 1947, became Head of the Secret Police, Chief of Staff and Chief of the Cabinet in the Government. On 4 March 1979 the People's Rally for Progress was established, to replace the LPAI, Guelleh was elected into the Central Committee in 1983 and subsequently became the director of a cultural commission in Paris and in 1987, became a member of the party leadership. Guelleh came to handle affairs for the elderly Hassan Gouled; Guelleh was already intended to become his uncle's successor. On 4 February 1999, Gouled Aptidon, announced his retirement at the time of the next election, and an extraordinary congress of his party, the ruling RPP, chose Guelleh as its presidential candidate, handpicked by Aptidon. On 9 April 1999, the date of the presidential election, Guelleh was elected as president with 74% of the vote. Guelleh replaced Gouled as president on 8 May 1999. During the rule of Hassan Gouled Aptidon, Ismaïl Omar Guelleh's first cousin Djama Ali Guelleh was appointed as the Director General of Electricité de Djibouti (EDD) in 1986, an office he still holds.

==== Guelleh reign (1999–present) ====
With Ismaïl Omar Guelleh as new president, Kadra Mahamoud Haid became the new first lady of the country, Haid is seen since 2015 also as "De facto Vice President of Djibouti", reportedly due Guelleh who only shares power with her. Haïbado Ismaïl Omar the daughter of Haid and Guelleh, is an adviser to her father, Guelleh's son-in-law, Djama Elmi Okieh, is the Minister of Health and Gulleh's half-brother, Saad Omar Guelleh is the General Manager of the Port of Djibouti.

During the first eight years of Guelleh's rule his aunt Aïcha Bogoreh Darrar died on 5 August 2001 and his uncle Hassan Gouled Aptidon died on 21 November 2006.

== Members ==
- Guelleh Batal (?), grandfather of Ismaïl
- Omar Guelleh Ahmed (?), father of Ismaïl
- Unnamed mother of Ismaïl Omar Guelleh (?)
- Unnamed mother of Hassan Gouled Aptidon (?)
- Hassan Gouled Aptidon (1916–2006), first President of Djibouti and Prime Minister of Djibouti
- Aïcha Bogoreh Darrar (1928–2001), first First Lady of Djibouti
- Unnamed second wife of Hassan Gouled Aptidon
- Hussein Idriss Gouled (?),
- Habiba Idriss Gouled (?)
- Ismaïl Omar Guelleh (born 1947), second President of Djibouti
- Warmog Ahmed Abar (?)
- Kadra Mahamoud Haid (born ?), second First Lady of Djibouti and De facto Vice President of Djibouti
- Ridwan Ismaïl Saala (?)
- Haïbado Ismaïl Omar (born ?), Adviser to the President
- Fatouma-Awo Ismaïl Omar (born ?), Businessewoman
- Ainache (?)
- Nasir Omar Ismaïl Saalah (1st line) (?)
- Ahmad Shaheer Mappingé (2nd line) (?)
- Saad Omar Guelleh (born ?), General Manager of the Port of Djibouti
- Djama Ali Guelleh (born ?), Director General of Electricité de Djibouti
- Djama Elmi Okieh (born ?), Minister of Health
- Naguib Abdallah Kamil (?)
- Nazli Abdallah Kamil (?), Businessewoman
- One son in-law of Ismaïl Omar Guelleh from the Ivory Coast (?)
- One son in-law of Ismaïl Omar Guelleh from Senegal (?)

=== Connected members ===
- Mahamed Abdallah Kamil (?)
- Omar Farah Iltireh (1933–2008), Ambassador of Djibouti in France
- Ahmed Omar Farah (?)

== See also ==
- Bongo family
