= Human rights in Djibouti =

The issue of human rights in Djibouti, a small country situated within the Horn of Africa, is a matter of concern for several human rights organizations.

The US State Department Country Report on Human Rights Practices for 2019 points out that Djibouti's significant human rights issues included: unlawful or arbitrary killings by government agents; arbitrary detention by government agents; harsh and life-threatening prison conditions; arbitrary or unlawful interference with privacy; unjustified arrests or prosecutions of journalists; criminal libel; substantial interference with the rights of peaceful assembly and freedom of association; significant acts of corruption; and violence against women and girls with inadequate government action for prosecution and accountability, including female genital mutilation/cutting. It states also that impunity was a problem, with the government seldom taking steps to identify and punish officials who committed abuses, whether in the security services or elsewhere in the government.

== History (1977–2006) and political situation ==
Djibouti gained independence from France in 1977, after a 98.8% of the electorate voted in favour of disengagement in a referendum. Hassan Gouled Aptidon became president and his political party, the People's Rally for Progress, was declared the sole legal party in 1981. It has remained in control ever since, under Aptidon until 1999, and Ismaïl Omar Guelleh thereafter.

The following is a chart of Djibouti's ratings since 1977 in the Freedom in the World reports, published annually by Freedom House. A rating of 1 is "free"; 7, "not free".^{1}

Historical ratings

Year	Political Rights	Civil Liberties	Status	President^{2}
1977	3	4	Partly Free	Hassan Gouled Aptidon
1978	3	4	Partly Free	Hassan Gouled Aptidon
1979	3	4	Partly Free	Hassan Gouled Aptidon
1980	3	4	Partly Free	Hassan Gouled Aptidon
1981	5	6	Not Free	Hassan Gouled Aptidon
1982^{3}	5	6	Not Free	Hassan Gouled Aptidon
1983	5	6	Not Free	Hassan Gouled Aptidon
1984	5	6	Partly Free	Hassan Gouled Aptidon
1985	6	6	Not Free	Hassan Gouled Aptidon
1986	6	6	Not Free	Hassan Gouled Aptidon
1987	6	6	Not Free	Hassan Gouled Aptidon
1988	6	6	Not Free	Hassan Gouled Aptidon
1989	6	5	Not Free	Hassan Gouled Aptidon
1990	6	5	Not Free	Hassan Gouled Aptidon
1991	6	5	Not Free	Hassan Gouled Aptidon
1992	6	6	Not Free	Hassan Gouled Aptidon
1993	6	6	Not Free	Hassan Gouled Aptidon
1994	6	6	Not Free	Hassan Gouled Aptidon
1995	5	6	Not Free	Hassan Gouled Aptidon
1996	5	6	Not Free	Hassan Gouled Aptidon
1997	5	6	Not Free	Hassan Gouled Aptidon
1998	5	6	Not Free	Hassan Gouled Aptidon
1999	4	6	Partly Free	Hassan Gouled Aptidon
2000	4	5	Partly Free	Ismaïl Omar Guelleh
2001	4	5	Partly Free	Ismaïl Omar Guelleh
2002	4	5	Partly Free	Ismaïl Omar Guelleh
2003	5	5	Partly Free	Ismaïl Omar Guelleh
2004	5	5	Partly Free	Ismaïl Omar Guelleh
2005	5	5	Partly Free	Ismaïl Omar Guelleh
2006	5	5	Partly Free	Ismaïl Omar Guelleh
2007	5	5	Partly Free	Ismaïl Omar Guelleh
2008	5	5	Partly Free	Ismaïl Omar Guelleh
2009	5	5	Partly Free	Ismaïl Omar Guelleh
2010	6	5	Not Free	Ismaïl Omar Guelleh
2011	6	5	Not Free	Ismaïl Omar Guelleh
2012	6	5	Not Free	Ismaïl Omar Guelleh
2013	6	5	Not Free	Ismaïl Omar Guelleh
2014	6	5	Not Free	Ismaïl Omar Guelleh
2015	6	5	Not Free	Ismaïl Omar Guelleh
2016	6	5	Not Free	Ismaïl Omar Guelleh
2017	6	5	Not Free	Ismaïl Omar Guelleh
2018	6	5	Not Free	Ismaïl Omar Guelleh
2019	7	5	Not Free	Ismaïl Omar Guelleh
2020	7	5	Not Free	Ismaïl Omar Guelleh
2021	7	5	Not Free	Ismaïl Omar Guelleh
2022	7	5	Not Free	Ismaïl Omar Guelleh
2023	7	5	Not Free	Ismaïl Omar Guelleh

=== Aptidon regime (1977–1999) ===
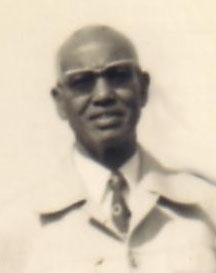
Hassan Gouled Aptidon

Claims of political detentions and torture began almost immediately after independence. On 15 December 1977, seventeen supporters of the opposition Mouvement populaire de libération were arrested and tortured. In 1978, fifteen students, visiting from their studies abroad in Paris, were sentenced to months in jail and reportedly tortured for articles written by their student union in France. After an armed attack in 1979 in Randa, sixty Afars were detained and at least one died as a result of torture. It was claimed that many were arrested solely for their membership of the Mouvement populaire de libération. After a supposed assassination attempt on the Director of Security in June 1979 (the reality of which Amnesty International reported to be in doubt), nine political opponents, including two parliamentary deputies, were detained and tortured. One of these – Mohamed Houmed Mohamed – had previously delivered a parliamentary speech denouncing the government's use of torture.

In August 1981 the Parti populaire Djiboutien sought legal recognition as a political party. In early September they released their first bulletin, and on 7 September all thirteen members of the Executive Committee were arrested, including six members of parliament. Included in the detainees was Mohamed Houmed Mohamed. Some of these members fled the country after release, but were again detained and tortured upon their return from exile.

Reported torture methods under Aptidon include (but are not limited to): severe beatings; waterboarding; burnings; tearing out of fingernails; electric shocks; prolonged exposure to smoke resulting in near-asphyxiation; "The Swing", in which the naked victim was suspended from a bar by his ankles; and insertions of bottles into the anus.

=== Guellah regime (1999–) ===
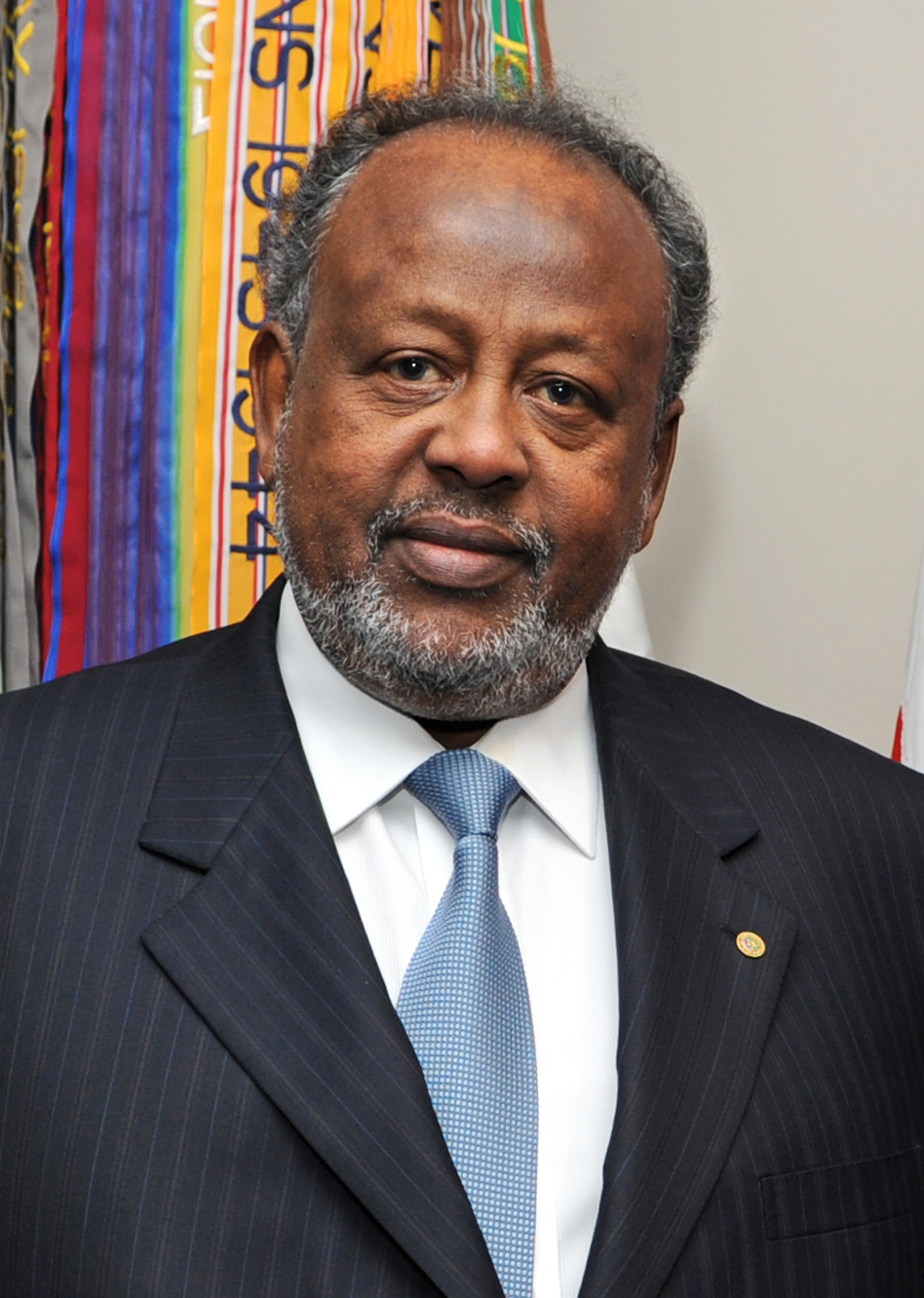
Ismaïl Omar Guelleh

Aptidon announced his retirement in February 1999 and the People's Rally for Progress chose Ismaïl Omar Guelleh as their presidential candidate. He handily won the April elections, with almost three quarters of the vote, defeating his only presidential rival, the independent Moussa Ahmed Idriss. Idriss was arrested the following September for "threatening the morale of the armed forces" and detained at an undisclosed location.

The People's Rally for Progress has continued to dominate politics under Guellah, taking advantage of a unique first-past-the-post system in which the majority winner in each of the country's five electoral districts carries all the seats. Thus, in the 2003 National Assembly elections, the coalition took all 65 seats with only 62% of the vote. Opposition parties boycotted both the 2005 and 2008 elections.

In 2008, President Guellah issued a decree dissolving the opposition Movement for Democratic Renewal and Development party.

In April 2010, the constitution was amended, lifting the two-term limit and allowing Guelleh to continue his tenure as president. In June 2010, Djibouti's richest citizen and former friend of the president, Abdourahman Boreh, was convicted in absentia for terrorism. He lacked a defence lawyer and had been intending a presidential run for 2011.

== Current issues (2007–) ==
=== Freedom of speech ===
Both the main newspaper (La Nation de Djibouti) and broadcaster (Radiodiffusion Télévision de Djibouti) are controlled by the government. The opposition newspaper Le Renouveau ceased operations in 2007 after publishing an article claiming a businessman bribed Ismail Omar Guelleh's brother-in-law, the governor of the Central Bank of Djibouti. On 2 July 2009, Ahmed Darar Robleh was arrested and later sentenced to six months in prison for writing poetry criticising the president.

In February 2011 the government arrested dozens of political opponents, including six people who provide reporting to the European radio station, La Voix de Djibouti. These included Farah Abadid Heldid and Houssein Robleh Dabar, who were released four months later but again arrested in November.

=== Freedom of religion ===
Freedom House claims that freedom of worship is respected in the country.

=== Legal system ===
Djibouti abolished the death penalty in April 2010. The nation's legal system is based on the French civil code, with Shariah law handling family matters.

==== Arbitrary arrests ====
Though arbitrary arrests are prohibited by law, third party organizations claim that this right is not respected.

Security forces frequently make illegal arrests. Jean-Paul Noel Abdi, president of the Djiboutian League of Human Rights, was arrested on 9 February 2011 after reporting on opposition protests in connection with the Arab Spring earlier that month. According to Human Rights Watch, he did not support the protests themselves but objected to what he described as arbitrary arrests. He was later released on health grounds but the charges remain.

=== Torture ===
Torture is banned by the constitution. However, reports of its use continue to flow to the outside world. Prostitutes are arrested by vice squads, and rape is reportedly a precondition of release. There are occasional reports of police beating prisoners. Reporters Without Borders claims that Dirir Ibrahim Bouraleh died from injuries sustained under torture by Sergeant Major Abdourahman Omar Said from 23 – 27 April 2011.

=== Prison conditions ===
Djibouti has one central prison – Gabode in Djibouti City – and a number of small jails. Conditions in the system are reported to be "harsh". While often overcrowded, prisoners in Gabode are fed three meals a day and have access to medical care. Conditions in the jails are considered worse, with no formal system of care. Human rights training is provided to guards by the government.

=== Minority and women's rights ===
According to Freedom House, minority groups such as Yemenis and Afars face marginalization.

Female genital mutilation is common. Equality, however, has been making strides; over 50% of judges are now women.

== International treaties ==
Djibouti's stances on international human rights treaties are as follows:

International treaties

Treaty	Organization	Introduced	Signed	Ratified
Convention on the Prevention and Punishment of the Crime of Genocide	United Nations	1948	-	-
International Convention on the Elimination of All Forms of Racial Discrimination	United Nations	1966	2006	2009
International Covenant on Economic, Social and Cultural Rights	United Nations	1966	-	2002
International Covenant on Civil and Political Rights	United Nations	1966	-	2002
First Optional Protocol to the International Covenant on Civil and Political Rights	United Nations	1966	-	2002
Convention on the Non-Applicability of Statutory Limitations to War Crimes and Crimes Against Humanity	United Nations	1968	-	-
International Convention on the Suppression and Punishment of the Crime of Apartheid	United Nations	1973	-	-
Convention on the Elimination of All Forms of Discrimination against Women	United Nations	1979	-	1998
Convention against Torture and Other Cruel, Inhuman or Degrading Treatment or Punishment	United Nations	1984	-	2002
Convention on the Rights of the Child	United Nations	1989	1990	1990
Second Optional Protocol to the International Covenant on Civil and Political Rights, aiming at the abolition of the death penalty	United Nations	1989	-	2002
International Convention on the Protection of the Rights of All Migrant Workers and Members of Their Families	United Nations	1990	-	-
Optional Protocol to the Convention on the Elimination of All Forms of Discrimination against Women	United Nations	1999	-	-
Optional Protocol to the Convention on the Rights of the Child on the Involvement of Children in Armed Conflict	United Nations	2000	2006	2011
Optional Protocol to the Convention on the Rights of the Child on the Sale of Children, Child Prostitution and Child Pornography	United Nations	2000	2006	2011
Convention on the Rights of Persons with Disabilities	United Nations	2006	-	2012
Optional Protocol to the Convention on the Rights of Persons with Disabilities	United Nations	2006	-	2012
International Convention for the Protection of All Persons from Enforced Disappearance	United Nations	2006	-	-
Optional Protocol to the International Covenant on Economic, Social and Cultural Rights	United Nations	2008	-	-
Optional Protocol to the Convention on the Rights of the Child on a Communications Procedure	United Nations	2011	-	-

== See also ==
- Human trafficking in Djibouti

== Notes ==
1.Note that the "Year" signifies the "Year covered". Therefore the information for the year marked 2008 is from the report published in 2009, and so on.
2.As of 27 June (Independence Day) in 1977; 1 January thereafter.
3.The 1982 report covers the year 1981 and the first half of 1982, and the following 1984 report covers the second half of 1982 and the whole of 1983. In the interest of simplicity, these two aberrant "year and a half" reports have been split into three year-long reports through interpolation.
