= 1967 French legislative election in French Somaliland =

Elections to the French National Assembly were held in French Somaliland on 23 April 1967 as part of the wider French parliamentary elections. Moussa Ali Abdoulkader was elected as the territory's MP.

== Results ==
Candidate	Votes	%
Moussa Ali Abdoulkader	22,776	66.26
Idriss Farah Abaneh	11,052	32.15
Four other candidates	548	1.59
Total	34,376	100.00
Valid votes	34,376	99.36
Invalid/blank votes	220	0.64
Total votes	34,596	100.00
Registered voters/turnout	39,989	86.51
Source: Sternberger et al
