= Pierre Nouailhetas =

- Born: December 17, 1894; Cercoux, Charente-Maritime department, France
- Died: 1985
- Occupations: French Navy officer Colonial administrator
- Years active: 1913–1942
- Known for: Governor of French Somaliland

Pierre-Marie-Élie-Louis Nouailhetas (17 December 1894 – 1985) was a French naval officer who served as the governor of French Somaliland from 7 August 1940 until 21 October 1942 during World War II.

== Life ==
=== Before Somaliland ===
Nouailhetas was born at Cercoux on 17 December 1894, the second son and child of Louis Nouailhetas, an engineer officer in the navy, and Marie-Anne-Françoise Bertet. He entered the École Navale in 1913. He received two citations during World War I (1914–18). In 1925, he left the navy to join the colonial service. His first posting was as an adjutant (adjoint) at Lạng Sơn. In 1927, he was promoted the rank of administrator (administrateur) in charge of Tuyên Quang Province. He later served as chief of staff (chef de cabinet) to the governor of Cochinchina and then administrator of Bến Tre Province and Cần Thơ Province (1933–36). Between 1936 and 1939 he was the secretary-general (secrétaire général) to the Governor General of Indochina.

=== Governor of Somaliland ===
In August 1940, following the fall of France, he was named by the Vichy government to replace Gaëtan Germain as governor of French Somaliland. He flew into the colony, already threatened with a British interdict, on 2 September. On 18 September the British established a blockade and on 25 September they bombed the capital, Djibouti, from the air. This resulted in Nouailhetas instituting a brutal reign of terror. Europeans suspected of contact with the enemy were interned at Obock, while 45 others were condemned to death or forced labour, mostly in absentia. On 7 May 1941, Nouailhetas issued circular letter No. 457, which ordered any native caught carrying a message from Allied forces to be shot by a firing squad. That month, six illiterate Somalis were shot without trial as "Gaullist traitors" to set an example.

On 8 June 1941, the British gave Nouailhetas an ultimatum: they would lift the blockade and provide one month's worth of provisions if the colony declared for De Gaulle; otherwise the blockade would be tightened. Nouailhetas wrote to British authorities in Aden on 15 June about the high rate of infant mortality owing to malnutrition in the territory, but he rejected their terms. When negotiations resumed with Nouailhetas later in the summer, the British offered to evacuate the garrison and European civilians to another French colony upon surrender. Nouailhetas responde that he would destroy the colony's railroads and port facilities before surrendering. All these negotiations came to nothing.

=== Retirement ===
In September 1942, on account of reports of his brutality and intractability, Nouailhetas was recalled to Vichy and forced to retire without a pension. Following the war, he escaped to Portugal. During the post-war Épuration, he was sentenced to death in absentia. He returned to face a military tribunal and was acquitted on 17 July 1953, which sparked outrage in Djibouti. He died in obscurity in 1985.

== Bibliography ==
- "Louis Nouailhetas" (PDF). Les entreprises coloniales françaises. 2014.
- Alwan, Daoud Aboubaker; Mibrathu, Yohanis (2000). Historical Dictionary of Djibouti. Scarecrow Press.
- Cornevin, Robert, ed. (1988). "Louis Nouailhetas". Hommes et destins: dictionnaire biographique d'outre-mer, Volume 8, Gouverneurs, administrateurs, magistrats. Académie des sciences d'outre-mer. p. 320.
- Thompson, Virginia McLean; Adloff, Richard (1968). Djibouti and the Horn of Africa. Stanford University Press.
