= Radio Television of Djibouti =

National broadcaster of Djibouti

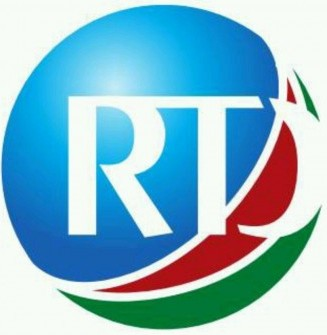
- Country: Djibouti
- Broadcast area: National
- Headquarters: Djibouti City, Djibouti

Programming
- Languages: Somali, Afar, Arabic, French
- Picture format: 4:3 (576i, SDTV)

Ownership
- Owner: Government of Djibouti

History
- Launched: 1966

Links
- Website: www.rtd.dj

Radio Television of Djibouti (RTD) (Arabic: إذاعة وتلفزيون جيبوتي, French: Radiodiffusion télévision de Djibouti) is the national broadcaster of Djibouti. The station is based in Djibouti city and the only media outlet of the country. RTD broadcasts in Arabic, French, Afar, Somali & English The in-house band of RTD is Groupe RTD.

In addition to RTD, the country's government does not allow any other broadcasters. According to Reporters Without Borders, RTD is used for government propaganda. The opposition broadcaster La Voix de Djibouti broadcast for ten years as an online radio from Belgium, in June 2020 it resumed terrestrial broadcasting on a rented station from Bulgaria via shortwave.

RTD operates a powerful medium wave transmitter that broadcasts the Arabic-language US-governmental program Radio Sawa for all of East Africa.

== History ==
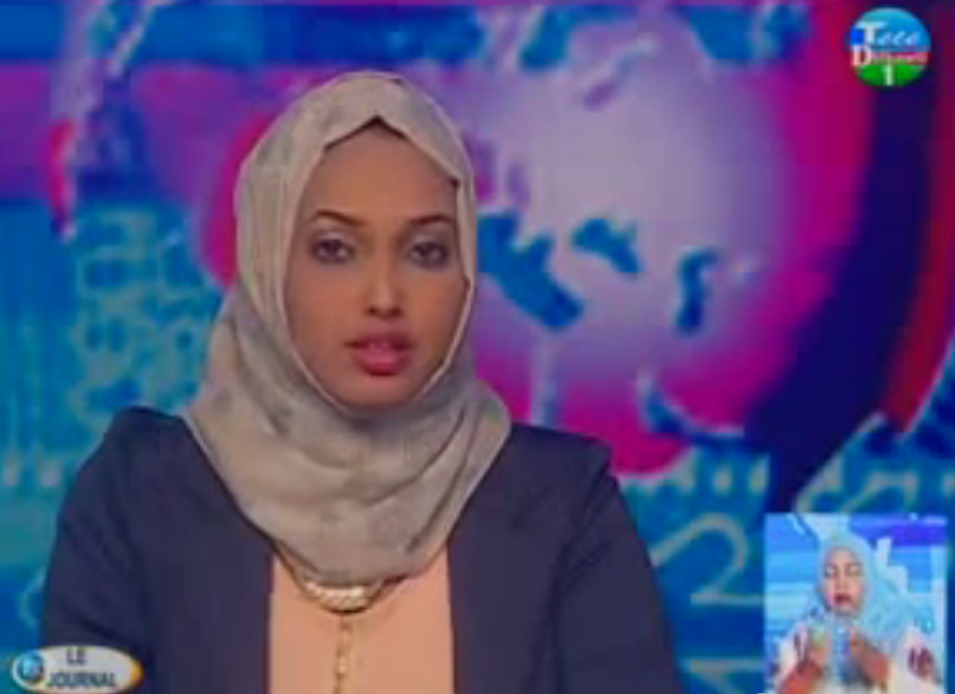
A news broadcast in French on Radio Television of Djibouti.

An initial "Radio Djibouti" began broadcasting from the Vichy-loyal colony of the French Somaliland on August 18, 1941, on the 17.36-meter shortwave band; its primary aim was to protest against the British naval blockade. In April 1967, Office de Radiodiffusion Télévision Française (ORTF) set up a regional overseas television station in Djibouti City, broadcasting on a 50Kw transmitter on channel 5. This station, without any production infrastructure, was designed for the rebroadcast of programs from French radio and television channels, produced in France. A small percentage of its television programming was in French and supplied from the mainland, with the rest in the three local languages; for radio, French was the dominant language. The first color broadcast in Djibouti began in 1974, and full-color broadcasting wasn't available until 1977.

In 1977, upon its independence, the Republic of Djibouti focused on this sector to strengthen national unity and help the development of the country. The staff was poorly trained and the equipment rather outdated. It was in 1983, with the help of West German cooperation, that a broadcasting transmission center was set up in Doraleh, near city of Djibouti. This center had the capacity to broadcast radio on medium wave (1,539 kHz with 20 kW), short wave (4,780 kHz with 20 kW) and frequency modulation throughout the country, and produce radio broadcasts.

In 1986, a television broadcasting network in the main towns of the interior regions was installed. With these improvements made to the RTD, the studios and equipment became insufficient for the production of programs, it only produced 20% of the programs broadcast. To remedy this situation, the Japanese government financed a project to extend a production center with high-performance equipment. Alongside this policy of increasing resources, a strengthening of human resources was undertaken. Between 1985 and 1990, the number of television stations increased, in percentage, from 16.7% to 21%. Radio Television of Djibouti is a general news and entertainment channel.

The broadcasting schedule is composed of news, cultural programs, series, entertainment and variety. Through Badr-4 satellite, the station's transmission can be received in North Africa, Europe, the Near and Middle East. Some of its programs are also streamed on the internet.
