= French Somaliland in World War II =

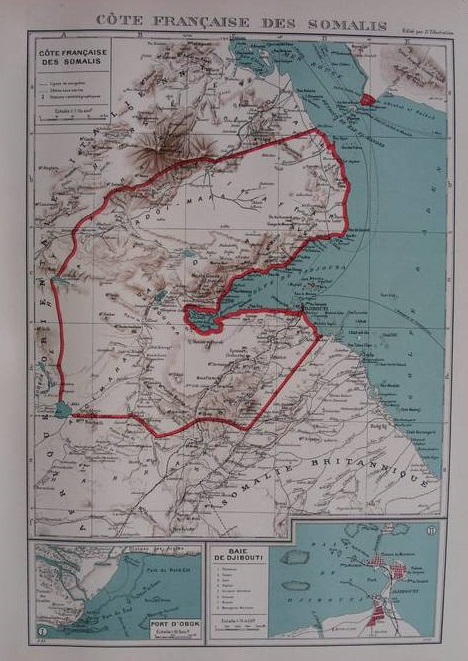
A map of French Somaliland

French Somaliland was the scene of only minor skirmishes during World War II, mostly between June and July 1940. After the battle of France and the armistice of 22 June 1940, the colony's status was briefly in limbo until a governor loyal to the client Vichy regime was installed on 25 July. It was the last French colony in Africa to remain loyal to the Vichy regime, only surrendering to Free French forces on 26 December 1942.

French Navy officer Pierre Nouailhetas governed the colony for most of the period it was loyal to the Vichy regime. After a British aerial bombardment against the colony in 1940, Nouailhetas instituted a brutal reign of terror in French Somaliland, targeting both European and African residents perceived as collaborating with the Allies; he was eventually recalled and forced to retire as a result of his action.

From September 1940, the colony was under an Allied blockade, with many of its inhabitants fleeing to the neighbouring colony of British Somaliland. After the colony's liberation by Free French forces, numerous officials were appointed as its governors and French Somaliland was only starting to recover from the blockade when the war ended in 1945.

== Background ==
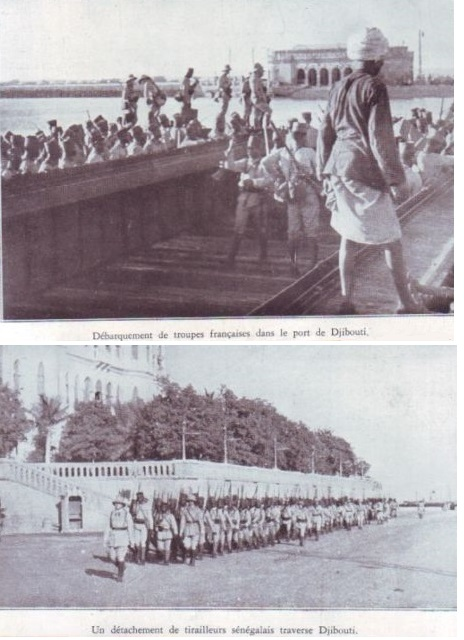
Landing of French troops in Djibouti in 1935

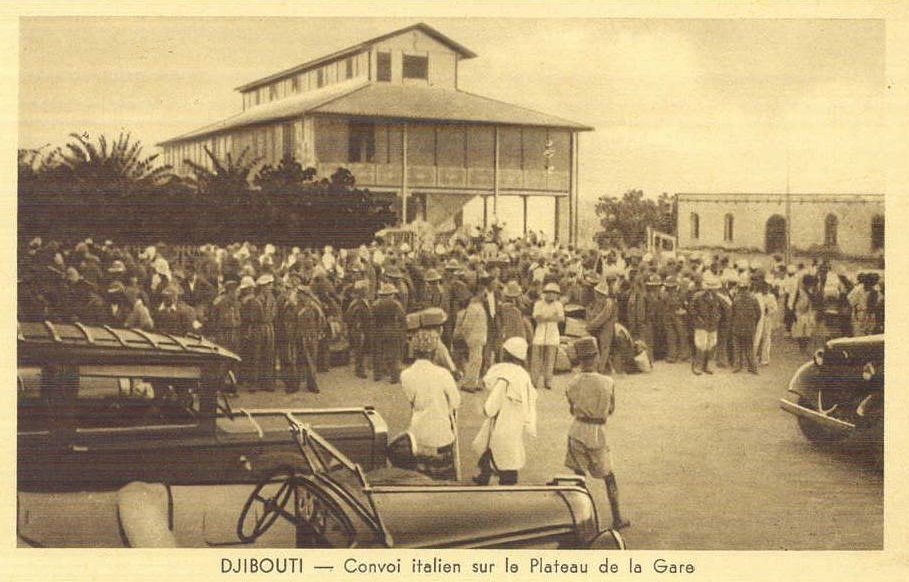
Italian supply convoy in Djibouti, c. 1936–38

In 1934–35, Italo-Ethiopian tensions were affecting the Horn of Africa while in Europe German re-armament weighed on the French government. Looking for Italian support against Germany in the event of war, France ceded several territories, including a small piece of territory in northern Somaliland to Italian Eritrea, in the Mussolini–Laval Accord of 7 January 1935. This treaty was never ratified by Italy and although preparations were made to transfer the territory, it was not actually transferred prior to the outbreak of war in 1940.

In 1935, Italy invaded Ethiopia and the French government paid increased attention to the defence of French Somaliland. In January 1938 an Italian force moved down onto the plain of Hanlé (Note: Hanlé is a wadi (French oued) in the south of the Danakil Desert, in northern Djibouti) in French territory and encamped there. Italy claimed that this territory lay on the Ethiopian side of the border, as per the Franco-Ethiopian treaty of 1897. The French colonial minister, Georges Mandel, and the commander-in-chief at Djibouti, Paul Legentilhomme, responded by strengthening the colony's defences to unprecedented levels: 15,000 troops were stationed there and posts were established at Afambo, Moussa Ali and even on the other side of the Italians. (Note: Mockler puts the number at 5,000.) The landward fortifications were augmented extensively with concrete.

In October 1938, in the aftermath of the Munich Agreement, Italy demanded concessions from France, among them a free port at Djibouti and control of the Djibouti–Addis Ababa railway. The French refused the demands, believing the true Italian intention was outright acquisition of the colony. On 30 November, after anti-French protests in Rome, the Italian foreign minister, Galeazzo Ciano, demanded the cession of French Somaliland to Italy. Speaking in the Chamber of Deputies on the "natural aspirations of the Italian people", he inspired shouts of "Nice! Corsica! Savoy! Tunisia! Djibouti! Malta!"

On 18 December 1938, there was a counter-demonstration in Djibouti in the course of which a huge crowd gathered in the centre of town waving the French flag and shouting pro-French slogans. Meanwhile, the Italians built a string of small posts (Abba, Dagguirou, Gouma, etc.) inside the western border of French Somaliland, claiming in late 1939 that the territory had always been part of Ethiopia. In April 1940, they claimed that the French had built a post at Afambo in undisputedly Italian territory, although there is no record that there had been a post there before the Italians built one in October 1940.

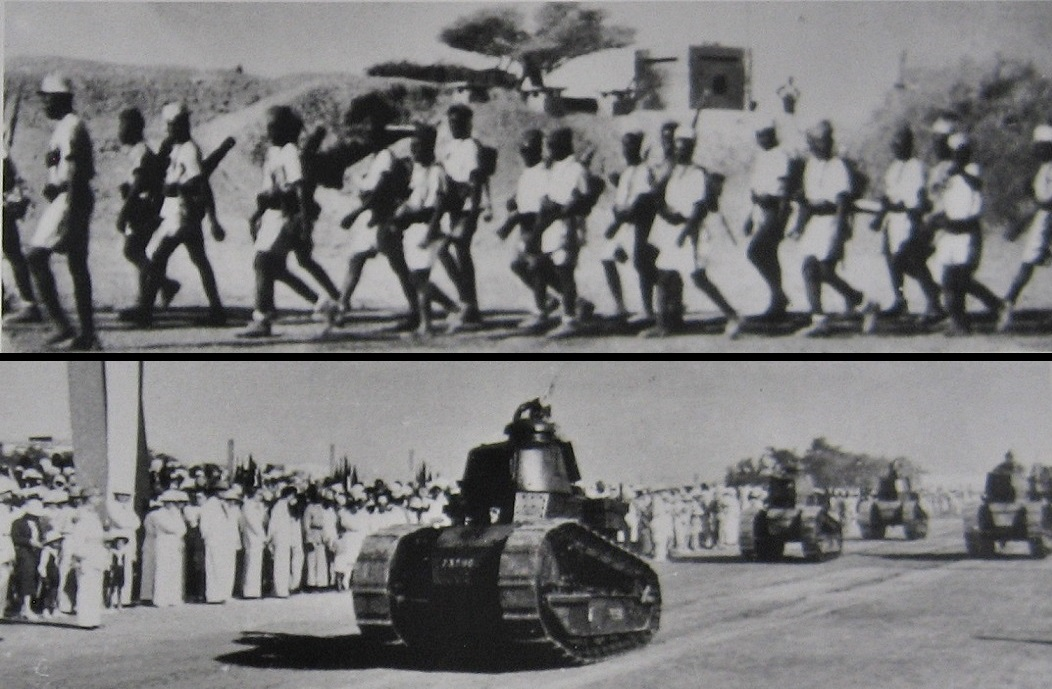
French military build-up in 1938–39

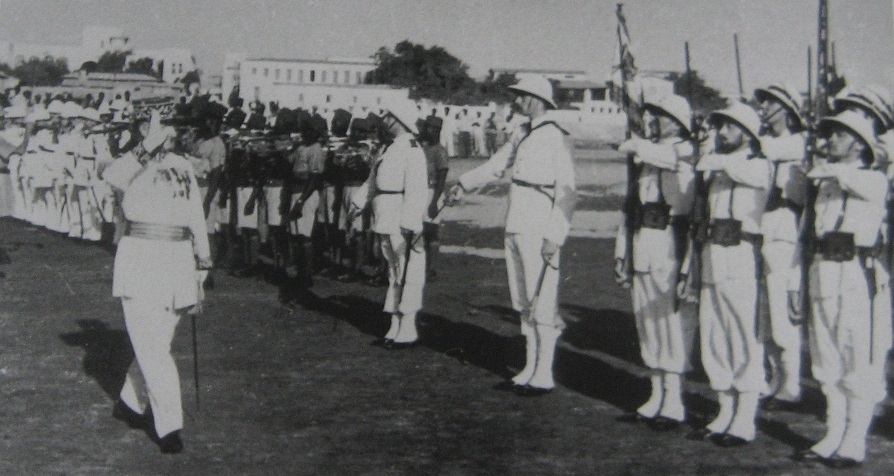
Legentilhomme reviewing troops, c. 1939

In January 1940, the Italian viceroy and commander-in-chief in East Africa, Prince Amedeo, Duke of Aosta, submitted a proposal to Rome for a "surprise" invasion of French Somaliland involving sixteen motorised battalions and a force of 6,000 Azebo Galla and 6,000 Danakil tribesmen already near the frontier. The plan was soon leaked and in response General Guglielmo Nasi was replaced as governor of Harar by a civilian, Enrico Cerulli. The "Danakil horde" continued to monitor the frontier.

On the eve of World War II, Fauque de Jonquières, a battalion commander, was in charge of the local intelligence outfit, itself an arm of the Section d'Études Militaires (SEM), the Deuxième Bureau station in Marseille. After the Italian conquest of Ethiopia he gave money, arms, advisors, propaganda and refuge to the Ethiopian resistance. One French reserve officer, P. R. Monnier, was killed on a secret mission in Ethiopia in November 1939. Despite the fact that British Somaliland bordered French Somiland and both were surrounded by Italian East Africa, no Anglo-French joint military planning took place prior to a meeting at Aden in June 1939. In 8–13 January January 1940, a second conference was held at Djibouti. There it was resolved to raise an "Ethiopian Legion" in the Anglo-Egyptian Sudan, but not to use it without an Italian declaration of war. The British Commander-in-Chief, Middle East, General Archibald Wavell, also agreed that the French commander-in-chief at Djibouti, Paul Legentilhomme, would hold supreme command over the military forces in both Somalilands should war come with Italy.

== War with Italy and armistice ==
=== Fighting during 10–25 June ===
Italy's declaration of war on France and Britain came on 10 June 1940, and the next day Legentilhomme was named supreme commander of all Allied forces in the Somaliland theatre. In French Somaliland he had a garrison of seven battalions of Senegalese and Somali infantry, three batteries of field guns, four batteries of anti-aircraft guns, a company of light tanks, four companies of militia and irregulars, two platoons of the camel corps and an assortment of aircraft.

Since the Allies were outnumbered by about 40,000 to 9,000 along the Somaliland frontier, (Note: Mockler puts the garrison of French Somaliland at about 10,000 men. He says that Legentilhomme planned to invade Ethiopia along the railway.) no offensive actions were planned, although Legentilhomme did receive an order on 11 June to resist "to the end" (jusqu'au bout). The intention was to pin down the Italians while stoking an Ethiopian revolt. The Italians did undertake some offensive actions beginning on 18 June. From Harrar Governorate, troops under General Guglielmo Nasi attacked the fort of Ali-Sabieh in the south and Dadda'to in the north. There were also skirmishes in the area of Dagguirou and around the lakes Abbe and Ally. Near Ali-Sabieh, there was some skirmishing over the Djibouti–Addis Ababa railway. In the first week of war, the Italian Navy sent the submarines Torricelli and Perla to patrol French territorial waters in the Gulf of Tadjoura in front of the ports of Djibouti, Tadjoura and Obock. (Note: For further information, see Red Sea Flotilla.) By the end of June the Italians had also occupied the border fortifications of Magdoul, Daimoli, Balambolta, Birt Eyla, Asmailo, Tewo, Abba, Alailou, Madda and Rahale.

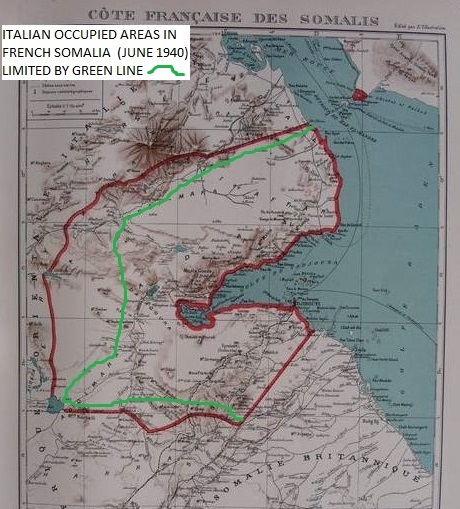
Territories of French Somalia occupied by Italian colonial troops (limited by green line)

On 17 June some Italian Meridionali Ro.37bis aircraft undertook reconnaissance of Djibouti, noting five or six warships in the port and about twenty aircraft at a nearby aerodrome. That same day, the French evacuated the outlying station of Dadda'to and Douméra on the border, although whether it had come under Italian attack is a matter of dispute. The French soon re-occupied it. On 21 June eleven Caproni Ca.133s bombed Djibouti in the largest raid of the colony's brief war. Anti-aircraft fire was intense and two Italian aircraft failed to return, but fires and explosions were seen in Djibouti. Overnight, several waves of Savoia-Marchetti SM.81 bombers attacked the port facilities. (Note: Mockler reports that four crashed.) On 22 June the Italians suspected the British might try to establish a forward base at Djibouti, and five Ro.37bis, four CR.42 and one CR.32 aircraft based out of Dire Dawa strafed the airfield there. An Italian pilot described this attack in his diary: "The anti-aircraft defence is very poor ... We make another turn to see if any of the French fighters will have the courage to take off. Not one!" (Note: This pilot's diary was captured and translated by the British. His identity is unknown.) Some French Potez 25 TOE reconnaissance aircraft bombed Italian installations at Dewele in retaliation. (Note: Upon his return to Dire Dawa, the Italian diarist noted that at noon "three French planes attack us by surprise—one of our planes is destroyed on the ground.")

=== Armistice of Villa Incisa ===
General Charles de Gaulle's appeal of 18 June for French officers and soldiers to ignore the impending Franco-Italian armistice was itself ignored by most officers in Somaliland. Only Legentilhomme himself was in favour of siding with De Gaulle and "Fighting France". On 25 June the Armistice of Villa Incisa came into effect, ending the war between Italy and France. It called for the demilitarisation of Somaliland "for the duration of hostilities between Italy and the British Empire," and granted Italy "full and constant right to use the port of Djibouti with all its equipment, together with the French section of the railway, for all kinds of transport" (article 3). The location for the surrender of "all movable arms and ammunition, together with those to be given up to the troops effecting the evacuation of the territory ... within 15 days" (article 5), the procedures for demobilisation and disarmament of French forces (article 9) and the conditions of wireless communication between France and the colonies (article 19) were left to an Italian Armistice Control Commission. Legentilhomme procrastinated in carrying out the armistice terms, since he had lost contact with the government in France. On 28 June, when the Italians demanded that he fulfill certain clauses, he denied all knowledge of any such clauses.

=== Fighting after the armistice ===
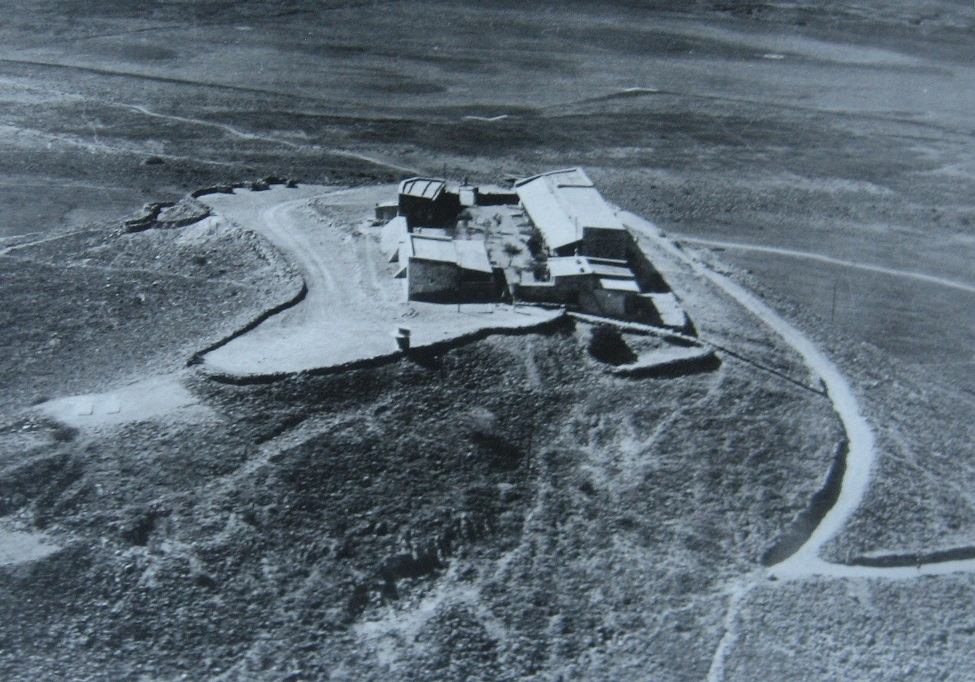
French fort at Ali-Sabieh, overlooking the railway, c. 1940

Between 1 and 10 July several clashes with the Italians took place on the plain of Hanlé, at Ali-Sabieh and along the railroad. The border area of western French Somaliland was occupied by Italian troops. Under increasing British pressure, they withdrew from Hanlé beginning in October 1940 and from Dagguirou by April 1941, when the French had returned. When the government on 10 July learned that the armistice was not yet in effect in Somaliland, President Philippe Pétain sent General Gaëtan Germain as his personal representative to correct the situation. Germain arrived at Asmara on 14 July. On 19 July the local conseil d'administration (administrative council) voted unanimously (with the exception of Legentilhomme) to remain loyal to Pétain's collaborationist government at Vichy. Germain then negotiated the resignation of Legentilhomme and convinced the armistice commission then being set up that it was inadvisable and impractical to demilitarise French Somaliland, in which approximately 8,000 soldiers (with tanks and airplanes) remained on guard. French troops with withdrawn from British Somaliland. On 23 July Germain succeeded Legentilhomme as commander-in-chief of French forces. On the same day, Governor Hubert Jules Deschamps ^{(FR)} was dismissed for his refusal to expel the British consul, with whom he had reached an agreement to supply the colony with food. Germain succeeded him as well, thus becoming the supreme civil and military authority in the colony. He entered Djibouti on 25 July. According to the Service historique de l'armée de terre, the official archives of the French army, which has a dossier of events in French Somaliland from 17 June through 11 July, the colony "ceased to be a theatre of operations" on 28 July.

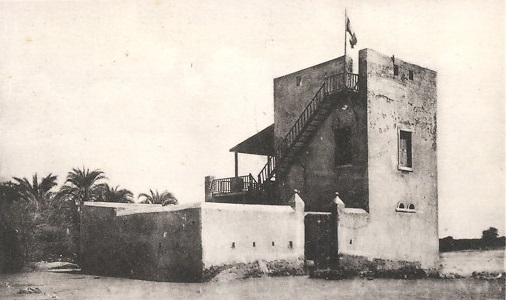
French fort at Loyada, occupied by the Italians in August 1940

On 2 August Legentilhomme and two officers, Captains Appert and des Essarts, refused an Italian offer of repatriation to France by air and defected to the British. They arrived in Aden on 5 August. The Italian chief of staff, Pietro Badoglio, had "with casual vindictiveness" ordered him shot if he fell into Italian hands, in accordance with paragraph 14 of the armistice convention which defined those leaving French territory to fight against Italy as "illegal combatants". Negotiations at Dewele on the local implementation of the armistice were only finally completed on 8 August. In a note penned that day, now in the Archives nationales d'Outre-mer, the French colonial official Edouard Chedeville recorded that "the Italians have taken by force our posts at Dadda'to and Balambolta, and occupied certain others after we had evacuated them, notably Dagguirou and Agna in the Hanlé, Hadela to the north of lake Abbe and possibly also Alailou.

During the period of uncertainty in Djibouti, the Duke of Aosta urged an attack on British Somaliland in order to cut off the French colony from British support. Benito Mussolini approved the campaign on 19 July, but the situation in Djibouti changed rapidly in Italy's favour after then. The 17th Colonial Brigade under Colonel Agosti occupied the French fort at Loyada on the border with British Somaliland in early August. When the Italian invasion of British Somaliland began on 3 August, the forces at Loyada moved on Zeila, which they had taken by 5 August. The French territory was completely surrounded on land by Italian possessions. Vichy managed to continue supplying it by submarine from Madagascar, and maintained direct contact by air through flights from France via Greece (usually terminating in Madagascar).

== Rule of Nouailhetas ==
On 18 September 1940, the Royal Navy established a blockade of French Somaliland (and dividing the colony) with ships based out of Aden. Pétain replaced Germain as governor with French Navy officer Pierre Nouailhetas in the same month. On 25 September, the Royal Air Force (RAF) carried out a bombing raid against Djibouti, prompting Nouailhetas to institute a brutal reign of terror. Europeans suspected of contact with the Allies were interned at Obock, while 45 others were condemned to death or forced labour, mostly in absentia. In May 1941 six Africans were shot without trial to set an example to potential deserters. The rule of Nouailhetas was too brutal for even the authoritarian leaders at Vichy to stand: in September 1942 he was recalled and forced to retire without a pension.

In the last week of November 1940, De Gaulle and British Prime Minister Winston Churchill met in London to discuss a proposed operation to take French Somaliland. Three Free French battalions, including Foreign Legionnaires, under Legentilhomme would establish themselves near the French Somali border and begin disseminating pro-Gaullist propaganda which justified the British attack on Mers-el-Kébir, the Anglo-French attack on Dakar and the Syria and Lebanon campaign. The Royal Navy was to ferry the Free French troops to East Africa. The French plan was enthusiastically approved by Churchill, but it was not implemented until the naval assets became available in February 1941. Nonetheless, in November a certain Major Hamilton went to Aden to begin preparing a "Mobile Force" for blowing up the railway from Djibouti to Dire Dawa. In the end, this plan was dropped, since it was not considered politic to upset the Vichyites at that moment.

On 24 March 1941, in an attempt to prevent an Italian withdrawal from British Somaliland, the RAF bombed a section of the Djibouti–Addis Ababa railway and met with heavy French anti-aircraft fire. By that time, the Allied offensive against the Italians had tightened their blockade of French Somaliland and a famine was setting in. Malnutrition-related diseases took many lives, 70% of them women and children. The locals named the blockade the carmii, a word for a type of sorghum usually reserved for cattle, but used as food for humans at the height of the famine.

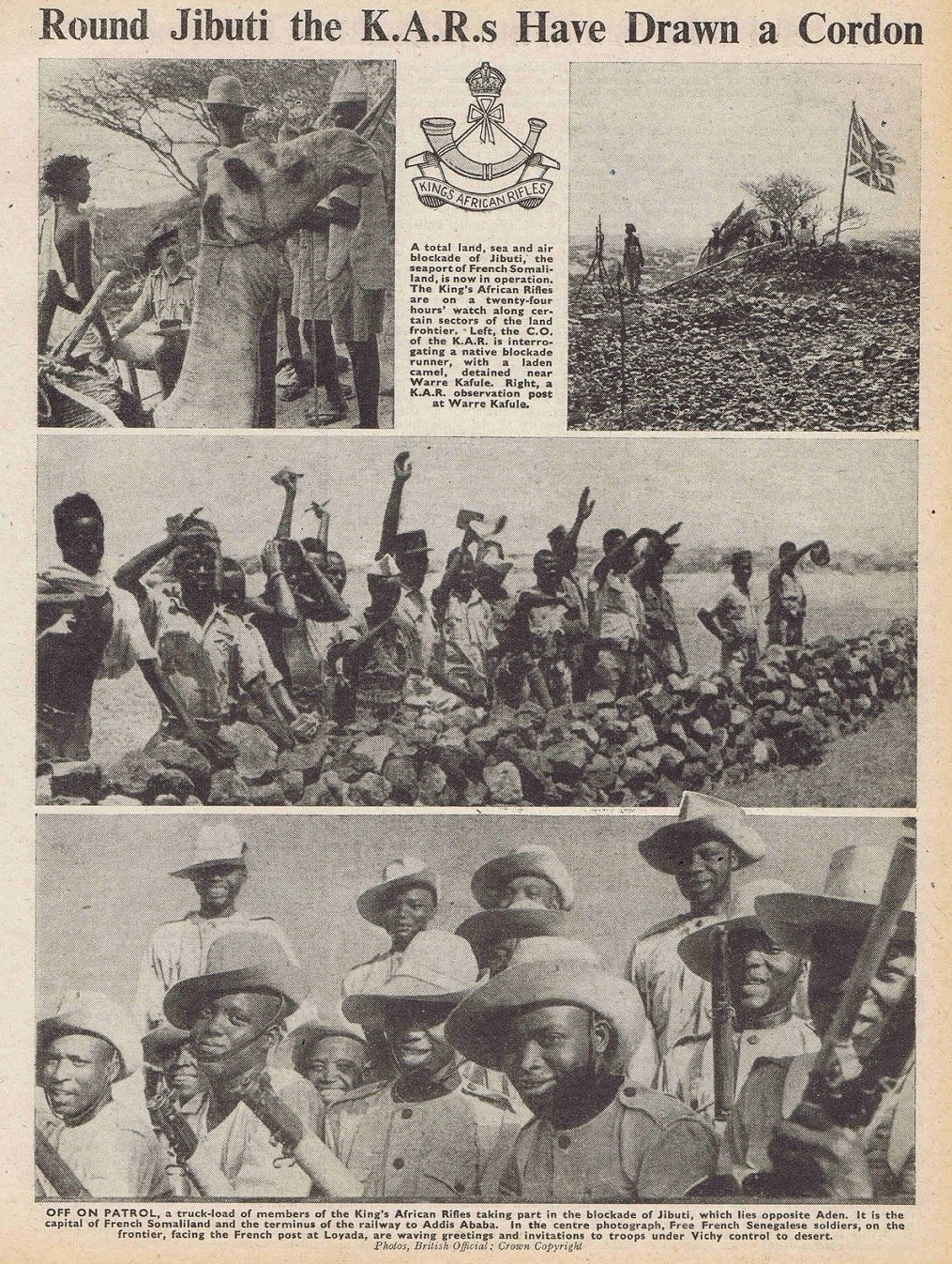
Photos of the King's African Rifles enforcing the Allied blockade

In March 1941, with Free French forces facing the Vichyite garrison in Somaliland, the British changed their policy to "rally French Somaliland to the Allied cause without bloodshed". The Free French were to arrange a voluntary "rallying" (ralliement) by means of propaganda while the British were to blockade the colony. Wavell considered that if British pressure was applied, a rally would appear to have been coerced. Wavell preferred to let the propaganda continue and provide a small amount of supplies under strict control. As part of this propaganda war, there were even competing newspapers: the Free French published Djibouti Libre ("Free Djibouti") and smuggled it into the colony, while the Vichy authorities published the official Djibouti Français ("French Djibouti").

In April, after the capture of Addis Ababa, the British tried to negotiate with Nouailhetas for transporting Italian prisoners-of-war along the Djibouti–Addis Ababa railway and evacuating them through Djibouti's port. On 1 May Nouailhetas telegraphed Aden to inform the British that he had received permission from Vichy to negotiate. On 8 May General Alan Cunningham responded with his proposals, but no commitments.

When the policy of stoking a "rally" had no immediate effect, Wavell suggested negotiations with Nouailhetas to obtain use of the port and railway. The suggestion was accepted by the British government but, because of the concessions granted to the Vichy regime in Syria and Lebanon, proposals were made to invade the colony instead. On 8 June, Nouailhetas was given an ultimatum. Wavell promised to lift the blockade and provide one month's worth of provisions if the colony declared for De Gaulle; otherwise the blockade would be tightened. Leaflets were dropped from the air to inform the inhabitants of French Somaliland of the British terms. Nouailhetas wrote to Aden on 15 June about the high rate of infant mortality owing to malnutrition in the territory, but he rejected the British terms. The British considered but ultimately rejected an invasion of French Somaliland because they could not spare the troops and did not wish to offend the local French, whom they hoped would join Free France. The 6th (Tanganyika) Battalion of the King's African Rifles (KAR), composed of troops from the Tanganyika Territory, were at this time deployed along the Zeila–Loyada and Ayesha–Dewele routes.

After the war, De Gaulle alleged that the British planned on bringing French Somaliland into their sphere of influence, and that this explained Britain's reluctance to use force to liberate a territory that would necessarily be surrendered to Allied forces at the end of the war. When negotiations resumed with Nouailhetas later in the summer, the British offered to evacuate the garrison and European civilians to another French colony upon surrender. Nouailhetas informed them that he would have to destroy the colony's railroads and port facilities prior to surrendering. As late as November flights from Italy were still landing in Djibouti, and on 11 December a RAF Mohawk fighter and a French Potez 631 exchanged shots over the British aerodrome at Ayesha.

Following the failure of negotiations and the final defeat of remaining Italian forces in the field by July 1941—with the exception of General Guglielmo Nasi at Gondar—French Somaliland was totally surrounded and cut off by British forces. All horses, donkeys and camels were consumed, as well as all fresh fruits and vegetables. Beriberi and scurvy spread and many townsfolk left for the desert, leaving their children to be cared for by the Catholic missions. The head doctor at the hospital committed suicide in despair. Only a few Arab dhows (boutres) managed to run the blockade from Djibouti to Obock; and only two French ships from Madagascar managed to run it. The Japanese declaration of war on the United States and the British Empire on 7 December 1941 gave the colony some respite, since the British were forced to withdraw all but two ships from the blockade for use in the East.

For six months (June 1941–January 1942), Nouailhetas remained willing to grant concessions over the port and railway but would not tolerate Free French interference. In October the blockade was reviewed but no changes were implemented before the beginning of the war with Japan. On 2 January 1942, the Vichy government offered the use of the port and railway, subject to the lifting of the blockade, but the British refused. At the same time, on account of the increased ease of the dhow trade, even the land blockade of the colony was lifted on 15 January 1942. The British ended the blockade unilaterally in March 1942.

== Rallying and liberation ==
A few defections from French Somaliland took place in 1941. Some air force pilots escaped to Aden to join the Escadrille française d'Aden under Jacques Dodelier, and Captain Edmond Magendie began training some non-commissioned officers who would become the backbone of the Bataillon de tirailleurs somalis ^{(FR)}, which later fought in Europe. Some Free French sloops also took part in the blockade. The Commander-in-Chief, East Africa, William Platt, codenamed the negotiations for the surrender of French Somaliland "Pentagon", because there were five sides: himself, the Vichy governor, the Free French, the British minister at Addis Ababa Robert George Howe, and the United States. The American consul at Aden, Clare H. Timberlake, even bluffed the acting British governor, John Hathorn Hall, into getting Frederick Hards, AOC Aden, to fly him to Djibouti to interview Nouailhetas before his dismissal. In the end the Americans apologised for this interference.

Only following Operation Streamline Jane—the Allied conquest of Madagascar (September–November 1942)—and Operation Torch—the Allied landing in French Morocco and Algeria in November 1942—did one third of the Somali garrison, the first battalion of Senegalese Tirailleurs under Colonel Georges Charles Raymond Raynal, cross the border into British Somaliland and defect. This prompted the new governor, Christian Raimond Dupont, to offer the British an economic agreement without surrender, but it was rejected. He was informed that if the colony surrendered without firing a shot, the French right to it would be respected in the post-war order. On hearing this, Dupont surrendered and Colonel Raynal's troops crossed back into French Somaliland on 26 December 1942, completing its liberation. The official handover took place at 10:00 p.m. on 28 December.

The first governor appointed under the Free French was André Bayardelle ^{(FR)}, transferred from New Caledonia in December 1942. Under Bayardelle, the Bataillon de tirailleurs somalis was recruited for service in Europe. Late in 1943 he was transferred to become Governor-General of French Equatorial Africa. His replacement, Raphaël Saller ^{(FR)}, took office on 13 January 1944. Shortly after he took office, a commission was created to examine those civil servants and other collaborators who had remained loyal to Vichy. In general, only their political allegiance during 1940–42 mattered, and Vichyites were dismissed from public service permanently. He too was shuffled along, and began a long career in the colonial service in French West Africa. The next governor, Jean Chalvet, was replaced within a few weeks by Jean Beyries as acting governor. Djibouti began to return to normal in mid-1945 when a sufficient number of natives who had fled to neighbouring countries had returned so that the port could operate again. Provisions were coming in from Ethiopia, Madagascar and French North Africa. The power plant was in poor condition and electricity functioned only intermittently, while the rail infrastructure was in disrepair and awaiting deliveries on orders placed in the United States when the war ended.

== List of governors during the war ==
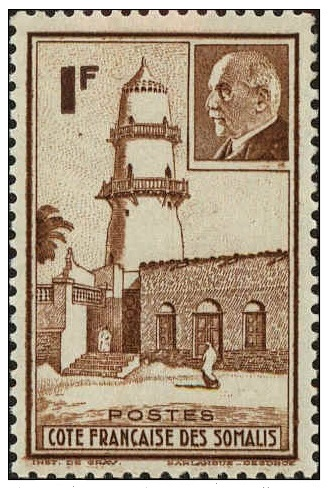
Vichy France stamp issued in 1941, with an image of Pétain

- Hubert Jules Deschamps (2 May 1939 – 25 July 1940), previously acting governor
- Gaëtan Louis Élie Germain (25 July–7 August 1940)
- Pierre Marie Élie Louis Nouailhetas (7 August 1940 – 21 October 1942)
- Auguste Charles Jules Truffert (21 October–4 December 1942)
- Christian Raimond Dupont (4–26 December 1942)
- Ange Marie Charles André Bayardelle (30 December 1942 – 22 June 1943)
- Michel Raphaël Antoine Saller (13 January–1 May 1944), previously acting governor
- Jean Victor Louis Joseph Chalvet (1 May 1944 – 30 April 1946)
  - Jean Beyries (14 May 1944–December 1945), acting governor

== Bibliography ==
- "The Franco-Italian Armistice". Bulletin of International News. 17 (14): 852–854. 13 July 1940.
- Alwan, Daoud Aboubaker; Mibrathu, Yohanis (2000). Historical Dictionary of Djibouti. Scarecrow Press. OCLC 45899363.
- Burgwyn, James H. (1997). Italian Foreign Policy in the Interwar Period, 1918–1940. Praeger Publishers. ISBN 978-0-275-94877-1.
- Clark, Martin (2005). Mussolini (1st ed.). Routledge. ISBN 978-0-582-06595-6.
- Ebsworth, W. A. (1953). "Jibouti and Madagascar in the 1939–45 War". Journal of the Royal United Service Institution. 98 (592): 564–68. doi:10.1080/03071845309422199.
- Ferry, Vital (2005). Croix de Lorraine et Croix du Sud, 1940–1942: aviateurs belges et de la France Libre en Afrique. Éditions du Gerfaut. ISBN 2-914622-92-9.
- Imbert-Vier, Simon (2008). Frontières et limites à Djibouti durant la période coloniale (1884–1977) (PhD thesis). Université de Provence–Aix-Marseille I.
- Knox, MacGregor (1982). Mussolini Unleashed, 1939–1941: Politics and Strategy in Fascist Italy's Last War. Cambridge University Press.
- Mockler, Anthony (1984). Haile Selassie's War: The Italian−Ethiopian Campaign, 1935–1941. New York: Random House. ISBN 0-394-54222-3.
- Moyse-Bartlett, H. (2012). The King's African Rifles, Volume 2. Andrews UK Limited. ISBN 978-1781506639.
- Picone Chiodo, Marco (1990). In nome della resa: l'Italia nella guerra 1940–1945. Mursia.
- Playfair, I. S. O.; Flynn, F. C.; Molony, C. J. C.; Toomer, S. E. (2004) [1956]. Butler, J. R. M. (ed.). The Mediterranean and Middle East: The Germans Come to the Help of their Ally (1941). History of the Second World War, United Kingdom Military Series. Vol. II. Naval & Military Press. ISBN 1-84574-066-1.
- Raugh, H. E. (1993). Wavell in the Middle East, 1939–1941: A Study in Generalship. London: Brassey's. ISBN 0-08-040983-0.
- Rovighi (1995). Le operazioni in Africa orientale (giugno 1940 – novembre 1941). Volume II: Documenti. Rome: Stato Maggiore dell'Esercito.
- Shores, Christopher (1996). Dust Clouds in the Middle East: Air War for East Africa, Iraq, Syria, Iran and Madagascar, 1940–42. London: Grub Street.
- Thompson, Virginia McLean; Adloff, Richard (1968). Djibouti and the Horn of Africa. Stanford University Press.
