= Human trafficking in Djibouti =

Djibouti is a transit and, to a lesser extent, a source and destination country for men, women, and children who are subjected to trafficking in people, specifically conditions of forced labor and forced prostitution. There is little verifiable data on the human trafficking situation in Djibouti. An estimated 150 000 voluntary economic migrants from Ethiopia and Somalia passed illegally through Djibouti en route to Yemen and other locations in the Middle East in 2022; among this group, a small number of women and girls may fall victim to involuntary domestic servitude or forced commercial sexual exploitation after reaching Djibouti City or the Ethiopia-Djibouti trucking corridor. An unknown number of migrants – men, women, and children – are subjected to conditions of forced labor and forced prostitution after reaching Yemen and other destinations in the Middle East. Djibouti's large refugee population – consisting of Somalis and Ethiopians – as well as foreign street children remain vulnerable to various forms of exploitation within the country, including human trafficking. Older street children reportedly act, at times, as pimps for younger children. A small number of girls from impoverished Djiboutian families may engage in prostitution with the encouragement of family members or other people in prostitution. Members of foreign militaries stationed in Djibouti contribute to the demand for women and girls in prostitution, including trafficking victims.

In 2009 the Government of Djibouti did not fully comply with the minimum standards for the elimination of trafficking; however, it is making significant efforts to do so. Senior officials have identified combating human trafficking as an important priority, sought increased partnerships with other governments and international organizations over the past year, and demonstrated a growing awareness of the distinction between human trafficking and smuggling. The government, however, remains unable to effectively implement all of the protection, prevention, and prosecution components of its anti-trafficking law given its lack of resources. Addressing migrant smuggling and daunting refugee flows remained a main concern, diverting government attention and limited law enforcement resources that might otherwise have been devoted to detecting and responding to forms of trafficking occurring within the country's borders. It is believed, however, that the government's efforts to reduce migrant smuggling to Yemen will ultimately serve to reduce the overall number of such migrants who are vulnerable to situations of human trafficking in the Middle East.

The U.S. State Department's Office to Monitor and Combat Trafficking in people placed the country in "Tier 3" in 2023.

Djibouti ratified the 2000 UN TIP Protocol in April 2005.

In 2023, the Organised Crime Index gave Djibouti a score of 6.5 out of 10 for human trafficking, noting that numbers of trafficked people had increased after Covid.

An independent report in 2023 noted that the country of Djibouti (especially Obock city) is a major transit point for Ethiopians being trafficked to Saudi Arabia, with an average of 12,000 people travelling through the country each month.

== Prosecution (2009) ==
The government made significant efforts to bring migrant smugglers to justice during the reporting period, but failed to take law enforcement action against forced labor or sex trafficking offenders. Law 210, "Regarding the Fight Against Human Trafficking", enacted in December 2007, prohibits both labor and sex trafficking. The law also provides for the protection of victims regardless of ethnicity, gender, or nationality, and prescribes penalties of up to 30 years' imprisonment for convicted trafficking offenders. These penalties are sufficiently stringent and commensurate with those prescribed for other serious crimes, such as rape. During the reporting period, the Djiboutian military regularly buried the remains of shipwrecked migrants who drowned after failed smuggling attempts. The smugglers of these migrants, when captured by Djiboutian authorities, were transferred to the judicial system for prosecution. The Ministry of Justice reported its use of Law 210 in the one year period since the law came into motion to prosecute, convict, and sentenced well over 100 illegal migrant smugglers and their accomplices, including Djiboutian citizens. It is unclear whether any of these cases involved human trafficking. The Ministry of Justice reported no investigations or prosecutions of offenses involving forced labor or commercial sexual exploitation. The Brigade des Moeurs (Vice Police) conducted regular nighttime sweeps of the capital's bars and streets and preventatively detained Ethiopian, Somali, and Djiboutian children suspected to be engaged in prostitution. In 2009, police apprehended, but did not charge, 408 girls between the ages of 10 and 18 years in such sweeps; the brigade did not indicate whether it detained the exploiters of these girls. In November 2009, the government requested human trafficking be added to the agenda for regular Djibouti-Ethiopia bilateral talks and proposed a draft memorandum of understanding on the subject. The 15-article agreement commits specific government entities to liaise on trafficking issues, proposes regular meetings, and provides a framework for partnership with Ethiopia on judicial cooperation.

More recently, in 2016, the government passed Law No. 133, "On the Fight Against Trafficking in people and Illicit Smuggling of Migrants, criminalized sex trafficking and labor trafficking". This piece of legislation prescribed penalties of five to ten years of prison with aggravating circumstances such as forcing a victim or a child into prostitution increasing the penalty from ten to twenty years. These measures did not have much effect, in fact no individual has been for trafficking since 2017. Most potential human trafficking crimes moved forward as migrant smuggling charges, resulting in more lenient sentences; this approach likely weakened deterrence and did not adequately address the nature of trafficking crimes. One notable example of this is the printed copy of the penal code used by some judges that was out of date and did not include the 2016 anti-trafficking law; therefore, in practice, most judges did not use the 2016 anti-trafficking law to convict alleged traffickers and instead relied on older provisions from the 1995 penal code, such as kidnapping or abuse of power. Observers reported police did not always pursue reports with potential trafficking indicators. Severe resource and capacity limitations continued to impede officials’ ability to comprehensively investigate trafficking crimes.

== Protection (2009) ==
With few resources itself and a very small pool of tiny, underfunded NGOs, the government had little means with which to address the needs of trafficking victims during the year. The Council of Ministers took no action in 2009 to ensure comprehensive care for victims, as mandated under Article 18 of Law 210. After detaining children on suspicion of engaging in prostitution, police indicated that they attempted to locate and meet with parents or other family members to discuss appropriate child protection; children were then released to the care of family members without being charged. When family members could not be found, foreign children may have been deported to their country of origin; the government did not report data on such deportations. Police worked with the Ministry of Health's clinic and hospitals, and with NGOs, to provide some medical care to victims of child prostitution. No charges were filed against children detained on suspicion of engaging in prostitution in 2009. Authorities did not encourage victims to participate in the investigations or prosecutions of their traffickers. Djibouti hosted a meeting of the Somalia Mixed Migration Task Force in July 2009, during which representatives from the Government of Yemen, the Somaliland and Puntland administrations, and international organizations discussed efforts to improve protection for migrants crossing from Somalia and Djibouti to Yemen.

== Prevention (2009) ==
The government's efforts to prevent trafficking increased during the reporting period. Beginning in May 2009, the government provided IOM office space within the Ministry of Labor as part of an overall effort to prevent unsafe migration, including human trafficking. Addressing concerns for migrants who depart Djiboutian shores illegally for Yemen, the government forged a partnership with IOM to erect billboards throughout the country warning migrants of the dangers of irregular migration, including the risk of becoming a victim of trafficking or labor exploitation. In 2009, the National Office for Refugees and Disaster Stricken People (ONARS) and UNHCR completed a census of refugees at the Ali Adde camp and issued identification cards to adults. These entities also jointly conducted twice-weekly screenings of asylum seekers at the Loyada border crossing before transporting eligible refugees to UNHCR's reception center. The government worked to reduce the demand for commercial sex acts by continuing to investigate child sexual exploitation cases and deploying a regular police vice squad. The government did not take any known measures to reduce the demand for forced labor.
