= 1946 French Somaliland Representative Council election =

Representative Council elections were held in French Somaliland in March 1946.

== Electoral system ==
The 20 member council was elected in two colleges, each of which elected ten members. The first college had six seats directly elected by French citizens, whilst the second college had six seats directly elected seats, with Somalis, Afars and Arabs each electing two members.

The remaining four seats in each college were appointed by the governor; three members chosen by the Governor from a list of nine candidates presented by the Chamber of Commerce, and one member chosen by the governor from a list of three presented by Unions.

== Results ==
| College | Ethnic group | Votes cast | Registered voters | Turnout |
|---|---|---|---|---|
| First college | | 326 | 726 | 44.9 |
| Second college | Afars | 37 | 146 | 25.3 |
| Second college | Arabs | 70 | 150 | 46.7 |
| Second college | Somalis | 118 | 228 | 51.8 |
| Second college | Total | 225 | 524 | 42.9 |
| Total | | 551 | 1,250 | 44.1 |
Source: Sternberger et al.
