= 1973 French legislative election in Afars and Issas =

Elections to the French National Assembly were held in French Somaliland on 4 March 1973 as part of the wider French parliamentary elections. Omar Farah Iltireh was elected as the territory's MP.

== Results ==
| Candidate | Votes | % |
|---|---|---|
| Omar Farah Iltireh | 22,433 | 71.35 |
| Ibrahim Harbi Farah | 9,006 | 28.65 |
| Total | 31,439 | 100.00 |
| Valid votes | 31,439 | 87.53 |
| Invalid/blank votes | 4,480 | 12.47 |
| Total votes | 35,919 | 100.00 |
| Registered voters/turnout | 45,030 | 79.77 |
Source: Sternberger et al
