= 1968 French legislative election in Afars and Issas =

Elections to the French National Assembly were held in Afars and Issas on 23 June 1968 as part of the wider French parliamentary elections. Moussa Ali Abdoulkader was re-elected as the territory's MP.

== Results ==
Candidate	Votes	%
Moussa Ali Abdoulkader	27,548	85.07
Cheikho Ahmed Mohamed Issa	4,836	14.93
Total	32,384	100.00
Valid votes	32,384	91.14
Invalid/blank votes	3,148	8.86
Total votes	35,532	100.00
Registered voters/turnout	41,425	85.77
Source: Sternberger et al.
