= Aïcha Bogoreh Darrar =

First Lady of Djibouti
- In role 27 June 1977 – 8 May 1999
- President: Hassan Gouled Aptidon
- Preceded by: Role Established
- Succeeded by: Kadra Mahamoud Haid

Personal details
- Born: 1928 Dikhil, French Somaliland
- Died: August 5, 2001 (aged 72–73) Addis Ababa, Ethiopia
- Party: People's Rally for Progress
- Spouse: Hassan Gouled Aptidon

Aïcha Bogoreh Darrar (Arabic: عائشة بوغوره; 1928 – 5 August 2001) was a Djiboutian independence and women's rights activist. She was the inaugural First Lady of Djibouti.

Aïcha Bogoreh Darrar was born into a family of railway workers in 1928 in Dikhil, then part of French Somaliland, She married Hassan Gouled Aptidon, a nurse and future President of Djibouti. She marshalled women to vote on behalf of both independence and his political career. She became first lady when her husband became the first president of an independent Djibouti.

She headed the first National Union of Djiboutian Women (UNFD) from 1977 to 1999. The organization offered literacy and vocational classes for women. She also founded the Aïcha Bogoreh Mother and Child Centre for orphaned children.

Aïcha Bogoreh Darrar died on 5 August 2001 in Addis Ababa, Ethiopia.
