= Democratic Union Issa =

Political party of French Somaliland and the French Territory of the Afars and the Issas

The Democratic Union Issa (UDI) was an anti-independence political party of French Somaliland and the French Territory of the Afars and the Issas.

== History ==
It was created in the early 1960s by militants previously allied with Mahmoud Harbi, who, after a schism in the Somali nationalist movement, sided with his rival, Hassan Gouled Aptidon who led the party. During the 1960s, the UDI included those Issas who opposed the Popular Movement Party, and independence. Then headed by Omar Farah Iltireh, UDI was in favor of maintaining the territory under French sovereignty during March 1967 referendum.

In 1967, the IDU had around 100 members. As one of four political parties allowed to stand for election, the party won the local elections in November 1968 in the riding of Ali Sabieh and obtained three seats in the Territorial Assembly. In 1971, The party again won the election in Ali Sabieh, as the "people of the Rally Issa". In February 1972, it merged with two other parties to form the African People's League for the Independence (LPAI).

== Bibliography ==
- Ali Coubba, Djibouti, une nation en orage, Paris, L'Harmattan, 1993
- Fantu Agonafer, Djibouti's Three-Front Struggle for Independence: 1967–77, PhD, University of Denver, 1979, 204 p.
- Tholomier (Robert), A Djibouti, avec les Afars et les Issas, Cagnes-sur-mer, auto-édité (sous le pseudonyme de Robert Saint-Véran), 1977, 272 p.
