= Groupe RTD =

Djiboutian band

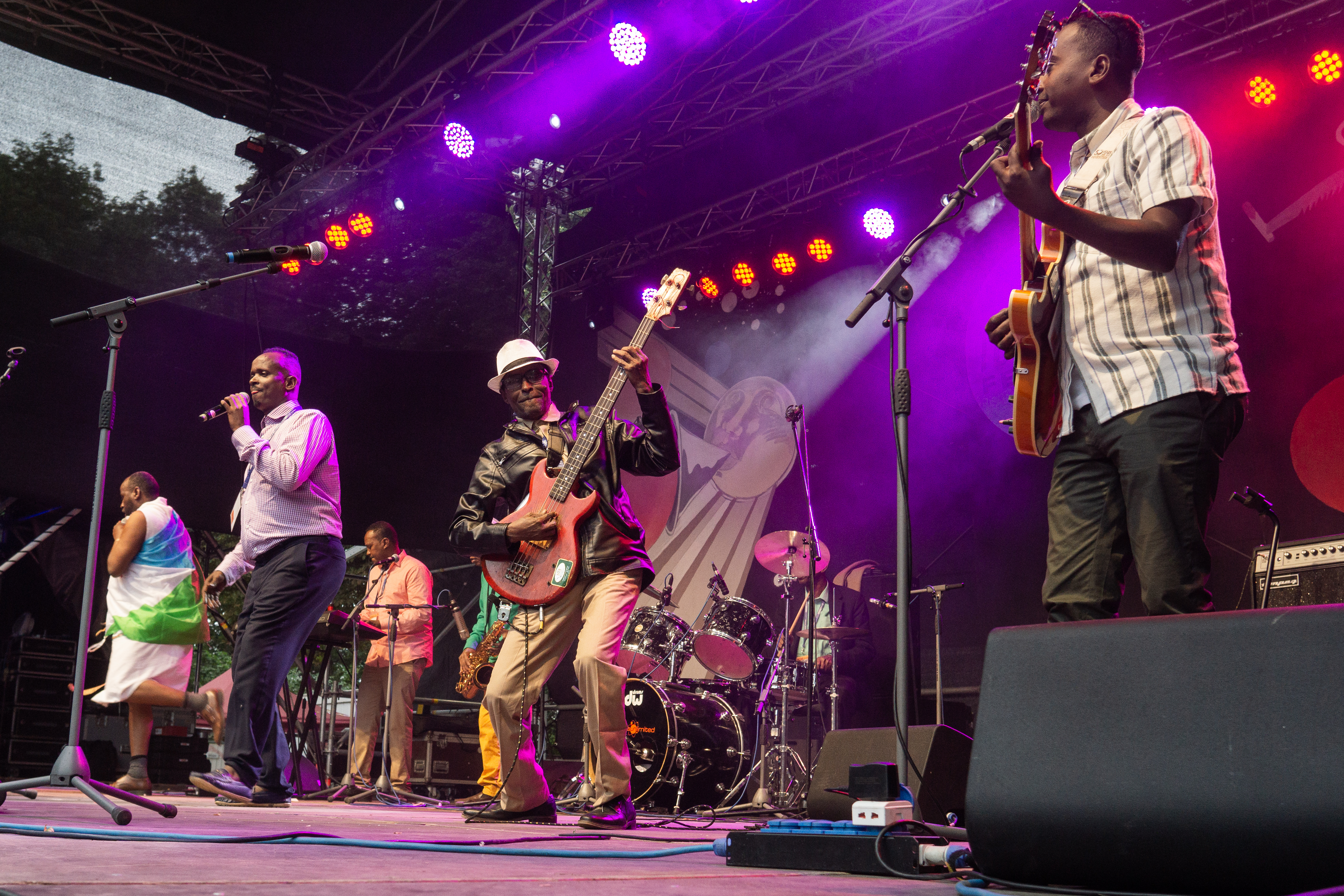
- Groupe RTD performing in 2022

Background information
- Origin: Djibouti City, Djibouti
- Labels: Ostinato
- Members: Mohamed Abdi Alto; Asma Omar; Guessod Abdo Hamargod; Hassan Omar Houssein; Omar Farah Houssein Moussa Aden Ainan; Abdirazak Hagi Sufi; Abdo Houssein Handeh; Salem Mohamed Ahmed

Groupe RTD are the in-house band of Radio Television of Djibouti, the state-owned national broadcaster of Djibouti. In their role as national band, Groupe RTD perform for visiting dignitaries and at Djiboutian presidential ceremonies. Their debut commercial album The Dancing Devils of Djibouti was recorded in 3 days in 2019, and released internationally in June 2020 on Ostinato Records, making it the first international album release from Djibouti.

== History ==
Djibouti gained its independence from France in 1977. Since then the popular music industry has been entirely state-run. Groupe RTD was created to be the in-house band of Radio Television of Djibouti (RTD), the state-owned national broadcaster of Djibouti. They regularly play for visiting dignitaries and at Djiboutian presidential ceremonies.

Groupe RTD consists of saxophonist Mohamed Abdi Alto, vocalists Asma Omar, Guessod Abdo Hamargod, and Hassan Omar Houssein, drummer Omar Farah Houssein, keyboardist Moussa Aden Ainan, guitarist Abdirazak Hagi Sufi "Kaajaa", bassist Abdo Houssein Handeh, and dumbek player Salem Mohamed Ahmed. The band has existed with its current line-up since 2013, and is a mix of old and young musicians, some of the best in Djibouti. Alto and Sufi were both established musicians in Somalia before moving to Djibouti. Singer Asma Omar is the only woman in the band, and the youngest member; she won a contest to be able to join.

In 2016 Ostinato Records founder Vik Sohonie and his friend Janto Djassi travelled to Djibouti to explore the music in the RTD archives, which Sohonie claims houses "the entire catalogue of Djiboutian music from independence until today." While there, the head of the RTD invited them to hear Groupe RTD, who were playing in the recording studio next door. Sohonie and Djassi returned to Djibouti in 2019 to record the group. They recorded for 3 days, and released the recordings on the album The Dancing Devils of Djibouti in June 2020, the first international album release from Djibouti.

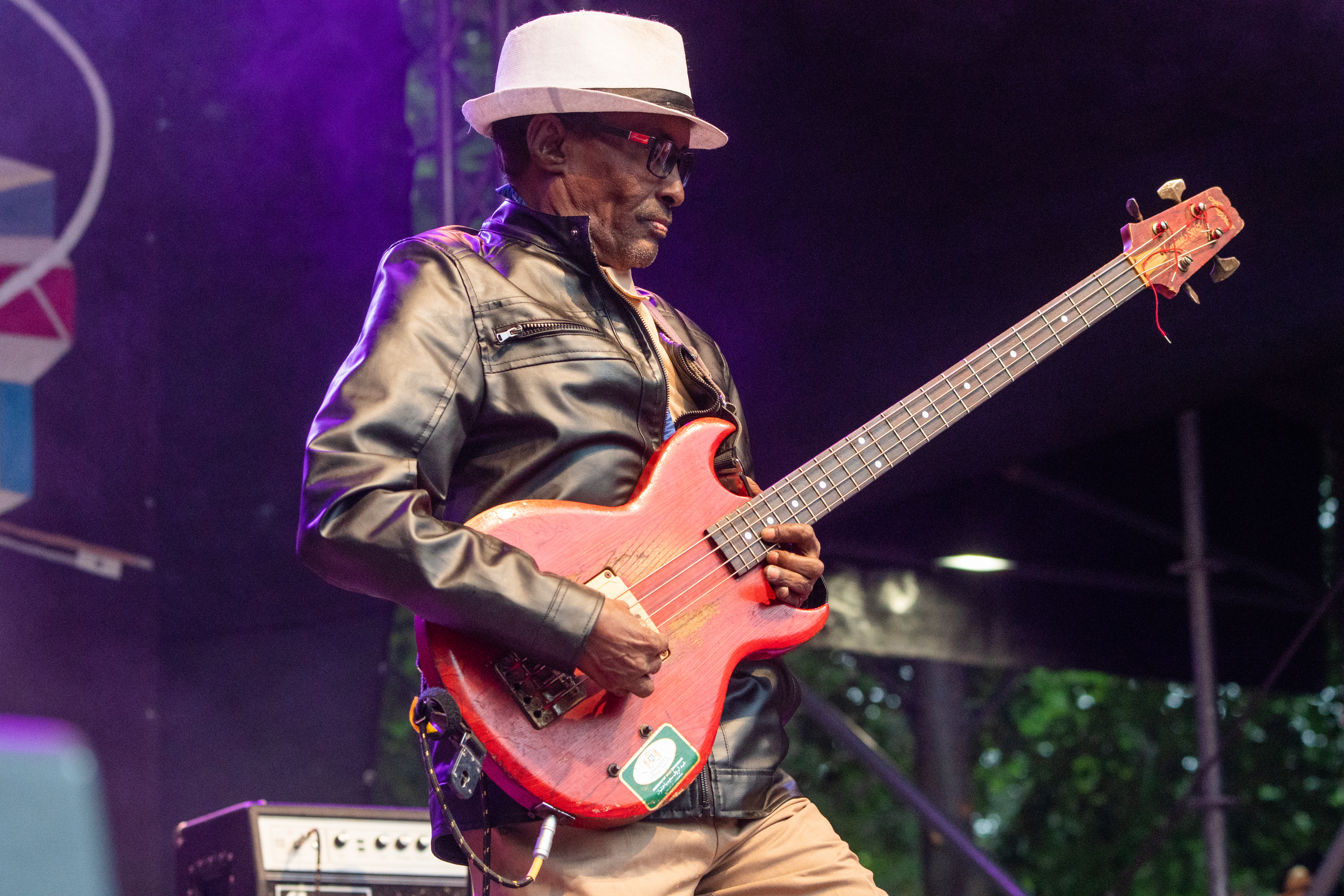
Abdirazak Hagi Sufi

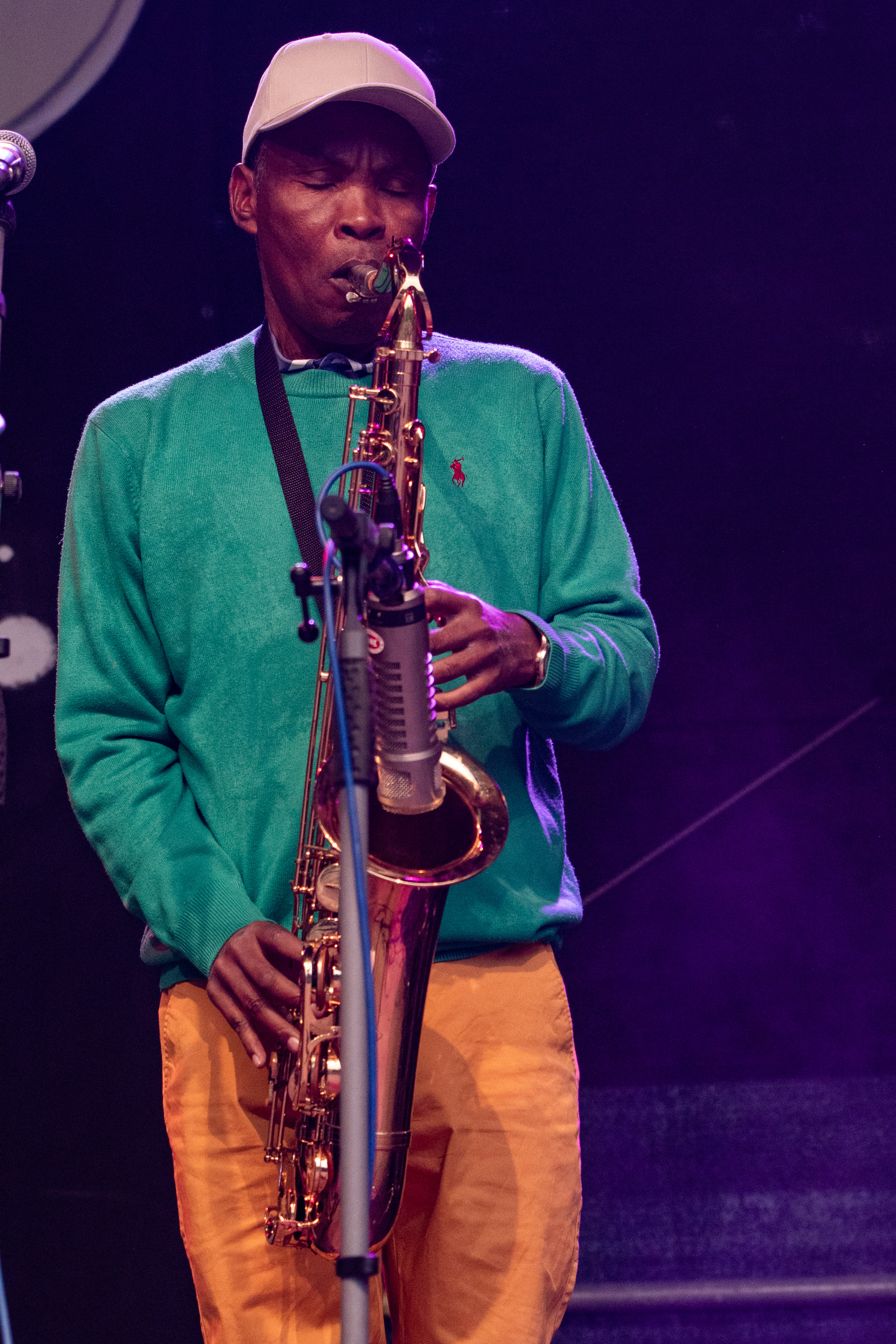
Mohamed Abdi Alto

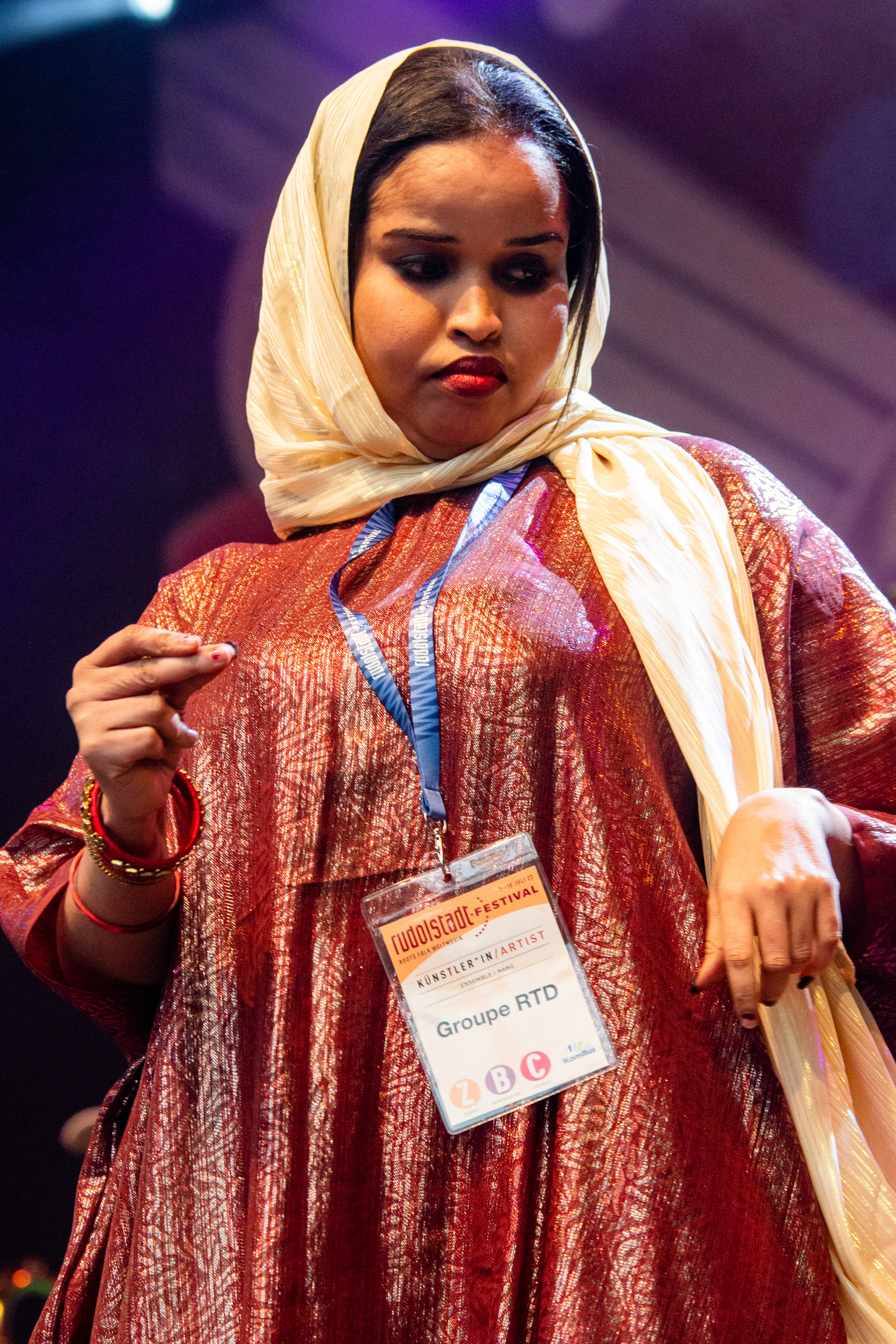
Asma Omar

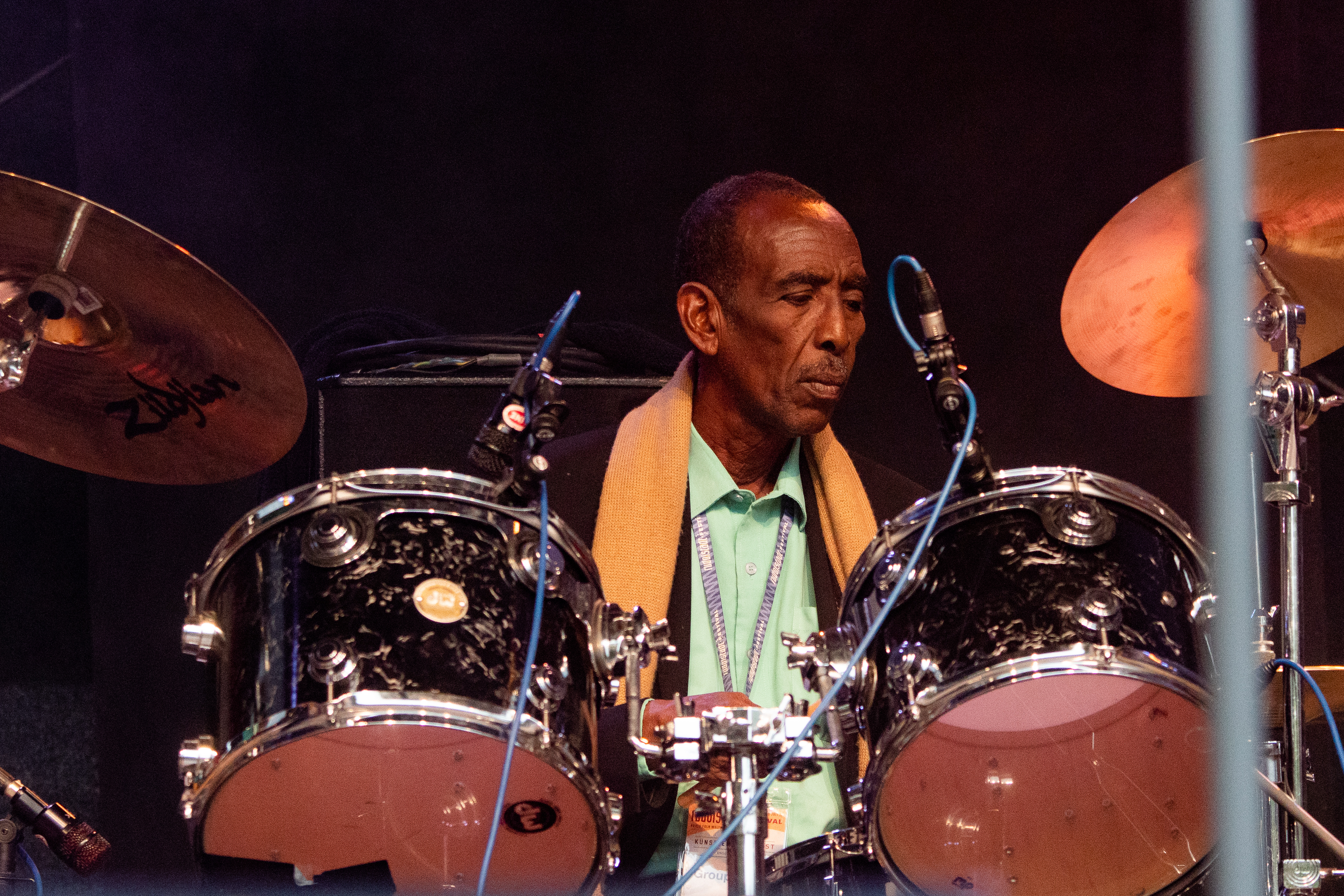
Omar Farah Houssein

Groupe RTD performing at Rudolstadt-Festival in 2022.

== Musical style ==
Geographically, Djibouti is at the confluence of the African and Asian continents, which influences its culture. The style of Groupe RTD is influenced by music from Ethiopia, Somalia, the Middle East, and India. Saxophonist Mohamed Abdi Alto is greatly influenced by US jazz, and guitarist Abdirazak Hagi Sufi by Jamaican reggae. The vocalists of Groupe RTD told Sohonie that they learned to sing by mimicking the style of singers in Bollywood films.

== Discography ==
Albums

- The Dancing Devils of Djibouti (Ostinato, 2020)
