= First ladies of Djibouti =

First Lady of Djibouti

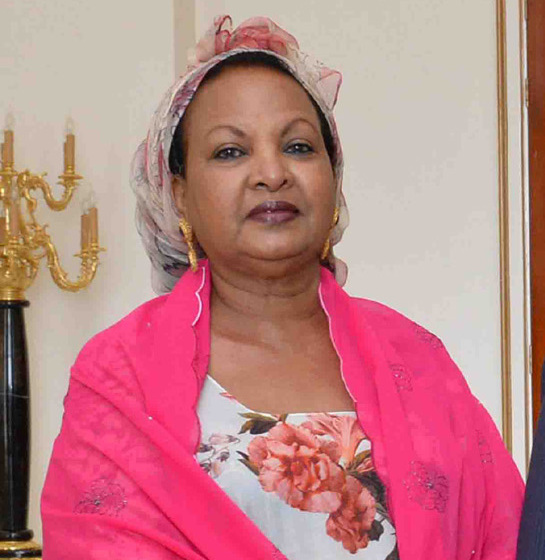
- Incumbent; Kadra Mahamoud Haid since May 8, 1999
- Residence: Presidential Palace
- Inaugural holder: Aicha Bogoreh
- Formation: June 27, 1977

The First Lady of Djibouti is the spouse of the president of Djibouti. The present first lady is Kadra Mahamoud Haid, wife of President Ismaïl Omar Guelleh. Guelleh assumed office on 8 May 1999.

Haid holds considerable influence in Djiboutian national politics. According to Africa Intelligence magazine, Kadra Mahamoud Haid serves as Djibouti's de facto vice president within her husband's government.

== First ladies of Djibouti ==
Name	Portrait	Term began	Term ended	President of Djibouti	Notes
Aïcha Bogoreh Darrar		June 27, 1977	May 8, 1999	Hassan Gouled Aptidon	Bogoreh focused on women's rights during her tenure as the country's inaugural first lady. She died in 2001 after leaving office.
Kadra Mahamoud Haid		May 8, 1999	Incumbent	Ismaïl Omar Guelleh	Haid "acts as a sort of vice president," according to observers.
