= Cercoux =

- Commune
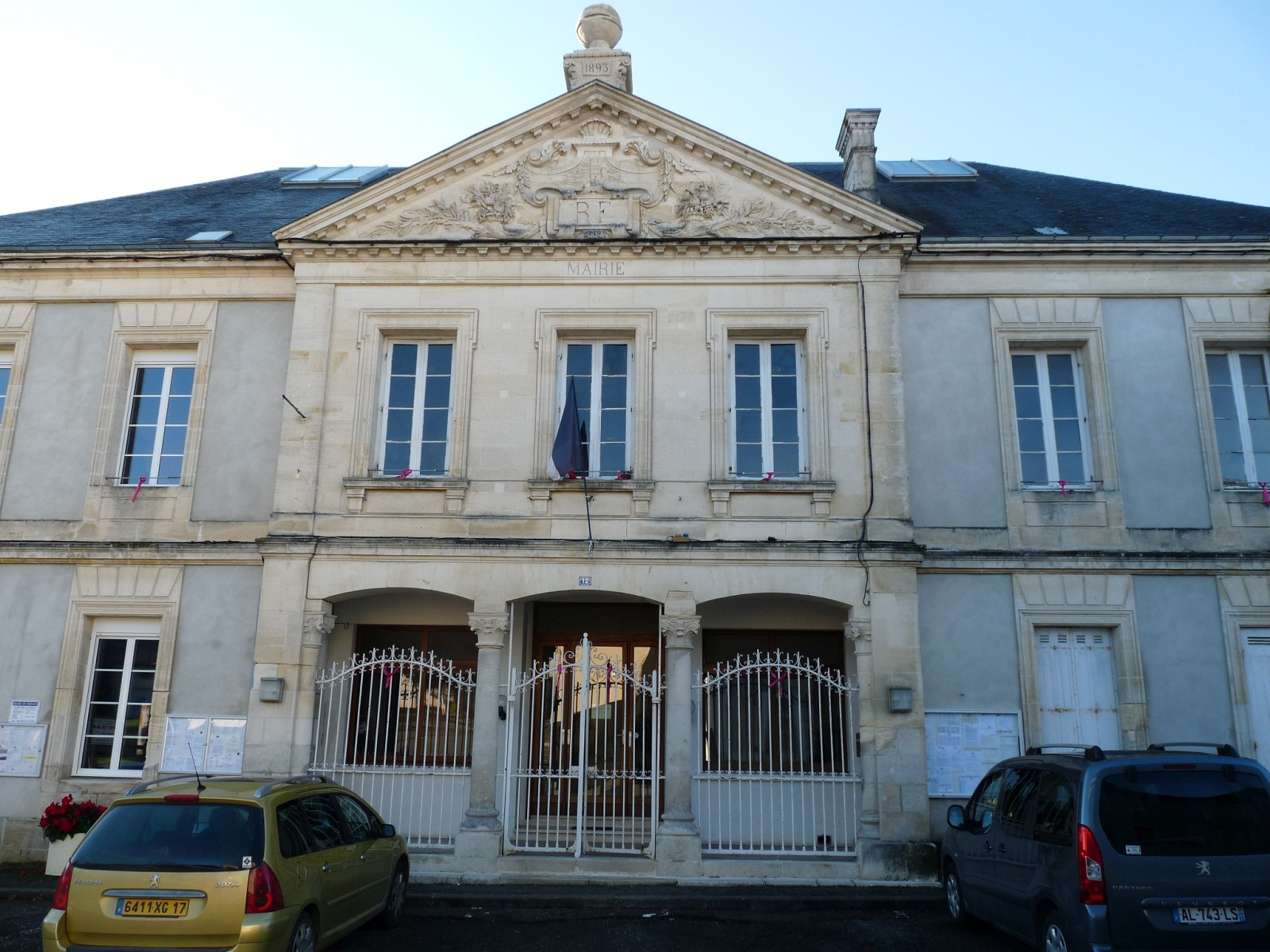
- The town hall in Cercoux
- Location of Cercoux
- Location within France Location within Nouvelle-Aquitaine
- Coordinates: 45°07′48″N 0°12′19″W
- Country: France
- Region: Nouvelle-Aquitaine
- Department: Charente-Maritime
- Arrondissement: Jonzac
- Canton: Les Trois Monts
- Intercommunality: Haute-Saintonge

Government
  - Mayor (2020–2026): Jeanne Blanc
- Area^{1}: 41.88 km^{2} (16.17 sq mi)
- Elevation: 86 m (282 ft)
- Highest elevation: 111 m (364 ft)
- Lowest elevation: 18 m (59 ft)
- Population (2023): 1,302
  - Density: 31.09/km^{2} (80.52/sq mi)
- Time zone: UTC+01:00 (CET)
  - Summer (DST): UTC+02:00 (CEST)
- INSEE/Postal code: 17077 /17270
- ^{1} French Land Register data, which excludes lakes, ponds, glaciers > 1 km^{2} (0.386 sq mi or 247 acres) and river estuaries.

Cercoux (French pronunciation: [sɛʁku]) is a commune in the Charente-Maritime department in southwestern France.

== Population ==
Historical population
Year	Pop.	±% p.a.
1968	1,226	—
1975	1,103	−1.50%
1982	1,204	+1.26%
1990	1,101	−1.11%
1999	1,065	−0.37%
2007	1,111	+0.53%
2012	1,224	+1.96%
2017	1,171	−0.88%
2023	1,302	+1.78%
Source: INSEE

== See also ==
- Communes of the Charente-Maritime department
