= Azebo Oromo =

Subgroup of the Oromo

The Azebo Oromo (Oromo: Azaboo, Tigrinya: ዓዘቦ ʿAzäbo, also transcribed as Azebo Galla) are, together with the Rayya, the northernmost subgroup of the Oromo, the largest ethnic group in Ethiopia.

They live on the eastern edge of the highlands in the southeast of the Tigray Region, where a Raya Azebo woreda named after them exists.

== History ==
The Azebo Oromo belonged to the Barentuma branch of the Oromo and migrated from the south into their present territories during the Oromo expansion in the 16th century. Historically, they are closely related to the Rayya (Raya, Raayyaa), and both groups, according to their traditions, came from Awashgama, "beyond the Awash River."

According to Nathaniel Pearce, at the beginning of the 19th century they practiced their traditional religion, revered the Wanza tree as sacred, and lived as nomadic pastoralists in a large, dense forest area, occasionally attacking their neighbors.

Despite contact and intermingling with the Christian Tigray and Amhara peoples of the highlands, according to J. Spencer Trimingham and Mohammed Hassen the Azebo Oromo alongside other northern Oromo groups adopted Islam sometime in the mid-19th century as a way to maintain cultural distance from their Christian neighbors and preserve their independence.

From the late 19th century, the Ethiopian state attempted to control the Rayya and Azebo Oromo in order to end their traditional warfare, to control and collect tribute on the trade route to Eritrea and the Red Sea, and at times to convert them to Ethiopian Orthodox Christianity. Yohannes IV sent troops who plundered and destroyed villages. In 1896, Menelik II's troops crossed the area on their return from the Battle of Adwa, where they plundered and slaughtered livestock. During Zewditu's reign, the Azebo Oromo rebelled against the governor of Tigray. In 1928, Ras Gugsa Araya Selassie was appointed to govern them, but he failed to establish his rule.

During the Second Italo-Ethiopian War they allied themselves with the Italians, taking part in the Battle of Maychew where they suffered 1,600 casualties. Italian journalist Dominic Quirico describes their role as follows

The most methodical and horrific massacre suffered by Haile Selassie's army was not only Badoglio's planes filled with poisonous mustard gas, but also the Oromo Azebu Galla, who allied themselves with Italy. They were the bitter enemies of the Amhara, and they slaughtered, robbed, and castrated thousands of warriors struggling to return home. And this to steal their rifles, the thalers in their pockets, a more colorful cloak, a mule, and to settle old scores. They were the ones who slaughtered the old warlord, Ras Mulugheta, while he, brokenhearted, stood vigil over the body of his son, also a victim of those tireless jackals.

After the formation of Italian East Africa, the Azebo Galla were incorporated into the colony of Eritrea, going on to form a commissariat with the name of Country of the Galla and with the town of Alamata as its capital.

After the end of the Italian occupation in 1941, conflicts with the Ethiopian state authorities arose again. The state blamed the Rayya and Azabo for endangering the road from Addis Ababa to Asmara and attacked them in 1942. In 1943, both groups therefore participated in the Woyane rebellion, in which peasants and some of the nobility of Tigray turned against the central government of Haile Selassie. Following the uprising, the state confiscated the land of the Rayya and Azabo, which is traditionally the most severe form of punishment in Ethiopia. Much of their territory was also transferred from Tigray to the neighboring southern province of Wollo. The Rayya and Azabo became landless and had to lease the land that had once belonged to them. Land conflicts in the area increased significantly. The expropriation contributed to the fact that the Rayya and Azabo were particularly hard hit by the 1972–1975 Wollo famine.

With the adoption of ethnic federalism in 1994 and the abolishment of the Awrajja administrative structure, the territories of the northernmost Oromo groups were assigned to the Tigray Region. The Oromo Liberation Front unsuccessfully demanded their annexation to the Oromia Region in 1994. In the last couple of decades, due to assimilation, most members of the Azebo Oromo presently identify as Tigrayans.
