= Omar Farah Iltireh =

Djiboutian politician (1933-2008)

- Farah Iltireh as a member of the French National Assembly

French MP for French Territory of the Afars and the Issas
- In office 2 April 1973 – 2 April 1978
- Preceded by: Moussa Ali Abdoulkader
- Succeeded by: Position abolished (independence of Djbouti)

Member of the TFAI assembly
- Incumbent
- Assumed office November 1968

Personal details
- Born: 1933 Djibouti
- Died: 6 May 2008 (aged 74–75) France
- Party: Union of Democrats for the Republic

Omar Farah Iltireh (Somali: Cumar Faarax Ciiltire) (1933 in Ali-Sabieh, Djibouti - 2008 in France) is a politician of the French Territory of the Afars and the Issas, (TAFI) which became the Republic of Djibouti in 1977. He died in France on May 6, 2008.

== Career ==
He began his career as a teacher before entering politics.

During the 1967 French Somaliland independence referendum, Farah Iltireh worked with the Democratic Union Issa group for the "yes" campaign, seeking to maintain the territory under French sovereignty. The campaign was successful, and Dbjouti remained under French control, reorganized as the French Territory of the Afars and the Issas. In November 1968 Omar Farah was elected to the TFAI Assembly under the list headed by Ali Aref Bourhan and was appointed minister of public service in local government.

He was elected to the French National Assembly in March 1973, where he replaced Moussa Ali Abdoulkader. Obtaining 26,105 out of 35,230 votes, he defeated Ibrahim Harbi Farah, brother of the militant nationalist Mahmoud Harbi, who got 9125 votes. He represented the TFAI during the fifth parliamentary term from 1973 to 1978. He participated in the Paris negotiations in February 1977 on the independence of the territory. Despite Djibouti's independence on June 27, 1977, Farah Iltireh completed his entire term through the end of the legislature, in April 1978.

After independence, he was responsible for business at the Djibouti embassy in Addis Ababa and consul-general in Dire-Dawa.

== Family life ==
He had a son, Ahmed Omar Farah, and a wife in 1975 Warmog Ahmed Abar, the first wife of the second President of Djibouti Ismail Omar Guelleh. He became the ambassador of Djibouti in France in 1989.
