= Human trafficking in Yemen =

It is likely that several thousands of people are trafficked in Yemen every year, often to Saudi Arabia.

== Background ==
In 2008 Yemen was a country of origin for children, mostly boys, trafficked for forced begging, forced unskilled labor, or forced street vending.

Yemeni children were trafficked across the northern border into Saudi Arabia, or to the Yemeni cities of Aden and Sanaa for forced work, primarily as beggars.

Unconfirmed estimates suggested that 10 Yemeni children were trafficked into Saudi Arabia per day, according to the Ministry of Social Affairs and Labor. Some of these children may have been sexually exploited in transit or once they arrive in Saudi Arabia.

To a lesser extent, Yemen was also a source country for women and girls trafficked internally, possibly to Saudi Arabia for the purpose of commercial sexual exploitation, as well as a possible destination country for women from Eritrea, Ethiopia, Somalia and South Sudan.

Yemeni girls were trafficked within the country for commercial sexual exploitation; one study by ILO-IPEC indicated that girls (as young as 15 years) were exploited for commercial sex in hotels, casinos and bars in the governorates of Mahweet, Aden and Taiz.

In addition, street children were vulnerable to commercial sexual exploitation.

Many of those trafficked were also migrating from the "Horn of Africa", paying hundreds of dollars to traffickers to facilitate their journey as they traverse the waters via small boats, that were often crammed so tight that some suffer suffocation. Those who made it to the shores of Yemen are often held hostage for ransom, and some were continuously traded and sold to other gangs.

In 2008 the Government of Yemen did not fully comply with the minimum standards for the elimination of trafficking; however, it made significant efforts to do so. Yemen opened a shelter for child victims in Sanaa, and continued to provide protection and reintegration services to victims repatriated from Saudi Arabia. Nonetheless, Yemen reported fewer trafficking convictions in 2008, and reported no significant efforts to address trafficking for commercial sexual exploitation.

Although Yemen did not express any specific plan to reduce the occurrence of human trafficking occurring within their borders causing some to believe that the numbers are inaccurate in order to display a false improvement for global perception. For this reason, one of the greatest areas for opportunity to greatly reduce human trafficking in Yemen is more governance and enforcement within Yemen as well as their countries of origin.

The best chance to combat this horrific crime is getting all parties involved in the improvement. Government corruption is also a major contributor to this where some profit monetarily from this fast growing transnational crime creating tens of billions of dollars annually. Studies have also shown that having more women in government positions has an indirect positive effect on the reduction of occurrence.

The number of migrants Yemen was receiving reached a peak in 2012 reaching over 100,000 that year alone. Since there has been a decline being attributed to current conflict in the region with Saudi Arabia.

In 2023, the US State Department ranked the country as being at Tier 2 for human trafficking.

In 2023, the Organised Crime Index gave the country a score of 9 out of 10 for human trafficking, noting that human trafficking and organ trafficking were the most prevalent organized crime in the country.

An independent report in 2023 noted that Yemen is a major transit point for Ethiopians being trafficked to Saudi Arabia, with an average of 12,000 people travelling through the country each month.

== Prosecution (2008) ==
The Government of Yemen did not improve its efforts to punish trafficking crimes over the reporting period. Article 248 of the penal code prescribes a 10-year prison sentence for anyone who “buys, sells or gives as a present, or deals in human beings; and anyone who brings into the country or exports from it a human being with the intent of taking advantage of him.” This prescribed penalty is commensurate with that for other grave crimes, such as rape.

Article 161 of Yemen’s Child Rights Law specifically criminalizes the prostitution of children. Despite the availability of these statutes, Yemen reported only 14 arrests and six convictions for child labor trafficking.

The government did not provide information, regarding the sentences assigned to the convicted traffickers.

The government did not report law enforcement efforts against trafficking for commercial sexual exploitation. Moreover, despite indications of government officials' complicity in trafficking, Yemen did not prosecute any officials for such complicity.

== Protection (2008) ==
Yemen made limited progress in protecting victims of trafficking over the last year. In July 2007, the Yemeni government provided 80 female police officers with training on how to deal with trafficked children. It opened a shelter in Sanaa in February, to receive trafficked children returning from Saudi Arabia; this shelter has protected 10 boys since its opening.

The government also received 622 children in its reception center, during the reporting period, providing child victims repatriated from Saudi Arabia with social services, limited medical care and family reunion fication services.

Nonetheless, the government continues to lack protection services for victims of sex trafficking. The government did not employ procedures for proactively identifying victims of sex trafficking among high-risk groups; as a result, victims, including minors, were arrested and jailed for crimes committed as a result of being trafficked, such as prostitution.

The government may encourage child victims to assist in investigations against their traffickers, but it does not offer legal alternatives to remove countries, which face hardship or retribution.

== Prevention (2008) ==
Yemen made modest progress in preventing trafficking in persons during the reporting period. The government produced an anti-trafficking public awareness campaign against child labor trafficking. In addition, the Ministry of Human Rights distributed brochures on the threat of child trafficking in cooperation with UNICEF, providing logistical support to this project.

The government, however, did not take any known measures during the reporting period to reduce the demand for commercial sex acts. The government also did not undertake any public awareness efforts targeting citizens that travel to known child sex tourism destinations abroad.

Yemen has not ratified the 2000 UN TIP Protocol.

== See also ==
- Human rights in Yemen
