= Prostitution in Somalia =

Prostitution in Somalia is officially illegal. There is generally very little voluntary prostitution in the country according to the African Medical Research and Education Foundation (AMREF). UNAIDS estimated there were 10,957 sex workers in Somalia in 2016.

== History ==
Prostitution in Somalia was first documented by Italian explorer Robecchi Bricchetti as a female slave activity. A woman’s income from prostitution was difficult for a master to control, especially if it was not declared. While masters could collect tributes from enslaved people’s earnings, secret income from sexual services could not easily be taxed or monitored. Secret prostitution could provide a way for enslaved women to earn income without paying tributes to their owners, although masters often still expected to extract some share of the earnings. Italian colonial records recount the case of a concubine who had accumulated modest wealth through prostitution, including cattle and jewelry.

Prostitution reportedly became widespread in urban centers after the abolition of slavery by the Italian colonial government. According to Italian records, by the 1910s most emancipated women engaged in prostitution:

"The slave, Swahili, Boran, Galla, Arussi, means by freedom only the right to do nothing. Except for the few who join the freedmen's villages on the Shabelle or Juba Rivers and take up farming on their own, most, if men, turn to idleness and vagrancy; if women, to prostitution. Mogadishu, Merca, and Brava are overflowing with prostitutes, and, with a few exceptions, they are all freed slaves."

== Legislation ==
Prostitution laws in Somalia are contained in the Penal Code of 1960, which was based on the Italian Penal Code of 1930. The relevant articles are:

- Article 405 Prostitution
- Article 406 Incitement to Lewd Acts (prohibits solicitation)
- Article 407 Instigation, Aiding and Exploiting of Prostitution
- Article 408 Compulsion to Prostitution

The laws are currently under review.

However, according to Amnesty International, respect for legal rights in much of Somalia has remained inconsistent. The legal system is largely locally organised and based on a combination of customary and Islamic law. A widely cited case reported in Somaliland occurred on 8 January 1993 in Hargeisa, where five women accused of prostitution were executed by stoning after being buried up to their necks.

== HIV ==
HIV/AIDS prevalence rates are quite low in the country, estimated at 0.1% of adults. This has been attributed to Somalia's dominant Muslim tradition and adherence to Islamic morals, which generally discourage premarital and extramarital sexual activity. Sex workers are a high risk group and their estimated HIV prevalence rate was 5.2% in 2014. Condom use amongst sex workers is low.

== Sex trafficking ==
Somalia is a source, transit, and destination country for women and children subjected to sex trafficking. Information regarding trafficking in Somalia remains extremely difficult to obtain or verify. Victims are primarily from Somalia's southern and central regions and subjected to trafficking within the country, especially in Puntland and Somaliland in the north. In Somaliland, women act as recruiters and intermediaries who transport victims to Puntland, Djibouti, and Ethiopia for the purposes of sex trafficking. Due to poverty and an inability to provide care for all family members, some Somalis willingly surrender custody of their children to people with whom they share familial ties and clan linkages; some of these children may become victims of sex trafficking. In 2014, an international NGO released a report documenting cases of sexual abuse and exploitation, including trafficking, of Somali women and girls by Ugandan and Burundian African Union Mission in Somalia (AMISOM) personnel. An African Union investigation into the allegations concluded there was evidence of sexual exploitation, abuse, and trafficking by AMISOM personnel.

Regional governments from Somaliland and Puntland reported smuggling and trafficking continued through Somalia as a transit point on routes to Libya, Sudan, and Europe. Women and girl migrants working in the informal economy were particularly vulnerable to trafficking. Certain marginalised ethnic minorities, Somali Bantus and Midgaan, continue to face greater risk of sex trafficking, as do IDPs and people living in areas under al-Shabaab control. Self-identified administrators of some IDP camps reportedly force girls and women to provide sex acts in exchange for food and services; some Somali officials are alleged to be complicit in such exploitation.

Traffickers transport Somali women, sometimes via Djibouti, to the Middle East, where they frequently endure domestic forced prostitution. Some members of the Somali diaspora use false offers of marriage to lure unsuspecting victims, many of whom include relatives, to Europe or the United States, where they force them into prostitution. Trucks transporting goods from Kenya to Somalia sometimes return to Kenya with young girls and women; traffickers procure these young girls and women and exploit them in brothels in Nairobi or Mombasa or send them to destinations outside Kenya.

The United States Department of State Office to Monitor and Combat Trafficking in Persons ranks Somalia as a 'Special Case' country.
