= Kadra Mahamoud Haid =

Djiboutian politician and First Lady

- Khadra Maxamuud Xayd
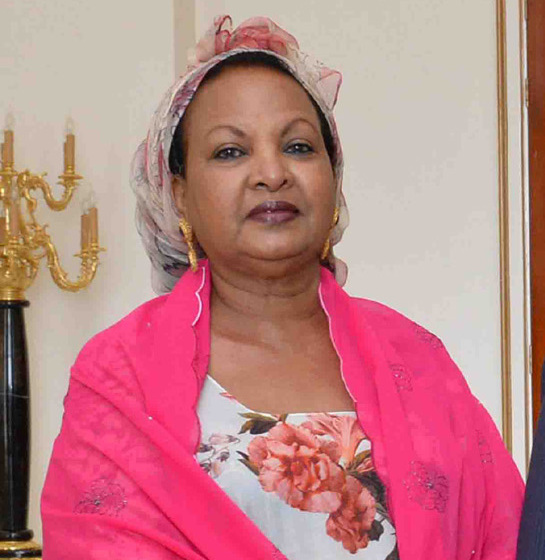
- Haid in 2017

First Lady of Djibouti
- Incumbent
- Assumed role 8 May 1999
- President: Ismaïl Omar Guelleh
- Preceded by: Aïcha Bogoreh Darrar

Personal details
- Party: People's Rally for Progress
- Spouse(s): Ismaïl Omar Guelleh (current); Mahamed Abdallah Kamil (former)
- Children: Five

Kadra Mahamoud Haid (Somali: Khadra Maxamuud Xayd) is a Djiboutian politician, political advisor, and First Lady of Djibouti since 1999. She is married to President Ismaïl Omar Guelleh

In 2003, Haid spoke against female genital mutilation (FGM), "These practices are not gone, an estimated two million young girls a year, 6,000 per day, still undergo these mutilations in all their forms. The consequences are dramatic, it can cause death by haemorrhage, urinary infections, cysts and childbirth difficulties, not to mention psychological damage." Although a 1995 law banned FGM, it has been estimated that 98% of women in Djibouti are victims of it.

Somali businessman Abdourahman Boreh, one of the richest people in Djibouti, was expelled because of an investment dispute with Haid.

In 2014, it was reported that Guelleh "holds on to that power jealously, sharing it only with his influential wife". Africa Intelligence has stated that she "acts as a sort of vice president".

== Personal life ==
Through her current marriage to Ismaïl Omar Guelleh, she has two daughters and a son, presidential adviser Haibado and businesswoman Fatouma-Awo and Ainache. In addition, she has a son from her first marriage, Naguib Abdallah Kamil, who she is reportedly grooming for "high political responsibilities" and a daughter, Nazli, who is a businesswoman.
