= List of wadis of Djibouti =

This is a list of wadis in Djibouti. Wadis are either permanently or intermittently dry riverbeds, of which Djibouti has several. However, it does not have any permanent rivers.

This list is arranged by drainage basin, with respective tributaries indented under each larger stream's name.

== Bab-el-Mandeb ==
- We'ima
  - Alailou
  - Essulou
- Ga'lale
  - Boussali
- Goutoi (Kadda Dola)
- Soudi

== Gulf of Tadjoura ==
- Obock
- Sadai
- Ambado
- Ambouli
- Deydey
- Beyadé
  - Ouâhayyi

== Danakil Desert ==
- Gabone
- Kalou (flows into Lake Assal)
- Hanlé
- Degbour (flows into Lake Abbe)
