= Freedom of the press in Djibouti =

Freedom of the press in Djibouti is not specifically mentioned by the country's constitution. However, Article 15 of the Constitution of Djibouti does mention an individual's right to express their opinion "...by word, pen, or image..." and notes that "these rights may be limited by prescriptions in the law and in respect for the honour of others."

Despite this, journalism in Djibouti is severely limited by the government and all television and radio stations within the country are government-controlled.

The country has one national newspaper called La Nation de Djibouti, which is published daily. It is also owned by the government along with the country's only news agency L'Agence Djiboutienne d'Information. An opposition-backed newspaper, Le Renouveau, ceased operations in 2007 after publishing an article accusing President Ismaïl Omar Guelleh's brother-in-law (the former governor of the Central Bank of Djibouti, Djama Haid) of accepting bribes.

There are also several weekly or monthly publications published by opposition parties, though they are often opinion and politically based information rather than fact-based news. One example is L'Aurore; founded in 2015 it is published and heavily influenced by the USN, the main opposition coalition in Djibouti.

There is one independent radio station which reports uncensored news: La Voix de Djibouti. The station broadcasts in both French and Arabic, and was set up by the Djibouti diaspora in 2010. Although the station broadcasts from Belgium (both online and over AM radio), its employees are subject to Djibouti's press laws while in Djibouti.

== 2011 presidential election ==
The 2011 presidential election, in which the incumbent president Guelleh won with 80% of the vote, was characterized by a number of press freedom incidents.

Most notable was the case of two journalists for La Voix de Djibouti, Farah Abadid Heldid and Houssein Robleh Dabar. Heldid and Dabar were originally arrested without a warrant in February of that year, and were held for four months, during which period the presidential election occurred.

At some point during his imprisonment, Heldid was interrogated and tortured by the Djibouti intelligence service, known as the SRD. The journalists were released on June 23, but were again arrested by the SRD later that year for "encouraging illegal demonstration and insulting the president."

According to Reporters Without Borders (RSF), both journalists were tortured and interrogated (until their release on November 24) by Sergeant Major Abdourahman Omar Said, who was also responsible for the death via torture of a Djibouti resident named Dirir Ibrahim Bouraleh earlier that year. However, while RSF has reported multiple times on such mistreatment of Djibouti journalists, the National Human Rights Commission of Djibouti visited Heldid during one of his jail sentences in 2011 and found no evidence of torture.

== Press freedom violations, 2012–2015 ==
Though most unrest in Djibouti occurs during presidential elections, some press freedom incidents have occurred in the intervening years. In May 2015 an editor for La Voix de Djibouti's website was arrested while in Djibouti City, the nation's capital. The editor, Maydaneh Abdallah Okieh, was imprisoned for failing to comply with a court order relating to his earlier arrests for "defaming a police officer". Okieh also reported being tortured and refused medical attention while inside prison. Another reporter from La Voix, Mohamed Ibrahim Waiss, was arrested and beaten by police while covering an opposition party rally in August 2014.

== 2016 Presidential elections ==
In January 2016, four months in advance of presidential elections, Djibouti's security service detained two Djiboutian journalists and held them without charge.

Mohamed Ibrahim Waïss of La Voix de Djibouti was detained from January 11–17 and held in Djibouti's Gabode prison, where he was reportedly mistreated, according to Reporters Without Borders. His interrogators forced him to sign a statement and to turn over his password to his Facebook account so that members of the security services could use it to make posts that insulted the country's opposition, according to the France-based press group. He was brought before a court and released January 17 after the government failed to charge him with any crime. It was the fourth time Waïss had been detained in five years.

Separately arrested that month was Kadar Abdi Ibrahim of L'Aurore. Ibrahim was detained from January 14–16 after the newspaper printed a photo of a 7-year-old girl killed after police opened fire on opposition members in the town of Buldhuquo, killing 27 people.

Foreign journalists have more freedom than domestic journalists, but still face restrictions by the government. On April 1, 2016, journalists from the British Broadcasting Corporation were expelled from the country ahead of Djibouti's April 8 national elections. The BBC, as well as the Committee to Protect Journalists, were not given an explanation as to why the team of reporters and producers were forced to leave.

The elections were won by the incumbent president Guelleh, resulting in fourth consecutive term in office. Opposition parties within Djibouti reported disappointment with how "uncompetitive" the election was, while the European Parliament expressed strong concerns with the fairness of the election, stating that it "deplores how the way the 8th of April 2016 presidential elections were run."

== Outside criticism ==
The international community generally recognises that Djibouti has a restrictive media environment. Reporters Sans Frontières ranks Djibouti 172nd out of 180 on its Press Freedom Index, while the independent media watchdog Freedom House categorises Djibouti as "Not Free".

Western governments generally refrain from significant criticism of Djibouti's press freedom issues. This is possibly due to its strategic value: Djibouti has proximity to unstable nations like Somalia, Eritrea and Yemen. It is also home to a French military base and the only permanent US military base in Africa. In March 2016, China said it would establish its first permanent overseas military base in Djibouti.

In 2012 the US State Department's Bureau of Democracy, Human Rights and Labour released a report that referred to Djibouti's harsh treatment of journalists as the "most serious human rights problem" that the country faced. Specifically, it referred to how Guelleh's regime was "harassing, abusing, and detaining government critics; denying the population access to independent sources of information; and restricting the freedom of speech and assembly."

== See also ==
- Elections in Djibouti
