= Moussa Ali Abdoulkader =

Djiboutian politician (born 1923)

French MP for French Territory of the Afars and the Issas
- In office April 3, 1967 – April 1, 1973
- Preceded by: Ahmed-Idriss Moussa
- Succeeded by: Omar Farah Iltireh

Personal details
- Born: January 1, 1923 Djibouti
- Died: September 26, 1986 (aged 63) Paris
- Party: Union of Democrats for the Republic

Moussa Ali Abdoulkader (January 1, 1923 in Djibouti – September 26, 1986 in Paris) was a politician from Djibouti who served in the French National Assembly from 1967-1973.
