= French Somaliland =

1883–1967 French colony in modern Djibouti

Coordinates: 11°36′N 43°10′E

French Somaliland Côte française des Somalis (French) Xeebta Soomaaliyeed ee Faransiiska (Somali) ساحل الصوماليين الفرنسي وتوابعه (Arabic)
- 1884–1967
- Flag Coat of arms
- Anthem: La Marseillaise
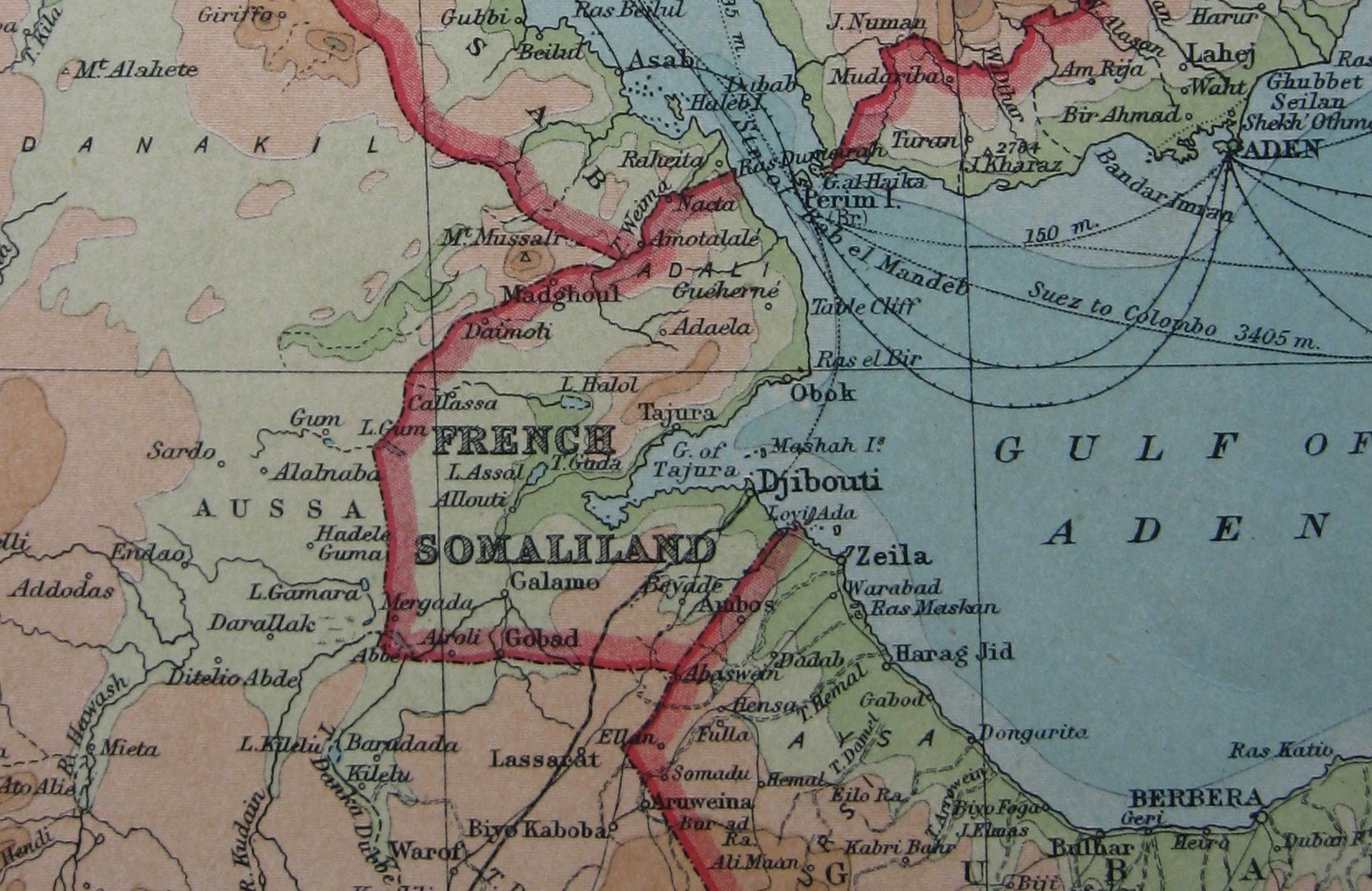
- French Somaliland in 1922
- Status: Colony of France (1884–1946); Overseas territory of France (1946–1967)
- Capital: Djibouti
- Common languages: French; Somali; Afar; Arabic (Ta'izzi-Adeni)
- Religion: Christianity; Islam
- Demonyms: Somali; French Somali
- Governor
  - 1896–1899: Léonce Lagarde
  - 1965–1967: Louis Saget
- Historical era: New Imperialism
  - Established: May 20, 1884
  - Italian invasion: June 18, 1940
  - British occupation: December 28, 1942
  - Status changed to overseas territory: October 27, 1946
  - Renamed: July 5, 1967
- Currency: French franc (1883–1949); French Somaliland franc (1949–1967)
Preceded by	Succeeded by
Obock Territory	French Territory of the Afars and the Issas
- Today part of: Djibouti

French Somaliland (French: Côte française des Somalis, lit. 'French Coast of the Somalis', CFS; Somali: Xeebta Soomaaliyeed ee Faransiiska; Arabic: ساحل الصوماليين الفرنسي وتوابعه) was a French colony in the Horn of Africa. It existed between 1884 and 1967, at which point it became the French Territory of the Afars and the Issas. The Republic of Djibouti is its legal successor state.

== History ==
French Somaliland was formally established in 1896 when the ruler and elders of the Issa clan signed treaties with the French. On March 25, 1885, the French signed a treaty with the Gadabuursi, effectively making them a protectorate of France. On March 26, 1885, the French signed another treaty with the Issa making the latter a protectorate under the French. No money changed hands and the Somalis did not sign away any of their land rights; the agreement was meant to protect their land from outsiders with the help of the French. However, after the French sailors of the Le Pingouin vessel were mysteriously killed in Ambado in 1886, the French first blamed the British, then the Somalis, using the incident to lay claim to the entire southern territory.

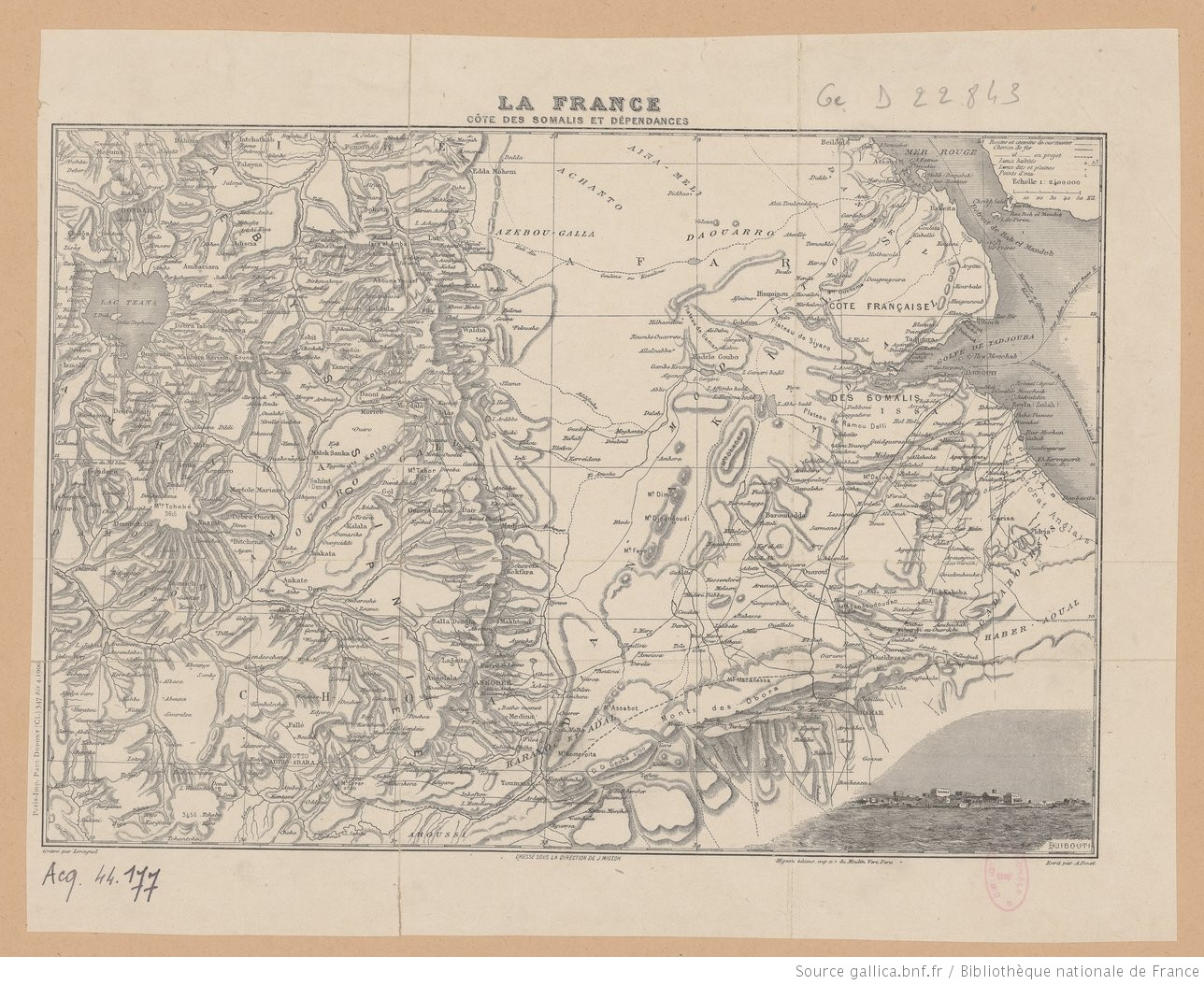
Coast of the Somalis and dependencies

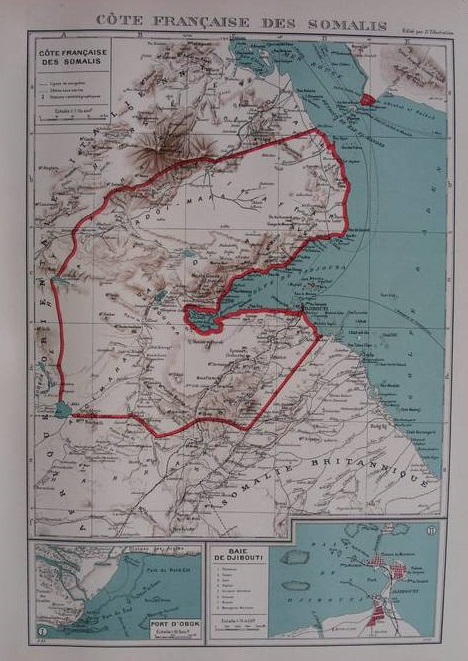
Map showing the new borders of French Somaliland following the cession of territory to Italian Eritrea in 1935

The construction of the Imperial Ethiopian Railway west into Ethiopia turned the port of Djibouti into a boomtown of 15,000 at a time when Harar was the only city in Ethiopia with a greater population. Although the city's population fell after the completion of the line to Dire Dawa and the bankruptcy (and subsequent government bail-out) of the original company, the rail link allowed Djibouti to quickly overtake the caravan-based trade out of Zeila (then in British Somaliland) and become the premier port for coffee and other goods leaving southern Ethiopia and the Ogaden through Harar. Before the French aligned with the Issa, the Gadabuursi held the position of the first Senator of the country, and is the first Somali head of state to lead the territory compromising Djibouti today. Djama Ali Moussa, a former sailor, pursued his political aspirations and managed to become the first Somali democratically elected head of state in French Somaliland.

The railway continued operating after the Italian conquest of Ethiopia, but following the tumult of the Second World War, the area became a French overseas territory in 1946. In 1967, French Somaliland was renamed the French Territory of the Afars and the Issas and, in 1977, became the independent country of Djibouti.

== See also ==
- List of governors of French Somaliland
- List of French possessions and colonies
- French colonial empire
