= List of rulers and office-holders of Djibouti =

This is a list of rulers and office-holders of Djibouti.

== Heads of state ==
| No. | Portrait | Name (Birth–Death) | Election | Term of office | | Political party |
| No. | Portrait | Name (Birth–Death) | Election | Took office | Left office | Political party |
|---|---|---|---|---|---|---|
• French Territory of the Afars and the Issas (1967–1977)
| 1 | | Ali Aref Bourhan (born 1934) | 1968; 1973 | 7 July 1967 | 29 July 1976 | National Union for Independence |
| 2 | | Abdallah Mohamed Kamil (born 1936) | — | 29 July 1976 | 18 May 1977 | Afar Democratic Rally |
• Republic of Djibouti (1977–present) •
| 1 | | Hassan Gouled Aptidon (1915–2006) | 1977; 1981; 1987; 1993 | 18 May 1977 | 8 May 1999 | RPP |
| 2 | | Ismaïl Omar Guelleh (born 1946) | 1999; 2005; 2011; 2016; 2021 | 8 May 1999 | Incumbent | RPP |

== Heads of government ==
- Heads of government of Djibouti

| # | Portrait | Incumbent | Tenure | Affiliation |
|---|---|---|---|---|
| | | Mahamoud Harbi Farah | 1957 to December 1958 | PMP |
| | | Hassan Gouled Aptidon | December 1958 to April 1959 | PMP |
| | | Ahmed Dini Ahmed | April 1959 to June 1960 | LPAI |
| | | Ali Aref Bourhan, | June 1960 to 1966 | UNI |
| | | Abdallah Mohamed Kamil | 1966 to 1967 | RDA |
| | | Ali Aref Bourhan | 7 July 1967 to 29 July 1976 | UNI |
| | | Abdallah Mohamed Kamil | 29 July 1976 to 18 May 1977 | RDA |
| | | Hassan Gouled Aptidon | 18 May 1977 to 27 June 1977 | RPP |
| | | Hassan Gouled Aptidon | 27 June 1977 to 12 July 1977 | RPP |
| | | Ahmed Dini Ahmed | 12 July 1977 to 5 February 1978 | RPP |
| | | Abdallah Mohamed Kamil | 5 February 1978 to 2 October 1978 | RPP |
| | | Barkat Gourad Hamadou | 2 October 1978 to 7 March 2001 | RPP |
| | | Dileita Mohamed Dileita | 7 March 2001 to 1 April 2013 | RPP |
| | | Abdoulkader Kamil Mohamed | 1 April 2013 to Present | RPP |

== Colonial governors ==
| Tenure | Portrait | Incumbent | Notes |
|---|---|---|---|
Obock
| 11 March 1862 | French purchase of Obock. Remains unadministered and unoccupied until 1884. | | |
Territory of Obock and Dependencies (Territoire d'Obock et dépendances)
| 24 June 1884 to 7 August 1887 | | Léonce Lagarde, Commandant | |
| 7 August 1887 to 20 May 1896 | | Léonce Lagarde, Governor | |
French Somaliland (Côte française des Somalis)
| 20 May 1896 to 7 March 1899 | | Léonce Lagarde, Governor | |
| 7 March 1899 to 11 March 1899 | | Antoine Mizon, Governor | |
| 28 March 1899 to 13 April 1900 | | Alfred Albert Martineau, Governor | |
| 13 April 1900 to 6 December 1900 | | Gabriel Louis Angoulvant, acting Governor | |
| 6 December 1900 to 7 September 1901 | | Alphonse Bonhoure, Governor | 1st term |
| 7 September 1901 to June 1902 | | Louis Ormiéres, acting Governor | 1st term |
| June 1902 to 23 May 1903 | | Alphonse Bonhoure, Governor | 2nd term |
| 23 May 1903 to December 1903 | | Albert Dubarry, acting Governor | 1st term |
| December 1903 to 2 April 1904 | | Alphonse Bonhoure, Governor | 3rd term |
| 2 April 1904 to 5 August 1904 | | Albert Dubarry, acting Governor | |
| 5 August 1904 to 9 September 1905 | | Pierre Hubert Auguste Pascal, Governor | 1st term |
| 9 September 1905 to 13 October 1905 | | Raphaël Antonetti, acting Governor | |
| 13 October 1905 to 19 May 1906 | | Louis Ormiéres, acting Governor | 2nd term |
| 19 May 1906 to 19 June 1906 | | Paul Patté, acting Governor | |
| 19 June 1906 to July 1908 | | Pierre Hubert Auguste Pascal, Governor | 2nd term |
| July 1908 to 5 July 1909 | | Jean Baptiste Castaing, acting Governor | 1st term |
| 5 January 1909 to June 1911 | | Pierre Hubert Auguste Pascal, Governor | 3rd term |
| June 1911 to December 1911 | | Jean Baptiste Castaing, acting Governor | 2nd term |
| December 1911 to April 1913 | | Pierre Hubert Auguste Pascal, Governor | 4th term |
| 25 April to May 1913 | | Henri Carreau, acting Governor | 1st term |
| May 1913 to 2 March 1914 | | Adrien Jules Jean Bonhoure, Governor | |
| 2 March 1914 to 7 February 1915 | | Fernand Deltel, acting Governor | |
| 7 February 1915 to 14 April 1915 | | Henri Carreau, acting Governor | 2nd term |
| 14 April 1915 to 19 September 1916 | | Paul Simoni, Governor | |
| 1916 to 1917 | | Victor Marie Fillon, Governor | |
| 28 August 1917 to 8 September 1918 | | Édouard Geffriaud, acting Governor | |
| 8 September 1918 to 3 May 1920 | | Jules Lauret, Governor | 1st term |
| 3 May 1920 to 29 June 1920 | | M. Lassaigne, acting Governor | |
| 29 June 1920 to 29 November | | Edmond Lippman, acting Governor | 1st term |
| 29 November 1920 to 25 May 1922 | | Jules Lauret, Governor | 2nd term |
| 25 May 1922 to 8 January 1923 | | Edmond Lippman, acting Governor | 2nd term |
| 8 January 1923 to 22 February 1924 | | Jules Lauret, Governor | 3rd term |
| 1924 to 1934 | | Pierre-Amable Chapon-Baissac, Governor | |
| 7 May 1934 to 18 July 1935 | | Jules Marcel de Coppet, Governor | |
| 18 July 1935 to 20 December 1935 | | Achille Louis Auguste Silvestre, Governor | |
| 20 December 1935 to 1 May 1937 | | Armand Léon Annet, Governor | |
| 1 May 1937 to 19 March 1938 | | François Pierre-Alype, acting Governor | |
| 19 March 1938 to 27 April 1938 | | François Pierre-Alype, Governor | |
| 27 April 1938 to 2 May 1939 | | Hubert Jules Deschamps, acting Governor | |
| 2 May 1939 to 25 July 1940 | | Hubert Jules Deschamps, Governor | |
| 25 July 1940 to 7 August 1940 | | Gaetan Louis Elie Germain, Governor | |
| 7 August 1940 to 21 October 1942 | | Pierre Nouailhetas, Governor | |
| 21 October 1942 to 4 December 1942 | | Auguste Charles Jules Truffert, Governor | |
| 4 December 1942 to 26 December 1942 | | Christian Raimond Dupont, Governor | |
| 30 December 1942 to 22 June 1943 | | André Bayardelle, Governor | |
| 22 June 1943 to 7 January 1944 | | Michel Raphael Saller, acting Governor | |
| 7 January 1944 to 1 May 1944 | | Michel Raphael Saller, Governor | |
| 1 May 1944 to 30 April 1946 | | Jean Chalvet, Governor | |
| 30 April 1946 to 1 March 1950 | | Paul Henri Siriex, Governor | |
| 1 March 1950 to 6 April 1954 | | Numa François Henri Sadoul, Governor | |
| 6 April 1954 to 13 August 1954 | | Roland Pré, Governor | |
| 13 August 1954 to 7 August 1957 | | René Jean Albert Petitbon, Governor | |
| 7 August 1957 to 1958 | | Maurice Meker, Governor | |
| 1958 to 16 November 1962 | | Jacques Marie Julien Compain, Governor | |
| 16 November 1962 to 15 September 1966 | | René Tirant, Governor | |
| 15 September 1966 to 3 July 1967 | | Louis Joseph Édouard Saget, Governor | |
French Territory of the Afars and the Issas (Territoire français des Afars et des Issas)
| 3 July 1967 to 5 February 1969 | | Louis Joseph Édouard Saget, High Commissioner | |
| 5 February 1969 to 21 August 1971 | | Dominique Ponchardier, High Commissioner | |
| 21 August 1971 to 1 August 1974 | | Georges Thiercy, High Commissioner | |
| 1 August 1974 to 9 February 1976 | | Christian Dablanc, High Commissioner | |
| 9 February 1976 to 27 June 1977 | | Camille d'Ornano, High Commissioner | |
| 27 June 1977 | Independence as Republic of Djibouti | | |

== See also ==
- Lists of office-holders
