= Party of the Popular Movement (Djibouti) =

Political party

The Party of Popular Movement (French: Parti du mouvement populaire, often abbreviated to PMP) was a political party of French Somaliland, and later the French Territory of the Afars and the Issas.

== Founding ==
It was created in 1958 by Somali nationalist militants. Its candidate Moussa Ahmed Idriss was elected deputy of the territory to the French National Assembly in 1962. He sat on the benches of the Union for the New Republic (UNR), the Gaullist party. Its leaders were Absieh Bouh Abdallah (born in 1932) and Ahmad Farah Dalieh.

== History ==
In 1963, the PMP allied with Ali Aref with which it won the territorial elections. The PMP managed to obtain 4 of the 14 seats in Djibouti, and the two seats of Ali Sabieh. The party's vote would have been higher, but for the votes cast by the crews of the ships in the port, giving the Europeans an extra four seats. Its leaders signed the agreement of Arta. In 1965, the PMP was joined by activists of the Democratic Union Issa led by Hassan Gouled Aptidon. With the Democratic Union Afar, PMP involved itself in the organization of nationalist demonstrations in Djibouti in August 1966 to mark the passing of General de Gaulle. The formations then split. The PMP called for a vote of "no", i.e. in favor of independence, in the referendum of March 1967. Its ministers then left the government. Consequently, on July 13, 1967, the PMP was dissolved by decision of the administrative authorities of the territory. One of its militants, Omar Osman Rabeh, was sentenced to death (later commuted to life in prison) for the attempted murder of Ali Aref Bourhan in 1968. He was eventually traded against France's ambassador to Somalia, who was kidnapped in Mogadishu by a commando the Liberation Front of the Somali Coast (FLCS) in 1975.

The party was dissolved roughly a year before the Djiboutian Indepence.

== Notable members ==
- Moussa Ahmed Idriss
- Said Abdoulkader
- Absieh Bouh Abdallah, who was initially sentenced to 10 years on a prison farm by the Colonial French
- Houssein Ali Chirdon
- Ahmed Farah "Dalileh"
- Djama Guedi
- Mohamed Guelle Osman
- Idriss Farah Abaneh, former Minister of Internal Affairs of French Somaliland's Government Council
- Ibrahim Ahmed Bouraleh "China"
- Abdillahi Osman Handeh
- Djibril Osman
- Meraneh Ammareh
