= Independence Day (Djibouti) =

National holiday in Djibouti

Independence Day of Djibouti
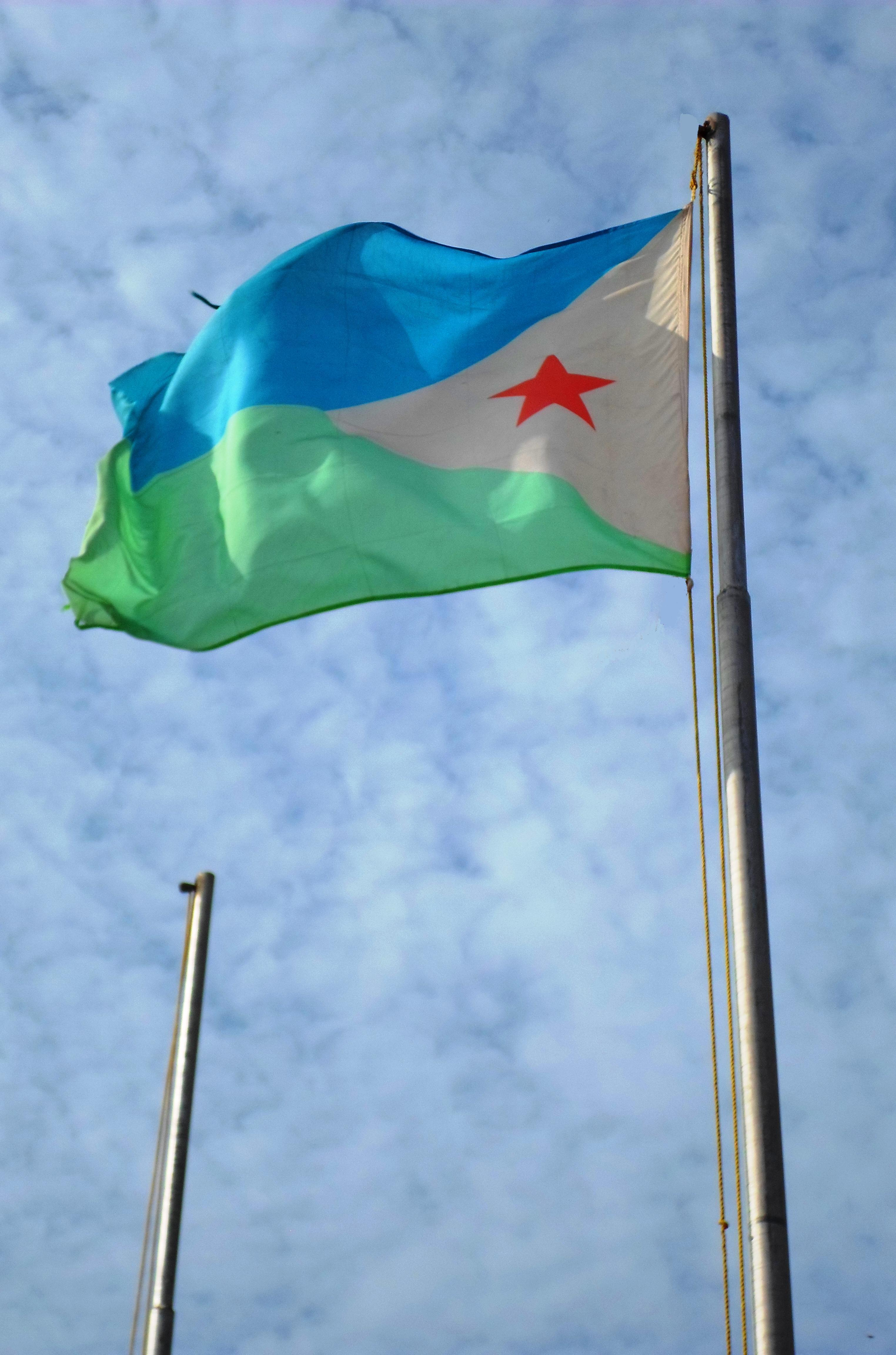
- The flag of Djibouti.
- Observed by: Djibouti
- Type: National Day
- Significance: Inauguration of Djibouti as an independent nation.
- Celebrations: Flag hoisting, parades, award ceremonies, singing patriotic songs and the national anthem, speeches by the President and Prime Minister, entertainment and cultural programs.
- Date: 27 June
- Next time: 27 June 2026
- Duration: 2 day
- Frequency: Annual
- First time: 27 June 1977

Independence Day, observed annually on 27 June, is a national holiday in Djibouti. It marks the territory's declaration of independence from France. An independence referendum was held in the French Territory of the Afars and the Issas on 8 May 1977 alongside elections for a Constituent Assembly. Unlike previous plebiscites in 1958 and 1967, this time the territory became independent as Djibouti on 27 June 1977. Djibouti Independence Day is a national holiday, with workers given a day off. Independence Day is associated with military parades, fireworks, concerts, fairs, and political speeches and ceremonies, in addition to various other public and private events celebrating the history and culture of Djibouti.

The main Independence Day ceremony takes place in Djibouti City, where the national flag is hoisted at the Presidential palace and the president lays a wreath at the Monument of Martyrs, holds a military parade with different regiments of the Djiboutian Army in addition to the Navy, and Air Force with their bands march past in all their finery and official decorations which is broadcast nationwide on television and radio. The President of Djibouti who is the Commander-in-Chief of the Djiboutian Armed Forces and the Chief of the General Staff General Zakaria Cheikh Ibrahim, takes the salute. It is followed by the national anthem and live televised speech by the president. Usual celebratory events and festivities for the day include flag-raising ceremonies, parades, cultural events, and the playing of patriotic songs. A number of award ceremonies are often held on this day, and Djiboutians hoist the national flag atop their homes or display it prominently on their vehicles and attire, with shops decorating their windows in the blue, green, white and the red star of the Djiboutian flag. The Djiboutians diaspora organises cultural events to celebrate independence day.

Djibouti's Independence Day is also celebrated by the diaspora communities who live outside the country. During this special week, Radio Television of Djibouti (RTD) schedule is sprinkled with documentaries from the struggle for independence to remind the population of the heavy sacrifice paid to liberate the country.

== See also ==
- Flag of Djibouti
