= 1962 French legislative election in French Somaliland =

Elections to the French National Assembly were held in French Somaliland on 18 November 1962 as part of the wider French parliamentary elections. Ahmed-Idriss Moussa was elected as the territory's MP, defeating incumbent Hassan Gouled Aptidon.

== Results ==
Candidate	Votes	%
Ahmed-Idriss Moussa	4,712	42.72
Ahmed Dini Ahmed	1,966	17.82
Ali Arre Kahire	1,488	13.49
Barkat Gourat Hamadou	1,475	13.37
Hassan Gouled Aptidon	724	6.56
Three other candidates	665	6.03
Total	11,030	100.00
Valid votes	11,030	98.09
Invalid/blank votes	215	1.91
Total votes	11,245	100.00
Registered voters/turnout	25,193	44.64
Source: Sternberger et al
