= Jacques Robert (writer) =

French writer and journalist (1921–1997)

- Born: 27 June 1921; Lyon, France
- Died: 11 August 1997 (aged 76); Rouen, France
- Occupations: Journalist, Novelist, Screenwriter
- Writing career
- Language: French
- Genres: Screenplays, novels, crime fiction, essays
- Notable works: Marie-Octobre (1948); Le Gorille vous salue bien (1958); Someone Behind the Door (1971)

Jacques Robert (27 June 1921 – 11 August 1997) was a French author, screenwriter and journalist.

== Biography ==
Jacques Robert was born on 27 June 1921 in Lyon, France. He started his writing career as a journalist. In May 1945 Jacques Robert was the only Western journalist to descend into Hitler's bunker in Berlin, Germany.
During his career he wrote more than 40 books and novels. Around 20 of his novels have been adapted for cinema, notably The Long Teeth directed by Daniel Gélin, Marie-Octobre directed by Julien Duvivier and Someone Behind the Door with Charles Bronson and Anthony Perkins. Jacques Robert was also a prolific screenwriter for film and television.

He died in Rouen in 1997 at the age of 76.

== Publications ==
- L'Invitation à la vie (1942)
- Les Tragédiennes (1944)
- Marie-Octobre (1948)
- Les Dents longues (1950)
- La Machination (1951)
- Le Désordre et la Nuit (1955)
- Une tragédie parisienne (1957)
- Le Gigolo (1959)
- Les Femmes du monde (1961)
- L'Appartement des filles (1963)
- Les Bonnes Âmes (1964)
- Le Pétard du diable (1965)
- Roulette russe (1966)
- Le Dangereux Été (1968)
- Rupture (1968)
- La Dragée haute (1969)
- Si ma mémoire est bonne. 1 (1969)
- Si ma mémoire est bonne. 2, Mon après-guerre (1969)
- Terreur à Tarragone (1969)
- Dictionnaire des Parisiens (1970)
- Les Cadets de Saumur (1970)
- Le Grand Serre (1971)
- Les Grandes Orgues (1973)
- À vous de jouer, Milord ! (1974)
- Les Gens de l'immeuble (1975)
- Quelqu'un derrière la porte (1975)
- Si ma mémoire est bonne. 3, Ma clé des champs (1976)
- Les Démons de minuit (1977)
- La Femme dans l'ombre (1979)
- Les Invités (1982)
- Le Méchant (1984)
- Adieu (cher poison (1986)
- L'Évasion d'Adolf Hitler (1989)
- Si ma mémoire est bonne. 4, les Stars de mes nuits (1991)

== Selected filmography ==
=== Screenwriter ===
- Madelon (1955)
- Difendo il mio amore (1956)
- Quand vient l'amour (1956)
- Burning Fuse (1957)
- The Mask of the Gorilla (1958, based on the novel Le Gorille vous salue bien by Antoine Dominique)
- La Valse du Gorille (1959, based on the novel La Valse du Gorille by Antoine Dominique)
- 125 Rue Montmartre (1959, based on the novel 125, rue Montmartre by André Gillois)
- Nathalie, Secret Agent (1959)
- The Nina B. Affair (1961, based on the novel Affäre Nina B. by Johannes Mario Simmel)
- The Black Monocle (1961, based on the novel Le Monocle noir by Colonel Rémy)
- L'assassin est dans l'annuaire (1962, based on the novel Cet imbécile de Ludovic by Charles Exbrayat)
- The Seventh Juror (1962, based on the novel Le Septième juré by Francis Didelot)
- The Eye of the Monocle (1962, based on the Monocle noir novels by Colonel Rémy)
- Miss Shumway Goes West (1963, based on the novel Miss Shumway Waves a Wand by James Hadley Chase)
- Maigret Sees Red (1963, based on the novel Maigret, Lognon and the Gangsters by Georges Simenon)
- Mission to Venice (1964, based on the novel Mission To Venice by James Hadley Chase)
- The Monocle Laughs (1964, based on the Monocle noir novels by Colonel Rémy)
- Faites vos jeux, mesdames (1965)
- The Majordomo (1965)
- Operation Double Cross (1965, based on a novel by René Cambon)
- Les Arnaud (1967)
- Les Hommes (1973)
- Docteur Justice (1975, based on the comics series Docteur Justice by Jean Ollivier and Carlo Raffaele Marcello)
- Victims of Vice (1978, based on the Brigade mondaine novels by Michel Brice edited by Gérard de Villiers)
- Champagne amer (1986)

=== Film adaptations ===
- The Long Teeth (1953, based on the novel Les Dents longues)
- Les Intrigantes (1954, based on the novel La Machination)
- Le désordre et la nuit (1958, based on the novel Le désordre et la nuit)
- Marie-Octobre (1959, based on the novel Marie-Octobre)
- The Gigolo (1960, based on the novel Le Gigolo)
- Girl's Apartment (1963, based on the novel L'Appartement des filles)
- To Commit a Murder (1967, based on the novel Peau d'espion)
- Someone Behind the Door (1971, based on the short story Quelqu'un derrière la porte)
