= List of prime ministers of Djibouti =

Prime Minister of Djibouti
- Premier Ministre du Djibouti (French)
- Coat of Arms

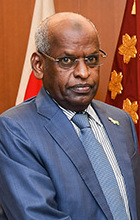
- Incumbent; Abdoulkader Kamil Mohamed since 1 April 2013
- Appointer: Ismail Omar Guelleh, as President of Djibouti
- Inaugural holder: Ali Aref Bourhan (French territory); Hassan Gouled Aptidon (Republic of Djibouti)
- Formation: 27 June 1977; 49 years ago
- Website: primature.gouv.dj

This is a list of prime ministers of Djibouti. Since the establishment of the office of prime minister in 1977, there have been 6 official prime ministers of Djibouti. The current prime minister is Abdoulkader Kamil Mohamed, since 1 April 2013.

The list also includes presidents of the Government Council of French Territory of the Afars and the Issas, which acted as heads of government of the area of present-day Djibouti between 1967 and 1977, before the proclamation of independence.

== List of officeholders ==
Political parties

National Union for Independence (NUI)
Afar Democratic Rally (ADR)
African People's League for the Independence (LPAI)
People's Rally for Progress (PRP)

No.	Portrait	Name (Birth–Death)	Election	Term of office			Political party (Coalition)	Ref.
No.	Portrait	Name (Birth–Death)	Election	Took office	Left office	Time in office	Political party (Coalition)	Ref.
• French Territory of the Afars and the Issas (1967–1977)
1		Ali Aref Bourhan (1934–2025)	1968; 1973	7 July 1967	29 July 1976	9 years, 22 days	NUI	
2		Abdallah Mohamed Kamil (born 1936)	—	29 July 1976	18 May 1977	293 days	ADR	
3		Hassan Gouled Aptidon (1916–2006)	1977	18 May 1977	27 June 1977	40 days	LPAI	
• Republic of Djibouti (1977–present) •
1		Hassan Gouled Aptidon (1916–2006)	—	27 June 1977	12 July 1977	15 days	LPAI	
2		Ahmed Dini Ahmed (1932–2004)	—	12 July 1977	5 February 1978	208 days	LPAI	
3		Abdallah Mohamed Kamil (born 1936)	—	5 February 1978	2 October 1978	239 days	LPAI	
4		Barkat Gourad Hamadou (1930–2018)	1982; 1987; 1992; 1997	2 October 1978	7 March 2001	22 years, 156 days	LPAI (until March 1979)	
		Barkat Gourad Hamadou (1930–2018)	1982; 1987; 1992; 1997	2 October 1978	7 March 2001	22 years, 156 days	RPP	
5		Dileita Mohamed Dileita (born 1959)	2003; 2008	7 March 2001	1 April 2013	12 years, 24 days	RPP (UMP)	
6		Abdoulkader Kamil Mohamed (born 1952)	2013; 2018; 2023	1 April 2013	Incumbent	13 years, 195 days	RPP (UMP)	

== See also ==
- History of Djibouti
- Politics of Djibouti
- List of presidents of Djibouti
- French Territory of the Afars and the Issas (FTAI)
- French Somaliland
  - List of governors of French Somaliland
