= List of governors of French Somaliland =

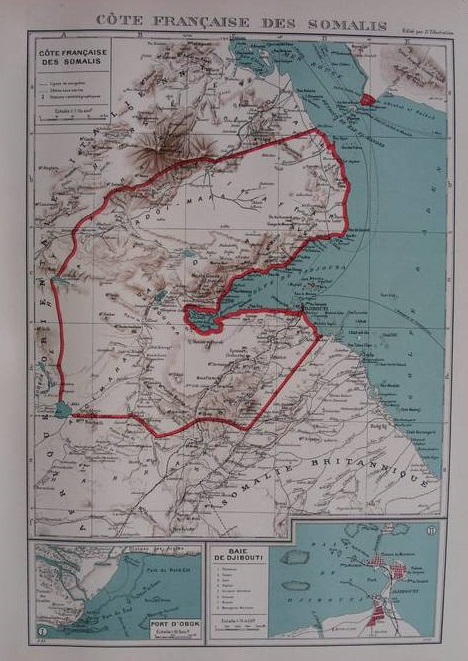
French Somaliland (bordered in red), 1938.

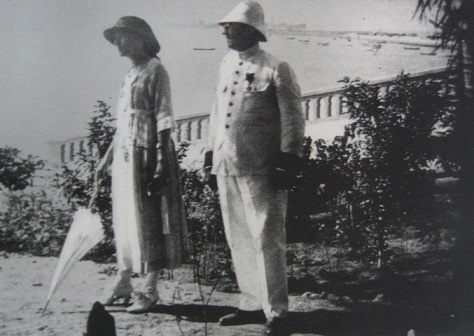
Governor Jules Lauret and wife c. 1920

This article lists the governors of French Somaliland and French Territory of the Afars and the Issas (French: Gouverneurs du Somaliland français et du Territoire français des Afars et des Issas) from 1884 to 1977. They administered the territory of modern-day Djibouti on behalf of the French Republic.

== List ==
Complete list of governors of French Somaliland:

Tenure (Note: Dates in italics indicate de facto continuation of office.)	Portrait	Incumbent	Notes
Obock
11 March 1862	French purchase of Obock. Remains unadministered and unoccupied until 1884.		
Territory of Obock and Dependencies (Territoire d'Obock et dépendances)
24 June 1884 to 7 August 1887		Léonce Lagarde, Commandant	
7 August 1887 to 20 May 1896		Léonce Lagarde, Governor	
French Somaliland (Côte française des Somalis)
20 May 1896 to 7 March 1899		Léonce Lagarde, Governor	
7 March 1899 to 11 March 1899		Antoine Mizon, Governor	
28 March 1899 to 13 April 1900		Alfred Albert Martineau, Governor	
13 April 1900 to 6 December 1900		Gabriel Louis Angoulvant, acting Governor	
6 December 1900 to 7 September 1901		Alphonse Bonhoure, Governor	1st term
7 September 1901 to June 1902		Louis Ormiéres, acting Governor	1st term
June 1902 to 23 May 1903		Alphonse Bonhoure, Governor	2nd term
23 May 1903 to December 1903		Albert Dubarry, acting Governor	1st term
December 1903 to 2 April 1904		Alphonse Bonhoure, Governor	3rd term
2 April 1904 to 5 August 1904		Albert Dubarry, acting Governor	
5 August 1904 to 9 September 1905		Pierre Hubert Auguste Pascal, Governor	1st term
9 September 1905 to 13 October 1905		Raphaël Antonetti, acting Governor	
13 October 1905 to 19 May 1906		Louis Ormiéres, acting Governor	2nd term
19 May 1906 to 19 June 1906		Paul Patté, acting Governor	
19 June 1906 to July 1908		Pierre Hubert Auguste Pascal, Governor	2nd term
July 1908 to 5 July 1909		Jean Baptiste Castaing, acting Governor	1st term
5 January 1909 to June 1911		Pierre Hubert Auguste Pascal, Governor	3rd term
June 1911 to December 1911		Jean Baptiste Castaing, acting Governor	2nd term
December 1911 to April 1913		Pierre Hubert Auguste Pascal, Governor	4th term
25 April to May 1913		Henri Carreau, acting Governor	1st term
May 1913 to 2 March 1914		Adrien Jules Jean Bonhoure, Governor	
2 March 1914 to 7 February 1915		Fernand Deltel, acting Governor	
7 February 1915 to 14 April 1915		Henri Carreau, acting Governor	2nd term
14 April 1915 to 19 September 1916		Paul Simoni, Governor	
1916 to 1917		Victor Marie Fillon, Governor	
28 August 1917 to 8 September 1918		Édouard Geffriaud, acting Governor	
8 September 1918 to 3 May 1920		Jules Lauret, Governor	1st term
3 May 1920 to 29 June 1920		M. Lassaigne, acting Governor	
29 June 1920 to 29 November		Edmond Lippman, acting Governor	1st term
29 November 1920 to 25 May 1922		Jules Lauret, Governor	2nd term
25 May 1922 to 8 January 1923		Edmond Lippman, acting Governor	2nd term
8 January 1923 to 22 February 1924		Jules Lauret, Governor	3rd term
1924 to 1934		Pierre-Amable Chapon-Baissac, Governor	
7 May 1934 to 18 July 1935		Jules Marcel de Coppet, Governor	
18 July 1935 to 20 December 1935		Achille Louis Auguste Silvestre, Governor	
20 December 1935 to 1 May 1937		Armand Léon Annet, Governor	
1 May 1937 to 19 March 1938		François Pierre-Alype, acting Governor	
19 March 1938 to 27 April 1938		François Pierre-Alype, Governor	
27 April 1938 to 2 May 1939		Hubert Jules Deschamps, acting Governor	
2 May 1939 to 25 July 1940		Hubert Jules Deschamps, Governor	
25 July 1940 to 7 August 1940		Gaetan Louis Elie Germain, Governor	
7 August 1940 to 21 October 1942		Pierre Nouailhetas, Governor	
21 October 1942 to 4 December 1942		Auguste Charles Jules Truffert, Governor	
4 December 1942 to 26 December 1942		Christian Raimond Dupont, Governor	
30 December 1942 to 22 June 1943		André Bayardelle, Governor	
22 June 1943 to 7 January 1944		Michel Raphael Saller, acting Governor	
7 January 1944 to 1 May 1944		Michel Raphael Saller, Governor	
1 May 1944 to 30 April 1946		Jean Chalvet, Governor	
30 April 1946 to 1 March 1950		Paul Henri Siriex, Governor	
1 March 1950 to 6 April 1954		Numa François Henri Sadoul, Governor	
6 April 1954 to 13 August 1954		Roland Pré, Governor	
13 August 1954 to 7 August 1957		René Jean Albert Petitbon, Governor	
7 August 1957 to 1958		Maurice Meker, Governor	
1958 to 16 November 1962		Jacques Marie Julien Compain, Governor	
16 November 1962 to 15 September 1966		René Tirant, Governor	
15 September 1966 to 3 July 1967		Louis Joseph Édouard Saget, Governor	
French Territory of the Afars and the Issas (Territoire français des Afars et des Issas)
3 July 1967 to 5 February 1969		Louis Joseph Édouard Saget, High Commissioner	
5 February 1969 to 21 August 1971		Dominique Ponchardier, High Commissioner	
21 August 1971 to 1 August 1974		Georges Thiercy, High Commissioner	
1 August 1974 to 9 February 1976		Christian Dablanc, High Commissioner	
9 February 1976 to 27 June 1977		Camille d'Ornano, High Commissioner	
27 June 1977	Independence as Republic of Djibouti		

For continuation after independence, see: List of presidents of Djibouti

== See also ==
- History of Djibouti
- Politics of Djibouti
- List of presidents of Djibouti
- List of prime ministers of Djibouti
- French Somaliland
- French Territory of the Afars and the Issas
