= Republican Union (French Somaliland) =

Republican Union Union républicaine
- Leader: Mahamoud Harbi Farah
- Founded: 1957
- Dissolved: 1963
- Succeeded by: FLCS
- Ideology: Somali nationalism Pan-Somalism

Republican Union (French: Union républicaine) was a political party in French Somaliland.

== History ==
The Republic Union was founded by Mahamoud Harbi Farah, a member of the French National Assembly. The party contested the 1957 territorial assembly election, winning 61% of the vote and all 30 seats in the assembly. After the election Harbi became vice-president of the governing council of the territory. At the time, the party was allied to the African Democratic Rally. The party advocated the unification of all Somali-speaking areas into one state.

Harbi and the Republican Union supported full independence in the 1958 referendum. After the referendum had been held (resulting in a defeat for the pro-independentists), pro-French leader Hassan Gouled called for fresh elections to the territorial assembly. Harbi's government was deposed in a no confidence vote and the assembly was dissolved by the French governor Meker.

The Republican Union mobilized protests against the dissolution of the territorial assembly. The protests turned violent; riots erupted and several persons died. The party was illegalized, and the party leaders were jailed. Harbi also disappeared from the local political scene, having been exiled to Cairo by the French authorities in 1958. He died in a plane crash two years later under mysterious circumstances.

In December 1958, five imprisoned Republican Union leaders were released. The party continued to operate illegally. It had good contacts with the Greater Somalia League.

In 1963, former followers of Harbi founded the Front de Libération de la Côte des Somalis.
