= 1957 French Somaliland Territorial Council election =

Territorial Council elections were held in French Somaliland on 23 June 1957. The Republican Union won all 30 seats.

== Background ==
The elections were the first held under the loi cadre system, which granted equal voting rights to all residents and scrapped the dual college system. The new electoral system led to the creation of the territory's first real political parties; Harbi Farah Mahamoud formed the Republican Union, whilst Hassan Gouled Aptidon established the Defence of Economic and Social Interests of the Territory (DIEST) party.

Mahamoud (a member of the National Assembly), Aptidon (a member of the Council of the Republic) and Mohamed Kamil (a member of the French Union Assembly) all sought to implement the new system in a way that favoured their own parties; Harbi produced a draft decree in late 1956 that would increase the number of constituencies from three to four, and give 20 of the 32 seats in an enlarged Council to the city of Djibouti.

Kamil, supported by Aptidon, proposed a 30-member Council, with Djibouti having 13 seats and Obock–Tadjoura and Ali Sabieh–Dikhil six each. However, other members of the Union Assembly reduced the number of members to 25.

== Electoral system ==
Ultimately the French Government approved a 30-member Council in which Djibouti had 18 seats and Obock–Tadjoura and Ali Sabieh–Dikhil had six seats each. The right to vote was restricted to native men and French citizens who had lived in the territory for at least a year.

== Results ==
Party	Votes	%	Seats
Republican Union	4,180		30
Defence of Economic and Social Interests of the Territory	3,494		0
Total			30
Registered voters/turnout	11,676	68	
Source: Thompson & Adloff

=== Seats won by ethnic group ===
Ethnic group	Seats
Issas	8
Afars	7
Somalis	7
Europeans	5
Arabs	3
Total	30
Source: Sternberger et al.

== Aftermath ==
Following the elections, Harbi Farah Mahamoud became Vice President of the Government Council (the post of President was held by the Governor). His cabinet included:

- Minister of Education: Pierre Blin
- Minister of Finance: Ali Coubèche
- Minister of Health: Ibrahmin Sultan
- Minister of the Civil Service: Osman Ali
- Minister of the Interior: Hamed Hassan Liban
- Minister of the Port and Public Works: Harbi Farah Mahamoud
