= Afar Democratic Union =

Political party of the French Territory of the Afars and the Issas

The Afar Democratic Union (French: Union Democratique Afar, UDA) was a political party of the French Territory of the Afars and the Issas.

== History ==
Created in 1960–1961 by Orbiss Gaddito and Mohamed Kamil Mohamed, the party was joined by Ali Aref Bourhan and Ahmed Dini in 1962. The UDA won the territorial elections in 1963. In 1965, Ali Aref left the UDA after losing control of the party, instead creating the Afar Democratic Rally (RDA). The UDA was close to the Party of Popular Movement (PMP), with which it organized an independence demonstration in August 1966.

It supported the maintenance of the territory under French sovereignty in the March 1967 referendum.
