= 1977 Afars and Issas independence referendum =

An independence referendum was held in the French Territory of the Afars and the Issas on 8 May 1977 alongside an election for a Constituent Assembly. Previous referendums were held in 1958 and 1967, which rejected independence. This referendum backed independence from France. The territory became independent as Djibouti on 27 June 1977.

The result is celebrated annually on Independence Day on 27 June.

== Results ==
| Choice | Votes | % |
|---|---|---|
| Independence | 80,864 | 99.75 |
| Remain a territory in the French Republic | 199 | 0.25 |
| Total | 81,063 | 100.00 |
| Valid votes | 81,063 | 99.04 |
| Invalid/blank votes | 784 | 0.96 |
| Total votes | 81,847 | 100.00 |
| Registered voters/turnout | 105,962 | 77.24 |
Source: Nohlen et al.
