= 1963 French Somaliland Territorial Council election =

Territorial Council elections were held in French Somaliland on 18 November 1963. Ali Aref Bourhan was elected president of the Executive Council following the elections.

== Electoral system ==
The elections were held using plurality voting in seven districts, with voters casting votes for candidate lists.

== Results ==
Party	Votes	%	Seats	+/–
Afar Democratic Union			21	New
Party of the People's Movement			6	New
Issa Democratic Union			2	New
Others			3	–
Total			32	0
Total votes	21,408	–		
Registered voters/turnout	28,728	74.52		
Source: JPRS, Thompson & Adloff

=== By ethnicity ===
Ethnic group	Seats	+/–
Afars	16	+3
Issas	8	0
Somalis	3	–3
Europeans	4	0
Arabs	1	0
Total	32	0
Source: Sternberger et al.

== Aftermath ==
Following the elections, Ali Aref Bourhan was elected vice-president of the Assembly by a vote of 27–5.
