= List of colonial governors of Dahomey =

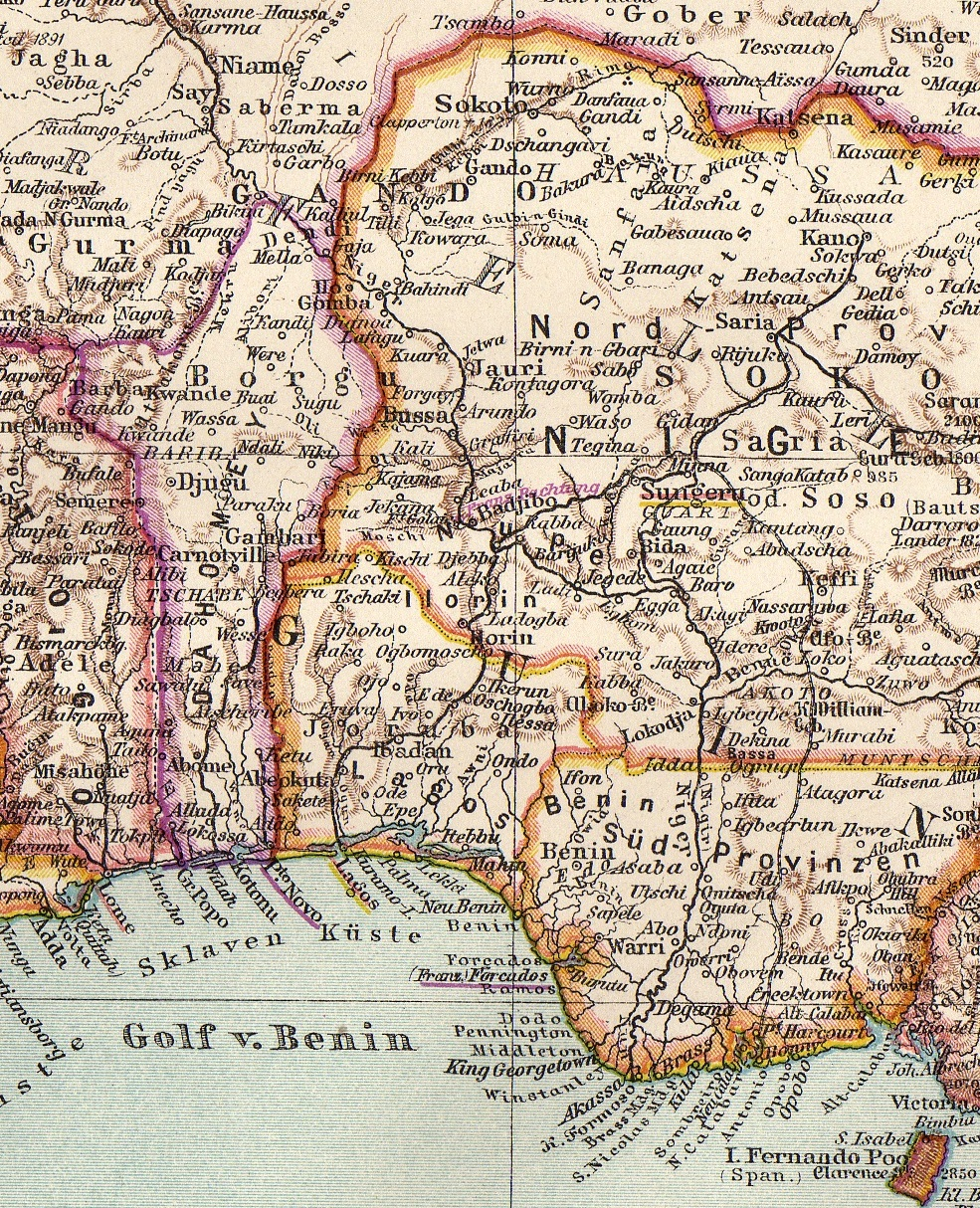
French Dahomey (bordered in purple), 1907.

This article lists the colonial governors of the former French Dahomey (1904–1958) in French West Africa, the present day nation of Benin.

== List ==
(Dates in italics indicate de facto continuation of office)

Tenure	Portrait	Incumbent	Notes
French Suzerainty
French Protectorate of Porto-Novo Protectorate placed over the Porto-Novo (Hogbonu) Kingdom
25 February 1863 to 2 January 1865		Marius Daumas, Agent	
Porto-Novo Kingdom
2 January 1865 to 14 April 1882	none		
French Protectorate of Porto-Novo			Restored
14 April 1882 to June 1882			
June 1882 to 1883		Bonaventure Colonna de Lecca, Resident	
1883 to 1883		Henri Guilman, Resident	
1883 to 1884		Daniel Germa, Resident	
1884 to July 1884		Léopold Maignot, Resident	
July 1884 to 1886		Dixon Myaz, Resident	
1886 to 1886		Émmanuel Roget, Resident	
1886 to 1887		Jean-Marie Bayol, Resident	
1887 to 16 June 1887		Gentian-Antonin-Maire Péréton, Resident	
16 June 1887 to 11 July 1888		Victor-Marie-Paul Ballot, Resident	1st term
11 July 1888 to 1889		Paul-Alphonse-Frédéric-Mari de Beeckmann, Administrator	
1889 to 19 October 1889		Louis-Frédéric-Émil Tautain, Resident	
19 October 1889 to 22 December 1891		Victor-Marie-Paul Ballot, Resident	2nd term
22 December 1891 to 22 June 1893		Victor-Marie-Paul Ballot, Lieutenant Governor	
Porto-Novo Colony
22 June 1893 to 20 January 1894		Victor-Marie-Paul Ballot, Lieutenant Governor	
Dahomey Colony
20 January 1894 to 22 June 1894		Victor-Marie-Paul Ballot, Lieutenant Governor	
22 June 1894 to 3 July 1899		Victor-Marie-Paul Ballot, Governor	
3 July 1899 to 8 October 1899		Jean-Baptiste Fonssagrives, acting Governor	
8 October 1899 to 26 November 1900		Pierre-Hubert-Auguste Pascal, acting Governor	
26 November 1900 to 5 May 1906		Victor-Théophile Liotard, Governor	
5 May 1906 to 9 June 1906		Joseph-Étienne-Gabriel Lhuerre, acting Governor	
9 June 1906 to 16 July 1906		Charles-Emmanuel-Joseph Marchal, acting Governor	
16 July 1906 to 8 March 1908		Charles-Emmanuel-Joseph Marchal, Governor	
8 March 1908 to 22 September 1908		Marie-Antoine Gaudart, acting Governor	
22 September 1908 to 9 October 1908		Charles-Désiré-Auguste Brunet, acting Governor	
9 October 1908 to 25 April 1909		Jean-Jules-Émile Peuvergne, Governor	
25 April 1909 to 6 March 1911		Henri-Jules-Jean-Baptiste Malan, Governor	
6 March 1911 to 24 June 1911		Raphaël-Velentin-Marius Antonetti, Governor	
Dahomey Colony and Dependencies
24 June 1911 to 9 May 1912		Emile Merwart, Lieutenant-Governor	
9 May 1912 to 11 July 1912		Charles-Henri-Adrien Noufflard, acting Lieutenant-Governor	
11 July 1912 to 7 April 1917		Charles-Henri-Adrien Noufflard, Lieutenant-Governor	
7 April 1917 to July 1919		Gaston Fourn, acting Lieutenant-Governor	
July 1919 to 29 August 1928		Gaston Fourn, Lieutenant-Governor	
29 August 1928 to 4 April 1929		Lucien-Eugène Geay, acting Lieutenant-Governor	
4 April 1929 to 8 February 1931		Dieudonné-François-Joseph-Marie Reste, Lieutenant-Governor	
8 February 1931 to 7 January 1932		Théophile-Antione-Pascal Tellier, Lieutenant-Governor	
7 January 1932 to 2 August 1932		Louis-Placide Blacher, Lieutenant-Governor	
2 August 1932 to 22 July 1933		Louis Aujas, acting Lieutenant-Governor	
22 July 1933 to 24 August 1934		Jules Marcel de Coppet, Lieutenant-Governor	
24 August 1934 to 15 February 1935		Jean Desanti, acting Lieutenant-Governor	
15 February 1935 to 12 January 1937		Maurice-Léon Bourgine, Lieutenant-Governor	
12 January 1937 to 7 August 1937		Henri-Étienne Martinet, acting Lieutenant-Governor	1st term
7 August 1937 to 7 April 1938		Ernest Gayon, acting Lieutenant-Governor	
7 April 1938 to 1 June 1938		Henri-Étienne Martinet, acting Lieutenant-Governor	2nd term
1 June 1938 to 27 August 1940		Armand Léon Annet, Lieutenant-Governor	
27 August 1940 to 18 September 1940		Pierre-Jean-André Paliceti, acting Lieutenant-Governor	
18 September 1940 to 26 August 1943		Léon-Hippolyte Truitard, Lieutenant-Governor	
26 August 1943 to 21 May 1946		Charles-André-Maurice-Assier de Pompignan, Lieutenant-Governor	
Dahomey Overseas Territory
21 May 1946 to 14 January 1948		Robert Legendre, acting Governor	
14 January 1948 to 13 January 1949		Jean-Georges Chambon, Governor	
13 January 1949 to 19 September 1949		Jacques-Alphonse Boissier, Governor	
19 September 1949 to November 1951		Claude Valluy, acting Governor	
November 1951 to 21 June 1955		Charles-Henri Bonfils, Governor	
21 June 1955 to 21 March 1958		Marc-Casimir Biros, Governor	In some sources Casimir-Marc Biros
21 March 1958 to 15 July 1958		Bernard Hepp, acting Governor	
15 July 1958 to 4 December 1958		René Tirant, acting Governor	
Republic of Dahomey	Autonomous		
4 December 1958 to 1 August 1960		René Tirant, High Commissioner	
1 August 1960	Independence as Republic of Dahomey		

For continuation after 1958 independence, see: List of presidents of Benin.

== See also ==
- Kingdom of Dahomey (1600−1904)
- French Dahomey (1904−1958)
- Republic of Dahomey (1958–1975)
- People's Republic of Benin (1975–1990)
- Benin (1990−present)
- Lists of French colonial governors and administrators
