= French Djibouti =

French Djibouti may refer to either one of:

- The French Somaliland (1883–1967), also known as the "French Coast of the Somalis"
- The French Territory of the Afars and the Issas (1967–1977)
