= 1956 French legislative election in French Somaliland =

Elections to the French National Assembly were held in French Somaliland on 2 January 1956 as part of the wider French parliamentary elections. Harbi Farah Mahamoud was elected as the territory's MP.

== Results ==
Candidate	Votes	%
Harbi Farah Mahamoud	2,119	51.15
Michel Habib-Deloncle	952	22.98
Jean-Carles Martine	377	9.10
André Griveau	257	6.20
Robert Le Guyon	180	4.34
Nour Djama	168	4.06
Boualé Roblé	60	1.45
Félix Zouain	30	0.72
Total	4,143	100.00
Valid votes	4,143	98.81
Invalid/blank votes	50	1.19
Total votes	4,193	100.00
Registered voters/turnout	6,003	69.85
Source: Sternberger et al.
