= Front for the Liberation of the Somali Coast =

Guerrilla group in French Somaliland

Front de Libération de la Côte des Somalis
- Active: 1960–1977
- Disbanded: 27 June 1977
- Country: French Somaliland (1960–1967); French Territory of the Afars and the Issas (1967–1977)
- Type: Paramilitary (pre-independence); Unified armed forces (post-independence)
- Size: 3,000

The Front for the Liberation of the Somali Coast (French: Front de Libération de la Côte des Somalis, Somali: Jabhadda Xoreynta Xeebta Soomaaliyeed, Arabic: جبهة تحرير الساحل الصومالي) was a nationalist organization, and later a guerrilla group that fought for the independence of Djibouti from France. The Front de Libération de la Côte des Somalis (FLCS) was recognized as a national liberation movement by the Organisation of African Unity (OAU), which participated in its financing. FLCS was able to obtain support from Arab countries such as Algeria.

== History ==
The background of the FLCS can be traced back to the growing anti-colonialism and Djiboutian nationalist sentiments since decolonization of Africa. The Front de Libération de la Côte des Somalis (FLCS) was established in 1960 by Mahamoud Harbi. Its founding president was Adan Abdulle. Djibouti was a France strategic and military stronghold in East Africa and at the gateway to the Red Sea, remains jealously guarded within the French perimeter. It is the military stronghold of France, with its legionnaires and its air base, open to the Gulf. In July 1966, anger grew and voices demanded independence. In August 1966, on the road to his world tour (made famous by the Phnom Penh speech then his “atomic” tour in the Pacific), de Gaulle made a stopover in Djibouti.

Speaking in the Assembly, de Gaulle tried to regain control and, a bit like in August 1958 with the Guinean and Senegalese episodes of his African tour, exclaimed: "The signs, which we were able to read, and the agitations of those who wore them, are certainly not enough to demonstrate the democratic will of the French territory here. It is possible that a day will come when, through democratic means, the territory will express an opinion different from the one it has expressed until now.” French government policemen and Djiboutian nationalists clashed in Djibouti City on 25–26 August 1966, resulting in the deaths of ten civilians and one government policeman. Twenty-seven individuals were arrested for their involvement in the demonstrations. A barbed wire barrier was built to surround Djibouti City: officially, it was to fight against illegal Somali immigration; but it is also a tool for political control of populations supported by the French army - something that Pierre Messmer, Minister of the Armed Forces, deplored, and which constituted an argument for his opposition to Jacques Foccart on the Djiboutian issue. However, Jacques Foccart stands out as a fierce supporter of this wall, denounced as a “wall of shame” by the nationalists of the Front for the Liberation of the Somali Coast. The French government deported some 6,000 ethnic Somalis to Somalia between August 1966 and March 1967. Djibouti nationalists demonstrated for independence on 13–21 September 1966, resulting in the deaths of 21 individuals. On 21 September 1966, Governor-General Louis Saget announced the French government's decision to hold a referendum on the status of French Somaliland. Six individuals were killed by French government troops near Djibouti City between 1 October and 21 November 1966. The first Secretary General of the FLCS was Abdourrahman Ardeye, replaced in 1966 by a close collaborator of Harbi, Abdourrahaman Ahmed Hassan, known as "Gabode", who was succeeded 1966 after serving a two-year prison sentence, from the end of 1969, by Aden Robleh Awaleh. Eighteen individuals were arrested for their involvement in the demonstrations.

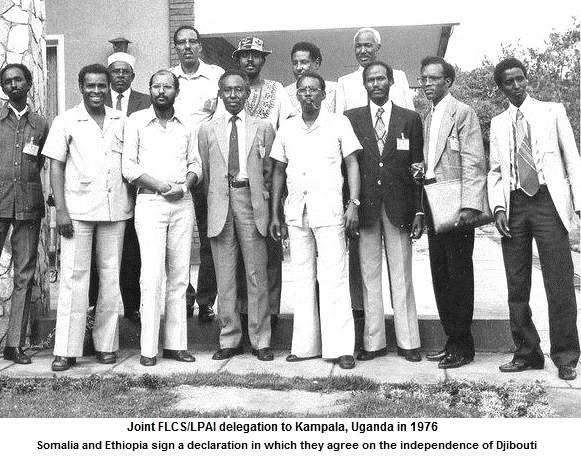
Joint FLCS-LPAI delegation to Kampala in 1976

Some 60 percent of voters, mostly ethnic Afars with some Somalis and Arabs, favored remaining as an overseas territory of France (known as the French Territory of the Afars and Issas) in a referendum held on 19 March 1967. French government troops suppressed demonstrations in Djibouti City on 20 March 1967, resulting in the deaths of eleven individuals. Four individuals were killed by French government troops on 6 April 1967. French Somaliland was renamed the French Territory of the Afars and the Issas on 3 July 1967. Legislative elections were held on 17 November 1968, and the Afar Democratic Rally (Rassemblement Démocratique Afar–RDA) won 20 out of 32 seats in the assembly. FLCS began armed activities outside Djibouti in 1968. In January 1970 the Front de Libération de la Côte des Somalis claimed an attack on the popular Palm in Zinc, a bar in Djibouti City.

Legislative elections were held on 18 November 1973. The Majorité coalition, consisting mostly of ethnic Afars, won most of the seats in the assembly. Eleven individuals were killed in political violence in Djibouti on 25–26 May 1975. In 1975 the Front de Libération de la Côte des Somalis kidnapped the ambassador of France in Mogadishu – Somalia, Jean Guery, to be exchanged against two activists of FLCS members who was imprisoned in mainland France. In December 1975, it claimed a failed attack against Ali Aref Bourhan.

On 31 December 1975, the UN General Assembly called on the French government to withdraw from the colony. In February 1976, the FLCS claims the hijacking of a school bus, which ends with the death of the hostage-takers and two children. The Organization of African Unity (OAU) sent a 15-member fact-finding mission (Egypt, Guinea, Liberia, Mozambique, Senegal, Tanzania, Uganda, Zaire) to the region from 29 April to 11 May 1976.

French government troops fired on demonstrators in Tadjoura on 2 May 1976, resulting in the death of one individual. Thirteen individuals were killed in political violence in Djibouti on 10 July 1976. Abdallah Mohamed Kamil was elected prime minister by the Chamber of Deputies on 29 July 1976. Representatives of the French government and Djibouti nationalists held negotiations in Paris beginning on 28 February 1977. The OAU facilitated negotiations between representatives of the French government and Djibouti nationalists in Accra, Ghana from 28 March to 1 April 1977. Constituent Assembly elections were held on 8 May 1977, and the People's Rally for Independence (Rassemblement Populaire pour Independence-RPI) won 65 out of 65 seats in the assembly. Some 99 percent of Djibouti voters favored independence from France in a referendum held on 8 May 1977. On 27 June 1977, officially marking Djibouti's independence.

The FLCS' military struggle was actively supported by the government of Somalia. The group also received assistance from the OAU as a national liberation movement. In the 1971–1972 period, the FLCS received 1500 pounds sterling from the OAU, 0.14% of the total amount donated by the body to different African liberation movements at the time. The FLCS evolves in its demands between the request of integration in a possible "Great Somalia" or the simple independence of the territory. In 1975 FLCS approaches the African People's League for the Independence and finally opts for independence path, causing tensions with Mogadishu, Somalia. At independence of the territory on 27 June 1977, 2,000 to 2,500 FLCS militants are integrated into the new Djiboutian Armed Forces, but not those of the MLD despite the request of Ahmed Dini.
