= Someone Behind the Door =

- French theatrical release poster
- Directed by: Nicolas Gessner
- Written by: Marc Behm; Nicolas Gessner; Jacques Robert (novel); Lorenzo Ventavoli
- Produced by: Raymond Danon
- Starring: Charles Bronson; Anthony Perkins; Jill Ireland; Henri Garcin
- Cinematography: Pierre Lhomme
- Edited by: Victoria Mercanton
- Music by: Georges Garvarentz
- Production company: Lira Films
- Distributed by: SNC
- Release date: 15 September 1971 (US premiere)
- Running time: 97 minutes
- Country: France
- Language: English

Someone Behind the Door (French: Quelqu'un derrière la porte) is a 1971 French crime-drama film directed by Nicolas Gessner. In the UK, it was twice retitled as Two Minds For Murder (theatrical title) and Brainkill (VHS title). It is based on a novel by Jacques Robert. The film was shot on location in Folkestone, England.

== Plot ==
A neurosurgeon and psychiatrist manipulates an amnesiac to murder his wife's lover, believing that the patient will have no memory of what he has done, providing the surgeon with a perfect alibi.

== Cast ==
Actor	Role
Charles Bronson	"The Stranger"
Anthony Perkins	Laurence Jeffries
Jill Ireland	Frances Jeffries
Henri Garcin	Paul Damien
Adriano Magistretti	Andrew
Agathe Natanson	Lucy

== Production ==
=== Filming ===
Almost all of the film was shot at various locations in Folkestone. Key locations include Folkestone Harbour and Beach.

=== Controversy ===
When Charles Bronson appeared on the Dick Cavett Show, with fellow guests Richard Attenborough and Jill Ireland (Bronson’s wife) he confirmed that this was one story about his attacking a director that was true. On the last day of filming his frustration at the director, who he believed had stuck doggedly to a poor plan of how to film the story, boiled over, he grabbed Nicolas Gessner by the throat, and gave him a shake. Jill Ireland confirmed this and agreed with Bronson’s assessment of Gessner, “He was a bit thick”
