= 1967 French Somaliland independence referendum =

- 19 March 1967
- Do you want the territory to become part of the French Republic under a new local government, the details of which have been brought to your attention?
- Outcome: Remain and transformed into the French Territory of the Afars and the Issas

Results
| Choice | Votes | % |
|---|---|---|
| Remain ("Yes") | 22,555 | 60.60% |
| Independence ("No") | 14,666 | 39.40% |
| Valid votes | 37,221 | 99.70% |
| Invalid or blank votes | 111 | 0.30% |
| Total votes | 37,332 | 100.00% |
| Registered voters/turnout | 39,312 | 94.96% |
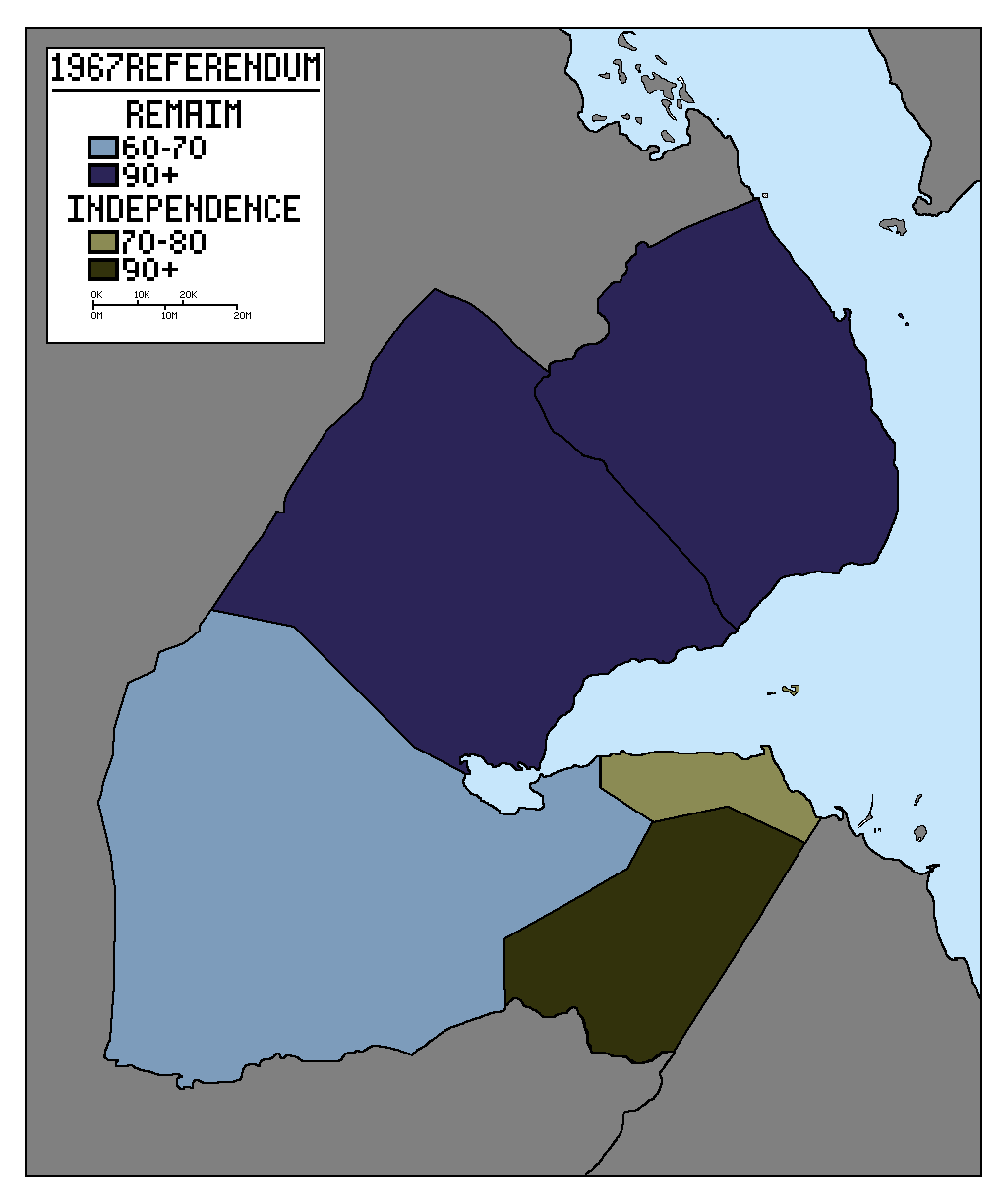
- Results by district

An independence referendum was held in French Somaliland on 19 March 1967. It was ordered by then President of France, General Charles de Gaulle, in response to rioting and demonstrations upon an official visit he made to the territory the year before. Voters rejected independence from France by a 22-point margin.

It was the second of three independence referendums. In the first referendum, the 1958 French Somaliland constitutional referendum, voters rejected independence by a 50-point margin. In the third referendum, the 1977 Afars and Issas independence referendum, voters near-unanimously backed independence.

== Conduct ==
In the lead up to the referendum, which the French referred to as a "plebiscite" to avoid the term "referendum", all sides, especially the French, made attempts to manipulate the results of the results. As with the previous referendum of 1958, the vote was marred by reports of vote rigging on the part of the French authorities, with some 10,000 Somalis deported under the pretext that they did not have valid identity cards. According to official figures, although the territory was at the time inhabited by 58,240 Somali and 48,270 Afar, only 14,689 Somali were allowed to register to vote compared to 22,004 Afar. Somali representatives also claimed that the French had simultaneously imported thousands of Afar nomads from neighboring Ethiopia to further tip the odds in their favor. The French authorities denied this, suggesting that Afars already greatly outnumbered Somalis on the voting lists.

The French also erected a barricade around Djibouti City to prevent "outsiders" from influencing the referendum. This blockade persisted into the night, during which French soldiers reportedly shot individuals attempting to enter the city and investigated people to verify their citizenship. Simultaneously, many opposition leaders were arrested by the government.

A UN request to observe the vote was ignored by the French government.

== Results ==
Initial results supported a continued but looser relationship with France, with 61% of the electorate voting for the status quo on a 95% turnout. Voting was also divided along ethnic lines, with the resident Somalis by and large voting for independence, with the goal of eventual reunion with Somalia, and the Afars generally opting to remain associated with France.

| Choice | Votes | % |
|---|---|---|
| Remain a territory in the French Republic | 22,555 | 60.60 |
| Independence | 14,666 | 39.40 |
| Total | 37,221 | 100.00 |
| Valid votes | 37,221 | 99.70 |
| Invalid/blank votes | 111 | 0.30 |
| Total votes | 37,332 | 100.00 |
| Registered voters/turnout | 39,312 | 94.96 |
Source: African Elections Database

== Aftermath ==
=== Riots ===
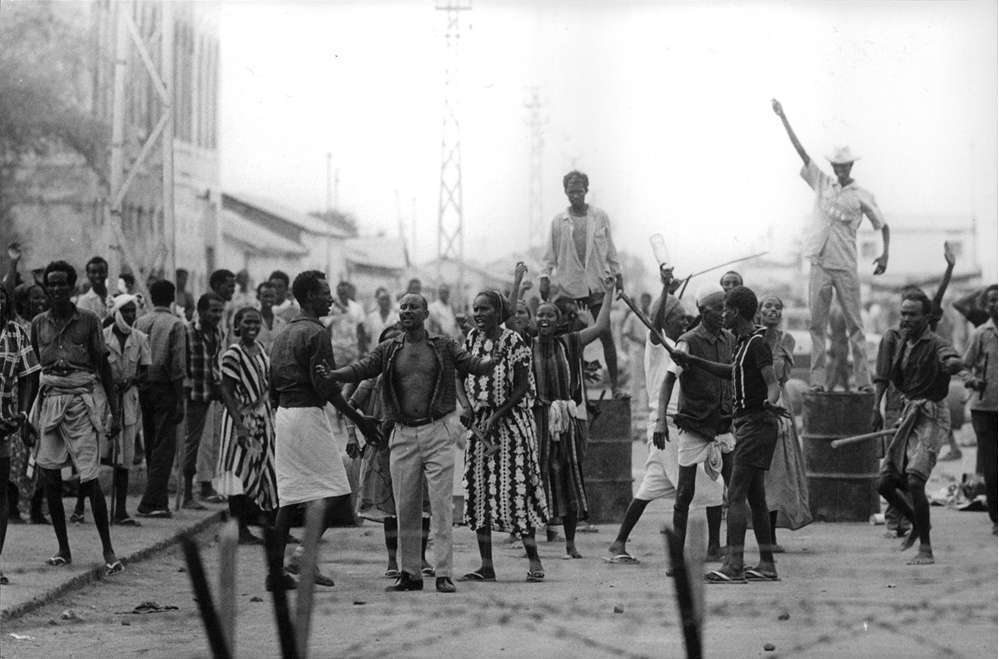
Post-referendum demonstrations on 23 March

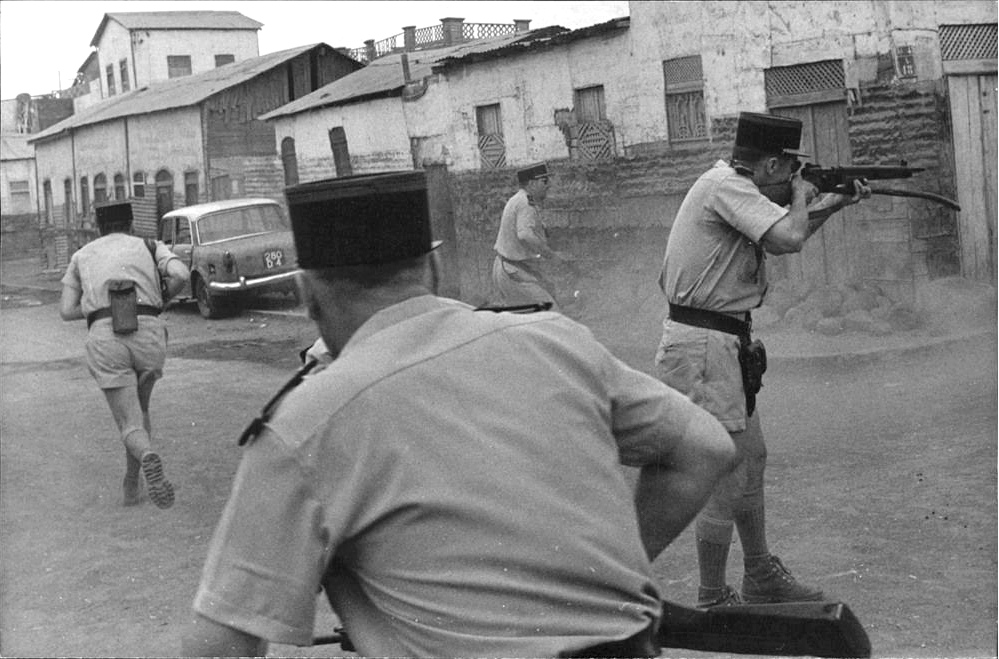
French forces shooting at "men disturbing the peace" on 23 March

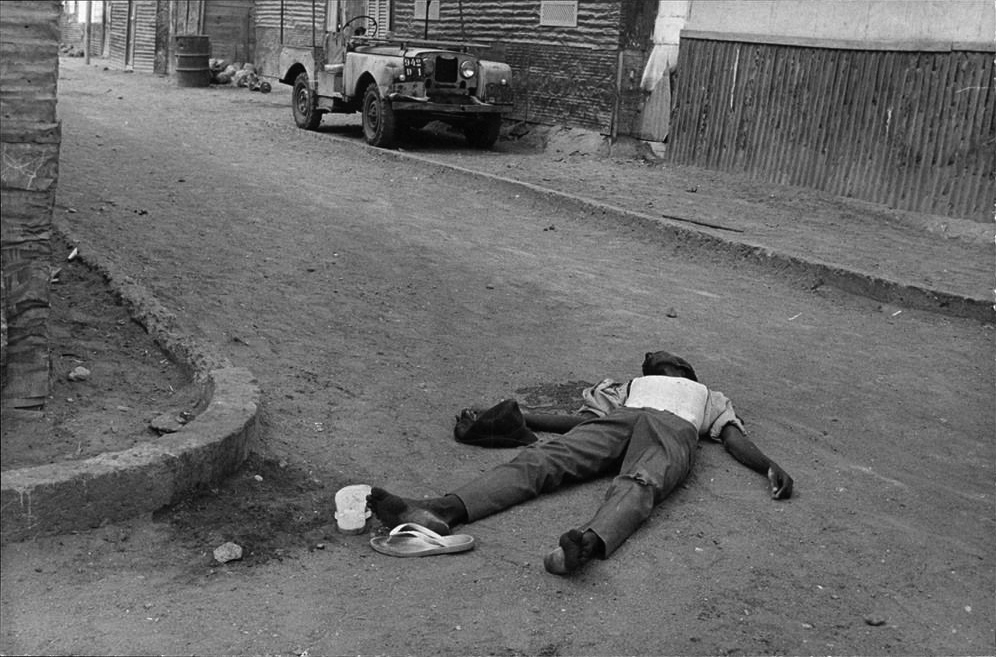
A man who has been shot and killed lying on the street on 23 March

Widespread riots erupted in the Shantytown district of Djibouti City immediately after the announcement of results. According to colonial governor Louis Saget, rioters from the densely populated and largely Somali neighbourhood were armed with guns, knives, and Molotov cocktails. Saget claimed they had been influenced by leaflets aimed at inciting rebellion and civil war. However, according to the Associated Press, journalists in the area only observed Somalis carrying stones. The French government expected the riots and had reinforced the city with up to 7,000 French soldiers and policemen. With the support of armored cars and machine guns, French forces ruthlessly pushed against the rioters, dismantling their hastily constructed barricades within 20 minutes. About 12–20 Somali were killed in the clashes, while only three French officers sustained injuries. In the aftermath of the riots, the African quarter of the city was placed under occupation by the army. A curfew was placed on the area and anyone breaking it was shot on sight. French soldiers went from house-to-house rounding up thousands of Somali men and women and sent them to a detention camp in the desert. There they were meant for deportation into Somalia, but the government refused to take them in. Instead, the governor decided to set up a perminited pernal camp for around 500 nationalists. Another 1,500 were to be sent to Ethiopia, and the other 3,000 were to eventually be freed.

Saget claimed that the vote averted a potential conflict between the French government and Ethiopian, Kenyan, and Somali forces, claiming their armies were ready to pounce on the colony if a majority had voted for independence. If accurate, a war could have broken out between the US-backed Ethiopians and Kenyans and the Soviet-backed Somali forces vying for control over the colony. In response to this perceived threat, the French government bolstered its military presence along the frontier.

=== Insurgency ===
Many of the 10,000 who were expelled from the colony joined the Front for the Liberation of the Somali Coast at the Somali border, where they launched a military campaign against the colonial government.
