= 1973 Afars and Issas Territorial Council election =

Territorial Council elections were held in the French Territory of the Afars and the Issas on 18 November 1973. The result was a victory for the "Majority" group of candidates, who were supportive of the government of Ali Aref Bourhan and mainly Afars. The other two groupings of candidates were "Moderation Opposition", who supported opposition leader Hassan Gouled Aptidon (mostly Issas and Somalis), and other opposition groups. Voter turnout was 75.6%.

== Results ==
Party	Votes	%	Seats
Pro-government Majority	26,852	75.86	40
Moderate Opposition	5,332	15.06	0
Other Opposition	3,214	9.08	0
Total	35,398	100.00	40
Valid votes	35,398	98.76	
Invalid/blank votes	443	1.24	
Total votes	35,841	100.00	
Registered voters/turnout	47,380	75.65	
Source: African Elections Database
