= Tew'o =

Tew'o تيو
- Town
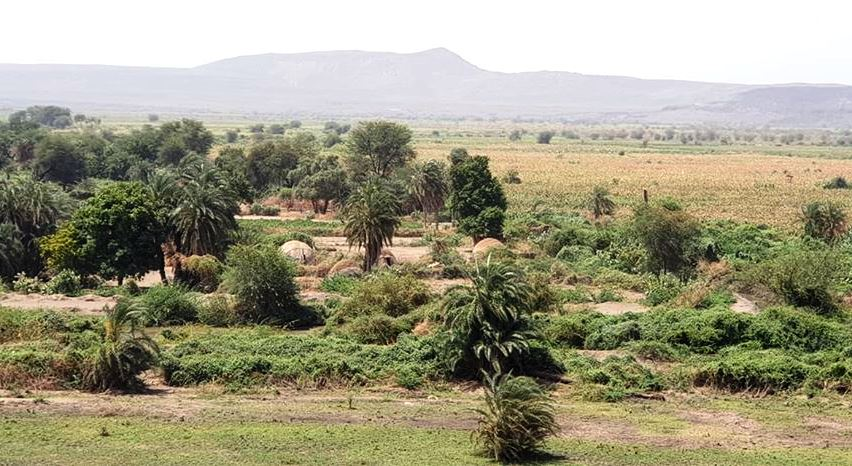

- Location in Djibouti
- Coordinates: 11°26′18″N 42°3′26″E
- Country: Djibouti
- Region: Dikhil
- Elevation: 165 m (541 ft)

Tew'o (Arabic: تيو) is a town in the southwestern Dikhil Region of Djibouti. It is situated approximately 59 km (43 mi) northwest of Dikhil, the regional capital.

== Overview ==
The village was originally built on the plain of Hanlé, with houses constructed of mud and stone and some Daboyta. An elementary school was established in the village in 1959, and there were several shops. Most of the inhabitants earned their living through animal husbandry and commerce, and used a well for drinking water. Nearby towns and villages include Yoboki (10 km) and Galafi (50 km). The majority of the population of Tew'o is Afars

== Notable people ==
- Barkat Gourad Hamadou, Former Prime Minister of Djibouti.
