= Ahmed-Idriss Moussa =

Djiboutian politician (1933–2020)

- Preceded by: Hassan Gouled Aptidon
- Succeeded by: Moussa Ali Abdoulkader

Personal details
- Born: 1 January 1933 Doudah, Djibouti
- Died: 5 June 2020 (aged 87)
- Party: Independent
- Other political affiliations: Rally for the Republic Group

Ahmed-Idriss Moussa (Somali: Axmed Idris Muuse; 1 January 1933 – 5 June 2020) was a Djiboutian politician who served in the French National Assembly from 1962 to 1967. An independent, he was the main opposition candidate in the 1999 presidential election against President Ismaïl Omar Guelleh.

== Background ==
Moussa was a nurse at the Peltier Hospital of Djibouti, then worked at the Banque de l'Indochine.

A nationalist militant, he participated in the founding of the Popular Movement Party (PMP), which he headed. He was elected to the Territorial Assembly on June 23, 1957, on the list of Mahmoud Harbi. He was elected to the French National Assembly in November 1962, supported by the PMP against Hassan Gouled Aptidon and Ahmed Dini. He sat until 1967 on the benches of the Union for the new Republic (UNR). In 1963, he signed the Arta agreement rejecting foreign claims on French Somaliland. In 1966 he would again support the independence movements.

At independence, he became a deputy. In 1981, he founded an opposition party with Ahmed Dini and Abdallah Mohamed Kamil. He was then arrested. In 1999, he ran in the presidential election against Ismail Omar Guelleh.

Moussa died on 5 June 2020, at the age of 87.
