= The Gigolo (1960 film) =

- Directed by: Jacques Deray
- Written by: Jacques Deray; Françoise Mallet-Joris; Jacques Robert
- Starring: Alida Valli; Jean-Claude Brialy
- Cinematography: Roger Dormoy
- Edited by: Paul Cayatte
- Music by: Jean Yatove
- Release date: 1960
- Language: French

The Gigolo (French: Le gigolo) is a 1960 French romantic drama film written and directed by Jacques Deray. It is loosely based on the novel Le Gigolo written by Jacques Robert.

== Plot ==
Agatha, a wealthy widow in her 40s, falls in love with the handsome doctor Damper. She then wants to end her former relationship with her young lover Jacky, who is not ready to let go.

== Cast ==
- Alida Valli as Agathe
- Jean-Claude Brialy as Jacky
- Jean Chevrier as Dr. Dampier
- Valérie Lagrange as Gillou
- Philippe Nicaud as Édouard
- Julien Bertheau as Commissioner
- Jean Degrave as Bligny
- Rosy Varte as Marilyn
- Jeanne Pérez as Marthe
- Sacha Briquet as Man at bar

== See also ==
- List of French films of 1960
