= The Mask of the Gorilla =

- Directed by: Bernard Borderie
- Written by: Jacques Robert
- Starring: Lino Ventura; Charles Vanel
- Release date: 15 August 1958
- Running time: 1h 30min
- Country: France
- Language: French

The Mask of the Gorilla (French: Le Gorille vous salue bien) is a 1958 French action film, directed by Bernard Borderie. It is based on a novel by Antoine Dominique (Dominique Ponchardier).

== Cast ==
- Lino Ventura - Géo Paquet - le gorille
- Charles Vanel - Colonel Berthomieu
- Pierre Dux - Veslot
- Bella Darvi - Isolène
- René Lefèvre - Commissaire Blavet
- Robert Manuel - Casa
- André Valmy - Mauricet
- Henri Crémieux - X.A. Pallos
- Jean-Roger Caussimon - Léon
- Jean-Max - Smolen
- Jean-Marie Rivière - Valério
- Yves Barsacq - Berthier
