= René Tirant =

René Tirant (22 November 1907 – 1978) was a colonial administrator in French West Africa in the 20th century. He was the acting Governor of Dahomey in 1958 when Dahomey became an autonomous republic, and remained High Commissioner till 1960 Dahomey became an independent country now known as Benin. From 1962 to 1966, he was the Governor of French Somaliland, which later became Djibouti.

== See also ==
- List of colonial governors of Dahomey
