= Mohamed Kamil =

Djiboutian politician (1917–2002)

Mohamed Kamil Mohamed (1 January 1917 – 9 June 2002) was a Djiboutian politician who served in the French Senate from 1959 until 1964.

== Biography ==
Born in Baylul region in Italian Eritrea, north of Assab, Kamil was a member of the Dankali clan of the Afars. After school, he worked as a nurse in a hospital in Djibouti.

He ran for election to the Representative Council in 1950, but was narrowly defeated. However, he was elected to the French Union Assembly in 1953, and subsequently joined the Rally of the French People. He remained a member of the French Union until 1958, and on 26 April 1959, was elected to the French Senate by a vote of 20–12. When he took his seat in the Senate, he joined the Union for the New Republic. He stood for re-election in 1965, but was not re-elected.
