= 1950 French Somaliland Representative Council election =

Representative Council elections were held in French Somaliland in December 1950.

== Electoral system ==
A new electoral law passed in August 1950 increase the number of members of the Representative Council from 20 to 25. Twelve members were elected by the first college (French citizens) and thirteen members by the second college.

The first college elected its members from a single nationwide constituency, whilst the second college members were elected from 10 constituencies, seven of which elected a single member and three of which elected two members. Five of the ten second college constituencies were in Djibouti, where voters were required to vote by ethnic group.

== Results ==
The results of the second college saw four Issas, four Afars, three Somalis and two Arabs elected. The Rally of the French People won a majority of seats.
