= François Pierre-Alype =

French civil servant and statesman

Marie François Julien Pierre-Alype
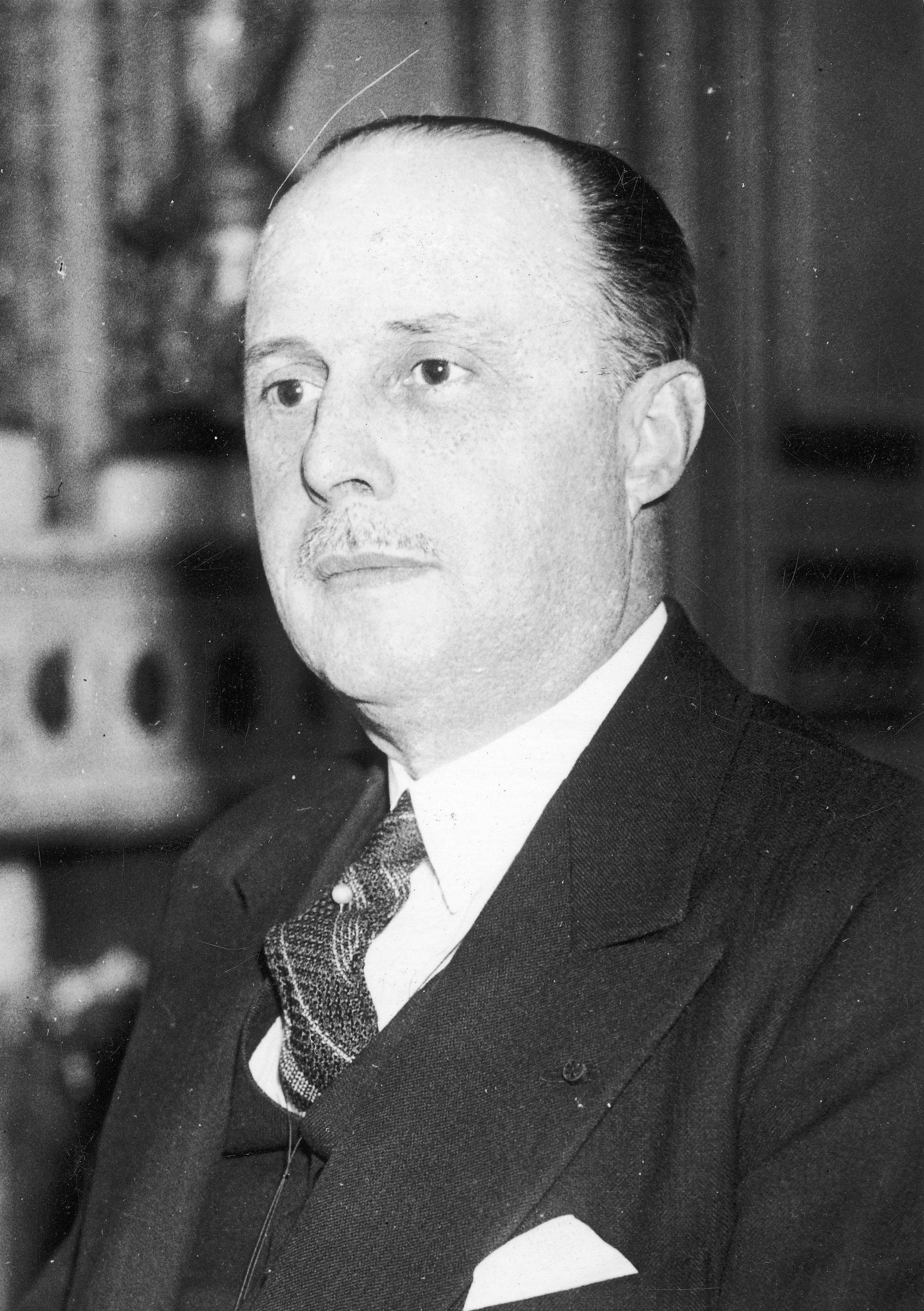
- François Pierre-Alype in 1934

Interim President of Syria
- In office 9 February 1926 – 28 April 1926
- Preceded by: Subhi Bey Barakat
- Succeeded by: Ahmad Nami

Governor of French Somaliland
- In office 1 May 1937 – 27 April 1938
- Preceded by: Hubert Jules Deschamps
- Succeeded by: Armand Annet

Personal details
- Born: 11 April 1886 Saint-Denis, Réunion, France
- Died: 5 February 1956 (aged 69) Suresnes, France
- Occupation: Civil servant, statesman, journalist
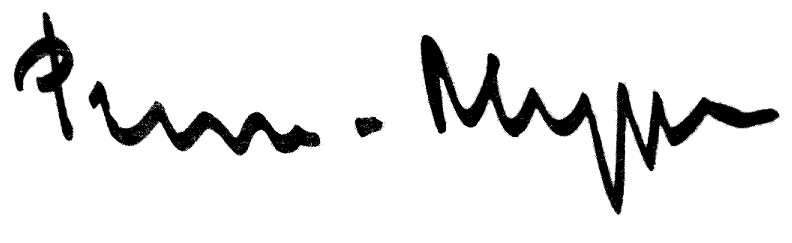
- Signature

François Pierre-Alype (11 April 1886 – 5 February 1956) was a French civil servant and statesman, in post in the colonial administration, then prefect.

== Biography ==
Pierre-Alype was the nephew of the deputy of the French Settlements in India from 1881 to 1898, Louis Pierre-Alype (1846–1906).

=== Colonial administration ===
He joined the colonial administration in 1906, as chief of staff to the governor of Réunion, then clerk of indigenous affairs in French West Africa (AOF) in 1908. He then co-edited, with Georges Boussenot, the periodical La Presse coloniale, until 1915. Between 1914 and 1916, he was deputy chief of staff of the Under-Secretary of State for Fine Arts. In 1916–17, he was deputy chief of staff to the Minister of Colonies, then deputy commissioner of the Republic in West Africa in 1918.

He became close to Léonce Lagarde, a former ambassador to Ethiopia, whom he received in his house in La Baule, Brittany. In 1922, Pierre-Alype headed an official mission in Ethiopia of the Franco-Abyssinian Syndicate and, on his return to France in 1923, he took part in the French team responsible for supporting Ethiopia's membership in the League of Nations. In 1924, he organized the visit to France of the future Emperor Haile Selassie.

He then became a delegate in Paris of the High Commissioner of the Levant. From 9 February to 28 April 1926, he took over from Damascus, on an interim basis, the leadership of the Syrian state, within a civil triumvirate set up by Henry de Jouvenel. This period is marked by an insurrection of the Druze against the French mandate.

Then he was appointed to the Superior Council of the Colonies and also served as commissioner for the colonial exhibition of 1931. In January 1933, he served as the director of the cabinet of the Minister of Labor and Social Welfare, Albert Dalimier. He then became governor of the French Somaliland from 15 June 1937 to 30 May 1938, when Ethiopia was invaded by the Italians, then governor of Guadeloupe from 29 November 1938 to 21 February 1940.

=== Prefect in France ===
Pierre-Alype was called to France by the former Minister of the Colonies, who became Minister of the Interior, Albert Sarraut. He was appointed Prefect of Charente-Maritime at the start of the WWII in February 1940, and there acquired a reputation as an anti-communist. He then became, by decision of the Minister of the Interior of the Vichy regime, Adrien Marquet, prefect of Gironde from August 1940 to May 1942. Being a follower of Philippe Pétain, he applied the Révolution nationale, in which he interned people including gypsies, communists and others to the Camp de Mérignac, then handed them to Nazi Germany to be executed in the Souge camp in Gironde.

However, he was later ousted and went on the run at the end of the war, as he was sentenced to death in absentia by the Bordeaux court of justice on 21 October 1946 for having "voluntarily maintained intelligence with a foreign power in times of war". He later surrendered himself and appeared at the Military Prosecutor's Office in Recherches-Midi, Paris, and was acquitted on 20 February 1955 by the Paris Military Tribunal.

== Awards ==
- Commander of the Legion of Honour (1933)
- Order of the Francisque

== Bibliography ==
- Bonin, Hubert; Lachaise, Bernard; Taliano-des Garets, Françoise (2007). Adrien Marquet, les dérives d'une ambition : Paris, Bordeaux, Vichy (1924-1955) (in French). Éditions Confluences.
- Michel, Marc (2003). Les Africains et la Grande Guerre : l'appel à l'Afrique (1914-1918) (in French). Paris: Éditions Karthala. ISBN 2-84586-417-5.
- Monin, Boris (2013). Le voyage du ras Tafari en Europe (1924): entre espoirs d'indépendance et réalités coloniales (in French). Paris: Éditions De Boccard. ISBN 978-2-7018-0368-5.
- Prijac, Lukian (2012). Lagarde l'éthiopien, le fondateur de Djibouti (1860-1936) (in French). Paris: L'Harmattan. ISBN 978-2-296-99130-9.
