= 1968 Afars and Issas Territorial Council election =

Territorial Council elections were held in Afars and Issas on 17 November 1968. The result was a victory for the Afar Democratic Rally, which won 20 out of 32 seats.

== Results ==
Ethnic group	Seats	+/–
Afars	16	0
Issas	8	0
Somalis	3	0
Europeans	4	0
Arabs	1	0
Total	32	0
Source: Sternberger et al.
