= Maigret, Lognon and the Gangsters =

1951 novel

- 1952 edition
- Author: Georges Simenon
- Language: French
- Genre: Detective
- Publisher: Presses de la Cité
- Publication date: 1951
- Publication place: France
- Media type: Print
- Pages: 190

Maigret, Lognon and the Gangsters (French: Maigret, Lognon et les gangsters) is a 1951 detective novel by the Belgian writer Georges Simenon, featuring the Paris police officer Jules Maigret. Simenon wrote it while living in Lakeville, Connecticut where he had moved after leaving France following the Liberation.

== Adaptation ==
In 1963 it was made into a film Maigret Sees Red directed by Gilles Grangier and starring Jean Gabin as Maigret.

== Bibliography ==
- Goble, Alan. The Complete Index to Literary Sources in Film. Walter de Gruyter, 1999.
- Wenger, Murielle & Trussel, Stephen. Maigret's World: A Reader's Companion to Simenon's Famous Detective. McFarland, 2017.
