= Camille d'Ornano =

French colonial administrator and diplomat

Camille d'Ornano (4 April 1917 – 2 August 1987) was a French colonial administrator and diplomat. He served as High Commissioner of the French Territory of the Afars and Issas from 1976 to until its independence as Djibouti in 1977. He later served as French Ambassador in Luxembourg.
