= 1977 Afars and Issas Constituent Assembly election =

Constituent Assembly elections were held in the French Territory of the Afars and Issas on 8 May 1977 alongside a referendum on independence. The elections were boycotted by the Djibouti Liberation Movement, the National Union for Independence and the Popular Liberation Movement, resulting in the People's Rally for Independence winning all 65 seats.

== Results ==
Party	Votes	%	Seats	+/–
People's Rally for Independence	75,621	100.00	65	New
Total	75,621	100.00	65	+25
Valid votes	75,621	92.48		
Invalid/blank votes	6,149	7.52		
Total votes	81,770	100.00		
Registered voters/turnout	105,962	77.17		
Source: African Elections Database, Nohlen et al.
