= Barkat Gourad Hamadou =

Former prime minister of Djibouti

Barakat Gourad Hamadou
- بركات غوراد حمادو
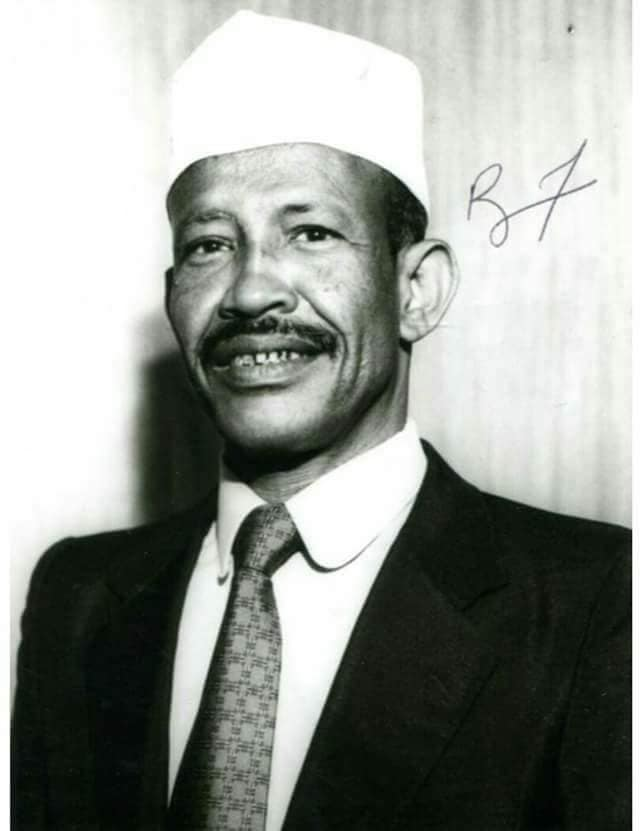

4th Prime Minister of Djibouti
- In office 2 October 1978 – 7 March 2001
- President: Hassan Gouled Aptidon; Ismaïl Omar Guelleh
- Preceded by: Abdallah Mohamed Kamil
- Succeeded by: Dileita Mohamed Dileita

Personal details
- Born: 1 January 1930 Tew'o, French Somaliland (now Djibouti)
- Died: 18 March 2018 (aged 88) Paris, France

Barkat Gourad Hamadou (Arabic: بركات غوراد حمادو; 1 January 1930 – 18 March 2018) was a Djiboutian politician and diplomat who was Prime Minister of Djibouti from 1978 to 2001.

== Political career ==
Prior to Djibouti's independence, Hamadou served in the French Senate; he was first elected as a senator on 26 September 1965 and was re-elected on 22 September 1974. After Djibouti became independent in June 1977, Hamadou served in the government as minister of health. President Hassan Gouled Aptidon then appointed him as prime minister on 30 September 1978, and his first government was formed on 2 October 1978; in addition to serving as prime minister, Hamadou held the Ports portfolio in that government.

Hamadou was the first candidate on the candidate list of the ruling People's Rally for Progress (RPP) for the District of Djibouti in the December 1992 parliamentary election. Following the election, Hamadou was reappointed as prime minister by Gouled on 4 February 1993, with a government composed of Hamadou and 17 other ministers. A peace agreement with the Front for the Restoration of Unity and Democracy (FRUD), an Afar rebel group, was signed in 1994; Hamadou played an important role in this agreement. A new government that included members of FRUD was formed on 8 June 1995. Hamadou remained prime minister in this government and was additionally assigned the development portfolio.

Hamadou was the first candidate on the RPP/FRUD candidate list for the District of Djibouti in the December 1997 parliamentary election. After this election he was again reappointed as prime minister, with a 17-member government (including Hamadou), on 28 December 1997. After Gouled was succeeded by his nephew Ismaïl Omar Guelleh in May 1999, Hamadou was retained as prime minister.

On the night of 9 March 2000, Hamadou was admitted to the French army hospital in Djibouti due to heart trouble. He was then moved to Paris, where he was hospitalized from March to October 2000. Although he was re-elected as vice-president of the RPP in early 2001, he subsequently submitted his resignation as prime minister to President Guelleh on 6 February 2001 due to his declining health. Guelleh accepted his resignation and Hamadou was replaced by Dileita Mohamed Dileita on 7 March 2001. Following his resignation as prime minister, he was made ambassador to the Holy See in December 2001. In 2003, Hamadou resigned as RPP vice-president and was also succeeded in that post by Dileita.

== Personal life and death ==
Hamadou, an ethnic Afar, was born in Tew'o, Dikhil Region, in the southwest of Djibouti. He died 18 March 2018 in Paris, aged 88. President Guelleh offered condolences to his family.

Preceded by Abdallah Mohamed Kamil	Prime Minister of Djibouti; 1978–2001	Succeeded by Dileita Mohamed Dileita
