= Abdallah Mohamed Kamil =

Djiboutian politician

- عبدالله محمد كامل
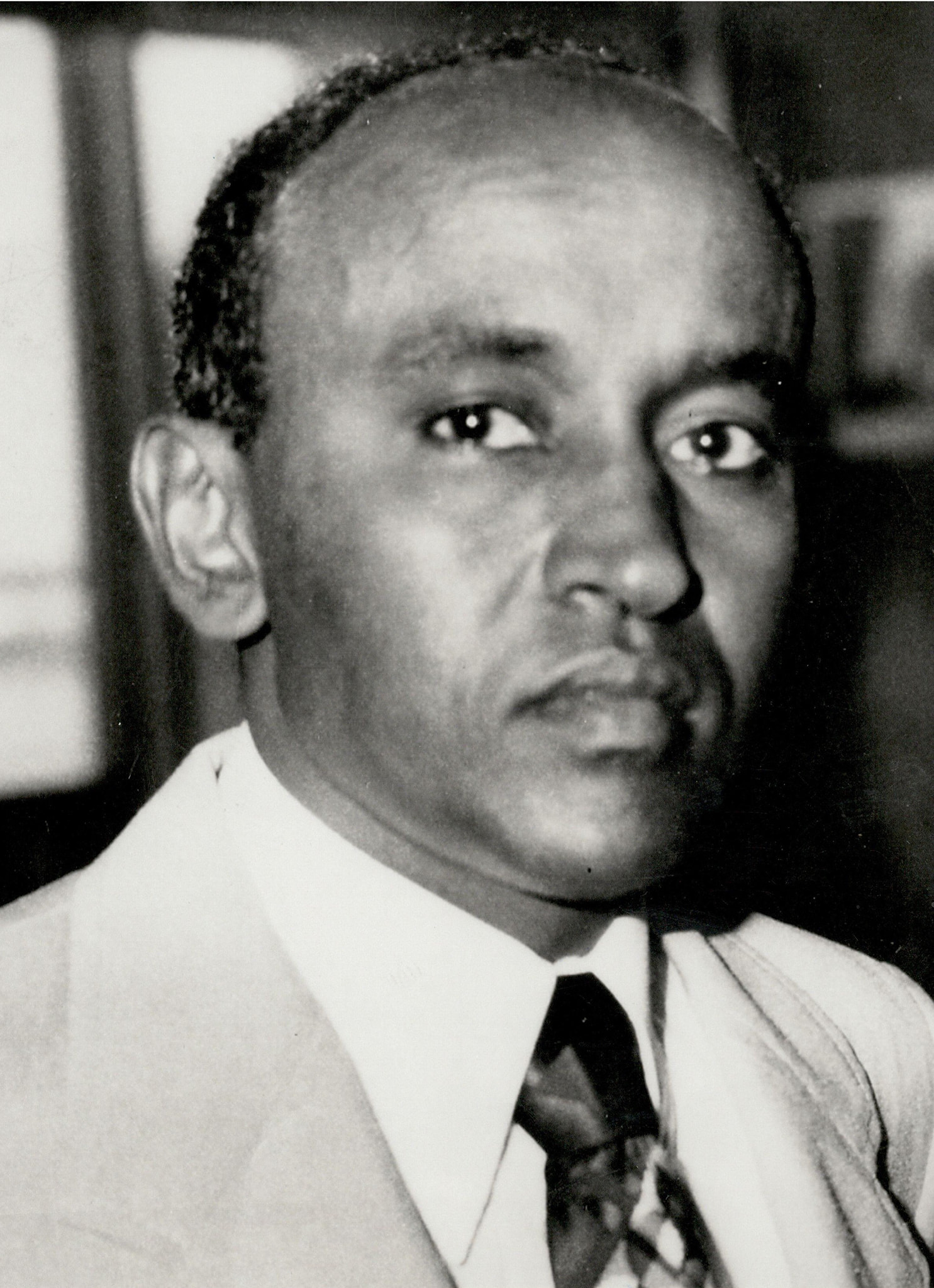
- Abdallah Mohamed Kamil in 1976

3rd Prime Minister of Djibouti
- In office 5 February 1978 – 2 October 1978
- President: Hassan Gouled Aptidon
- Preceded by: Ahmed Dini Ahmed
- Succeeded by: Barkat Gourad Hamadou

2nd President of the Government Council of the French Territory of the Afars and the Issas
- In office 29 July 1976 – 18 May 1977
- Preceded by: Ali Aref Bourhan
- Succeeded by: Office Disestablished

Personal details
- Born: 1936 (age 89–90) Obock, French Somaliland (now Djibouti)

Abdallah Mohamed Kamil (عبد الله محمد كامل; born 1936) is a Djiboutian politician. He served as the third Prime Minister of the country from 5 February 1978 to 2 October 1978.

Kamil holds a diploma from the French institution Sciences Po which he gained in the 1960s. He acted as Secrétaire général du gouvernement in 1974. Prior to Djibouti's independence in 1977, Kamil held the posts President of the Government Council from 29 July 1976 to 18 May 1977. He served as Minister of Foreign Affairs in the first post-independence government, and following the resignation of Prime Minister Ahmed Dini Ahmed, he was appointed as Prime Minister at the head of a new government on 5 February 1978, while remaining Minister of Foreign Affairs and also becoming Minister of Defense. President Hassan Gouled Aptidon dismissed his government on 21 September 1978 and subsequently appointed Barkat Gourad Hamadou to succeed him.

Preceded by Ahmed Dini Ahmed	Prime Minister of Djibouti; 1978	Succeeded by Barkat Gourad Hamadou
