= Dominique Ponchardier =

French author and screenwriter

Dominique Ponchardier (March 3, 1917, Saint-Étienne – April 17, 1986, Nice) was a French author and screenwriter who had been a member of the French Resistance during World War II, and later held positions as an intelligence officer, diplomat, colonial administrator and company president. He was a long-standing follower of Charles de Gaulle, at different times working for him in underground, intelligence, political, civil and diplomatic capacities.

== Early life ==
Born into a family of industrialists, Dominique Ponchardier received his secondary education in Saint-Étienne, Nice and Brest.

=== Anti-Nazi Resistance ===
Ponchardier was doing his military service when World War II broke out. Wounded in the initial part of the war, he avoided being taken prisoner after the Fall of France, for which he later got the Escapees' Medal. He joined the French Resistance in October 1940 - a few months after the beginning of the Nazi occupation. In 1942, he participated in establishing the "Sosie" resistance network, together with his brother Pierre Ponchardier. He ended the war with the rank of Chef de Mission 1st class at the Directorate General of Studies and Research (DGER), the intelligence agency of the Free French Forces.

==== Les Pavés de l'enfer ====
He drew on his experiences to write Les Pavés de l'enfer. It literally translates to "The Cobblestones of Hell" or "The Paving Stones of Hell."

The book received positive reviews from literary critics, with Henri Peyre and Maurice Nadeau ranking it among the notable works on the French Resistance and Occupation. Nadeau praised the author for capturing the "dangerous and cruel climate" of clandestine life without ideological pretense, remarking that Ponchardier's interest in gunfighters signaled his later turn toward crime novels. This view was shared by American scholar Ralph Schoolcraft.

=== Gaullist activist ===
In 1948 he was a member of the board of directors of the RPF, a political movement founded by Charles de Gaulle.

=== Author of spy and detective fiction ===
In 1950, Ponchardier published the memoires of his wartime experiences, Les Pavés de l'enfer (The Cobblestones of Hell). This was followed, between 1954 and 1962, by a successful literary career under the pseudonyms A.L. Dominica and Antoine Dominique. He wrote an extensive series of Spy thrillers/Detective novels featuring a French intelligence operative and detective nicknamed "Le Gorille" ("The Gorilla"). He adapted some of his novels for the cinema.

After 1962 Ponchardier was too busy with various jobs and assignments to continue writing. His literary career resumed much later, in 1978 - his last book being published in 1983.

=== Anti-OAS campaign ===
In the aftermath of the Algerian war, in 1963, Ponchardier was recalled to active service and placed in charge of activities against the OAS. Already earlier, a militia which fought against the OAS with unofficial support from the French government got named "Barbouzes" ("False Beards") - a name invented by Ponchardier and originally appearing in his fiction.

He was also a technical advisor to Michel Maurice-Bokanowski, Minister Of Industry.

=== Diplomat ===
From 1964 to 1968, Ponchardier was the French Ambassador to Bolivia. As such, it was he who negotiated in 1967 the release and expulsion to France of Régis Debray, captured by the Bolivian soldiers while he was leaving the headquarters of revolutionary Che Guevara (who was killed shortly afterwards).

=== Colonial Administrator ===
From 1969 to 1971, Ponchardier was Governor of the French Territory of the Afars and the Issas (today Djibouti). At the time, this was France's last remaining toehold on the African continent, all other African colonies having been granted independence already. At the direction of President De Gaulle and despite international pressure, France was trying to hold on to this last colony, manipulating ethnic divisions between Somali and Afar inhabitants. In his tenure, Ponchardier was confronted with increasingly militant activities by the FLCS ("Front de Libération de la Côte des Somalis", Somali Coast Liberation Front) which in January 1970 claimed an attack on the popular Palm in Zinc, a bar in Djibouti City. Ponchardier's successors would give up attempting to stem the tide of independence, and France would leave Djibouti in 1977.

=== Businessman ===
Ponchardier's last active years were spent in the private sector. From 1971 to 1981, he was President of the Comptoirs français du développement du textile (French company for the development of textile fibers, now Dagris).

=== Death ===
Ponchardier died on April 17, 1986, at Nice.

He is buried in Villefranche-sur-Mer (Alpes-Maritimes).

=== Writings ===
Le Gorille (The Gorilla) series, signed A. L. Dominique or Antoine Dominique
This long-lasting series, running from 1954 to 1961, long interrupted when Ponchardier was otherwise busy and resumed between 1978 and 1983, is Ponchardier's most well-known literary ouvre. It relates the adventures of Geo Paquet, nicknamed The Gorilla for his physique. The books were published in the "Black Series" (Série noire) of Éditions Gallimard, and later by Plon. Fitting with the author's Gaullist sympathies, in Cold War espionage situations French Intelligence operatives are shown as acting in complete independence of - and often in strong aggressive rivalry with - their American and British counterparts, their mutual hostility nearly as strong as vis-a-vis the Soviet spies.

- First Period (1954-1961) (numbers refer to the Série noire, which included many books by other authors)
- Le Gorille vous salue bien, No. 220, Paris, 1954 (Adapted to cinema)
- Gaffe au Gorille !, No. 225, Paris, 1954
- Trois gorilles, No. 231, Paris, 1955
- Gorille sur champ d'azur, No. 236, Paris, 1955
- Le Gorille et le barbu, No. 245, Paris, 1955
- La valse des gorilles, No. 258, Paris, 1955 (Adapted to cinema)
- L'archipel aux Gorilles, No. 265, Paris, 1955
- Le Gorille dans le Pot au noir, No. 269, Paris, 1955
- Le Gorille sans cravate, No. 280, Paris, 1955
- Le Gorille se mange froid, No. 287, Paris, 1955
- Le Gorille en Bourgeois, No. 292, Paris, 1956
- Le Gorille chez les Mandingues, No. 297, Paris, 1956
- Poker Gorille, No. 302, Paris, 1956
- Le Gorille et l'Amazone, No. 307, Paris, 1956
- Le Gorille dans le cocotier, No. 312, Paris, 1956
- Le Gorille compte ses abattis, No. 317, Paris, 1956
- Entre le Gorille et les Corses, No. 322, Paris, 1956
- Couscous Gorille, No. 327, Paris, 1956
- Le Gorille dans la sciure, No. 332, Paris, 1956
- Le Gorille en bretelles, No. 337, Paris, 1956
- Paumé le Gorille !, No. 342, Paris, 1956
- Le Gorille se met à table, No. 347, Paris, 1956
- Le Gorille bille en tête, No. 352, Paris, 1957
- Le Gorille crache le feu, No. 362, Paris, 1957
- Le Gorille dans la verdine, No. 372, Paris, 1957
- Le Gorille au frigo, No. 382, Paris, 1957
- Le Gorille en pétard, No. 387, Paris, 1957
- Le Gorille et les pelouseux, No. 397, Paris, 1957
- Le Gorille sans moustache, No. 407, Paris, 1957
- Le Gorille tatoué, No. 417, Paris, 1958
- Le Gorille chez les parents terribles, No. 427, Paris, 1958
- Le Gorille dans le cirage, No. 437, Paris, 1958
- Le Gorille en révolution, No. 460, Paris, 1958
- Le Pavé du Gorille, No. 471, Paris, 1958
- Le Gorille a du poil au cœur, No. 494, Paris, 1959
- Le Gorille en fleurs, No. 505, Paris, 1959
- Le Gorille en est-il ?, No. 528, Paris, 1959
- Le Gorille a mordu l'archevêque, No. 552, Paris, 1960
- La Peau du Gorille, No. 563, Paris, 1960
- Trois gorilles sur un bateau, No. 577, Paris, 1960
- Le Gorille aux mains d'or, No. 606, Paris, 1960
- Le Gorille et les sociétés secrètes, No. 637, Paris, 1961
- Le Gorille enragé, No. 680, Paris, 1961

- Second Period (1978-1983)
- Oiseaux de nuit, Paris, Plon, coll. Le Gorille No. 1, 1978
- Irish Micmac, Paris, Plon, coll. Le Gorille No. 4, 1978
- Tendre est mon chien cuit, Paris, Plon, coll. Le Gorille No. 6, 1978
- L'African Terror, Paris, Plon, coll. Le Gorille No. 8, 1978
- Apocalypse Bazar, Paris, Plon, coll. Le Gorille No. 9, 1978
- Sweet Lupanar, Paris, Plon, coll. Le Gorille No. 11, 1979
- Dans le baba, Paris, Plon, coll. Le Gorille No. 13, 1979
- Feu au derche, Paris, Plon, coll. Le Gorille No. 15, 1979
- La Buveuse de santé, Paris, Plon, coll. Le Gorille No. 17, 1980
- ...Jusqu'au cou, Paris, Plon, coll. Le Gorille No. 19, 1980
- Le Con pathétique, Paris, Plon, coll. Le Gorille No. 21, 1980
- Semoule et foies blancs, Paris, Plon, coll. Le Gorille No. 23, 1981
- Du sang dans le caviar, Paris, Plon, coll. Le Gorille No. 25, 1981
- Le Gorille et les Corses, Paris, Plon, coll. Le Gorille No. 26, 1981
- Le Gorille paumé dans le soleil, Paris, Plon, coll. Le Gorille No. 27, 1982
- Le Gorille et la mauvaise soupe, Paris, Plon, coll. Le Gorille No. 29, 1982
- Le Gorille et la môme éblouie, Paris, Plon, coll. Le Gorille No. 30, 1982
- Le Gorille et la très grande faute, Paris, Plon, coll. Le Gorille No. 31, 1982
- Le Gorille et l'inconnu aux yeux blancs, Paris, Plon, coll. Le Gorille No. 32, 1983
- Le Gorille chez les Popofs, Paris, Plon, coll. Le Gorille No. 33, 1983
- Le Gorille en cavale, Paris, Plon, coll. Le Gorille No. 34, 1983

Other novels signed Antoine Dominique

- Les Suspects, Paris, Éditions France-Empire, 1957
- Passage à vide, Paris, Gallimard, Série noire No. 449, 1958
- L'Hôtel des Sans-Culottes, Paris, Gallimard, Série noire No. 483, 1959
- Pétrole, Paris, Gallimard, Série noire No. 517, 1959
- Le Manouche, Paris, Gallimard, Série noire No. 541, 1960
- Au poteau, Paris, Gallimard, Série noire No. 592, 1960
- Baobab, Paris, Gallimard, Série noire No. 624, 1961
- Au temps des cerises, Paris, Gallimard, Série noire No. 661, 1961
- Tête-de-fer, Paris, Gallimard, 1963

Novels signed Dominique Ponchardier

- La Dame de Tadjoura, Paris, Gallimard, 1973
- La Mort du Condor, Paris, Gallimard, 1976

Memoires signed Dominique Ponchardier

- Les Pavés de l'enfer, Paris, Gallimard, 1950; republished Paris, J'ai lu Leur aventure No. A48/49, 1969; another variation published 1973 as Les Pavés de l'enfer, la Résistance en France, 1940-1944
- La Dame de Tadjoura (1973)

== Filmography ==
- 1958: Les Suspects (The Suspects) by Jean Dréville with Charles Vanel
- 1959: The Mask of the Gorilla by Bernard Borderie, with Lino Ventura in the title role.
- 1960: La Valse du Gorille by Bernard Borderie, with Roger Hanin in the title role.
- 1961: L'Exécution ('TV') by Maurice Cazeneuve with René Dary
- 1962: Le Gorille a mordu l'archevêque by Maurice Labro, with Roger Hanin in the title role.
- 1990: Le Gorille : TV mini-series with 13 episodes, by (Duccio Tessari, Roger Hanin, Patrick Jamain, Pierre Granier-Deferre, Jean Delannoy...), with Karim Allaoui in the title role, Le Gorille se mange froid

== Decorations ==
- Commander in the Légion d'honneur
- Compagnon de la Libération - decree of 27 December 1945
- Croix de guerre 1939-1945 : (4 citations)
- Médaille de la résistance with a rosette
- Médaille des évadés
- Médaille des Blessés
