= Pierre Pascal =

- Born: 16 April 1909; Mons-en-Barœul, France
- Died: 13 January 1990 (aged 80); Rome, Italy
- Occupations: poet, essayist, iranologist, translator

Pierre Pascal (16 April 1909 – 13 January 1990) was a French poet, essayist, Iranologist and translator.

He was the only son of chemist Paul Pascal.

== Biography ==
In 1933 he began publishing the review Eurydice and founded the publishing firm Éditions du Trident. During the German occupation, he was chief editor for La voix de France and inspector general of radio for the Vichy government, for which he was sentenced in absentia to life imprisonment with penal labor. Left France in 1944 and sought asylum in Italy, in April 1945 at the Vittoriale degli Italiani (in Gardone Riviera, Lombardy) and then in Rome; remained in Roman exile until his death; named chancellor of the Imperial Embassy of Iran to the Holy See. In Rome he founded, with the architect Luigi Moretti, a new publishing firm, Éditions du Cœur fidèle. In 1950 he published a collection of 55 haïkaïses and tankas, In morte di un Samurai, in memory of the general Hideki Tojo, executed for hanging on 23 December 1948. Maurice Delage composed a work for baritone and chamber orchestra based on Pascal's In morte di un Samurai.

Pascal made a French translation – «a work of philological reconstruction» in the personal view of Mario Praz of the Quatrains by Omar Khayyam . The edition is mainly based on a manuscript kept at the University of Cambridge library, along with the Chester Beatty of Dublin (the codex kahyyamien by Mohammad Ali Foroughi) - both of them considered late forgeries- and two manuscripts kept at the Bibliothèque Nationale in Paris.

== Awards ==
- 1935 Prix Paul Verlaine de la Maison de la poésie
- 1936 Prix Saint-Cricq-Theis de l'Académie française pour Dunkerque, croiseur cuirassé
- 1940 Prix Max Barthou de l'Académie française

== Works ==
- Pean naval pour célébrer la naissance du croiseur-cuirassé Dunkerque et son augural baptême, Éditions du Trident (1935)
- Ode liturgique à Paris citadelle des justes arche de paix capitale du royaume, frontispice de Maxime Real Del Sarte, Aux Éditions du Trident (1937)
- Éloge perpétuel de la Sybylle d'Érythrée et de César Auguste, fondateur de l'Empire, Éditions du Trident (1938)
- Pierre Pascal, Chant funèbre pour les cadets de l'Alcazar, Clermont-Ferrand, F. Sorlot (1941)
- Mussolini alla vigilia della sua morte e l'Europa : colloquio con il poeta francese Pierre Pascal (2 aprile 1945), L'arnia (1948)
- In morte di un Samurai; seguito da l'Apologia per un fiore di Camelia bianca, Diamante (1950)
- Le livre de Job: épopée biblique en 42 chapitres, à la gloire de la sainte bienheureuse patience, préface de Gilbert Keith Chesterton, Par les éditions du Cœur fidèle (1967)
- Hanayama, Shinshō, La Voie de l'éternité, Comment surent mourir les criminels de guerre japonais, traduction du japonais et commentaires de Pierre Pascal; Paris, Guy Le Prat, éditeur, 1973.
- Discours sur les abominations de la Nouvelle Église, préface de József Mindszenty, Éditions du Baucens (1976)
- Maurras: Honori et Vindictae Sacrum, Éditions de Chiré (1986)
- Risoluzione aritmetica del Memento mori cifrato di santa Teresa d'Avila. Insieme alla primissima Cantio sanctae Teresiae, Edizioni del Tridente (1978)

== Bibliography ==
- Clouard, Henri (1960). Histoire de la littérature française : du symbolisme a nos jours. A. Michel. p. 196.
