= 1958 French Somaliland constitutional referendum =

A referendum on the new constitution of France was held in French Somaliland on 28 September 1958 as part of a wider referendum held across the French Union. The new constitution would see the country become part of the new French Community if accepted, or result in independence if rejected. It was approved by 75.24% of voters.

== Results ==
The referendum result was in favour of a continued association with France; 75% voted "yes", while 25% were opposed. This was partly due to a combined "yes" vote by the sizable Afar ethnic group and resident Europeans. There were also allegations of widespread vote rigging. According to the UN, there was an inordinate number of invalid ballots in Somali districts, which it suggested implied that the plebiscite had been manipulated. The majority of those who had voted "no" were Somalis who were strongly in favour of joining a united Somalia, as had been proposed by Mahmoud Harbi, then Vice President of the Government Council.

| Choice | Votes | % |
|---|---|---|
| For | 8,662 | 75.24 |
| Against | 2,851 | 24.76 |
| Total | 11,513 | 100.00 |
| Valid votes | 11,513 | 99.40 |
| Invalid/blank votes | 70 | 0.60 |
| Total votes | 11,583 | 100.00 |
| Registered voters/turnout | 15,914 | 72.78 |
Source: Direct Democracy
