= Ali Aref Bourhan =

Djiboutian politician (1934–2025)

- علي عارف برهان
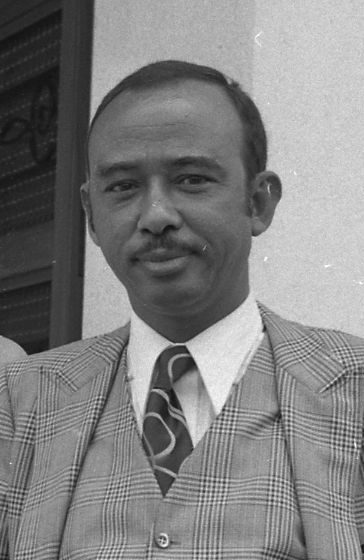
- Bourhan in 1971

1st President of the Government Council of the French Territory of the Afars and the Issas
- In office 7 July 1967 – 29 July 1976
- Preceded by: Position established
- Succeeded by: Abdallah Mohamed Kamil

4th Vice President of the Government Council of French Somaliland
- In office 8 June 1960 – 19 October 1966
- Preceded by: Ahmed Dini Ahmed
- Succeeded by: Abdallah Mohamed Kamil

Personal details
- Born: 1934 Tadjoura, French Somaliland
- Died: 15 December 2025 (aged 91)
- Party: UNI
- Spouse(s): Régine Soulé (m. 1971; div. 1980) Aref Filsane (m. 2014)
- Children: 1

Ali Aref Bourhan (Arabic: علي عارف برهان; 1934 – 15 December 2025) was a Djiboutian politician who served as the 1st President of the Government Council of the French Territory of the Afars and the Issas from 1967 to 1976. Previously, he served as the 4th Vice President of the Government Council of French Somaliland from 1960 to 1966.

== Early life ==
Bourhan was born in 1934 in the coastal city of Tadjoura, situated in eastern present-day Djibouti. He hailed from a prominent local Afar family, the Abourbakers (descendants of Abubakr Ibrahim Chehem). He also has a Gadabursi grandmother from Zeila.

As a young man in the 1950s, Bourhan began his professional career as a teacher. He also ran the town's Afar and Somali youth club.

== Political career ==
Bourhan entered politics under the aegis of Ibrahim Sultan, the then Sultan of Tadjoura. Through the latter, he was introduced to Mahmoud Harbi, the Vice President of the Government Council of French Somaliland and a former comrade of the Sultan in the French army during the World War II campaign. Bourhan would subsequently serve in the territory's representative council as a Harbist politician, strongly supporting Harbi's independence-oriented platform. In 1958, Harbi disappeared from the local political scene, having been exiled to Cairo by the French authorities. He died in a plane crash two years later under mysterious circumstances.

In 1960, with the fall of the ruling Dini administration, Bourhan assumed the seat of Vice President of the Government Council of French Somaliland, representing the UNI party. He would hold that position until 1966. This was because he announced his decision to resign on Radio Djibouti that he would devote himself more fully to preparing for the next referendum that will determine the political future.

In July of the following year, he was elected President of the Government Council of the French Territory of the Afars and the Issas. Bourhan served in that capacity until 29 July 1976, the eve of Djibouti's independence. He was succeeded in office by Abdallah Mohamed Kamil.

== Personal life and death ==
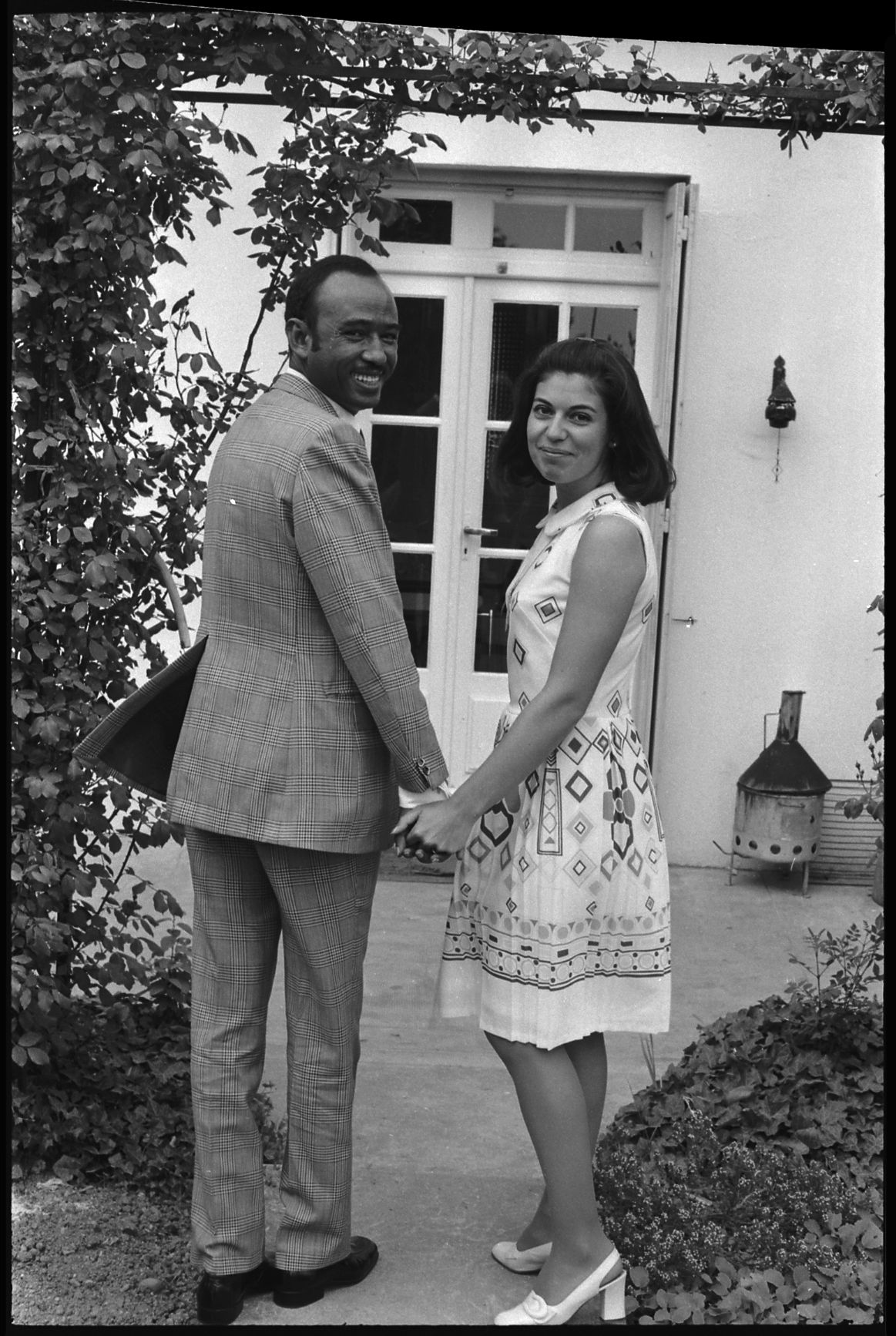
Bourhan and his wife Régine in 1971.

Bourhan married on 15 May 1971, in Carcassonne, to Régine Soulé. They divorced in 1980. He married for a second time, on 14 May 2014, in Kempeski Palace to Aref Filsane. He had a son, Karim Aref Bourhan, who was born in Djibouti on 7 February 1980.

Bourhan died on 15 December 2025, at the age of 91.

== See also ==
- Aussa Sultanate
