= Mahmoud Harbi =

Djiboutian politician

Mahamoud Harbi محمود الحربي

1st Vice President of the Government Council of French Somaliland
- In office 30 July 1957 – 8 December 1958
- Preceded by: Office Established
- Succeeded by: Hassan Gouled Aptidon

Personal details
- Born: c. 1 January 1921 Ali Sabieh, French Somaliland (now Djibouti)
- Died: September 29, 1960 (aged 38–39) Italy
- Party: Republican Union

Mahamoud Harbi Farah (Arabic: محمود الحربي; Somali: Maxamuud Xarbi Faarax) (1921 – 29 September 1960) was a Djiboutian politician of Somali ethnicity. A pan-Somalist, he was the Vice President of the Government Council of French Somaliland from 1957 to December 1958, during Djibouti's pre-independence period.

== Biography ==
Harbi was born in Ali Sabieh, Djibouti in 1921 to a Somali family from the Fourlaba sub-clan of the Issa clan. He learned Arabic and the Quran from a young age. When he was seventeen his father died in 1938. He was forced to work and headed towards the capital Djibouti and worked there as a waiter in one of the restaurants and while he became aware of visitors to the restaurant, most of whom were foreign tourists and benefited from cultural differences. He volunteer, sailor in the French Navy with the brother of the Sultan of Tadjoura, Ibrahim Mohamed in the Second World War. He nearly died when the French warship crashed, which was being served where the Germans in the Mediterranean Sea, but he went to France. He later joined the colonial army, and was awarded the French Croix de Guerre in World War II.

== Political career ==
When he returned to Djibouti in 1946, and began his career working in the port of Djibouti, and then became president of the Union of Somali workers, and in 1947 founded the Democratic Union Party, which branched off from the union, he was able in his youth that dominates the political scene for a decade. He increased his circle of friends in the Middle East through gifts such as the lions he gave to the Imam of Yemen and the King of Saudi Arabia who in return (as is customary) backed him with funds. Harbi's main political rival was Hassan Gouled Aptidon, who in the mid-1950s allegedly expressed a desire to see all foreigners expelled from Djibouti. Harbi capitalized on the blunder by coming to the defense of the foreign communities. As a consequence, he gained the material support of the resident Arabs in general and of Ali Coubeche in particular, son of one of the territory's wealthier merchants. Harbi would later appoint Coubeche as Finance Minister in his Cabinet.

Through the Sultan of Tadjoura, a former comrade in the French army during the World War II campaign, Harbi was introduced to Ali Aref Bourhan, a young Afar politician whom Harbi would eventually take under his wing. Bourhan subsequently served in the territory's representative council as a Harbist politician, strongly supporting Harbi's independence-oriented platform.

In 1958, on the eve of neighboring Somalia's independence in 1960, a referendum was held in French Somaliland to decide whether or not to be an independent country or to remain with France. The plebiscite turned out in favour of a continued association with France, partly due to a combined yes vote by the sizable Afar ethnic group and resident Europeans. There was also widespread vote rigging, with the French expelling thousands of Somalis before the referendum reached the polls. The majority of those who had voted no were Somalis who were strongly in favour of joining a united Somalia, as Harbi had proposed.

== Later years and death ==
Harbi would eventually settle in Mogadishu, where he frequently joined Somali radio programs and preached Pan-Somalism to the Somalis of the Horn of Africa, and traveled to the capitals of African and European nations to seek support for the goal of liberation until his accidental death in an aviation accident. On 29 September 1960, Harbi and his comrades Djama Mahamoud Boreh and Mohamed Gahanlo were killed while traveling from Geneva to Cairo when United Arab Airlines Flight 738 crashed in the Tyrrhenian Sea off of the coast of Italy while on a flight from Geneva to Cairo, killing all 21 people aboard. Speculation that the Organisation armée secrète was involved in causing the crash is unsupported by evidence.

== See also ==
- Greater Somalia
- History of Djibouti
