= French Territory of the Afars and the Issas =

1967–1977 French colony in modern Djibouti

Coordinates: 11°36′N 43°10′E

French Territory of the Afars and the Issas Territoire français des Afars et des Issas (French)
- 1967–1977
- Flag
- Anthem: La Marseillaise
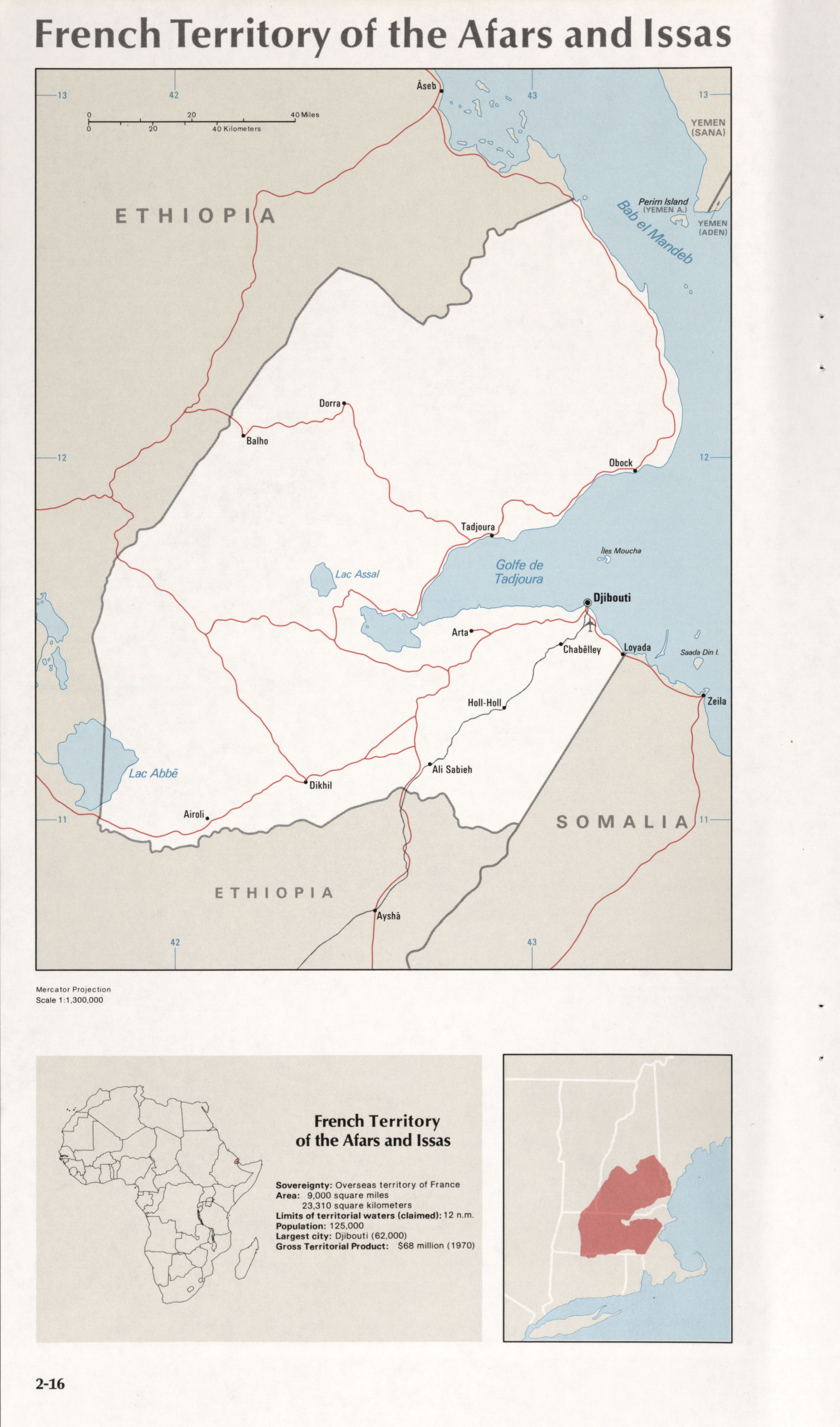
- Status: Overseas territory of France
- Capital: Djibouti
- Common languages: French; Arabic; Somali; Afar
- Religion: Christianity; Islam
- High Commissioner
  - 1967–1969: Louis Saget
  - 1969–1971: Dominique Ponchardier
  - 1971–1973: Georges Thiercy
  - 1973–1975: Christian Dablanc
  - 1975–1977: Camille d'Ornano
- President of the Government Council
  - 1967–1977: List of presidents
- Legislature: Territorial Council
- Historical era: Cold War
  - Established: 5 July 1967
  - Independence: 27 June 1977
- Currency: French Afars and Issas franc
- ISO 3166 code: DJ
| Preceded by | Succeeded by |
| French Somaliland | Djibouti |
- Today part of: Djibouti

The French Territory of the Afars and the Issas (FTAI; French: Territoire français des Afars et des Issas, TFAI) was the name given to present-day Djibouti between 1967 and 1977, while it was still an overseas territory of France. The area was formerly known as French Somaliland (Côte française des Somalis). Its name derives from the Afar people of Djibouti and the Somali Issa clan.

== History ==
From 1862 until 1894, the land to the north of the Gulf of Tadjoura was called Obock and ruled by Somali and Afar Sultans, local authorities with whom France signed various treaties between 1883 and 1887 to gain a foothold in the region. In 1894, Léonce Lagarde established a permanent French administration in the city of Djibouti and named the region Côte française des Somalis (French Somaliland), a name which continued until 1967.

In 1958, on the eve of neighbouring Somalia's independence in 1960, a referendum was held in the territory to decide whether or not to join the Somali Republic or to remain with France. The referendum turned out in favour of a continued association with France, partly due to a combined yes vote by the sizable Afar ethnic group and resident Europeans. There were also allegations of widespread vote rigging. The majority of those who had voted no were Somalis who were strongly in favour of joining a united Somalia, as had been proposed by Mahmoud Harbi, Vice President of the Government Council. In October 1960, he and several of his associates died in a plane crash under mysterious circumstances on a return trip from China to Somalia.

In 1966, France rejected the United Nations recommendation that it should grant French Somaliland independence. In August of the same year, an official visit to the territory by then French President, General Charles de Gaulle, was also met with demonstrations and rioting. In response to the protests, de Gaulle ordered another referendum.

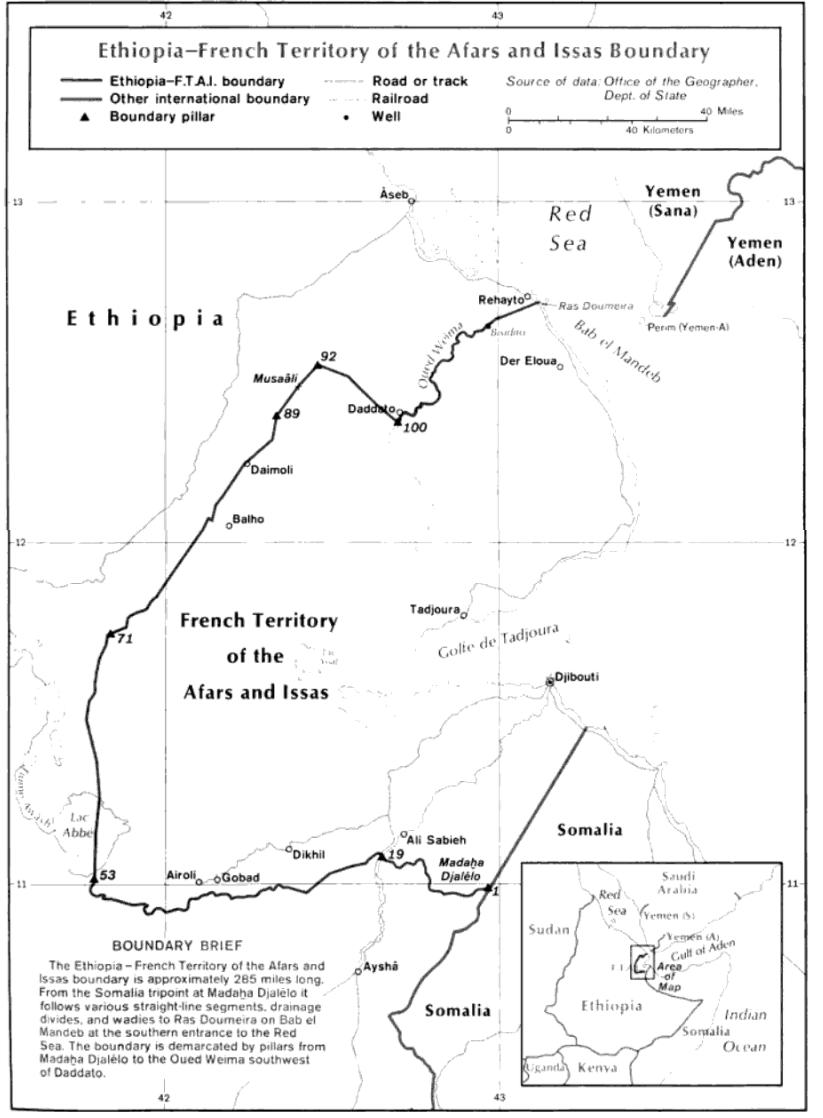
Map of the FTAI–Ethiopia border, 1977; much of it was marked with boundary pillars.

On 19 March 1967, a second plebiscite was held to determine the fate of the territory. Initial results supported a continued but looser relationship with France. Voting was also divided along ethnic lines, with the resident Somalis generally voting for independence, with the goal of eventual reunion with Somalia, and the Afars largely opting to remain associated with France. However, the referendum was again marred by reports of vote rigging on the part of the French authorities, with some 10,000 Somalis deported under the pretext that they did not have valid identity cards. According to the UN, there was an inordinate number of invalid ballots in Somali districts, which implied that the plebiscite had been manipulated. Although the territory was at the time inhabited by 58,240 Somali and 48,270 Afar, official figures indicated that only 14,689 Somali were allowed to register to vote versus 22,004 Afar. Somali representatives also charged that the French had simultaneously imported thousands of Afar nomads from neighbouring Ethiopia to further tip the odds in their favor, but the French authorities denied this, suggesting that Afars already greatly outnumbered Somalis on the voting lists. Announcement of the plebiscite results sparked civil unrest, including several deaths. France also increased its military force along the frontier. In 1967, shortly after the referendum was held, French Somaliland was renamed Territoire français des Afars et des Issas. This was both in acknowledgement of the large Afar constituency and to downplay the significance of the Somali composition (the Issa being a Somali subclan).

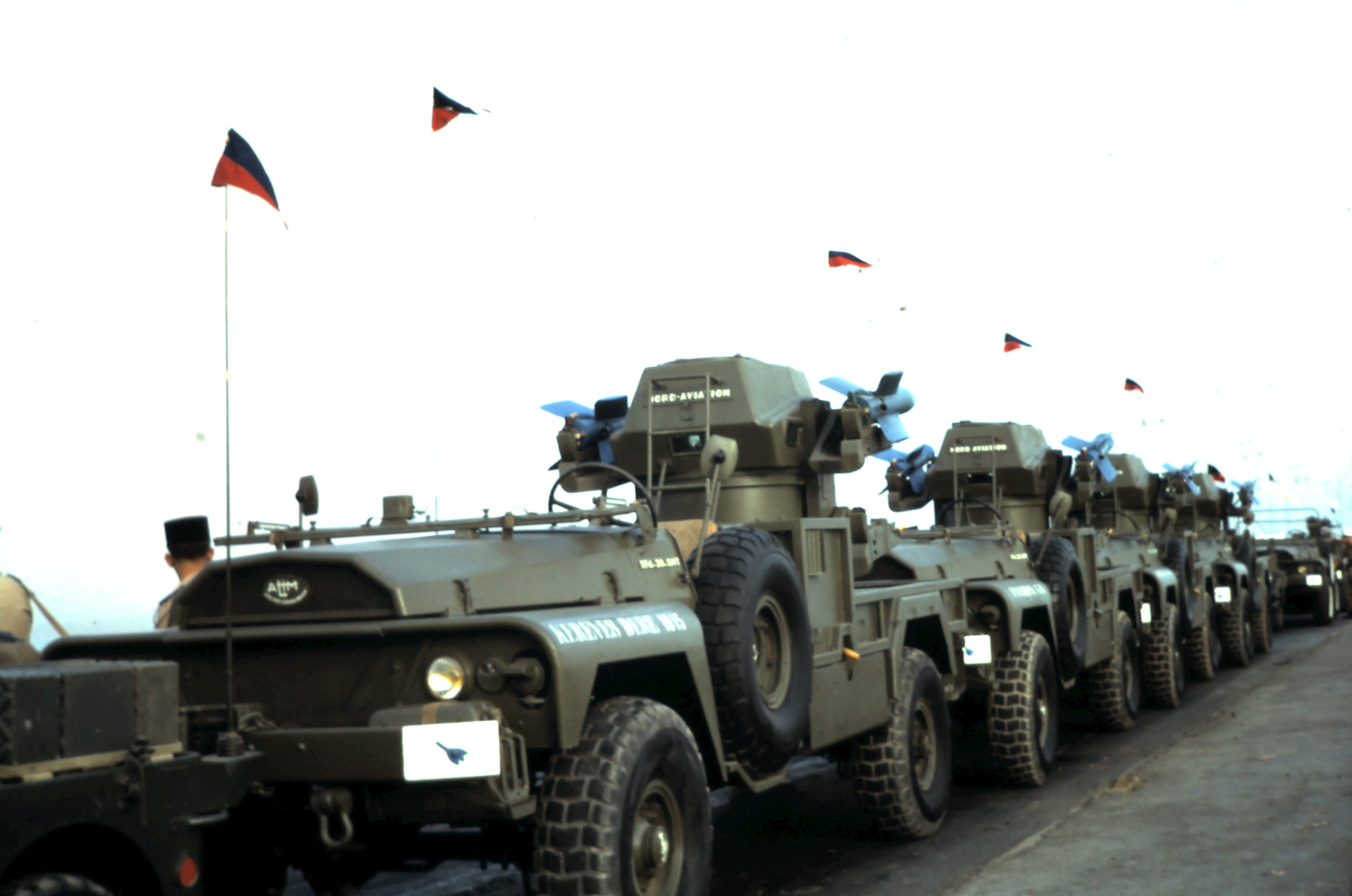
French VLRA SS.11 platoon in Djibouti City, Bastille Day 1971.

The French Territory of Afars and Issas also differed from French Somaliland in terms of government structure, as the position of Governor General changed to that of High Commissioner. A nine-member council of government was also implemented.

With a steadily enlarging Somali population, the likelihood of a third referendum appearing successful for the French had grown even dimmer. The prohibitive cost of maintaining the colony, France's last outpost on the continent, was another factor that compelled observers to doubt that the French would attempt to hold on to the territory.

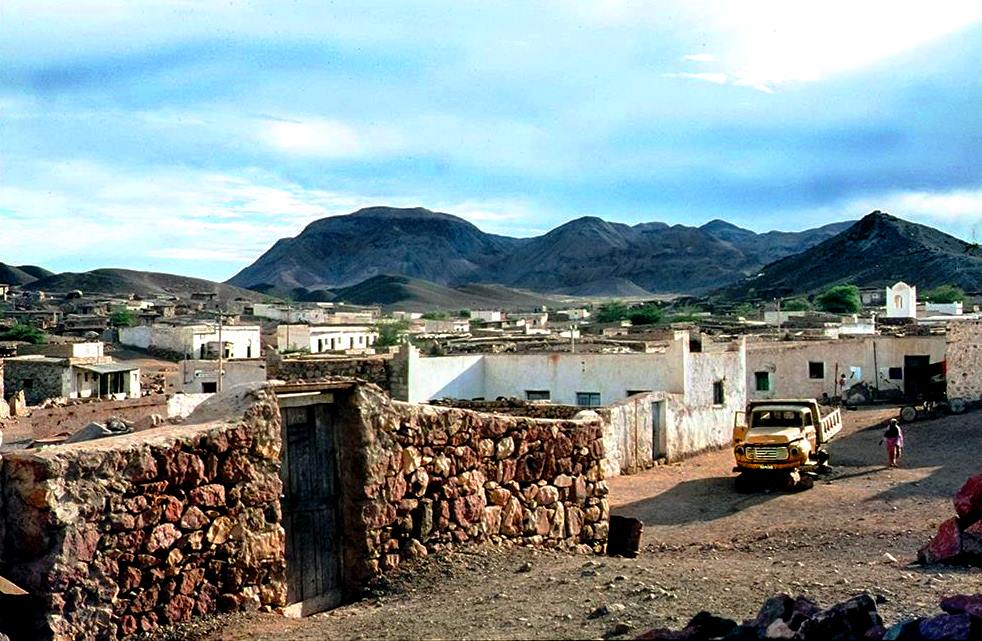
The town of Ali Sabieh in 1970

On 8 May 1977, a third vote took place. A landslide 99.8% of the electorate supported disengagement from France, officially marking Djibouti's independence. Hassan Gouled Aptidon, a Somali politician who had campaigned for a yes vote in the referendum of 1958, eventually wound up as the nation's first president (1977–1999).

== See also ==
- List of governors of French Somaliland
- List of French possessions and colonies
- French colonial empire
