= Lists of office-holders =

These are lists of incumbents (individuals holding offices or positions), including heads of states or of subnational entities.

A historical discipline, archontology, focuses on the study of past and current office holders.

Incumbents may also be found in the countries' articles (main article and "politics of") and the list of national leaders, recent changes in 2024 in politics and government, and past leaders on state leaders by year and colonial governors by century.

Various articles group lists by title, function or topic: e.g. abdication, assassinated persons, cabinet (government), chancellor, ex-monarchs (20th century), head of government, head of state, lieutenant governor, mayor, military commanders, minister (and ministers by portfolio below), order of precedence, peerage, president, prime minister, Reichstag participants (1792), secretary of state.

== Heads of international organizations ==
- President of the European Council
- President of the European Commission
- Secretary-General of the United Nations
- United Nations High Commissioner for Refugees
- International Monetary Fund
- Director-General of the World Trade Organization
- Secretary General of NATO
- FIFA presidents
- President of the International Olympic Committee

== Heads of state or government ==
=== Africa ===
==== Eastern Africa ====
- Burundi:
  - List of presidents of Burundi
  - Vice-Presidents of Burundi
  - List of current Burundian governors
- Comoros:
  - Heads of state
  - Governor of Grande Comore
- Kenya:
  - List of heads of state of Kenya
  - Deputy Presidents of Kenya
- Madagascar:
  - List of presidents of Madagascar
  - Prime Ministers of Madagascar
  - Vice Presidents of Madagascar
- Malawi
  - List of heads of state of Malawi
  - Vice-Presidents of Malawi
- Mauritius
  - List of heads of state of Mauritius
  - List of prime ministers of Mauritius
- Mozambique
  - List of presidents of Mozambique
  - List of prime ministers of Mozambique
  - Vice-Presidents of Mauritius
- Rwanda
  - List of presidents of Rwanda
  - Prime Minister of Rwanda
  - Vice Presidents of Rwanda
- Seychelles
  - List of presidents of Seychelles
  - Vice-President of Seychelles
- Tanzania
  - List of heads of state of Tanzania
  - List of prime ministers of Tanzania
  - Vice-Presidents of Tanzania
  - Presidents of Zanzibar
  - List of heads of government of Zanzibar
- Uganda
  - List of heads of state of Uganda
  - Prime Ministers of Uganda
  - Vice Presidents of Uganda
- Zambia
  - Presidents of Zambia
  - Vice-Presidents of Zambia
- Zimbabwe
  - Presidents of Zimbabwe
  - Vice-Presidents of Zimbabwe

==== Horn of Africa ====
- Djibouti:
  - Lists of rulers of Djibouti
  - List of prime ministers of Djibouti
- Eritrea:
  - List of heads of state of Eritrea
- Ethiopia:
  - List of presidents of Ethiopia
  - List of heads of government of Ethiopia
- Somalia:
  - List of presidents of Somalia
  - List of prime ministers of Somalia
  - List of speakers of the Parliament of Somalia
- Somaliland:
  - List of presidents of Somaliland
  - VIce Presidents of Somaliland
  - List of presidents of Puntland
  - Vice Presidents of Puntland

==== Middle Africa ====
- Angola
  - List of presidents of Angola
  - List of prime ministers of Angola
  - Vice Presidents of Angola
  - Cabinet of Angola
- Cameroon
  - List of presidents of Cameroon
  - List of prime ministers of Cameroon
- Central African Republic
  - List of heads of state of the Central African Republic
  - List of heads of government of the Central African Republic
- Chad
  - List of heads of state of Chad
  - List of prime ministers of Chad
- Congo, Democratic Republic of the (Zaire/'Congo-Kinshasa')
  - List of presidents of the Democratic Republic of the Congo
  - List of prime ministers of the Democratic Republic of the Congo
- Congo, Republic of the (Congo-Brazzaville)
  - List of presidents of the Republic of the Congo
  - List of prime ministers of the Republic of the Congo
- Equatorial Guinea
  - List of presidents of Equatorial Guinea
  - List of prime ministers of Equatorial Guinea
- Gabon
  - Presidents of Gabon
  - Prime Ministers of Gabon
- São Tomé and Príncipe
  - List of presidents of São Tomé and Príncipe
  - List of prime ministers of São Tomé and Príncipe
  - List of presidents of the Regional Government of Príncipe

==== Northern Africa ====
- Algeria
  - List of heads of state of Algeria
  - List of heads of government of Algeria
- Egypt
  - Lists of rulers of Egypt
  - List of presidents of Egypt
  - List of prime ministers of Egypt
- Libya
  - List of heads of state of Libya
  - List of heads of government of Libya
- Morocco
  - List of rulers of Morocco
  - List of heads of government of Morocco
  - Cabinet of Morocco
  - Prime Minister of the Sahrawi Arab Democratic Republic
  - President of the Sahrawi Arab Democratic Republic
- Sudan
  - List of heads of state of Sudan
  - List of heads of government of Sudan
  - Vice Presidents of Sudan
- South Sudan
  - List of heads of state of South Sudan
  - Vice Presidents of South Sudan
- Tunisia
  - List of presidents of Tunisia
  - List of prime ministers of Tunisia

==== Southern Africa ====
- Botswana
  - Presidents of Botswana
- Eswatini
  - List of monarchs of Eswatini
  - List of prime ministers of Eswatini
- Lesotho
  - Kings of Lesotho
  - List of prime ministers of Lesotho
- Namibia
  - Presidents of Namibia
  - Prime ministers of Namibia
- South Africa
  - List of heads of state of South Africa
  - List of current premiers of South Africa

==== Western Africa ====
- Benin
  - List of presidents of Benin
- Burkina Faso
  - List of heads of state of Burkina Faso
  - List of prime ministers of Burkina Faso
- Cape Verde
  - List of presidents of Cape Verde
  - List of prime ministers of Cape Verde
- Ivory Coast
  - List of heads of state of Ivory Coast
  - Prime Ministers of the Gambia
- The Gambia
  - List of heads of state of the Gambia
  - Heads of government of the Gambia
- Ghana
  - List of heads of state of Ghana
- Guinea
  - List of presidents of Guinea
  - List of prime ministers of Guinea
- Guinea-Bissau
  - List of presidents of Guinea-Bissau
  - List of prime ministers of Guinea-Bissau
- Liberia
  - President of Liberia#List of officeholders
- Mali
  - List of heads of state of Mali
  - List of prime ministers of Mali
- Mauritania
  - List of heads of state of Mauritania
  - List of prime ministers of Mauritania
- Niger
  - List of heads of state of Niger
  - List of prime ministers of Niger
- Nigeria
  - List of heads of state of Nigeria
- Senegal
  - President of Senegal
- Sierra Leone
  - List of heads of state of Sierra Leone
  - List of heads of government of Sierra Leone
- Togo
  - List of presidents of Togo
  - List of prime ministers of Togo

=== Americas ===
==== Caribbean ====
- Antigua and Barbuda
  - Governors-General of Antigua and Barbuda
  - List of prime ministers of Antigua and Barbuda
- Bahamas
  - Governors-General of the Bahamas
  - List of heads of government of the Bahamas
  - Colonial heads of the Bahamas
- Barbados
  - List of heads of state of Barbados
  - List of prime ministers of Barbados
- Cuba
  - First secretaries of the Communist Party of Cuba
  - List of heads of state of Cuba
  - List of heads of government of Cuba
- Dominica
  - List of presidents of Dominica
  - List of heads of government of Dominica
- Dominican Republic
  - List of presidents of the Dominican Republic
- Grenada
  - Governors-general of Grenada
  - List of heads of government of Grenada
- Haiti
  - List of heads of state of Haiti
- Jamaica
  - Governor-General of Jamaica#List of governors-general of Jamaica
  - Prime ministers of Jamaica
- Saint Kitts and Nevis
  - Governors-general of Saint Kitts and Nevis
  - List of prime ministers of Saint Kitts and Nevis
  - Premiers of Nevis
- Saint Lucia
  - Governors-general of Saint Lucia
  - List of prime ministers of Saint Lucia
- Saint Vincent and the Grenadines
  - Governors-general of Saint Vincent and the Grenadines
  - List of prime ministers of Saint Vincent and the Grenadines
- Trinidad and Tobago
  - List of heads of state of Trinidad and Tobago
  - List of prime ministers of Trinidad and Tobago

==== Central America ====
- Belize
  - Governors-general of Belize
  - Prime ministers of Belize
- Costa Rica
  - List of presidents of Costa Rica
  - List of presidents of the Legislative Assembly of Costa Rica
  - List of presidents of the Supreme Court of Costa Rica
- El Salvador
  - Presidents of El Salvador
- Guatemala
  - Presidents of Guatemala
- Honduras
  - List of presidents of Honduras
- Nicaragua
  - Heads of state of Nicaragua
- Panama
  - List of heads of state of Panama
  - Vice President of Panama

==== North America ====
- Canada
  - Office-holders of Canada
- Mexico
  - List of heads of state of Mexico
- United States
  - Office-holders of the United States

==== South America ====
- Argentina
  - List of heads of state of Argentina
- Bolivia
  - List of presidents of Bolivia
- Brazil
  - Presidents of Brazil
    - Governors of Distrito Federal
    - Governors of Minas Gerais
      - Mayors of Belo Horizonte
    - Governors of Rio de Janeiro
      - Mayors of Rio de Janeiro
    - Governors of São Paulo
- Chile
  - Presidents of Chile
    - Governors of Cardenal Caro
      - Mayors of Pichilemu
  - Kings of Easter Island
- Colombia
  - Presidents of Colombia
    - List of governors of Quindío Department
- Ecuador
  - Presidents of Ecuador
- Guyana
  - Governors-general of Guyana
  - Presidents of Guyana
  - Prime ministers of Guyana
- Paraguay
  - Presidents of Paraguay
- Peru
  - Presidents of Peru
- Suriname
  - Presidents of Suriname
- Uruguay
  - Presidents of Uruguay
- Venezuela
  - Presidents of Venezuela

=== Asia ===
==== Central Asia ====
- Kazakhstan
  - Presidents of Kazakhstan
  - Prime Ministers of Kazakhstan
- Kyrgyzstan
  - Presidents of Kyrgyzstan
- Tajikistan
  - Presidents of Tajikistan
- Turkmenistan
  - Presidents of Turkmenistan
- Uzbekistan
  - Presidents of Uzbekistan

==== Eastern Asia ====
- China (PRC)
  - General Secretary of the Chinese Communist Party (paramount leader)
  - President of China
  - Premier of China
  - Chairman of the Standing Committee of the National People's Congress
  - Chairman of the National Committee of the Chinese People's Political Consultative Conference
  - Politburo Standing Committee of the Chinese Communist Party
  - Hong Kong
    - Governor of Hong Kong (under British rule, now replaced by Chief Executive)
    - Chief Executive of Hong Kong
  - Macau
    - Governor of Macau (under Portuguese rule, now replaced by Chief Executive)
    - Chief Executive of Macau
  - Tibet
    - List of imperial ambans in Tibet
- Republic of China (Taiwan)
  - President of the Republic of China
  - Premier of the Republic of China
  - Governors and chairpersons of Taiwan, see Taiwan Province
- Japan
  - List of rulers of Japan (emperors, regents, shōguns and prime ministers)
  - List of prime ministers of Japan
- Mongolia
  - List of heads of state of Mongolia
  - List of prime ministers of Mongolia
- North Korea
  - First Secretary of the Workers' Party of Korea (supreme leader)
  - Heads of state of North Korea
  - Premiers of North Korea
- South Korea
  - Presidents of South Korea
  - Prime ministers of South Korea

==== Southeastern Asia ====
- Brunei
  - List of sultans of Brunei
- Cambodia
  - List of heads of state of Cambodia
  - List of prime ministers of Cambodia
- Indonesia
  - Presidents of Indonesia
  - Vice Presidents of Indonesia
- Laos
  - General Secretary of the Lao People's Revolutionary Party (de facto leader)
  - Presidents of Laos
  - Prime ministers of Laos
- Malaysia
  - Yang di-Pertuan Agong
  - Prime ministers of Malaysia
- Myanmar
  - Kings of Myanmar
  - Presidents of Myanmar
  - Prime ministers of Myanmar
  - State Counsellor of Myanmar
- Philippines
  - Presidents of the Philippines
  - List of sovereign state leaders in the Philippines
- Singapore
  - President of Singapore
  - Prime Minister of Singapore
- Thailand
  - Kings of Thailand
  - Chakri dynasty
  - Kings of Ayutthaya, see Ayutthaya kingdom
  - Kings of Haripunchai, see Haripunchai
  - Kings of Lanna, see Lanna
  - Kings of Sukhothai, see Sukhothai kingdom
  - Prime ministers of Thailand
  - Presidents of the National Assembly of Thailand
  - Leaders of the Opposition of Thailand
  - Governors of Bangkok
- Timor-Leste
  - Presidents of Timor-Leste
  - Prime ministers of Timor-Leste
- Vietnam
  - Vietnamese dynasties
  - Kings of Vietnam
  - General Secretary of the Communist Party of Vietnam (de facto leader)
  - President of Vietnam
  - Prime Minister of Vietnam
  - Chairman of National Assembly of Vietnam

==== South Asia ====
- Afghanistan
  - Afghan Transitional Administration personnel
  - Prime ministers of Afghanistan
    - Rulers of Kabul
    - Rulers of Herat
    - Rulers of Kandahar
    - Rulers of Peshawar
  - Ghaznavid emperors, see Ghaznavid Empire
  - Kabul Shahi dynasty
    - Turk Shahi dynasty
    - Hindu Shahi dynasty
- Bangladesh
  - Presidents of Bangladesh
  - Prime ministers of Bangladesh
- Bhutan
  - Kings of Bhutan
  - Prime ministers of Bhutan
- India
  - List of Indian monarchs
  - List of prime ministers of India
  - Governors, lieutenant governors and administrators of Indian states and union territories
  - Chief ministers of Indian states
- Maldives
  - Sultans of the Maldives
  - Presidents of the Maldives
  - List of heads of state of the Maldives
  - List of vice presidents of the Maldives
- Nepal
  - List of monarchs of Nepal
  - Prime ministers of Nepal
- Pakistan
  - Presidents of Pakistan
  - Prime ministers of Pakistan
- Sri Lanka
  - Presidents of Sri Lanka
  - Prime ministers of Sri Lanka

==== Western Asia ====
- Armenia
  - Kings of Urartu
  - List of Armenian monarchs
  - Kings of Kommagene
  - Shaddadid dynasty
  - President of Armenia
  - Prime Minister of Armenia
- Azerbaijan
  - Arsacid dynasty of Caucasian Albania
  - Mihranids
  - Presidents of Azerbaijan
  - Prime ministers of Azerbaijan
  - Presidents of the Nagorno-Karabakh Republic
- Bahrain
  - Monarchs of Bahrain
- Cyprus
  - Kings of Cyprus
    - Officers of the Kingdom of Cyprus
  - Presidents of Cyprus
  - Presidents of Northern Cyprus
  - Prime ministers of Northern Cyprus
- Georgia
  - Lists of Georgian monarchs
  - Colchis
  - Kingdom of Abkhazia
    - Divan of the Abkhazian Kings
  - List of sovereigns of Kakheti
  - Kingdom of Imereti
    - Gurieli
  - Emirs of Tbilisi
  - List of leaders of Georgia
  - Prime Minister of Georgia
  - Chairman of the Government of Adjara
  - Presidents of Abkhazia
  - Prime ministers of Abkhazia
  - Presidents of South Ossetia
  - Prime ministers of South Ossetia
- Iran
  - List of heads of state of Iran
  - List of monarchs of Persia
  - Supreme Leader of Iran
  - List of presidents of Iran
  - List of premiers of Iran
  - List of prime ministers of Iran
- Iraq
  - Sumer
    - List of Mesopotamian dynasties
  - Akkad
    - Kings of Akkad
  - Gutian kings
  - Kings of Assyria
  - Kings of Babylon
  - Rulers of Adiabene
  - Abbasid Caliphs
  - Annazid dynasty
  - Kings of Iraq
  - Presidents of Iraq
  - Prime ministers of Iraq
  - Civilian Administrator of Iraq
- Israel
  - Prime Minister of Israel
  - President of Israel
  - Rulers of Israel and Judah
  - Kings of Israel
  - Kings of Judah
  - High priests of Israel
  - Crusader States
  - Kings of Jerusalem
    - Vassals of the Kingdom of Jerusalem
      - Princes of Galilee
        - Lords of Toron
      - Counts of Jaffa and Ascalon
        - Lords of Ramla
        - Lords of Ibelin
      - Lords of Oultrejordain
      - Lords of Sidon
    - Officers of the Kingdom of Jerusalem
  - Presidents of the Palestinian National Authority
  - Prime ministers of the Palestinian National Authority
- Jordan (formerly Transjordan)
  - Kings of Jordan
  - Rulers of Nabatea
- Kuwait
  - Emirs of Kuwait
  - Al-Sabah
- Lebanon
  - Presidents of Lebanon
  - Prime ministers of Lebanon
  - Speakers of the Parliament of Lebanon
- Oman (formerly Muscat (and Oman))
  - Sultans of Oman
- Qatar
  - Emirs of Qatar
- Saudi Arabia
  - Sharif of Mecca
  - Kings of Saudi Arabia
- Syria
  - Presidents of Syria
  - Prime ministers of Syria
  - Kings of Syria
  - Osroene
  - Rulers of Damascus
  - Zengid dynasty
  - Counts of Edessa
  - Princes of Antioch
    - Officers of the Principality of Antioch
  - Emirs of Shaizar
  - Ghassanid kings
  - Rulers of Aleppo
  - Hanilgalbat: Kings of Hanilgabat, see Hanilgalbat and Mitanni
  - Kings of Ugarit
- Turkey
  - List of Hittite kings
  - Kings of Arzawa
  - Kings of Lydia
  - Kings of Bithynia
  - Kings of Cappadocia
  - Attalid Kings of Pergamon
  - Kings of Pontus
    - Pharnacid Dynasty
  - Kings of Galatia
  - Byzantine emperors
    - Tetrarchy
  - List of Latin emperors
  - Empire of Trebizond
  - Seljuk sultans of Rüm
  - Anatolian beyliks
  - List of sultans of the Ottoman Empire
  - Prime ministers of Turkey
  - Presidents of Turkey
- United Arab Emirates
  - Prime ministers of the United Arab Emirates
  - Presidents of the United Arab Emirates
- Yemen
  - Presidents of Yemen
  - Prime ministers of Yemen
  - Presidents of North Yemen
  - Prime ministers of North Yemen
  - Presidents of South Yemen
  - Prime ministers of South Yemen

=== Europe ===
==== Eastern Europe ====
- Belarus
- Moldova
  - Presidents of Moldova
  - Prime ministers of Moldova
  - Governors of Gagauzia
  - Presidents of Transnistria
  - Prime ministers of Transnistria
- Romania
  - Dacian kings
  - Rulers of Wallachia
  - Rulers of Moldavia
  - Rulers of Transylvania
  - List of heads of state of Romania
  - Prime ministers of Romania
- Russia and the Soviet Union
  - List of Russian monarchs
  - Leaders of the Soviet Union
  - President of the Soviet Union
  - Premier of the Soviet Union
  - Presidents of Russia
  - Prime ministers of Russia
  - Khans of the Golden Horde
  - List of Kazan khans
  - List of Khazar rulers
  - Rulers of Kievan Rus'
  - Grand Prince of Tver
- Ukraine
  - Rulers of Kievan Rus'
  - List of rulers of Halych and Volhynia
  - Hetmans of Ukrainian Cossacks
  - List of Crimean khans
  - Presidents of Ukraine
  - Prime ministers of Ukraine

==== Northern Europe ====
- Denmark
  - Danish monarchs
  - Prime ministers of Denmark
  - List of legendary kings of Denmark
  - Faroe Islands
    - Prime ministers of the Faroe Islands
  - Greenland
    - Prime ministers of Greenland
    - Governors of Greenland
    - Inspectors of Greenland
- Estonia
  - Estonian rulers
  - Heads of government of Estonia
  - Presidents of Estonia
  - State elders of Estonia
- Finland
  - Prime ministers of Finland
  - Presidents of Finland
  - Finnish rulers
  - Provincial Governors of Finland
  - Premiers of Åland
- Iceland
  - Presidents of Iceland
  - Prime ministers of Iceland
  - Icelandic rulers
  - List of lawspeakers, see Lawspeaker
- Ireland: Rulers of Ireland
- Latvia
  - Presidents of Latvia
  - Prime ministers of Latvia
- Lithuania
  - List of Lithuanian rulers
  - Presidents of Lithuania
  - Prime ministers of Lithuania
- Norway
  - Norwegian monarchs
    - Line of succession to the Norwegian Throne
  - Legendary kings of Norway
  - Norwegian prime ministers
- Sweden
  - Swedish monarchs
  - Prime ministers of Sweden
  - Swedish field marshals
  - County governors of Sweden
  - Swedish semi-legendary kings
  - Mythological kings of Sweden
  - Kings of Geatland
- Blekinge governors
- Dalarna governors
- Gävleborg governors
- Gotland governors
- Halland governors
- Jämtland governors
- Jönköping governors
- Kalmar governors
- Kronoberg governors
- Norrbotten governors
- Skåne governors
- Stockholm governors
- Södermanland governors
- Uppsala governors
- Värmland governors
- Västerbotten governors
- Västernorrland governors
- Västmanland governors
- Västra Götaland governors
- Örebro governors
- Östergötland governors
- United Kingdom: List of office-holders of the United Kingdom and predecessor states

==== Central Europe ====
- Austria
  - Rulers of Austria
  - Emperors of Austria
  - Foreign ministers of Austria-Hungary
  - Minister-presidents of Austria
  - Federal presidents of Austria
  - Chancellors of Austria (Vice chancellors of Austria)
  - Habsburg
  - Babenberg
  - Margraves, dukes, and archdukes of Austria
  - Dukes of Styria, see Styria (duchy)
  - Dukes of Carinthia, see Carinthia (duchy)
- Czech Republic
  - Rulers of Bohemia (Czech lands)
  - List of presidents of Czechoslovakia
  - List of prime ministers of Czechoslovakia
  - List of rulers of the Protectorate Bohemia and Moravia
  - Presidents of the Czech Republic
  - Prime ministers of the Czech Republic
- Germany: Rulers of Germany
- Hungary
  - List of Hungarian rulers
  - List of heads of state of Hungary
  - Prime ministers of Hungary
- Liechtenstein
  - Princes of Liechtenstein
  - Liechtenstein heads of government
- Poland
  - Polish rulers
  - Dukes of Silesia
  - Dukes of Mazovia
  - Dukes of Greater Poland
  - Dukes of Łęczyca
  - Dukes of Sieradz
  - Duchy of Cieszyn
  - Dukes of Pomerania
  - List of prime ministers of Poland
  - List of Polish presidents
- Slovakia
  - Presidents of Slovakia
  - Prime ministers of Slovakia
  - Parliament leaders of Slovakia
- Switzerland
  - Members of the Swiss Federal Council
    - Presidents of the Confederation
    - Heads of the Department of Defence, Civil Protection and Sports, see Military of Switzerland
    - Heads of the Department of Foreign Affairs: see International relations of Switzerland
    - Heads of the Department of Home Affairs
    - Heads of the Federal Department of Finance
    - Heads of the Federal Department of Environment, Transport, Energy and Communications
    - Heads of the Federal Department of Economic Affairs
    - Heads of the Federal Department of Justice and Police
  - Federal chancellors of Switzerland
  - Presidents of the Swiss National Council
  - Presidents of the Swiss Council of States
  - Members of the Swiss National Council
  - Members of the Swiss Council of States
  - Presidents of the Swiss Diet (before 1848)

==== Southern Europe ====
- Albania
  - List of rulers of Illyria
  - Monarchs of Albania
  - Prime ministers of Albania
  - Presidents of Albania
- Andorra
  - Co-princes of Andorra
    - Bishop of Urgell
  - Prime ministers of Andorra
- Bosnia and Herzegovina
  - Rulers of Bosnia
  - Members of the Presidency of Bosnia and Herzegovina
  - Heads of government of Bosnia and Herzegovina
- Bulgaria
  - Thracian kings
  - Kings of Odrysia
  - Moesia: Roman governors of Lower Moesia
  - Bulgarian monarchs
  - Prime ministers of Bulgaria
  - Presidents of Bulgaria
- Croatia
  - List of rulers of Croatia
  - Presidents of Croatia
  - Prime ministers of Croatia
    - List of governors and heads of state of Fiume
    - Heads of state of Krajina
    - Heads of government of Krajina
- Greece: Rulers of Greece
- Italy: Rulers of Italy
- Kosovo
  - Presidents of Kosovo
  - Prime Minister of Kosovo
- North Macedonia
  - Presidents of North Macedonia
  - Prime ministers of North Macedonia
- Malta
  - Presidents of Malta, 1974–present
  - Prime ministers of Malta, 1921–1933, 1947–1958, 1962–present
  - Monarchs of Malta, 1091–1798, 1800–1974
  - Grand masters of Malta, 1530–1798
  - Civil commissioners of Malta, 1799–1813
  - Governors of Malta, 1813–1964
  - Governors-general of Malta, 1964–1974
- Montenegro
  - Rulers of Montenegro
  - List of presidents of Montenegro
  - Prime Minister of Montenegro
- Portugal
  - Portuguese monarchs
  - Dukes of Braganza
  - Princes of Beira
  - Prime ministers of Portugal
  - Presidents of Portugal
  - List of Portuguese monarchs
- San Marino
  - Captains regent of San Marino, 1900–present
  - Captains regent of San Marino, 1700–1900
  - Captains regent of San Marino, 1500–1700
  - Captains regent of San Marino, 1243–1500
- Serbia
  - Presidents of Serbia
  - Prime ministers of Serbia
  - President of the Government of Vojvodina
  - List of heads of state of Yugoslavia
  - Prime Minister of Yugoslavia
  - President of Serbia and Montenegro
  - Prime Minister of Serbia and Montenegro
  - Monarchs of Serbia
  - Princes of Zeta
- Slovenia
  - Presidents of Slovenia
  - Prime Minister of Slovenia
- Spain
  - Rulers of Spain
  - Presidents of Spain
  - Prime ministers of Spain
- Vatican City/Holy See
  - Popes
  - President of the Governorate
  - Cardinal Secretary of State

==== Western Europe ====
- Belgium
  - Belgian monarchs
  - Prime ministers of Belgium
  - Governors of the Habsburg Netherlands
  - Minister-President of the Brussels-Capital Region
  - Minister-President of Flanders
  - Minister-President of Wallonia
  - Minister-President of the French Community
  - Minister-President of the German-speaking Community
- France: Rulers of France
- Luxembourg
  - Prime ministers of Luxembourg
  - Monarchs of Luxembourg
- Monaco
  - Princes of Monaco
    - Succession to the Monegasque Throne
  - Ministers of state
  - Prime ministers of Monaco
- Netherlands
  - Dutch monarchy
  - Prime ministers of the Netherlands
  - List of rulers of the Netherlands
  - Governors of the Habsburg Netherlands
  - Low Countries (Netherlands, Belgium):
  - Rulers of East Frisia
  - Rulers of Frisia
  - Prince of Orange
  - Duke of Brabant
  - Lords and margraves of Bergen op Zoom
  - Dukes and counts of Guelders
  - Duke of Lower Lorraine
  - Count of Bouillon
  - Count of Flanders
  - Count of Hainaut
  - Count of Holland
  - Counts of Leuven
  - Bishop of Utrecht
  - Marquis of Namur

=== Oceania ===
==== Australasia ====
- Australia
  - Monarchs of Australia
  - Governors-general of Australia
  - Cabinet of Australia
    - Prime ministers of Australia
    - Deputy prime ministers of Australia
    - Attorneys general for Australia
    - Ministers for defence
    - Ministers for foreign affairs
    - Treasurers of Australia
- Premiers of New South Wales
- Premiers of Queensland
- Premiers of South Australia
- Premiers of Tasmania
- List of premiers of Victoria
- Premier of Western Australia
- Heads of government of Norfolk Island
- Chief Minister of the Northern Territory
- Chief Minister of the Australian Capital Territory
- Governors of New South Wales
- Governors of Queensland
- Governors of South Australia
- Governors of Tasmania
- Governors of Victoria
- Governor of Western Australia
- Administrative heads of Norfolk Island
- Administrator of the Northern Territory
- Administrative heads of Australian Antarctic Territory
- Administrative heads of Macquarie Island
- Cocos Islands
  - King of the Cocos Islands
- New Zealand
  - Governors-general of New Zealand
  - New Zealand Cabinet
    - Prime ministers of New Zealand
    - Deputy prime ministers of New Zealand
    - Ministers of finance
    - Ministers of foreign affairs
  - Speakers of the House of Representatives
  - Māori kings and queens
- Mayors of Auckland
- Mayors of Christchurch
- Mayors of Dunedin
- Mayors of Wellington

==== Melanesia ====
- Fiji
  - Chairmen of Fiji's Great Council of Chiefs
  - Chief Justice of Fiji
  - Colonial governors of Fiji
  - Fijian heads of state
  - Foreign ministers of Fiji
  - Governors-general of Fiji
  - House of Representatives of Fiji (abolished in 2013)
  - Ministers for Fijian affairs
  - Presidents of Fiji
  - Prime ministers of Fiji
  - Senate of Fiji (abolished in 2013)
  - Speakers of the Fijian House of Representatives
  - Vice-presidents of Fiji
- Papua New Guinea
  - Governor-General of Papua New Guinea
  - Prime Minister of Papua New Guinea
- Solomon Islands
  - Governor-General of Solomon Islands
  - Prime Minister of the Solomon Islands
- Vanuatu
  - President of Vanuatu
  - Prime Minister of Vanuatu

==== Micronesia ====
- Kiribati
  - President of Kiribati
- Marshall Islands
  - Presidents of the Marshall Islands
- Federated States of Micronesia
  - President of the Federated States of Micronesia
- Nauru
  - President of Nauru
- Palau
  - President of Palau

==== Polynesia ====
- Cook Islands
  - Prime ministers of the Cook Islands
- Niue
  - Premiers of Niue
- Samoa
  - Samoan heads of state
    - Malietoa
  - Prime ministers of Samoa
- Tonga
  - Kings of Tonga
  - Prime ministers of Tonga
- Tuvalu
  - Governors-general of Tuvalu
  - Prime ministers of Tuvalu

== Religious leaders ==
=== Christianity ===
- List of current Christian leaders

- List of patriarchs, archbishops and bishops

==== Roman Catholic Church ====
- List of popes
  - Grand masters of the Knights Hospitaller
    - Priors of Saint John of Jerusalem in England

==== Eastern Orthodox Church ====
- List of Ecumenical Patriarchs of Constantinople

==== Anglican Communion ====
- List of archbishops of Canterbury
- Anglican primates

==== Other denominations ====
- General of The Salvation Army
- Moderator of the United Church of Canada
- President of The Church of Jesus Christ of Latter-day Saints

=== Judaism ===
- Chief rabbis of the United Kingdom
- Chief rabbis of Israel

=== Islam ===
- Caliphate
- Shi'a Imam
- Grand Mufti

=== Hinduism ===
- Rashtriya Swayamsevak Sangh
- Arya Samaja

=== Buddhism ===
- Dalai Lama
- Panchen Lama
- Karmapa
- Shamarpa
- Sakya Trizin
- Supreme Patriarch of Thailand
- Supreme Patriarch of Cambodia

== Other lists ==
- List of oldest living state leaders
- List of current governments
- List of current vice presidents and designated acting presidents
- List of current legislatures
- List of current presidents of legislatures

=== Ministers by portfolio ===
- Defence minister
- Finance minister
- Foreign minister
- Interior minister
- Justice minister
