= Lists by country =

This is a series of lists by country. The lists generally cover topics related to sovereign countries; however, states with limited recognition are also included.

== Topical country articles ==
=== Main articles ===
- National capitals
- National mottos
- National constitutions
- National anthems
- Armorials (Coats of arms / National emblems)
- Flags
- Administrative divisions
- Politics
  - Political parties
  - Election results
- National governments
  - Current heads of state and government
  - Legislatures
  - Cabinets
  - Office-holders
  - System of government
- Militaries
  - Armies
  - Navies
  - Air forces
- Intelligence agencies

== Topics sorted by country ==
- Airlines
- Area
- Battles
- Cathedrals
- Cemeteries
- Cities
- Education
- Emergency contraception
- Islands
- Maps
- Metro systems
- Monorail systems
- Music genres
- National animals
- National parks
- Newspapers
- Nobel laureates
- Novelists
- Official languages
- People
- Population
- Pornography
- Prostitution
- Rail transport
- Railway companies
- Religions
- Schools
- Suburban and commuter rail systems
- Television
- Tram and light rail transit systems
- Universities and colleges
- Vegetarianism
- World Heritage Sites

== Lists for most countries ==
- Adjectival and demonymic forms of place names
- Armed forces
- Country calling codes
- Country-name etymologies
- Divorce rate
- FIPS country codes
- Former national capitals
- GDP
- GDP per capita
- Historical exchange rates to the USD
- Human Development Index (HDI)
- International rankings
- Internet TLDs
- List of IOC country codes
- List of ISO 3166 country codes
- Lists of most common surnames
- Referendums by country
- Social Progress Index
- Sovereign states by year
- Tallest structures
- UN member states
- Voting systems

== Other ==
- EU member states
- Former countries in Europe after 1815
- Ship prefixes
- Timeline of country and capital changes
