= Political lists =

This page is a list of political lists.

- List of annulled elections
- List of anti-nuclear protests in the United States
- List of basic political science topics
- List of basic public affairs topics
- List of civic and political organizations
- List of close elections
- List of confederations
- List of contributors to Project 2025
- List of current heads of state and government
- List of current governments
- List of democracy and elections-related topics
- List of democratic socialist parties and organizations
- List of enclaves and exclaves
- List of government and military acronyms
- List of major social nudity organizations
- List of murdered political human rights activists
- List of national governments
- List of political ideologies
- List of political metaphors
- Lists of political parties
- List of political party symbols
- List of political scientists
- List of politics by country articles
- List of revolutions and rebellions
- List of rump states
- List of social democratic parties
- List of socialist countries
- List of socialist songs
- List of sovereign states
- List of suffragists and suffragettes
- List of timelines
- List of years in politics
- Lists of countries
- List of political parties by United Nations geoscheme
- List of largest political parties
