= List of rulers of the Berba state of Gwande =

== List of Rulers of the Berba state of Gwande in Benin ==
Tenure	Incumbent	Notes
????	Foundation of Gwande state	
???? to ????	Kasa’	
???? to ????	Wimbo Kasa I	
???? to ????	Kandikoni	
???? to ????	Nyami I	
???? to ????	Dari	
???? to ????	Kunyati	
???? to ????	Sakwa	
???? to ????	Ikori	
???? to ????	Wimbo KasaII	
???? to ????	Nambo	
???? to ????	Nyami II	
???? to ????	Yani	

== Sources ==
- http://www.rulers.org/benitrad.html

== See also ==
- Benin
- Berba states
- Lists of office-holders
