= Lists of government ministries by country =

This is a list of government ministries by country. A ministry is a division of a government that manages a specific sector of public administration.

== Lists ==
Lists of government ministries by country
| Country | Ministries |
|---|---|
| Antigua and Barbuda | Government ministries of Antigua and Barbuda |
| Argentina | Ministries of the Argentine Republic |
| Australia | List of Australian Government entities: List of New South Wales government agencies; List of Queensland Government departments; List of South Australian government agencies; List of Tasmanian government agencies; List of Victorian government agencies; List of Western Australian government agencies |
| Austria | List of government ministries of the Republic of Austria |
| Barbados | List of government ministries of Barbados |
| Belize | List of central government entities in Belize |
| Brunei | List of government ministries of Brunei |
| Cameroon | List of ministries of Cameroon |
| Canada | Structure of the Canadian federal government: List of Manitoba government departments and agencies |
| Chile | List of ministries of Chile |
| Djibouti | Ministries of Djibouti |
| Dominican Republic | Ministries of the Dominican Republic |
| Equatorial Guinea | Government ministries of Equatorial Guinea |
| France | Government ministries of France |
| Germany | Federal ministry (Germany) |
| Greece | List of ministries of Greece |
| Guinea | Government ministries of Guinea |
| Iceland | List of Icelandic ministries |
| India | List of ministries of India: List of departments and agencies of the Government of Kerala; List of departments of the government of Tamil Nadu; List of departments of the government of Tripura; List of departments of the government of Uttarakhand; List of departments of the government of Punjab, India |
| Indonesia | List of government ministries of Indonesia |
| Liberia | List of government ministries of Liberia |
| Maldives | List of ministries of the Maldives |
| Nepal | List of ministries of Nepal |
| Netherlands | Ministries of the Netherlands |
| Nigeria | Federal Ministries of Nigeria: Ministries of Kaduna State; List of government ministries of Lagos State; List of government ministries of Rivers State; List of ministries, agencies and commissions in Akwa Ibom State |
| Norway | List of Norwegian ministries |
| Peru | List of ministries of Peru |
| Philippines | Executive departments of the Philippines |
| Poland | Ministries of Poland |
| Samoa | Government ministries of Samoa |
| Saudi Arabia | Ministries of Saudi Arabia |
| Scotland | Directorates of the Scottish Government: Public bodies of the Scottish Government; Executive agencies of the Scottish Government |
| South Africa | Departments of the Government of South Africa |
| Soviet Union | List of ministries of the Soviet Union |
| Spain | Spanish government departments |
| Sri Lanka | List of ministries of Sri Lanka |
| Sweden | List of government ministries of Sweden |
| Syria | Government ministries of Syria |
| Thailand | List of government ministries of Thailand |
| Turkey | Ministries of Turkey |
| Uganda | List of government ministries of Uganda |
| United Kingdom | Departments of the Government of the United Kingdom: List of government departments and agencies in Northern Ireland |
| United States | United States federal executive departments |
| Uruguay | List of ministries of Uruguay |

== See also ==
- List of national governments
