= Maps of present-day countries and dependencies =

This is a list of articles holding galleries of maps of present-day countries and dependencies. The list includes all countries listed in the List of countries, the French overseas departments, the Spanish and Portuguese overseas regions and inhabited overseas dependencies.

- See List of extinct countries, empires, etc. and Former countries in Europe after 1815 for articles about countries that are no longer in existence.
- See List of countries for other articles and lists on countries.

Wikimedia Commons includes the Wikimedia Atlas of the World.

Entries available in the atlas

General pages
commons:Atlas – commons:Historical atlas - Index of the Atlas - Names in native languages

The world and its continents and oceans
General maps of the world - Historical maps of the world - Old maps - Africa - North and South America - Antarctica - Asia - Europe (History, European Union) - Oceania - Oceans

Historical era and themes
Prehistory - Antiquity - Middle Ages - Age of Renaissance - Early Modern Age - 20th Century - Early Asian Societies - Rise of Islam - Early American Societies - Colonialism - World War I - World War II

Countries with undisputed status
Afghanistan - Albania - Algeria - Andorra - Angola - Antigua and Barbuda - Argentina - Armenia - Australia - Austria - Azerbaijan - Bahamas - Bahrain - Bangladesh - Barbados - Belarus - Belgium - Belize - Benin - Bhutan - Bolivia - Bosnia and Herzegovina - Botswana - Brazil - Brunei - Bulgaria - Burkina Faso - Burundi - Cambodia - Cameroon - Canada - Cape Verde - Central African Republic - Chad - Chile - China - Colombia - Comoros - Democratic Republic of the Congo - Republic of the Congo - Costa Rica - Côte d'Ivoire - Croatia - Cuba - Cyprus - Czech Republic - Denmark - Djibouti - Dominica - Dominican Republic - East Timor - Ecuador - Egypt - El Salvador - Equatorial Guinea - Eritrea - Estonia - Eswatini - Ethiopia - Fiji - Finland - France - Gabon - The Gambia - Georgia - Germany - Ghana - Greece - Grenada - Guatemala - Guinea - Guinea-Bissau - Guyana - Haiti - Honduras - Hungary - Iceland - India - Indonesia - Iran - Iraq - Ireland - Israel - Italy - Jamaica - Japan - Jordan - Kazakhstan - Kenya - Kiribati - North Korea - South Korea - Kuwait - Kyrgyzstan - Laos - Latvia - Lebanon - Lesotho - Liberia - Libya - Liechtenstein - Lithuania - Luxembourg - North Macedonia - Madagascar - Malawi - Malaysia - Maldives - Mali - Malta - Marshall Islands - Mauritania - Mauritius - Mexico - Federated States of Micronesia - Moldova - Monaco - Mongolia - Montenegro - Morocco - Mozambique - Myanmar - Namibia - Nauru - Nepal - The Netherlands - New Zealand - Nicaragua - Niger - Nigeria - Norway - Oman - Pakistan - Palau - Panama - Papua New Guinea - Paraguay - Peru - Philippines - Poland - Portugal - Qatar - Romania - Russia - Rwanda - Saint Kitts and Nevis - Saint Lucia - Saint Vincent and the Grenadines - Samoa - San Marino - São Tomé and Príncipe - Saudi Arabia - Senegal - Serbia - Seychelles - Sierra Leone - Singapore - Slovakia - Slovenia - Solomon Islands - Somalia - South Africa - Spain - Sri Lanka - Sudan - Suriname - Sweden - Switzerland - Syria - Tajikistan - Tanzania - Thailand - Togo - Tonga - Trinidad and Tobago - Tunisia - Turkey - Turkmenistan - Tuvalu - Uganda - Ukraine - United Arab Emirates - United Kingdom - United States - Uruguay - Uzbekistan - Vanuatu - Vatican City - Venezuela - Vietnam - Yemen - Zambia - Zimbabwe

Countries with disputed status
Abkhazia - Artsakh - Republic of China / Taiwan - Kosovo - Northern Cyprus - Palestine - Somaliland - South Ossetia - Tamil Eelam - Transnistria - Western Sahara

Dependencies and other overseas territories
Akrotiri and Dhekelia - Åland- American Samoa- Anguilla - Aruba - Ascension Island - Ashmore and Cartier Islands - Baker Island- Bermuda - Bouvet Island - British Indian Ocean Territory - British Virgin Islands - Cayman Islands - Christmas Island - Clipperton Island - Cocos (Keeling) Islands - Cook Islands - Coral Sea Islands - Falkland Islands - Faroe Islands - French Guiana - French Polynesia - French Southern and Antarctic Lands - Gibraltar - Greenland - Guadeloupe - Guam - Guantanamo Bay - Guernsey - Heard Island and McDonald Islands - Hong Kong - Howland Island - Isle of Man - Jan Mayen - Jarvis Island - Jersey - Johnston Atoll - Kingman Reef - Macau - Martinique - Mayotte - Midway Atoll - Montserrat - Navassa Island - Netherlands Antilles - New Caledonia - Niue - Norfolk Island - Northern Mariana Islands - Palmyra Atoll - Pitcairn Islands - Puerto Rico - Réunion - Saint Helena - Saint-Barthélemy - Saint Martin (French) - Saint-Pierre and Miquelon - South Georgia and South Sandwich Islands - Svalbard - Tokelau - Tristan da Cunha - Turks and Caicos Islands - United States Virgin Islands - Wake Island - Wallis and Futuna

Disputed areas
Kashmir - Paracel Islands - Spratly Islands

Subnational autonomous entities
Aceh - Adjara - Adygea - Altai - Andalusia - Aosta Valley - Athos - Azores - Balearic Islands - Bashkortostan - Basque Country - Bougainville - Brussels - Buryatia - Canary Islands - Catalonia - Chechnya - Chuvashia - Corsica - Crimea - Curaçao - Dagestan - Easter Island - England - Bosnia and Herzegovina (Federation) - Flanders - Friuli-Venezia Giulia - Gagauzia - Galicia - Galápagos Islands - Gorno-Badakhshan - Guangxi - Ingushetia - Inner Mongolia - Kabardino-Balkaria - Kalmykia - Karachay-Cherkessia - Karakalpakstan - Karelia - Khakassia - Komi - Kurdistan (Iraqi) - Madeira - Mari El - Mordovia - Mindanao - Nakhchivan - Navarre - Nevis - Ningxia -North Ossetuia-Alania - Northern Ireland - Quebec - Saint Martin (Dutch) - Sakha - Sardinia - Scotland - Sicily - Srpska - Tatarstan - Tibet - Trentino-Alto Adige - Tuva - Udmurtia - Vojvodina - Wales - Wallonia - Xinjiang - Zanzibar

Former countries
Austria-Hungary - Byzantine Empire - Caliphate - Czechoslovakia - Frankish Empire - Inca Empire - Macedonian Empire - Roman Empire - Soviet Union - Yugoslavia

Themes
International organizations - Languages - Religions

Old atlas
Stielers Handatlas 1891

== See also ==
- Portal:Atlas
- Lists by country
