= List of rulers of Kabul =

List of Afghan Rulers in present-day Afghanistan with capital at Kabul:

Term	Incumbent	Notes
Shahs (kings)
Saddozay dynasty of Popalzay
July 1747 to 16 October 1772	Ahmad Shah Durrani
16 October 1772 to 18 May 1793	Timur Shah
23 May 1793 to 1801	Zaman Shah
25 July 1801 to July 1803	Mahmud Shah Durrani	1st Term
13 July 1803 to 1809	Shuja Shah Durrani	1st Term
3 May 1808 to 1808	Qaysar Shah	In rebellion
3 May 1809 to 1818	Mahmud Shah Durrani	2nd Term
1818 to 1819	Ali Shah Durrani
1819 to 1823	Ayub Shah
Mohammadzay dynasty of Barakzay
1823 to 1823	Habibollah Shah
1823 to 1826	Soltan Mohammad Khan Mohammadzay (regent)
1826 to 1836	Dost Mohammad Khan (regent)
Emir
Mohammadzay dynasty of Barakzay
1836 to 2 August 1839	Dost Mohammad Khan, Amir al-Mo’menin	1st Term
Shah (king)
Saddozay dynasty of Popalzay
8 May 1839 to 5 April 1842	Shuja Shah Durrani	2nd Term
1841 to April 1842	Mohammad Zaman Khan Mohammadzay (regent)	In rebellion
Emirs
Saddozay dynasty of Popalzay
29 June 1842 to 12 October 1842	Fath Jang Khan
12 October 1842 to December 1842	Shahpur Khan
Mohammadzay dynasty of Barakzay
December 1842 to 9 June 1863	Dost Mohammad Khan, Amir al-Mo’menin	2nd Term
1863 to May 1866	Sher Ali Khan, Amir al-Mo’menin	1st Term
May 1866 to 7 October 1867	Mohammad Afzal Khan, Amir al-Mo’menin
7 October 1867 to 8 September 1868	Mohammad Azam Khan, Amir al-Mo’menin
8 September 1868 to 21 February 1879	Sher Ali Khan, Amir al-Mo’menin	2nd Term
21 February 1879 to 12 October 1879	Mohammad Yaqub Khan, Amir al-Mo’menin
1879 to 31 March 1880	Mohammad Jan, Amir al-Mo’menin (minister-regent)
22 July 1880 to 3 October 1901	Abdor Rahman Khan, Amir al-Mo’menin

== See also ==
- Kabul Shahi (disambiguation)
- Jayapala
