= Lists of political office-holders in France =

These are lists of political office-holders in France.

== Heads of state ==
- Presidents of France
- French monarchs
- Frankish Kings

== Heads of government ==
- Prime Ministers of France
- List of the mayors of the Palaces

== Parliament officeholders ==
- Presidents of the National Assembly
- Presidents of the Senate

== Heads of subdivisions ==
- Colonial and Departmental Heads of Guadeloupe

== Heads of former states ==
- List of rulers of Tahiti
- King of Burgundy

== State office-holders ==
- Great Officers of the Crown of France
- Marshal of France
- Constable of France

== Nobility ==
- Prince of Condé
- Prince of Conti
- Dukes of Aiguillon
- Counts and dukes of Alençon
- Counts and dukes of Angoulême
- Counts and Dukes of Anjou
- Duke of Aquitaine
- Counts and Dukes of Auvergne
- Duc de Berry
- Duke of Bourbon
- Duke of Brittany
- Duke of Burgundy
- Counts and Dukes of Étampes
- Dukes of Gascony
- Duc de Guise
- Duke of Lorraine
- Counts and Dukes of Maine
- Counts and Dukes of Montpensier
- Duc de Nemours
- Duke of Normandy
- Duke of Orléans
- Counts and dukes of Penthièvre
- Counts and dukes of Rethel
- Counts and Dukes of Vendôme
- Counts of Arles
- Count of Armagnac
- Count of Artois
- Lords, Counts, and Dukes of Aumale
- County of Auxerre
- Count of Blois
- Count of Boulogne
- Counts of Brienne
- Count of Burgundy
- Count of Champagne
- Count of Clermont-en-Beauvaisis
- Count of Comminges
- Count of Dreux
- Count of Eu
- Count of Flanders
- Count of Foix
- Count of Ligny
- Count of La Marche
- Count of Meaux
- Count of Meulan
- Count of Mortain
- Count of Nevers
- Count of Paris
- Count of Perche
- Count of Ponthieu
- Count of Poitiers
- Counts of Provence
- Counts of Rouergue
- Count of St. Pol
- Counts of Toulouse
- Counts of Tours
- Count of Valentinois
- Count of Verdun
- Count of Vermandois
- Counts of the Véxin
- Viscounts of Béarn
- Viscount of Narbonne
- Lords of Albret
- Lords of Baux
- Lords of Coucy
- Lords of Le Puiset
- Lords of Lusignan
- Lords of Montpellier
- Lords of Montlhéry
- Lords of Montmorency

== See also ==
- Lists of office-holders
