= List of captains regent of San Marino, 1243–1500 =

Coat of arms of the Republic of San Marino.

This is a list of captains regent (Capitani Reggenti) of San Marino from 1243 to 1500 (information is very incomplete for the early period).

Year	Semester	Captain Regent	Captain Regent
1243	October	Oddone Scarito	Filippo da Sterpeto
1253	April	Oddone Scarito	Andrea Superchj
1254	April	Taddeo di Giovani Ardelj	
1286	April	Ugolino Baracone	
1302	April	Giovanni di Causetta Giannini	
1303	April	Arimino Baracone	Simone da Sterpeto
1321	April	Venturuccio di Giannuccio	
1323	April	Giovanni di Causetta Giannini	Ugolino Fornaro
1325		Ser Bonanni Notaio	Mule Acatolli di Piandavello
1331	April	Ugucciolo da Valdragone	
1336		Venturuzzo di Franceschino	Muzolo da Bauti
1337	October	Bentivegna da Valle	Foschino di Novello
1338	October	Denaro Madroni	Fosco Raffanelli
1339	April	Ricevuto	Gioagnolo di Acaptolo
1341	April	Bentivegna	Zanutino
1342	October	Ricevuto di Ughetto	Foschino di Filipuccio
1343		Franzolino di Chillo	Cecco di Chillo
1347		Foschino Calcigni	
1351	April	Francesco Pistorj	Ciapetta di Novello
1353	April	Giovanni di Guiduccio	Nino di Simonino
1356	April	Gioagnolo di Acaptolo	Paolo di Ceccolo
1357		Giovanni di Guiduccio	Foschino Calcigni
1357		Giovanni di Bianco	
1359	October	Giovanni di Guiduccio	Corbello di Vita
1360		Ciapetta di Novello	Nino di Simonino
1360		Foschino Calcigni	Giovanni di Bianco
1362	October	Guidino di Giovanni	Giovanni di Guiduccio
1363	April	Giovanni di Bianco	Nino di Simonino
1364		Guidino di Giovanni	Cecco di Chillo
1364		Foschino Calcigni	Corbello Giannini
1365	October	Gioagnolo di Acaptolo	Ugolino di Giovanni Vanioli
1366	April	Nicolino di Ariminuccio	Vanne di Nomaiolo
1366	October	Bartolino di Giovanni di Bianco	Nino di Simonino
1367	April	Guidino di Giovanni	Paolo di Ceccolo
1367	October	Gioagnolo di Ugolinuccio	Ghino Fabbro
1368	April	Muciolino di Ciolo	Giovanni di Riguccio
1368	October	Orbello di Vita Giannini	Ugolino di Giovanni Vanioli
1369	April	Mignone Bauto	Lunardino di Bernardo Fabbro
1369	October	Gioagnolo di Ugolinuccio	Giovanni di Riguccio
1370	April	Ciappetta di Novello	Ugolino di Giovanni
1370	October	Guidino di Giovanni	Paolo di Ceccolo
1371	April	Nino di Simonino	Maxio di Tonso Alberghetti
1371	October	Mucciolino di Ciolo	Bartolino di Giovanni di Bianco
1372	April	Corbello di Vita Giannini	Mignone Bauto
1372	October	Giovanni di Riguccio	Martino di Guerolo Pistorj
1373	April	Ugolino di Giovanni	Lunardino di Bernardo
1373	October	Paolo di Ceccolo	Antonio di Mula
1374	April	Andrea di Nanne	Guidino di Giovanni
1374	October	Giovanni di Riguccio	Gozio di Mucciolino
1375	April	Ugolino di Giovanni	Paolino di Giovanni di Bianco
1378	April	Lunardino di Bernardo	Simone di Belluzzo
1378	October	Gozio di Mucciolino	Ondedeo di Tonso
1380	October	Paolo di Ceccolo	Bartolino di Antonio
1381	April	Lunardino di Bernardo	Samperino di Giovanni
1381	October	Maxio di Tonso	Niccolò di Giove
1382	April	Ugolino di Giovanni	Giovanni di Andrea
1382	October	Giangio di Ceccolo	Bernardo di Guerolo
1383	April	Paolino di Giovanni di Bianco	Guidino di Foschino
1383	October	Lunardino di Bernardo	Giannino di Cavalluccio
1384	April	Samperino di Giovanni	Martino di Guerolo de' Pistorj
1384	October	Paolo di Ceccolo	Benetino di Fosco
1386	April	Giovanni di Francesco	Gozio di Mucciolino
1390	October	Gozio di Mucciolino	Bartolino di Antonio
1391	April	Giovanni di Francesco	Menguccio di Simonino
1391	October	Maxio di Tonso	Lunardino di Bernardo
1392	April	Paolo di Ceccolo	Simone di Belluzzo
1392	October	Samperino di Giovanni	Giannino di Cavalluccio
1393	April	Gozio di Mucciolino	Antonio Tegna
1393	October	Bartolino di Antonio	Nicolò di Giove
1394	April	Lunardino di Bernardo	Martino di Guerolo de' Pistorj
1394	October	Ugolino di Giovanni	Cecco di Alessandro
1395	April	Vita di Corbello	Giovanni di Andrea
1395	October	Simone di Belluzzo	Rigone di Giovanni
1396	April	Samperino di Giovanni	Giovanni di Francesco
1396	October	Paolino di Giovanni di Bianco	Giovanni di Pasino
1397	April	Bartolino di Antonio	Giacomino di Paolo
1397	October	Nicolò di Giove	Marino di Ghino Fabbro
1398	April	Marino di Fosco	Giovanni di Andrea
1398	October	Gozio di Mucciolino	Rigone di Giovanni
1399	April	Giovanni di Guidino	Simone di Belluzzo
1399	October	Martino di Guerolo de' Pistorj	Antonio di Tegna
1400	April	Paolino di Giovanni di Bianco	Francesco di Corbello
1400	October	Ugolino di Giovanni	Betto di Guerolo
1401	April	Giovanni di Francesco	Bettino di Paolo
1401	October	Bartolino di Antonio	Michelino di Paoluccio
1402	April	Gozio di Mucciolino	Landolino di Nicolino
1402	October	Simone di Menghino	Rigone di Giovanni
1403	April	Vita di Corbello	Simone di Belluzzo
1403	October	Martino di Guerolo de' Pistorj	Antonio Lunardini
1404	April	Paolino di Giovanni Bianco	Betto di Tura
1404	October	Antonio di Tegna	Antonio di Marino di Fosco
1405	April	Giovanni di Guidino (died during his term, replaced by Michele di Giovanni)	Bettino di Paolo
1405	October	Marino di Ghino	Foschino di Benedetto Madroni
1406	April	Giovanni di Francesco de' Pistorj	Giovanni di Nino de' Gherardi
1406	October	Antonio Lunardini	Giovanni di Pasino
1407	April	Gozio di Mucciolino	Giovanni di Cecco di Alessandro
1407	October	Paolino di Giovanni di Bianco	Michelino di Paoluccio
1408	April	Bartolino di Antonio	Michelino di Berardo
1408	October	Simone di Menghino de' Calcigni	Benedetto di Tosetto
1409	April	Giovanni di Francesco	Giacomino di Paolo
1409	October	Rigone di Giovanni	Antonio di Tegna
1410	April	Vita di Corbello	Bettino di Paolo
1410	October	Michelino di Paoluccio	Sante Lunardini
1411	April	Simone di Belluzzo	Antonio di Marino di Fosco
1411	October	Paolo di Carbone	Giovanni di Pasino Benvegnudi
1412	April	Simone di Menghino de' Calcigni	Foschino di Benedetto Madroni
1412	October	Antonio di Segna	Giovanni di Ugolino di Giovanni
1413	April	Paolino di Giovanni di Bianco	Giovanni di Paolino Vitola
1413	October	Francesco di Bartoccino	Michelino di Paoluccio
1414	April	Antonio Lunardini	Antonio di Marino di Fosco
1414	October	Benedetto di Tosetto	Michelino di Berardo
1415	April	Bettino di Paolo	Silvestro di Cecco
1415	October	Paolino di Giovanni di Bianco	Antonio di Simone Belluzzi
1416	April	Antonio Lunardini	Giovanni di Paolino Vitola
1416	October	Michelino di Paoluccio	Giovanni di Pasino Benvegnudi
1417	April	Simone di Menghino Calcigni	Foschino di Benedetto Madroni
1417	October	Giovanni di Ugolino di Giovanni	Cecco di Marino di Fosco
1418	April	Sante Lunardini	Bettino di Paolo
1418	October	Antonio di Marino di Fosco	Antonio di Tegna
1419	April	Paolino di Giovanni di Bianco	Foschino di Benedetto Madroni
1419	October	Giovanni di Paolino Vitola	Benedetto di Tosetto
1420	April	Antonio di Tegna	Cristofaro di Paolo Carboni
1420	October	Antonio di Marino di Fosco	Antonio Giannini
1421	April	Antonio di Simone Belluzzi	Giovanni di Pasino Benvegnudi
1421	October	Bettino di Paolo	Sante Lunardini
1422	April	Cristofaro di Paolo Carboni	Antonio Giannini
1422	October	Francesco di Bartoccino	Antonio di Benedetto Tosetto
1423	April	Antonio Lunardini	Simone di Menghino Calcigni
1423	October	Antonio di Marino Di Fosco	Giovanni di Paolino Vitola
1424	April	Antonio di Tegna	Antonio di Simone Belluzzi
1424	October	Sante Lunardini	Baldassarre di Giovanni
1425	April	Giovanni di Paolino	Antonio di Rigo
1425	October	Antonio di Marino di Fosco	Lorenzo di Piero
1426	April	Francesco di Bartoccino	Francesco di Simone Belluzzi
1426	October	Sante Lunardini	Francesco di Betto
1427	April	Cristofaro di Paolo	Antonio di Benedetto
1427	October	Giovanni di Pasino	Andrea di Cecco
1428	April	Antonio di Tegna	Antonio di Marino di Fosco
1428	October	Sante Lunardini	Antonio Giannini
1429	April	Antonio di Rigo	Andrea di Cecco
1429	October	Antonio di Simone Belluzzi	Giovanni di Pasino Benvegnudi
1430	April	Francesco di Simone Belluzzi	Giovanni di Antonio
1430	October	Sante Lunardini	Benetino di Paolino
1431	April	Antonio di Simone Belluzzi	Antonio di Rigo
1431	October	Giovanni di Antonio	Antonio di Bartolino
1432	April	Luigi di Vita	Baldassarre di Giovanni
1432	October	Sante Lunardini	Tommaso di Antonio
1433	April	Antonio di Simone Belluzzi	Andrea di Cecco
1433	October	Antonio di Benedetto	Barnaba di Antonio Lunardini
1434	April	Andrea di Michelino	Francesco di Betto
1434	October	Benetino di Paolino	Luigi di Vita
1435		Giovanni di Antonio Lunardini	Ciono di Giovanni
1436	April	Antonio di Simone Belluzzi	Antonio Giannini
1436	October	Francesco di Simone Belluzzi	Michele di Giovanni
1437	April	Andrea di Cecco	Francesco di Bartolo
1437	October	Francesco di Menghino	Giovanni di Antonio
1438	April	Niccolò di Michelino	Barnaba di Antonio Lunardini
1438	October	Tommaso di Antonio	Antonio di Simone Belluzzi
1439	April	Luigi di Vita	Niccolò di Sabattino
1439	October	Sante Lunardini	Bianco di Antonio
1440	April	Barnaba di Antonio Lunardini	Antonio Giannini
1440	October	Antonio di Simone Belluzzi	Giacomo d'Antonio Sammaritani
1441	April	Filippo di Giovanni Caccia	Niccolò di Michelino
1441	October	Marino Calcigni	Tommaso di Antonio
1442	April	Francesco di Simone Belluzzi	Cecco di Giovanni da Valle
1442	October	Michele di Giovanni di Pasino	Bianco di Antonio
1443	April	Barnaba di Antonio Lunardini	Mengo di Antonio
1443	October	Luigi di Vita	Menghino di Francesco Calcigni
1444	April	Francesco di Niccolò	Giacomo d'Antonio Sammaritani
1444	October	Antonio di Simone Belluzzi	Cecco di Giovanni da Valle
1445	April	Niccolò di Michelino	Bartolo di Francesco
1445	October	Cristofaro di Paolo	Antonio Giannini
1446	April	Giacomo d'Antonio Sammaritani	Bartolo di Angelo di Ciono
1446	October	Bianco d'Antonio	Cecco di Giovanni da Valle
1447	April	Menghino di Francesco Calcigni	Marino di Fosco (died during his term, replaced by Vita di Giovanni di Paolino)
1447	October	Francesco di Niccolò	Filippo di Antonio Madroni
1448	April	Barnaba di Antonio Lunardini	Giacomo d'Antonio Sammaritani
1448	October	Baldassarre di Giovanni	Cecco di Giovanni da Valle
1449	April	Bartolo di Angelo di Ciono	Venturuccio di Lorenzo
1449	October	Bianco di Antonio	Simone di Antonio Belluzzi
1450	April	Francesco di Simone Belluzzi	Matteo di Mucciolo (died during his term, replaced by Marino di Venturino)
1450	October	Menghino di Francesco Calcigni	Mengo di Antonio
1451	April	Cecco di Giovanni da Valle	Simone di Antonio Belluzzi
1451	October	Niccolò di Michelino	Paolo di Angelo di Ciono
1452	April	Giacomo d'Antonio Sammaritani	Andrea di Cecco
1452	October	Cecco di Giovanni da Valle	Simone di Marino di Giovanni
1453	April	Simone di Antonio Belluzzi	Bartolo di Michele
1453	October	Menghino di Francesco Calcigni	Filippo di Antonio Madroni
1454	April	Bartolo di Antonio Tegna	Girolamo di Francesco Belluzzi
1454	October	Cecco di Giovanni da Valle	Francesco di Giuliano Righi
1455	April	Simone di Antonio Belluzzi	Andrea di Cecco
1455	October	Giacomo d'Antonio Samaritani	Bartolo di Giovanni di Casalino
1456	April	Girolamo di Francesco Belluzzi	Riccio di Andrea
1456	October	Niccolò di Michelino	Girolamo di Antonio
1457	April	Bianco di Antonio	Bartolo di Michele
1457	October	Simone di Antonio Belluzzi	Marino di Venturino
1458	April	Girolamo di Francesco Belluzzi	Cecco di Giovanni da Valle
1458	October	Menghino di Francesco Calcigni	Andrea di Cecco (died 1459 and replaced by Bartolo di Michele Pasini)
1459	April	Bianco di Antonio	Bartolo di Antonio
1459	October	Giacomo d'Antonio Sammaritani	Polinoro di Antonio Lunardino
1460	April	Marino di Venturino	Riccio di Andrea
1460	October	Cecco di Giovanni da Valle	Simone di Marino di Giovanni
1461	April	Simone di Antonio Belluzzi	Francesco di Giovanni Sabattini
1461	October	Menetto di Menetto Bonelli	Bianco di Antonio
1462	April	Bartolo di Antonio	Marino di Antonio Giannini
1462	October	Giacomo di Antonio Sammaritani	Riccio di Andrea
1463	April	Girolamo di Francesco Belluzzi	Maurizio di Antonio
1463	October	Cecco di Giovanni da Valle	Pasquino di Antonio
1464	April	Marino Venturini	Simone di Cecco di Benetto
1464	October	Simone di Antonio Belluzzi	Giovanni Calcigni
1465	April	Bianco di Antonio	Paolo di Angelo di Ciono
1465	October	Bartolo di Antonio	Simone di Baldo
1466	April	Pasquino di Antonio	Marino di Venturino
1466	October	Girolamo di Francesco Belluzzi	Cecco di Giovanni da Valle
1467	April	Giacomo di Marino	Riccio di Andrea
1467	October	Simone di Antonio Belluzzi	Maurizio di Antonio
1468	April	Marino di Venturino	Marino Giangi
1468	October	Lodovico di Marino Calcigni	Cecco di Giovanni da Valle
1469	April	Bianco di Antonio	Simone di Marino di Giovanni
1469	October	Bartolo di Antonio	Menetto di Menetto Bonelli
1470	April	Girolamo di Francesco Belluzzi	Paolo di Angelo di Ciono
1470	October	Fabrizio di Pier Leone Corbelli	Riccio di Andrea
1471	April	Giacomo di Marino	Cecco di Giovanni da Valle
1471	October	Giacomo d'Antonio Sammaritani	Marino di Venturino
1472	April	Maurizio di Antonio	Sabatino di Bianco
1472	October	Girolamo di Francesco Belluzzi	Simone di Antonio Belluzzi
1473	April	Cecco di Giovanni da Valle	Serafino di Michele
1473	October	Menetto di Menetto Bonelli	Sabatino di Bianco
1474	April	Bartolo di Antonio	Pasquino di Antonio
1474	October	Serafino di Michele	Marino di Antonio Giannini
1475	April	Simone di Antonio Belluzzi	Simone di Cecco di Benetto
1475	October	Antonio di Marino	Simone di Marino di Giovanni
1476	April	Bianco di Antonio	Giovanni di Menghino Calcigni
1476	October	Bartolo di Antonio	Marino di Venturino
1477	April	Simone di Cecco Benetto	Marino di Antonio Giannini
1477	October	Simone di Antonio Belluzzi	Lodovico di Michele Pasini
1478	April	Giovanni di Menghino Calcigni	Simone di Marino di Giovanni
1478	October	Marino di Venturino	Sabatino di Bianco
1479	April	Antonio di Marino	Evangelista di Girolamo Belluzzi
1479	October	Menetto di Menetto Bonelli	Fabrizio di Pier Leone Corbelli
1480	April	Riccio di Andrea	Marino Samaritani
1480	October	Evangelista di Girolamo Belluzzi	Antonio di Polinoro Lunardini
1481	April	Marino di Venturino	Fabrizio di Pier Leone Corbelli
1481	October	Bartolo di Antonio	Maurizio di Antonio Lunardini
1482	April	Simone di Antonio Belluzzi	Marino Sammaritani
1482	October	Evangelista di Girolamo Belluzzi	Antonio di Polinoro Lunardini
1483	April	Antonio di Marino	Marino di Antonio Giannini
1483	October	Giovanni di Menghino Calcigni	Antonio di Girolamo
1484	April	Riccio di Andrea di Antonio	Simone di Marino di Giovanni
1484	October	Giacomo di Marino	Marino Giangi
1485	April	Maurizio di Antonio Lunardini	Bartolo di Pasquino
1485	October	Sabatino di Bianco	Cristoforo di Cecco di Vita
1486	April	Menetto di Menetto Bonelli	Valente di Paolo
1486	October	Antonio di Bianco	Marino Sammaritani
1487	April	Evangelista di Girolamo Belluzzi	Marino di Simone Muccioli
1487	October	Simone di Antonio Belluzzi	Antonio di Polinoro Lunardini
1488	April	Bartolo di Antonio	Fabrizio di Pier Leone Corbelli
1488	October	Simone di Antonio Belluzzi	Francesco di Antonio di Anastasio
1489	April	Giacomo di Marino	Antonio di Girolamo
1489	October	Marino di Antonio Giannini	Gabriele di Bartolo
1490	April	Antonio di Maurizio Lunardini	Sabatino di Bianco
1490	October	Giovanni di Menghino Calcigni	Marino Giangi
1491	April	Antonio di Bianco	Marino di Simone Muccioli
1491	October	Menetto di Menetto Bonelli	Matteo Tura
1492	April	Riccio di Andrea	Fabrizio di Pier Leone Corbelli
1492	October	Cristoforo di Cecco di Vita	Bonifazio di Andrea
1493	April	Evangelista di Girolamo Belluzzi	Valente di Paolo
1493	October	Menetto di Menetto Bonelli	Francesco di Antonio di Anastasio
1494	April	Antonio di Girolamo	Marino di Simone Muccioli
1494	October	Antonio di Maurizio Lunardini	Marino di Niccolò di Giovanetto
1495	April	Evangelista di Girolamo Belluzzi	Antonio di Polinoro Lunardini
1495	October	Marino di Antonio Giannini	Antonio di Simone Belluzzi
1496	April	Fabrizio di Pier Leone Corbelli	Sabatino di Bianco
1496	October	Cristofaro di Cecco di Vita	Bonifazio di Andrea
1497	April	Antonio di Bianco	Andrea di Giorgio Loli
1497	October	Matteo Tura	Antonio di Bartolomeo
1498	April	Giovanni di Menghino Calcigni	Valente di Paolo
1498	October	Antonio di Girolamo	Marino di Antonio Giannini
1499	April	Marino di Niccolò di Giovanetto	Antonio di Maurizio Lunardini
1499	October	Cristoforo di Cecco di Vita	Bonifazio di Andrea
1500	April	Menetto di Menetto Bonelli	Antonio di Maurizio Lunardini
1500	October	Francesco di Girolamo Belluzzi	Simone di Antonio Belluzzi

== See also ==
- Diarchy
- List of captains regent of San Marino, 1500–1700
- List of captains regent of San Marino, 1700–1900
- List of captains regent of San Marino, 1900–present
- Mucciolo (family)
- Politics of San Marino
