= Administrative heads of the Australian Antarctic Territory =

List of Administrative Heads of Australian Antarctic Territory

Directors of the Australian Antarctic Division (part of the Australian Department of Environment and Heritage)

Term	Incumbent	Notes
1947 to 1948	Stuart Campbell, Chief Executive Officer
1948 to 1948	Stuart Campbell, Director
1949 to 1966	Phillip Law, Director
1966 to 1970	Don F. Styles, acting Director	1st Term; born 1916, died 1995
1970 to 1971	Bryan Rofe, Director	born 1918, died 1971
1971 to 1972	Don F. Styles, acting Director	2nd Term
1972 to 1979	Raymond "Ray" I. Garrod, Director	born 1917, died 2009
1979 to 1984	Clarrie McCue, Director
1984 to 1988	James "Jim" E. Bleasel, Director	born 1936, died 2019
1988 to 1998	Rex Moncur, Director
1998 to 2009	Tony J. Press, Director
2009 to 2011	Lyn Maddock, Director	born 1950
2011 to 2015	Tony Fleming, Director	born 1958, died 2022
2015 to 2018	Nick Gales, Director
2019 to 2023	Kim Ellis, Director
2023 to Present	Emma Campbell, Division Head
