= Lists of political office-holders in Ireland =

These are lists of political office-holders in Ireland.

== Heads of states ==
- President of Ireland (1938–present)
- President of Dáil Éireann (During the revolution)
- High Kings of Ireland
- Kings of Ireland
- Lords of Ireland

== Heads of government ==
- Taoisigh of Ireland (prime minister) (1937–present)
- Tánaistí of Ireland (1937–present)
- Presidents of the Executive Council (1922–1937)

== Heads of former states ==
- Kings of Connacht
- Kings of Ulster
- Kings of Leinster
- Kings of Munster
- Kings of Breifne
- Kings of East Breifne

== British governors ==
- Lord Deputies and Lord Lieutenants of Ireland
- Chief Secretary for Ireland
- Lord Chancellors of Ireland
- Governor-General of the Irish Free State (1922–1936)
- Secretary of State for Northern Ireland

== Courts office-holders ==
- Attorneys General (1922–present)
- Attorneys-General for Ireland

== Ministers ==
- Irish Foreign Ministers

== See also ==
- Lists of office-holders
