= List of government ministries of the Republic of Austria =

The Government Ministries of the Republic of Austria belong to the executive branch of the Austrian Government. The Functions and Duties of each Ministry is declared in the "Bundesministeriengesetz" (Law of Federal Ministries) from 1986.

== Ministries ==
The following table contains the currently active Ministries of the Government of Austria as provided by the Austrian Government.

Ressort	Name
Chancellery	Ministry of the Chancellor (BKA)
Ministry of Commerce and Labour	Ministry of Commerce (BMAW)
Ministry of Education, Science and Research	Ministry of Education (BMBWF)
Ministry of European and International Affairs	Ministry of Foreign Affairs (BMEIA)
Ministry of Finance	Ministry of Finance (BMF)
Ministry of the Interior	Ministry of Interior Affairs (BMI)
Ministry of Justice	Ministry of Justice (BMJ)
Ministry of Arts, Culture, Public Service and Sports	Ministry of Arts and Public Service (BMKÖS)
Ministry of Energy, Environment, Mobility, Innovation and Technology	Ministry of Energy and Infrastructure (BMK)
Ministry of National Defense	Ministry of Defense (BMLV)
Ministry of Agriculture, Forestry, Water Resources and Regional Affairs	Ministry of Agriculture (BML)
Ministry of Health, Social Services, Patient Care and Consumer Safety	Ministry of Social Services (BMSGPK)
