= List of monarchs of Peshawar =

Rulers of Peshawar

List of Afghan Rulers in present-day Afghanistan with capital at Peshawar

Term	Incumbent	Notes	Depiction
Shahs (Kings)
Sadozai/Durrani Dynasty of Popalzay
July 1747 to 16 October 1772	Ahmad Shah Durrani	Shah at Kabul
16 October 1772 to 18 May 1793	Timur Shah	Shah at Kabul
23 May 1793 to 25 july 1801	Zaman Shah	Shah at Kabul, got blinded and dethroned as a result
25 July 1801 to October 1801	Mahmud Shah	Shah at Kabul
October 1801	Shah Shujah Durrani	Self proclaimed Shah (Ascended later)
October 1801 to July 13 1803	Mahmud Shah	Shah at Kabul
13 July 1803 to June 1809	Shah Shujah Durrani	Shah at Kabul
June 1809 to 1818	Mahmud Shah	Shah at Kabul, Overthrew Shujah
1818 to 1819	Sultan Ali Shah	Shah of Kabul
1819 to 1823	Ayub Shah	Last Shah of Durrani dyanasty
