= List of rulers of Herat =

List of Afghan Rulers in present-day Afghanistan with capital at Herat

Term	Incumbent	Notes
Shahs (Kings)
Saddozay Dynasty of Popalzay
July 1747 to 16 October 1772	Ahmad Shah Dorr-e Dorran	Shah at Kabul
16 October 1772 to 18 May 1793	Timur Shah	Shah at Kabul
23 May 1793 to 1797	Zaman Shah	Shah at Kabul
1797 to 1797	Mahmud Shah	1st Term
1797 to 1801	Zaman Shah	Shah at Kabul
July 1803 to 1803	Mahmud Shah	Shah at Kabul
13 July 1803 to 1809	Shoja' al-Molk Shah	Shah at Kabul
3 May 1808 to 1808	Qaysar Shah	Shah at Kabul
3 May 1809 to 1818	Mahmud Shah	Shah at Kabul
1818 to 1819	Mahmud Shah	2nd Term
1819 to 1819	Shirdil Khan Mohammadzay	Shah at Kandahar
1819 to 1826	Mahmud Shah	3rd Term
1826 to March 1842	Kamran Shah
March 1842 to 1 June 1851	Yar Mohammad Khan Alikozay (minister-regent)
1 June 1851 to 15 September 1855	Sayyed Mohammad Khan Alikozay (minister-regent)
15 September 1855 to June 1856	Mohammad Yusuf Khan Mohammadzay (regent)
June 1856 to October 1856	Isa Khan Bardorani (minister-regent)
October 1856 to 27 July 1857	Naser ad-Din Qajar, Shahanshah of Iran	Iranian occupation
Emirs
Mohammadzay Dynasty of Barakzay
27 July 1857 to 26 May 1863	Soltan Ahmad Khan, Amir al-Mo'menin
26 May 1863 to 9 June 1863	Dost Mohammad Khan, Amir al-Mo'menin	Emir at Kabul
9 June 1863 to 8 September 1868	Shir 'Ali Khan, Amir al-Mo'menin
8 September 1868 to 21 February 1879	Shir 'Ali Khan, Amir al-Mo'menin	Emir at Kabul
21 February 1879 to 12 October 1879	Mohammad Ya`qub Khan, Amir al-Mo'menin	Emir at Kabul
March 1880 to 2 October 1881	Mohammad Ayyub Khan
