= Clarrie McCue =

Australian meteorologist

Clarence "Clarrie" Gordon McCue (1927 in Sydney, Australia – 1992) was an Australian meteorologist.

Born in Sydney, Australia, McCue won a bursary to Waverly College before attending Sydney University where he earned a Master of Science degree in physics. After this he went to work for the Australian Commonwealth Department of Defence Weapons Research Establishment (WRE) in Adelaide. During his time here he spent 2 years in Great Britain working with Roy Piggott at the Slough Radio and Ionospheric Laboratory, and later worked in both Singapore and Japan.

He taught at the Duntroon Military College for two years before accepting the directorship of the Ionospheric Prediction Service in 1967. He had previously worked there temporarily while an undergraduate student. In 1979 he was chosen as the director of the Australian Antarctic Territory, a position he held until 1984. In this role he was active in the International Radio Consultative Committee, advising the International Telecommunication Union of the United Nations.

In 1985 he retired to carry out work on behalf of the Catholic Church.
