= Mucciolo =

Mucciolo is a family name that traces from Spain in the 11th century to Italy through the modern day. Branches of the family have since settled in the United States.

== Migration through the years ==
The immigration history of the Mucciolo and Muccioli family is extensive. The beginning of this history has been documented by Vittorio Spreti, the author of the historical encyclopedia for Italian nobility which traces the Mucciolo lineage to Spain, where the family was formed following the merger of the Spanish towns of Mulcios and Orosos Albos not far from Toledo.

The Mucciolo family faced particular hardships following the Moorish invasion of the Iberian Peninsula in 711 because of their noble status as Dukes with the prior Christian monarchy. As a result of these hardships, somewhere around 1000, the Mucciolo family left Spain as political and religious refugees and immigrated to Marchigiana where the first Italian generations were born.

Somewhere between 1600 and 1750 a branch of the Mucciolo settled in Castel San Lorenzo, located in Salerno just outside Naples, where over 70 families of the Mucciolo line are known to live today. Notable branches of the family also migrated to the United States (Mocciolo) as well as San Marino and Bologna. Of these branches the most successful have been those who migrated to San Marino where the family has been able to continue to enjoy the "prestige of nobility and wealth." Many of these San Marino Mucciolos (over the generations the name has changed to Muccioli in San Marino) have served as the Capitani Reggenti (Ruling Captain). The Capitani Reggenti is the head of the executive branch of government, San Marino's equivalent of a president or prime minister. The most recent of the Mucciolo family Capitani Reggenti is Claudio Muccioli whose term ended in April 2006.

== Social standing in Spain ==
On April 12, 1920, King Alfonso XIII of Spain re-recognized the Mucciolos in Spain, as well as those in San Marino, Bologna and Castel San Lorenzo as Spanish nobility, confirming that all the "family Mucciolo" was nobility and restoring the title of Duke. Today, all of the branches of the Mucciolo family are still considered nobility.

== Notable people ==
- Antônio Maria Mucciolo (1923–2012), Italian-born prelate
- Louie Spicolli (born Louis Mucciolo; 1971–1998), American professional wrestler
