= List of national governments =

This is a list of the offices of heads of state, heads of government, cabinet, and legislature, of sovereign states. "Date of origin" refers to the most recent fundamental change in form of government, for example independence, change from absolute monarchy to constitutional monarchy, revolution, new constitution.

== Member and observer states of the United Nations ==
Country	Head of state	Head of government	Cabinet	Legislature	Date of origin
Afghanistan	Supreme Leader	Prime Minister	Cabinet	Leadership Council	2021
Albania	President	Prime Minister	Council of Ministers	Parliament	1991
Algeria	President	Prime Minister	Cabinet	Parliament	1989
Andorra	Co-Princes (Note: The bishop of Urgell in Spain and the president of France serve as Andorra's princes, while each prince appoints a personal representative.)	Head of Government	Executive Council	General Council	1993
Angola	President		Cabinet	National Assembly	2010
Antigua and Barbuda	Monarch	Prime Minister	Cabinet	Parliament	1981
Argentina	President		Ministries	National Congress	1994
Armenia	President	Prime Minister	Cabinet	National Assembly	1995
Australia	Monarch	Prime Minister	Cabinet	Parliament	1901
Austria	President	Chancellor	Cabinet	Parliament	1955
Azerbaijan	President	Prime Minister	Cabinet	National Assembly	1990
Bahamas, The	Monarch	Prime Minister	Cabinet	Parliament	1973
Bahrain	King	Prime Minister	Cabinet	National Assembly	2002
Bangladesh	President	Prime Minister	Cabinet	National Parliament	1971
Barbados	President	Prime Minister	Cabinet	Parliament	2021
Belarus	President	Prime Minister	Council of Ministers	National Assembly	1994
Belgium	King	Prime Minister	Council of Ministers	Federal Parliament	1831
Belize	Monarch	Prime Minister	Cabinet	National Assembly	1981
Benin	President		Cabinet	National Assembly	1990
Bhutan	King	Prime Minister	Council of Ministers	Parliament	1952
Bolivia	President		Cabinet	Plurinational Legislative Assembly	2009
Bosnia and Herzegovina	Presidency	Chairman of the Council of Ministers	Council of Ministers	Parliamentary Assembly	1996
Botswana	President		Cabinet	Parliament	1966
Brazil	President		Cabinet	National Congress	1988
Brunei	Sultan	Prime Minister	Cabinet	Legislative Council	1991
Bulgaria	President	Prime Minister	Council of Ministers	National Assembly	1991
Burkina Faso	President	Prime Minister	Cabinet	National Assembly	1992
Burundi	President	Prime Minister	Council of Ministers	Parliament	2005
Cambodia	King	Prime Minister	Cabinet	Parliament	1993
Cameroon	President		Cabinet	National Assembly	1992
Canada	Monarch	Prime Minister	Cabinet	Parliament	1867
Cape Verde	President	Prime Minister	Cabinet	National Assembly	1992
Central African Republic	President	Prime Minister	Cabinet	National Assembly	2003
Chad	President	Prime Minister	Cabinet	National Assembly	1996
Chile	President		Cabinet	National Congress	1980
China	President (Note: The President of China is legally a ceremonial office and head of state, but the General Secretary of the Chinese Communist Party (de facto leader) has always held this office since 1993 except for the months of transition, making the officeholder the most powerful political figure.)	Premier	State Council	National People's Congress	1982
Colombia	President		Council of Ministers	Congress	1991
Comoros	President		Government	Assembly of the Union	2002
Congo, Democratic Republic of	President	Prime Minister	Government	Parliament	2006
Congo, Republic of	President	Prime Minister	Cabinet	Parliament	2002
Costa Rica	President		Government	Legislative Assembly	1949
Côte d'Ivoire	President	Prime Minister	Government	National Assembly	2000
Croatia	President	Prime Minister	Government	Parliament	1990
Cuba	President (Note: As a one-party ruling communist state, First Secretary of the Communist Party of Cuba holds higher authority over the President, serving as the de facto leader of Cuba.)	Prime Minister	Council of Ministers	National Assembly of People's Power	2019
Cyprus	President		Council of Ministers	House of Representatives	1960
Czech Republic	President	Prime Minister	Cabinet	Parliament	1992
Denmark	Monarch	Prime Minister	Cabinet	Parliament of Denmark	1848
Djibouti	President	Prime Minister	Council of Ministers	National Assembly	1992
Dominica	President	Prime Minister	Cabinet	House of Assembly	1978
Dominican Republic	President		Cabinet	Congress	1994
Ecuador	President		Cabinet	National Assembly	2008
Egypt	President	Prime Minister	Government	Parliament	1953
El Salvador	President		Council of Ministers	Legislative Assembly	1983
Equatorial Guinea	President	Prime Minister	Cabinet	Chamber of People's Representatives	1987
Eritrea	President		Cabinet of Ministers	National Assembly	1993
Estonia	President	Prime Minister	Cabinet	Riigikogu	1992, (1938)
Eswatini	King	Prime Minister	Cabinet	Parliament	2005
Ethiopia	President	Prime Minister	Council of Ministers	Federal Parliamentary Assembly	1995
Fiji	President	Prime Minister	Cabinet	Parliament	2014
Finland	President	Prime Minister	Council of State	Parliament	1919
France	President	Prime Minister	Council of Ministers	Parliament	1958
Gabon	President	Prime Minister	Cabinet	National Assembly	1964
Gambia, The	President		Cabinet	National Assembly	1996
Georgia	President	Prime Minister	Cabinet of Georgia	Parliament	1995
Germany	President	Chancellor	Cabinet	Bundestag	1949
Germany	President	Chancellor	Cabinet	Bundesrat	1949
Ghana	President		Council of Ministers	Parliament	1992
Greece	President	Prime Minister	Cabinet	Parliament	1974
Grenada	Monarch	Prime Minister	Cabinet	Parliament	1974
Guatemala	President		Council of Ministers	Congress	1985
Guinea	President	Prime Minister	Cabinet	National Assembly	1991
Guinea-Bissau	President	Prime Minister	Cabinet	National People's Assembly	1984
Guyana	President	Prime Minister	Cabinet	National Assembly	1970
Haiti	President	Prime Minister	Cabinet	National Assembly	1987
Honduras	President		Council of Secretaries of State	National Congress	1982
Hungary	President	Prime Minister	Cabinet	National Assembly	1990
Iceland	President	Prime Minister	Cabinet	Althing	1944
India	President	Prime Minister	Council of Ministers	Parliament	1950
Indonesia	President		Cabinet	People's Consultative Assembly	1945
Iran	Supreme Leader	President	Cabinet	Islamic Consultative Assembly	1979
Iraq	President	Prime Minister	Council of Ministers	Council of Representatives	2005
Ireland	President	Taoiseach	Cabinet	Oireachtas	1937
Israel	President	Prime Minister	Cabinet	Knesset	1948
Italy	President	Prime Minister	Council of Ministers	Parliament	1948
Jamaica	Monarch	Prime Minister	Cabinet	Parliament	1962
Japan	Emperor	Prime Minister	Cabinet	Diet	1890
Jordan	King	Prime Minister	Cabinet	National Assembly	1952
Kazakhstan	President	Prime Minister	Council of Ministers	Parliament	1995
Kenya	President	Prime Minister	Cabinet	National Assembly	1969
Kiribati	President		Cabinet	House of Assembly	1979
Kuwait	Emir	Prime Minister	Cabinet	National Assembly	1962
Kyrgyzstan	President	Prime Minister	Council of Ministers	Supreme Council	2010
Laos	President (Note: As a one-party ruling communist state, General Secretary of the Lao People's Revolutionary Party holds higher authority over the President, serving as the de facto leader of Laos.)	Prime Minister	Cabinet	National Assembly	1991
Latvia	President	Prime Minister	Council of Ministers	Saeima	1993
Lebanon	President	President of the Council of Ministers	Cabinet	Parliament	1926
Lesotho	King	Prime Minister	Cabinet	Parliament	1966
Liberia	President		Cabinet of Ministers	Legislature	1986
Libya	Chairman of the Presidential Council	Prime Minister	Cabinet	House of Representatives	2011
Liechtenstein	Reigning Prince	Head of Government	Government	Landtag	1921
Lithuania	President	Prime Minister	Council of Ministers	Seimas	1992
Luxembourg	Grand Duke	Prime Minister	Council of Ministers	Chamber of Deputies	1842
Madagascar	President	Prime Minister	Cabinet	Parliament	1992
Malawi	President		Cabinet	National Assembly	1994
Malaysia	Yang di-Pertuan Agong	Prime Minister	Cabinet	Parliament	1957
Maldives	President		Cabinet	Majlis	1932
Mali	President	Prime Minister	Cabinet	National Assembly	1992
Malta	President	Prime Minister	Cabinet	House of Representatives	1964
Marshall Islands	President		Cabinet	Legislature	1979
Mauritania	President	Prime Minister	Cabinet	Parliament	1991
Mauritius	President	Prime Minister	Cabinet	National Assembly	1968
Mexico	President		Cabinet	Congress	1917
Micronesia, Federated States of	President		Cabinet	Congress	1979
Moldova	President	Prime Minister	Cabinet	Parliament	1994
Monaco	Sovereign Prince	Minister of State	Council of Government	National Council	1911
Mongolia	President	Prime Minister	Cabinet	State Great Khural	1992
Montenegro	President	Prime Minister	Government	Parliament	2007
Morocco	King	Head of Government	Cabinet	Parliament	1996
Mozambique	President	Prime Minister	Council of Ministers	Assembly	1990
Myanmar	President		Cabinet	Assembly of the Union	2011
Namibia	President	Prime Minister	Cabinet	Parliament	1990
Nauru	President		Cabinet	Parliament	1968
Nepal	President	Prime Minister	Council of Ministers	Federal Parliament	2015
Netherlands	Monarch	Prime Minister	Cabinet	States General	1983
New Zealand	Monarch	Prime Minister	Cabinet	Parliament	1986
Nicaragua	President		Council of Ministers	National Assembly	1987
Niger	President	Prime Minister	Cabinet	National Assembly	2010
Nigeria	President		Cabinet	National Assembly	1999
North Korea	President of State Affairs (Note: Kim Jong-un, as President of the State Affairs Commission is considered North Korea's "highest administrative authority". However, Choe Ryong-hae, as Chairman of the Standing Committee of the Supreme People's Assembly does many of the duties of a head of state. Deceased former North Korean rulers Kim Il Sung and Kim Jong Il are listed as the eternal leaders of Juche Korea.)	Premier	Cabinet	Supreme People's Assembly	1998
North Macedonia	President	President of the Government	Government	Assembly	1991
Norway	Monarch	Prime Minister	Council of State	Parliament	1814
Oman	Sultan	Prime Minister	Cabinet	Consultative Assembly	1971
Pakistan	President	Prime Minister	Cabinet	Parliament	2002
Palau	President		Cabinet	National Congress	1994
Palestine	President	Prime Minister	Cabinet	Legislative Council	1994
Panama	President		Cabinet	National Assembly	1972
Papua New Guinea	Monarch	Prime Minister	Cabinet	National Parliament	1975
Paraguay	President		Cabinet	Congress	1992
Peru	President	Prime Minister	Council of Ministers	Congress of the Republic	1993
Philippines	President		Cabinet	Congress	1987
Poland	President	Prime Minister	Council of Ministers	National Assembly	1997
Portugal	President	Prime Minister	Council of Ministers	Assembly of the Republic	1976
Qatar	Emir	Prime Minister	Cabinet	Consultative Assembly	2004
Romania	President	Prime Minister	Cabinet	Parliament	1991
Russia	President	Prime Minister	Government	Federal Assembly	1993
Rwanda	President	Prime Minister	Cabinet	Parliament	2003
Saint Kitts and Nevis	Monarch	Prime Minister	Cabinet	National Assembly	1983
Saint Lucia	Monarch	Prime Minister	Cabinet	Parliament	1979
Saint Vincent and the Grenadines	Monarch	Prime Minister	Cabinet	House of Assembly	1979
Samoa	O le Ao o le Malo	Prime Minister	Cabinet	Legislative Assembly	1962
San Marino	Captains Regent		Congress of State	Grand and General Council	1974 (Note: The Declaration of Citizen Rights enshrined the modern rights of Sammarinese citizens and is the current basis of the nation's judiciary system)
São Tomé and Príncipe	President	Prime Minister	Council of Ministers	National Assembly	1980
Saudi Arabia	King	Prime Minister	Council of Ministers	Consultative Assembly	1992
Senegal	President	Prime Minister	Cabinet	Parliament	2001
Serbia	President	Prime Minister	Cabinet	National Assembly	2006
Seychelles	President		Cabinet	National Assembly	1976
Sierra Leone	President		Cabinet	Parliament	1991
Singapore	President	Prime Minister	Cabinet	Parliament	1965
Slovakia	President	Prime Minister	Cabinet	National Council	1992
Slovenia	President	Prime Minister	Cabinet	Parliament	1991
Solomon Islands	Monarch	Prime Minister	Cabinet	National Parliament	1978
Somalia	President	Prime Minister	Council of Ministers	Parliament	2004
South Africa	President		Cabinet	Parliament	1996
South Korea	President		State Council	National Assembly	1987
South Sudan	President		Cabinet	Parliament	2011
Spain	King	President of the Government	Council of Ministers	Cortes Generales	1978
Sri Lanka	President	Prime Minister	Cabinet	Parliament	1978
Sudan	President		Cabinet	National Legislature	2021
Suriname	President		Cabinet	National Assembly	1987
Sweden	Monarch	Prime Minister	Government	Riksdag	1974
Switzerland	Federal Council			Federal Assembly	1848 or 1874
Syria	President		Cabinet	People's Assembly	2025
Tajikistan	President	Prime Minister	Council of Ministers	Supreme Assembly	1994
Tanzania	President	Prime Minister	Cabinet	National Assembly	1977
Thailand	Monarch	Prime Minister	Cabinet	National Assembly	2019
Timor-Leste	President	Prime Minister	Council of State	National Parliament	2002
Togo	President	Prime Minister	Council of Ministers	National Assembly	1992
Tonga	Monarch	Prime Minister	Cabinet	Legislative Assembly	1875
Trinidad and Tobago	President	Prime Minister	Cabinet	Parliament	1976
Tunisia	President	Prime Minister	Cabinet	Parliament	2014
Turkey	President		Cabinet	Grand National Assembly	1982
Turkmenistan	President		Cabinet	Assembly	1992
Tuvalu	Monarch	Prime Minister	Cabinet	Parliament	1978
Uganda	President	Prime Minister	Cabinet	Parliament	1995
Ukraine	President	Prime Minister	Cabinet of Ministers	Verkhovna Rada	1996
United Arab Emirates	President	Prime Minister	Cabinet	Federal National Council	1971
United Kingdom	Monarch	Prime Minister	Cabinet	Parliament	1721
United States	President		Cabinet	Congress	1789
Uruguay	President		Council of Ministers	General Assembly	1967
Uzbekistan	President	Prime Minister	Council of Ministers	Supreme Assembly	1992
Vanuatu	President	Prime Minister	Council of Ministers	Parliament	1980
Vatican City/Holy See	Sovereign	President of the Governorate	Governorate	Pontifical Commission	1929
Venezuela	President		Cabinet	National Assembly	1999
Vietnam	President (Note: As a one-party ruling communist state, General Secretary of the Communist Party of Vietnam holds higher authority over the President, serving as the de facto leader of Vietnam.)	Prime Minister	Government	National Assembly	1992
Yemen	President	Prime Minister	Council of Ministers	Assembly of Representatives	1991
Zambia	President		Cabinet	National Assembly	1991
Zimbabwe	President		Cabinet	Parliament	2013

== Other states ==
Country	Head of State	Head of Government	Cabinet	Legislature	Date of Origin
Abkhazia	President	Prime Minister	Government	People's Assembly	1994
Republic of China (commonly called "Taiwan")	President	Premier	Executive Yuan	National Assembly (Note: The National Assembly was de facto dissolved in 2005 with some functions transferred to the Legislative Yuan.)	1947 (with constitutional amendments in 1991)
Republic of China (commonly called "Taiwan")	President	Premier	Executive Yuan	Legislative Yuan	1947 (with constitutional amendments in 1991)
Republic of China (commonly called "Taiwan")	President	Premier	Executive Yuan	Control Yuan (Note: Role changed to a non-parliamentary institution in 1993.)	1947 (with constitutional amendments in 1991)
Cook Islands	Monarch	Premier		Parliament	1965
Kosovo	President	Prime Minister	Government	Assembly	2001
Niue	Monarch	Premier		Assembly	1974
Northern Cyprus	President	Prime Minister	Government	Assembly of the Republic	1985
Somaliland	President			Parliament	1991
South Ossetia	President	Prime Minister	Cabinet	Parliament	1991
Transnistria	President	Prime Minister	Government	Supreme Soviet	1991
Western Sahara	President	Prime Minister		National Council	1976

== See also ==
- List of current heads of state and government
- List of current governments
- Lists of government ministries by country
- List of national legislatures
- List of national supreme courts
