= List of current governments =

Current governments

This is a list of current governments.

== National governments ==
| Country | Government in current formation | Creation |
|---|---|---|
| Afghanistan | Akhund cabinet | 7 September 2021 |
| Albania | Fourth Rama government | 12 September 2025 |
| Algeria | Ghrieb government | 15 September 2025 |
| Andorra | Current Executive Council of Andorra | 17 May 2023 |
| Angola | Second cabinet of João Lourenço | 20 September 2022 |
| Antigua and Barbuda | Fourth Browne cabinet | 5 May 2026 |
| Argentina | Cabinet of Javier Milei | 10 December 2023 |
| Armenia | Fourth Pashinyan government | 2 August 2026 |
| Australia | Second Albanese ministry | 13 May 2025 |
| Austria | Stocker government | 3 March 2025 |
| Azerbaijan | 9th Government of Azerbaijan | 16 February 2024 |
| (The Bahamas) Bahamas | Second Davis cabinet | 15 May 2026 |
| Bahrain | Current Cabinet of Bahrain | 21 November 2022 |
| Bangladesh | Tarique ministry | 17 February 2026 |
| Barbados | Third Mottley ministry | 17 February 2026 |
| Belarus | Turchin government | 10 March 2025 |
| Belgium | De Wever government | 3 February 2025 |
| Belize | Second Briceño ministry | 17 November 2025 |
| Benin | Cabinet of Romuald Wadagni | 25 May 2026 |
| Bhutan | Second Tobgay cabinet | 28 January 2024 |
| Bolivia | Cabinet of Rodrigo Paz | 8 November 2025 |
| Bosnia and Herzegovina | Cabinet of Borjana Krišto | 25 January 2023 |
| Botswana | Boko cabinet | 1 November 2024 |
| Brazil | Second cabinet of Lula da Silva | 1 January 2023 |
| Brunei | Current Council of Cabinet Ministers | 7 June 2022 |
| Bulgaria | Radev government | 8 May 2026 |
| Burkina Faso | Ouédraogo cabinet | 7 December 2024 |
| Burundi | Cabinet of Évariste Ndayishimiye | 28 June 2020 |
| Cape Verde | Carvalho cabinet | 19 June 2026 |
| Cambodia | Manet cabinet | 22 August 2023 |
| Cameroon | Ngute government | 4 January 2019 |
| Canada | 30th Canadian Ministry | 14 March 2025 |
| Central African Republic | Moloua cabinet | 11 February 2022 |
| Chad | Third Halina government | 1 April 2026 |
| Chile | Cabinet of José Antonio Kast | 11 March 2026 |
| China | 14th State Council of China | 12 March 2023 |
| Colombia | Cabinet of Abelardo de la Espriella | 7 August 2026 |
| Comoros | Fourth cabinet of Azali Assoumani | 1 July 2024 |
| (Republic of the Congo) Congo | Makosso government | 15 May 2021 |
| Costa Rica | Government of Laura Fernández Delgado | 8 May 2026 |
| (Ivory Coast) Côte d'Ivoire | Second Mambé cabinet | 23 January 2026 |
| Croatia | Third Plenković cabinet | 17 May 2024 |
| Cuba | Marrero cabinet | 21 December 2019 |
| Cyprus | Government of Nikos Christodoulides | 1 March 2023 |
| Czech Republic | Third Babiš cabinet | 15 December 2025 |
| Democratic Republic of the Congo | Suminwa government | 12 June 2024 |
| Denmark | Third Frederiksen cabinet | 3 June 2026 |
| Djibouti | Current Council of Ministers | 17 May 2026 |
| Dominica | Fifth Skerrit cabinet | 13 December 2022 |
| Dominican Republic | Second cabinet of Luis Abinader | 16 August 2024 |
| (Timor-Leste) East Timor | Third Gusmão government | 1 July 2023 |
| Ecuador | Cabinet of Daniel Noboa | 23 November 2023 |
| Egypt | Second Madbouly cabinet | 3 July 2024 |
| El Salvador | Second cabinet of Nayib Bukele | 1 June 2024 |
| Equatorial Guinea | Osa cabinet | 16 August 2024 |
| Eritrea | Current Cabinet of Ministers | March 1994 |
| Estonia | Michal cabinet | 23 July 2024 |
| Eswatini | Dlamini cabinet | 13 November 2023 |
| Ethiopia | Abiy cabinet | 6 October 2021 |
| Fiji | Second Rabuka government | 24 December 2022 |
| Finland | Orpo cabinet | 20 June 2023 |
| France | Second Lecornu government | 10 October 2025 |
| Gabon | Second cabinet of Brice Oligui Nguema | 7 September 2023 |
| (The Gambia) Gambia | Second cabinet of Adama Barrow | 4 May 2022 |
| (Georgia (country)) Georgia | Second Kobakhidze government | 28 November 2024 |
| Germany | Merz cabinet | 6 May 2025 |
| Ghana | Cabinet of John Mahama | 20 February 2025 |
| Greece | Second Mitsotakis cabinet | 26 June 2023 |
| Grenada | Mitchell cabinet | 1 July 2022 |
| Guatemala | Cabinet of Bernardo Arévalo | 15 January 2024 |
| Guinea | Second Oury government | 26 January 2026 |
| Guinea-Bissau | High Military Command for the Restoration of National Security and Public Order | 26 November 2025 |
| Guyana | Second cabinet of Irfaan Ali | 19 September 2025 |
| Haiti | Fils-Aimé cabinet | 16 November 2024 |
| Honduras | Cabinet of Nasry Asfura | 27 January 2026 |
| Hungary | Magyar government | 9 May 2026 |
| Iceland | Frostadóttir cabinet | 21 December 2024 |
| India | Third Modi ministry | 9 June 2024 |
| Indonesia | Red and White Cabinet | 21 October 2024 |
| Iran | Government of Masoud Pezeshkian | 28 July 2024 |
| Iraq | Al-Zaidi government | 14 May 2026 |
| (Republic of Ireland) Ireland | Second Martin government | 23 January 2025 |
| Israel | 37th Government of Israel | 29 December 2022 |
| Italy | Meloni government | 22 October 2022 |
| Jamaica | Second Holness cabinet | 16 September 2025 |
| Japan | Second Takaichi cabinet | 18 February 2026 |
| Jordan | Hassan cabinet | 15 September 2024 |
| Kazakhstan | Second Bektenov government | 31 August 2026 |
| Kenya | Cabinet of William Ruto | 8 August 2024 |
| Kiribati | Third Maamau cabinet | 25 October 2024 |
| Kosovo | Fourth Kurti cabinet | 13 September 2026 |
| Kuwait | 39th Cabinet of Kuwait | 28 December 2021 |
| Kyrgyzstan | Kasymaliev cabinet | 18 December 2024 |
| Laos | 10th Government of Laos | 23 March 2026 |
| Latvia | Second Kulbergs cabinet | 17 November 2026 |
| Lebanon | Salam cabinet | 8 February 2025 |
| Lesotho | Matekane cabinet | 4 November 2022 |
| Liberia | Cabinet of Joseph Boakai | 22 January 2024 |
| Libya | Government of National Unity | 10 March 2021 |
| Liechtenstein | Brigitte Haas cabinet | 10 April 2025 |
| Lithuania | Sinkevičius cabinet | 14 July 2026 |
| Luxembourg | Frieden-Bettel government | 17 November 2023 |
| Madagascar | Council of the Presidency for the Re-Foundation of the Republic of Madagascar | 14 October 2025 |
| Malawi | Third cabinet of Peter Mutharika | 30 January 2026 |
| Malaysia | Anwar Ibrahim cabinet | 24 November 2022 |
| Maldives | Cabinet of Mohamed Muizzu | 17 November 2023 |
| Mali | Cabinet of Assimi Goïta | 21 November 2024 |
| Malta | Third Abela government | 4 June 2026 |
| Marshall Islands | Second cabinet of Hilda Heine | 3 January 2024 |
| Mauritania | Second Djay government | 11 October 2026 |
| Mauritius | Fourth Ramgoolam cabinet | 22 November 2024 |
| Mexico | Cabinet of Claudia Sheinbaum | 1 October 2024 |
| (Federated States of Micronesia) Micronesia | Cabinet of Wesley Simina | 11 May 2023 |
| Monaco | Mirmand cabinet | 21 July 2025 |
| Moldova | Tofan cabinet | 22 July 2026 |
| Mongolia | Uchral cabinet | 4 April 2026 |
| Montenegro | Spajić cabinet | 31 October 2023 |
| Morocco | El Mansouri government | 16 October 2026 |
| Mozambique | Cabinet of Daniel Chapo | 17 January 2025 |
| Myanmar | Second Min Aung Hlaing cabinet | 10 April 2026 |
| Namibia | Cabinet of Netumbo Nandi-Ndaitwah | 21 March 2025 |
| Nauru | Second cabinet of David Adeang | 11 October 2025 |
| Nepal | Balen Shah cabinet | 27 March 2026 |
| (Kingdom of the Netherlands) Netherlands | Jetten cabinet | 23 February 2026 |
| New Zealand | 6th National Government of New Zealand | 27 November 2023 |
| Nicaragua | Cabinet of Nicaragua | c. 2007 |
| Niger | National Council for the Safeguard of the Homeland | 9 April 2021 |
| Nigeria | Cabinet of Bola Tinubu | 16 August 2023 |
| North Korea | 15th Cabinet of North Korea | 22 March 2026 |
| North Macedonia | Second Mickoski cabinet | 15 May 2025 |
| Norway | Støre cabinet | 14 October 2021 |
| Oman | Current Cabinet of Oman | 12 January 2026 |
| Pakistan | Second Shehbaz Sharif ministry | 11 March 2024 |
| Palau | Second cabinet of Surangel Whipps Jr. | 21 January 2021 |
| Palestine | Mustafa government | 31 March 2024 |
| Panama | Cabinet of José Raúl Mulino | 1 July 2024 |
| Papua New Guinea | Second Marape cabinet | 23 August 2022 |
| Paraguay | Cabinet of Santiago Peña | 15 August 2023 |
| Peru | Cabinet of Keiko Fujimori | 28 July 2026 |
| Philippines | Cabinet of Bongbong Marcos | 30 June 2022 |
| Poland | Third Tusk cabinet | 13 December 2023 |
| Portugal | 25th Constitutional Government of Portugal | 5 June 2025 |
| Qatar | Current Cabinet of Qatar | 7 March 2023 |
| Romania | Niculescu cabinet | 20 October 2026 |
| Russia | Second Mishustin cabinet | 14 May 2024 |
| Rwanda | Nsengiyumva cabinet | 25 July 2025 |
| Saint Kitts and Nevis | Drew ministry | 15 August 2022 |
| Saint Lucia | Second Pierre cabinet | 12 December 2025 |
| Saint Vincent and the Grenadines | Friday cabinet | 28 November 2025 |
| Samoa | 18th Cabinet of Samoa | 16 September 2025 |
| San Marino | 31st Congress of State | 24 July 2024 |
| São Tomé and Príncipe | 29th Council of Ministers | 15 January 2025 |
| Saudi Arabia | Current Council of Ministers | 27 September 2022 |
| Senegal | Lo government | 1 June 2026 |
| Serbia | Macut cabinet | 16 April 2025 |
| Seychelles | Cabinet of Patrick Herminie | 12 November 2025 |
| Sierra Leone | Second cabinet of Julius Maada Bio | 10 July 2023 |
| Singapore | Second Lawrence Wong cabinet | 23 May 2025 |
| Slovakia | Fourth Fico cabinet | 25 October 2023 |
| Slovenia | Fourth Janša government | 4 June 2026 |
| Solomon Islands | Wale cabinet | 17 May 2026 |
| Somalia | Second Hamza cabinet | 2 August 2022 |
| South Africa | Third cabinet of Cyril Ramaphosa | 30 June 2024 |
| South Korea | Cabinet of Lee Jae Myung | 4 June 2025 |
| South Sudan | Revitalized Transitional Government of National Unity | 12 March 2020 |
| Spain | Third Sánchez government | 21 November 2023 |
| Sri Lanka | Second cabinet of Anura Kumara Dissanayake | 18 November 2024 |
| Sudan | Kamil Idris government | 31 May 2025 |
| Suriname | Cabinet of Jennifer Geerlings-Simons | 16 July 2025 |
| Sweden | Kristersson cabinet | 18 October 2022 |
| Switzerland | Current Federal Council | 1 January 2026 |
| Syria | Syrian transitional government | 8 December 2024 |
| Taiwan | Cabinet of Lai Ching-te | 20 May 2024 |
| Tajikistan | Current Cabinet of Tajikistan | 3 November 2024 |
| Tanzania | Suluhu cabinet | 31 March 2021 |
| Thailand | Second Anutin cabinet | 30 March 2026 |
| Togo | Gnassingbé cabinet | 8 October 2025 |
| Tonga | Fakafānua cabinet | 6 January 2026 |
| Trinidad and Tobago | Second Persad-Bissessar government | 1 May 2025 |
| Tunisia | Zaafarani cabinet | 20 March 2025 |
| Turkey | Fifth cabinet of Recep Tayyip Erdoğan | 3 June 2023 |
| Turkmenistan | Cabinet of Serdar Berdimuhamedow | 19 March 2022 |
| Tuvalu | Teo ministry | 26 February 2024 |
| Uganda | Seventh cabinet of Yoweri Museveni | 26 May 2026 |
| Ukraine | Koretskyi government | 16 July 2026 |
| United Arab Emirates | 15th Cabinet of the United Arab Emirates | 25 September 2021 |
| United Kingdom | Burnham ministry | 20 July 2026 |
| United States of America | Second cabinet of Donald Trump | 20 January 2025 |
| Uruguay | Cabinet of Yamandú Orsi | 1 March 2025 |
| Uzbekistan | Third Aripov cabinet | 20 November 2024 |
| Vanuatu | Napat cabinet | 11 February 2025 |
| Venezuela | Interim Cabinet of Ministers | 5 January 2026 |
| Vietnam | Hưng government | 8 April 2026 |
| Yemen | Presidential Leadership Council | 7 April 2022 |
| Zambia | Cabinet of Hakainde Hichilema | 24 August 2021 |
| Zimbabwe | Third cabinet of Emmerson Mnangagwa | 11 September 2023 |

== Sub-national and supranational governments ==
| Country | Government in current formation | Creation |
|---|---|---|
| Abkhazia | Delba cabinet | 3 April 2025 |
| Alberta | Smith ministry | 11 October 2022 |
| Andalusia | Third Moreno government | 9 July 2026 |
| Andhra Pradesh | Fourth N. Chandrababu Naidu ministry | 12 June 2024 |
| Aragon | Second Azcón government | 4 May 2026 |
| Arunachal Pradesh | Fifth Pema Khandu ministry | 13 June 2024 |
| Assam | Second Sarma ministry | 12 May 2026 |
| Asturias | Second Barbón government | 1 August 2023 |
| Australian Capital Territory | Fourth Barr ministry | 7 November 2024 |
| Baden-Württemberg | Özdemir cabinet | 13 May 2026 |
| Balearic Islands | Prohens government | 10 July 2023 |
| Balochistan | Sarfraz Bugti ministry | 2 March 2024 |
| Bangsamoro | Abdulraof Macacua government | 30 October 2026 |
| Basque Country | Pradales government | 25 June 2024 |
| Bihar | Choudhary ministry | 15 April 2026 |
| Brandenburg | Fifth Woidke cabinet | 18 March 2026 |
| Berlin | Wegner senate | 27 April 2023 |
| British Columbia | Doerkson ministry | 20 November 2026 |
| Bremen | Second Bovenschulte senate | 5 July 2023 |
| Canary Islands | Second Clavijo government | 15 July 2023 |
| Cantabria | Sáenz de Buruaga government | 5 July 2023 |
| Castilla–La Mancha | Third García-Page government | 8 July 2023 |
| Castile and León | Second Fernández Mañueco government | 20 April 2022 |
| Catalonia | Illa government | 12 August 2024 |
| Chhattisgarh | Sai ministry | 13 December 2023 |
| Delhi | Rekha Gupta ministry | 20 February 2025 |
| European Union | Second von der Leyen Commission | 1 December 2024 |
| Extremadura | Second Guardiola government | 30 April 2026 |
| Faroe Islands | Beinir Johannesen cabinet | 13 April 2026 |
| Galicia | Second Rueda government | 15 April 2024 |
| Goa | Second Pramod Sawant ministry | 28 March 2022 |
| Greenland | Nielsen cabinet | 7 April 2025 |
| Gujarat | Second Bhupendrabhai Patel Ministry | 12 December 2022 |
| Haryana | Second Saini ministry | 17 October 2024 |
| Hesse | Rhein cabinet | 31 May 2022 |
| Himachal Pradesh | Sukhu ministry | 27 December 2022 |
| Hong Kong | Lee government | 1 July 2022 |
| Jammu and Kashmir | Second Omar Abdullah ministry | 16 October 2024 |
| Jharkhand | Fourth Hemant Soren ministry | 28 November 2024 |
| Johor | Second Onn Hafiz EXCO | 12 July 2026 |
| Karnataka | D. K. Shivakumar ministry | 3 June 2026 |
| Kedah | Second Muhammad Sanusi EXCO | 14 August 2023 |
| Kelantan | Mohd Nassuruddin EXCO | 15 August 2023 |
| Kerala | Satheesan ministry | 18 May 2026 |
| Khyber Pakhtunkhwa | Afridi provincial government | 15 October 2025 |
| La Rioja | Capellán government | 2 July 2023 |
| Lower Saxony | Lies cabinet | 20 May 2025 |
| Madhya Pradesh | Mohan Yadav ministry | 13 December 2023 |
| Madrid | Third Díaz Ayuso government | 23 June 2023 |
| Maharashtra | Third Fadnavis ministry | 5 December 2024 |
| Malacca | Ab Rauf EXCO | 31 March 2023 |
| Manipur | Yumnam Khemchand Singh ministry | 4 February 2026 |
| Manitoba | Kinew ministry | 18 October 2023 |
| Mecklenburg-Vorpommern | Second Schwesig cabinet | 15 November 2021 |
| Meghalaya | Second Conrad Sangma ministry | 6 March 2023 |
| Mizoram | Lalduhoma ministry | 8 December 2023 |
| Murcia | Third López Miras government | 14 September 2023 |
| Nagaland | Fifth Rio ministry | 8 March 2023 |
| Navarre | Second Chivite government | 18 August 2023 |
| Negeri Sembilan | Ismail Lasim EXCO | 2 August 2026 |
| Newfoundland and Labrador | Wakeham ministry | 29 October 2025 |
| New South Wales | Minns ministry | 25 March 2023 |
| New York | Cabinet of Zohran Mamdani | 1 January 2026 |
| Northern Ireland | Executive of the 7th Northern Ireland Assembly | 3 February 2024 |
| Northern Territory | Finocchiaro ministry | 28 August 2024 |
| Odisha | Majhi ministry | 12 June 2024 |
| Ontario | Ford ministry | 29 June 2018 |
| Pahang | Second Wan Rosdy EXCO | 28 November 2022 |
| Penang | Second Chow EXCO | 13 August 2023 |
| Perak | Second Saarani EXCO | 21 November 2022 |
| Perlis | Abu Bakar EXCO | 28 December 2025 |
| Puducherry | Fifth Rangaswamy ministry | 13 May 2026 |
| Punjab | Mann ministry | 16 March 2022 |
| Punjab | Maryam Nawaz provincial government | 6 March 2024 |
| Quebec | St-Pierre Plamondon ministry | 21 October 2026 |
| Queensland | Crisafulli ministry | 28 October 2024 |
| Rajasthan | Sharma ministry | 17 December 2023 |
| Rhineland-Palatinate | Schnieder cabinet | 18 May 2026 |
| Saarland | Rehlinger cabinet | 25 April 2022 |
| Sabah | Second Hajiji cabinet | 1 December 2025 |
| Sarawak | Second Abang Johari cabinet | 4 January 2022 |
| Saxony | Third Kretschmer cabinet | 19 December 2024 |
| Saxony-Anhalt | Schulze cabinet | 28 January 2026 |
| Schleswig-Holstein | Second Günther cabinet | 29 June 2022 |
| Scotland | Second Swinney government | 20 May 2026 |
| Selangor | Second Amirudin EXCO | 21 August 2023 |
| Sikkim | Second Tamang ministry | 10 June 2024 |
| Sindh | Second Murad Ali Shah ministry | 12 March 2024 |
| Sint Maarten | Second Mercelina cabinet | 21 May 2024 |
| South Australia | Second Malinauskas ministry | 25 March 2026 |
| South Ossetia | Margiev cabinet | 22 October 2026 |
| Saint Pierre and Miquelon | Briand cabinet | 1 April 2022 |
| Taiwan | Cho cabinet | 20 May 2024 |
| Tamil Nadu | C. Joseph Vijay ministry | 10 May 2026 |
| Tasmania | Third Rockliff ministry | 11 August 2025 |
| Telangana | Revanth Reddy ministry | 7 December 2023 |
| Terengganu | Second Ahmad Samsuri EXCO | 15 August 2023 |
| Transnistria | Second Rozenberg cabinet | 30 May 2022 |
| Tripura | Second Saha ministry | 14 May 2022 |
| Turks and Caicos Islands | Third W. Misick ministry | 13 February 2025 |
| Uttar Pradesh | Second Yogi Adityanath ministry | 25 March 2022 |
| Uttarakhand | Second Dhami ministry | 23 March 2022 |
| Valencian Community | Pérez Llorca government | 3 December 2025 |
| Victoria | Carroll ministry | 28 July 2026 |
| Wales | ap Iorwerth government | 12 May 2026 |
| West Bengal | Suvendu Adhikari ministry | 9 May 2026 |
| Western Australia | Cook ministry | 19 March 2025 |

== See also ==
- List of current heads of state and government
- List of current heads of government in the United Kingdom and dependencies
- List of national governments
