= Former countries in Europe after 1815 =

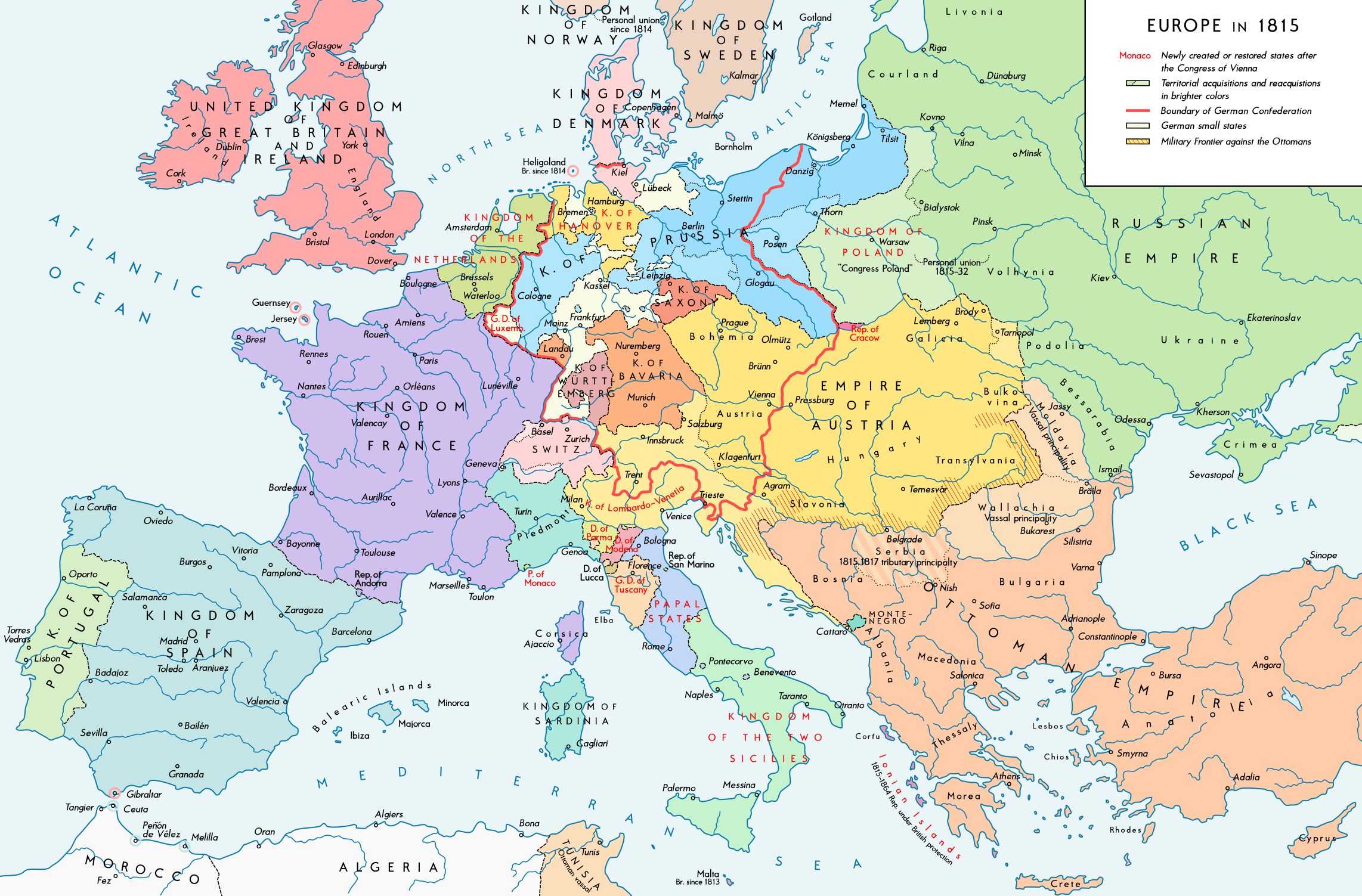
A map of Europe as it appeared in 1815 after the Congress of Vienna.

This article gives a detailed listing of all the countries, including puppet states, that have existed in Europe since the Congress of Vienna in 1815 to the present day. Each country has information separated into columns: name of the distinct country, its lifespan, the country or countries that hold all or some of the territory it once did, and further information about it.

== Article scope ==
The scope of this article begins in 1815, after a round of negotiations about European borders and spheres of influence were agreed upon at the Congress of Vienna. The Congress of Vienna was a nine-month, pan-European meeting of statesmen who met to settle the many issues arising from the destabilising impact of the French Revolutionary Wars, the Napoleonic Wars, and the dissolution of the Holy Roman Empire.

The immediate background was Napoleonic France's defeat and surrender in May 1814, which brought an end to twenty-five years of nearly continuous war during which France had caused the annexation or geopolitical reorganisation of myriad European microstates as well as some larger ones. The Congress of Vienna was the first of a series of international meetings that came to be known as the Concert of Europe, which was an attempt to forge a peaceful balance of power in Europe, including restoring or reorganising many of the states which had previously been removed from Europe's political map.

== Sovereign countries ==
This is a list of all the independent countries or puppet states that existed between 1815 and the present day that no longer exist. (Lifespan of each is based on that country's sovereignty. This means that those countries may have existed outside of those dates as well but not under full independence.)

Former countries	Establishment	Dissolution	Today part of	Notes	Flag
Anhalt (Duchy)	1813	1867	Germany	Became a member of the North German Confederation Federal State.	
Armenia (Democratic Republic)	1918	1920	Armenia, Azerbaijan and Turkey	The Democratic Republic of Armenia emerged as an independent state in the wake of the Russian Revolution, which led to the collapse of the Russian Empire. However, it was invaded and incorporated in the Soviet Union in 1922.	
Artsakh	1991	2023	Azerbaijan	Artsakh (also known as the Nagorno-Karabakh Republic) declared its independence from Azerbaijan in 1991 amidst the First Nagorno-Karabakh War. After the 1994 ceasefire that ended the war, the situation remained stable until the Second Nagorno-Karabakh War in 2020, which saw an Azerbaijani victory. As a result, Artsakh's territory was substantially reduced and it became an enclave within Azerbaijan. Following the 2023 Azerbaijani offensive in Nagorno-Karabakh, Artsakh agreed to disarm itself, with the country's president agreeing to dissolve all government institutions by 1 January 2024.	
Austrian Empire	1804	1867	Austria, Hungary, Czech Republic, Slovakia, Poland, Ukraine, Romania, Serbia, Italy, Slovenia, Croatia	This entity founded on the domains of the Habsburg monarchy can be regarded in constitutional law as a unitary monarchy on a differentiated federalistic basis, whereby the special position of Hungary within the framework of this federal entity was a separate realm ruled in a personal union that was not annexed or incorporated into the Empire.	
Austro-Hungarian Empire (Dual Monarchy)	1867	1918	Austria, Hungary, Czech Republic, Slovakia, Poland, Ukraine, Romania, Serbia, Italy, Slovenia, Croatia, Bosnia & Herzegovina	By the Austro-Hungarian Compromise of 1867, the Austrian Empire and the Kingdom of Hungary formed a joint monarchy with a Habsburg Monarch having some common institutions though leaving the status and internal affairs of the two countries separate.	
Avar Khanate	13th century	1864	Russia	Comprised Circassia and Dagestan; it was the last country in the Caucasus to be annexed by the Russian Empire: Dagestan in 1859 and Circassia in 1864.	
Azerbaijan (Democratic Republic)	1918	1920	Azerbaijan	The Azerbaijan Democratic Republic emerged as an independent state in the wake of the Russian Revolution, which led to the collapse of the Russian Empire. However, it was invaded and eventually incorporated in the Soviet Union in 1922.	
Baden (Grand Duchy)	1806	1871	Germany	Joined the German Empire and became one of its members.	
Bavaria (Kingdom)	1806	1871	Germany	Joined the German Empire and became one of its members.	
Belarus (People's Republic)	1918	1919	Belarus	Gained independence from the Russian Empire and quickly was swallowed by the Soviets. Currently, its Rada (Council) is the oldest government in exile still functioning.	
Bremen (Free City)	1813	1867	Germany	Became a member of the North German Confederation Federal State	
Brunswick (Duchy)	1815	1867	Germany	Became a member of the North German Confederation Federal State	
Carpatho-Ukraine	1938	1939	Ukraine	It was an autonomous region within Czechoslovakia from late 1938 to 15 March 1939. It declared itself an independent republic on 15 March 1939 but was annexed by Hungary between 15 and 16 March 1939, remaining under Hungarian control until the end of World War II, when it was ceded to the Soviet Union.	
Chechen Republic of Ichkeria	1991	2000	Russia	Seceded from the Soviet Union in 1990 as the “Republic of Chechno-Ingushetia”, renamed the “Chechen Republic” until 1994 following Ingushetia voting to rejoin Russia. Invaded by Russia in 1994-1996 and again in 1999- being fully occupied in 2000.	
Cospaia	1440	1826	Italy	By error, a small strip of land went unmentioned in a sale treaty, and its inhabitants promptly declared independence; nearly 400 years later it was absorbed into the Papal States and Tuscany equally.	
Couto Misto	10th century	1864	Spain and Portugal	Neutral territory between Portugal and Spain which was divided between Portugal and Spain in 1864.	
Crimea (Republic)	2014	2014	Ukraine (disputed with Russia)	Unrecognized state which gained independence after a referendum and then joined Russia a day later.	
Croatia (puppet state of Nazi Germany)	1941	1945	Croatia, Bosnia and Herzegovina, Serbia	A puppet state of Nazi Germany during World War II.	
Czechoslovak Republic (First)	1918	1938	Czech Republic, Slovakia, Ukraine	Democratic unified government of the Czechs and Slovaks after World War I	
Czechoslovak Republic (Second)	1938	1939	Czech Republic, Slovakia, Ukraine	Democratic unified government of the Czechs and Slovaks after World War I	
Czechoslovak Republic (Third)	1945	1948	Czech Republic, Slovakia, Ukraine	Democratic unified government of the Czechs and Slovaks after World War I	
Czechoslovakia (People's Republic)	1948	1992	Czech Republic, Slovakia	Communist government of the Czechs and Slovaks after World War II behind the Iron Curtain.	
Danzig (League of Nations)	1920	1939	Poland	Protectorate of the League of Nations; annexed by Nazi Germany during the invasion of Poland in World War II.	
Federal State of Austria	1934	1938	Austria	One-party state government opposed to unification with Germany, which was then annexed by Germany.	
Finnish Democratic Republic	1939	1940	Russia	A puppet state of the Soviet Union during World War II created from southern Finland which was quickly annexed into the Soviet Union	
First Austrian Republic	1918	1934	Austria	Successor to the Austro-Hungarian Empire, and predecessor to the Federal State of Austria.	
Fiume (Free State)	1920	1924	Croatia	Formed from Austro-Hungarian territory at the end of World War I, it was later divided between the Kingdom of Serbs, Croats and Slovenes and the Kingdom of Italy.	
Frankfurt (Free City)	1816	1866	Germany	Annexed by Prussia in 1866	
Gurian Republic	1905	1906	Georgia	Part of the Russian Empire.	
German Democratic Republic	1949	1990	Germany	Also known as East Germany, this was the Soviet-controlled government of Germany after World War II.	
Georgia (Democratic Republic)	1918	1921	Georgia	The Democratic Republic of Georgia emerged in the wake of Russian Revolution and existed from 1918 to 1921. In 1921, it was invaded by Bolshevik Russia and forcibly incorporated into the Soviet Union in 1922.	
German Empire	1871	1918	Germany, Poland, Russia, France, Denmark, Lithuania, Belgium, Burundi, Rwanda, Tanzania, Namibia, Togo, Ghana, Cameroon, Gabon, Congo, Central African Republic, Chad, Nigeria, Papua New Guinea, Solomon Islands, Federated States of Micronesia, Palau, Samoa	The German Empire was the first unified, centralized German nation, created after the North German victory in the Franco-Prussian War. It was also a colonial empire, with territories outside of Europe.	
Greece (Kingdom)	1832	1924	Greece, Turkey		
Greece (4th of August Regime)	1936	1941	Greece, Turkey		
Greece (Kingdom)	1944	1974	Greece, Turkey		
Hamburg (Free City)	1813	1867	Germany	Became a member of the North German Confederation Federal State	
Hanover (Kingdom)	1814	1866	Germany	In personal union with the United Kingdom of Great Britain and Ireland until the ascension of Queen Victoria in 1837; annexed by the Kingdom of Prussia in 1866.	
Hesse (Grand Duchy)	1806	1871	Germany	Northern part became a member of the North German Confederation in 1867. When North Germany became the German Empire in 1871, the southern part joined as well.	
Hesse-Homburg	1622	1866	Germany	Annexed by Prussia in 1866	
Hesse-Kassel	1813	1866	Germany	Annexed by Prussia in 1866	
Hohenzollern-Hechingen	1576	1850	Germany	Annexed by Prussia in 1850	
Hohenzollern-Sigmaringen	1576	1850	Germany	Annexed by Prussia in 1850	
Italian Social Republic	1943	1945	Italy	A puppet state of Nazi Germany during World War II	
Kingdom of Italy	1861	1946	Italy, Slovenia, Croatia, Greece, Libya, Albania, Eritrea, Somalia, Ethiopia	The Kingdom of Italy was the first unified, centralized Italian nation, created after the Expedition of the Thousand. It was also a colonial empire, with territories outside of Europe.	
Irish Republic	1919	1922	United Kingdom, Ireland	Partly recognized, revolutionary state. Declared its independence in 1919 after the 1918 election during the Irish War of Independence. Partitioned into the Irish Free State and United Kingdom of Great Britain and Northern Ireland after the 1921 Anglo-Irish Treaty.	
Kraków (Free City)	1815	1846	Poland	Protectorate of the Kingdom of Prussia, the Russian Empire and the Empire of Austria, later annexed into the Austrian Empire	
Kuban People's Republic	1917	1920	Russia	From the fall of the Russian Empire in 1917 until it was annexed by the Russian SFSR it existed as a small short-lived country in the Northern Caucasus and has never regained its independence	
Kingdom of Hungary	1000	1918	Hungary, Slovakia, Ukraine, Romania, Serbia, Croatia, Austria, Poland	The historical kingdom's territorial continuity has been altered more times during its lifespan, however was permanently restored after the Austro-Hungarian Compromise of 1867.	
Kingdom of Hungary	1920	1946	Hungary, Slovakia, Ukraine, Romania, Serbia, Croatia, Austria, Poland	1920 formation by Treaty of Trianon. Two-thirds of pre-WWI territory was repartitioned to other countries. Regency was established until overthrow of the kingdom in 1944.	
Lichtenberg (Principality)	1815	1834	Germany	Owned by a branch of the Saxe-Coburgs; sold to the Kingdom of Prussia in 1834	
Lippe (Principality)	1123	1867	Germany	Became a member of the North German Confederation Federal State	
Lübeck (Free City)	1815	1867	Germany	Became a member of the North German Confederation Federal State	
Lucca (Duchy)	1815	1847	Italy	Annexed by Tuscany in 1847	
Massa and Carrara (Duchy)	1473	1829	Italy	Annexed by Modena and Reggio in 1829	
Mecklenburg-Schwerin	1352	1867	Germany	Became a member of the North German Confederation Federal State	
Free Cities of Menton and Roquebrune	1848	1849	France	The Free Cities of Menton and Roquebrune seceded from Monaco in 1848. In November 1849 they were annexed by Sardinia, and in 1861 were annexed by France.	
Modena and Reggio (Duchy)	1814	1859	Italy	Joined the United Provinces of Central Italy, (one of the predecessors of the Kingdom of Italy)	
Moldavian Democratic Republic	1918	1918	Moldova	From the fall of the Russian Empire in 1917 until 1918, when this republic united with the Kingdom of Romania, the Moldavian Democratic Republic existed as one of the Imperial Russian successor countries in Europe.	
Montenegro (Kingdom)	1910	1918	Montenegro	A kingdom which was annexed by Serbia during the Serbian Expansion after World War I to create Yugoslavia	
Montenegro (Principality)	1878	1910	Montenegro	Predecessor of the Kingdom of Montenegro	
Mountainous Republic of the Northern Caucasus	1917	1920	Russia	From the fall of the Russian Empire in 1917 until 1920 this country existed for a short time before annexation by the Russian SFSR and never has regained independence	
Nassau (Duchy)	1806	1866	Germany	Annexed by Prussia in 1866	
Oldenburg (Grand Duchy)	1180	1867	Germany	Became a member of the North German Confederation Federal State	
Ottoman Empire	1299	1923	Turkey, Bosnia & Herzegovina, Serbia, Romania, Montenegro, Albania, North Macedonia, Bulgaria, Greece, Hungary, Moldova, Ukraine, Russia, Iraq, Syria, Kuwait, Lebanon, Israel, Palestine, Egypt, Saudi Arabia, Libya, Tunisia, Algeria	One of the longest lasting empires in history, this empire rose out of the Near East and fluctuated drastically in territory and economic status throughout its history; it was dissolved after its defeat in World War I.	
Papal States	752	1870	Italy	The entire eastern region joined the United Provinces of Central Italy, (one of the predecessors of the Kingdom of Italy); however, the remaining strip of land along the west coast did not join Italy until it was annexed in 1870.	
Parma (Duchy)	1814	1859	Italy	Joined the United Provinces of Central Italy, (one of the predecessors of the Kingdom of Italy)	
Protectorate of Bohemia and Moravia	1939	1945	Czech Republic	A puppet state of Nazi Germany during World War II.	
Prussia (Kingdom)	1701	1867	Germany, Poland, Denmark, Russia	Became the leading member of the North German Confederation Federal State	
Reuss Junior Line	1806	1867	Germany	Became a member of the North German Confederation Federal State (a region of Anhalt)	
Reuss Elder Line	1778	1867	Germany	Became a member of the North German Confederation Federal State (a region of Anhalt)	
Russian SFSR	1917	1922	Belarus, Kazakhstan, Kyrgyzstan, Russia, Tajikistan, Turkmenistan, Uzbekistan	From the fall of the Russian Empire in 1917 until 1922 the Russian SFSR was an independent communist state comprising almost all of the territory the Russian Empire had possessed in its final years; in 1922 it became the leading and dominating state in the Soviet Union until the union's end in 1991	
Saar (League of Nations)	1920	1935	Germany	League of Nations mandate within Weimar Germany	
Saar (French protectorate)	1947	1956	Germany	French-administered region which was later given to West Germany	
San Marco Republic	1848	1849	Italy	Revolutionary state, existing for 17 months in 1848–49. Based on the Venetian Lagoon, it extended into most of Venetia, or the Terraferma territory of the Venetian Republic.	
Sardinia (Kingdom)	1720	1861	Italy, France	Comprised the Italian regions of Sardinia and Piedmont; the leading state that unified the Italian Peninsula.	
Saxe-Altenburg	1826	1867	Germany	Became a member of the North German Confederation Federal State (a province of Thuringia)	
Saxe-Coburg and Gotha	1826	1867	Germany	Became a member of the North German Confederation Federal State (a province of Thuringia)	
Saxe-Coburg-Saalfeld	1699	1826	Germany	Merged to form Saxe-Coburg and Gotha in 1826	
Saxe-Gotha-Altenburg	1680	1826	Germany	Merged to form Saxe-Coburg and Gotha in 1826	
Saxe-Meiningen	1675	1867	Germany	Became a member of the North German Confederation Federal State (a province of Thuringia)	
Saxe-Weimar-Eisenach	1809	1867	Germany	Became a member of the North German Confederation Federal State (a province of Thuringia)	
Saxony (Kingdom)	1806	1867	Germany	Became a member of the North German Confederation Federal State	
Schaumburg-Lippe	1643	1867	Germany	Became a member of the North German Confederation Federal State	
Schleswig (Duchy)	1864	1866	Germany, Denmark	Independence from Denmark in 1864; annexed by Prussia in 1866	
Schwarzburg-Rudolstadt	1599	1867	Germany	Became a member of the North German Confederation Federal State (a province of Thuringia)	
Schwarzburg-Sondershausen	1599	1867	Germany	Became a member of the North German Confederation Federal State (a province of Thuringia)	
Serbia (Kingdom)	1882	1918	Serbia, North Macedonia	Predecessor of the Kingdom of Yugoslavia which was formed from the annexations of other states	
Serbia (Principality)	1815	1882	Serbia	Predecessor of the Kingdom of Serbia	
Septinsular Republic	1800	1815	Greece	An archipelagic republic that existed from 1800 to 1807 under nominal Ottoman sovereignty in the Ionian Islands and then under the French Empire.	
Slovak State	1939	1945	Slovakia	A puppet state of Nazi Germany during World War II	
State of Slovenes, Croats and Serbs	1918	1918	Slovenia, Croatia, Bosnia & Herzegovina, Serbia	A short-lived, independent country which was annexed by Serbia during the Serbian Expansion after World War I to create Yugoslavia	
Transcaucasian Democratic Federative Republic	1918	1918	Georgia, Armenia, Azerbaijan	Following the fall of the Russian Empire, Transaucasian Democratic Federative Republic was formed but dissolved after only two months.	
Trieste (Free Territory)	1947	1975	Italy, Slovenia, Croatia	De facto split in 1954 between neighbouring countries Italy and Yugoslavia, it was formally removed in 1975 with an agreement between these two countries	
Tuscany (Grand Duchy)	1815	1859	Italy	Joined the United Provinces of Central Italy, (one of the predecessors of the Kingdom of Italy)	
Two Sicilies (Kingdom)	1816	1860	Italy	Comprised the Italian regions of Naples and Sicily; was annexed by the Kingdom of Sardinia in March 1860	
Ukraine (People's Republic)	1918	1921	Ukraine	Declared independence from the Russian Empire, then later absorbed into the Soviet Union.	
Union of Soviet Socialist Republics	1922	1991	Russia, Belarus, Ukraine, Moldova, Georgia, Armenia, Azerbaijan, Estonia, Latvia, Lithuania, Kazakhstan, Uzbekistan, Tajikistan, Turkmenistan, Kyrgyzstan	One of the greatest superpowers in modern times comprising most of the territory that once was under the Russian Empire including some new territory after World War II in Europe annexed from Germany, Poland and Czechoslovakia	
United Kingdom of the Netherlands	1815	1839	Netherlands, Belgium, Luxembourg	Unified sovereign state of the Dutch lands after the crush of Napoleon; only the area of Luxembourg was part of the German Confederation	
United Provinces of Central Italy	1859	1860	Italy	First step of Italian unification comprising Tuscany, Parma, Modena and Reggio, and the eastern region of the Papal States; was annexed by the Kingdom of Sardinia in March 1860	
United States of the Ionian Islands	1815	1864	Greece	Was a state and amical protectorate of the United Kingdom. It was the successor state of the Septinsular Republic	
Waldeck-Pyrmont	1180	1867	Germany	Became a member of the North German Confederation Federal State	
Weimar Germany	1919	1933	Germany, Poland, Russia	First German democracy	
West Ukrainian People's Republic	1918	1919	Ukraine, Poland	Unrecognized successor state of Ukrainians after the fall of the Austro-Hungarian Empire	
Württemberg (Kingdom)	1806	1871	Germany	Joined the German Empire and became one of its members	
Yugoslavia (Federal Republic)	1992	2006	Serbia, Montenegro, Bosnia & Herzegovina	Democratic Yugoslavia after the fall of communism; Bosnia & Herzegovina gained independence between 1991 and 1993; Renamed to Serbia and Montenegro in 2003.	
Yugoslavia (Kingdom)	1918	1941	Serbia, Slovenia, Croatia, Bosnia & Herzegovina, Montenegro, North Macedonia	Unified Slavic country after World War I	
Yugoslavia (Socialist/Peoples's Federal Republic)	1944	1992	Serbia, Slovenia, Croatia, Bosnia & Herzegovina, Montenegro, North Macedonia	Communist government of the south Slavic ethnicities after World War II outside of the Iron Curtain	

== Autonomous countries or incorporated protectorates ==
This is a list of all the dependencies of countries that existed between 1815 and the present day that no longer exist. (Lifespan of each is based on that country's autonomy. This means that those countries may have existed outside of those dates as well, but as independent countries.)

Former dependencies	Establishment	Dissolution	Within present-day countries	Further information	Flag
Abkhazia (Principality)	1810	1864	Georgia	The principality was actually in existence since the 12th century and even managed to keep its autonomous home rule after being conquered by the Ottoman Empire in the 15th and 16th centuries; the autonomous principality was transferred to the Russian Empire in 1810 and was completely dissolved and assimilated into Russia by 1864	
Bulgaria (Principality)	1878	1908	Bulgaria, Serbia	During the Russian-Turkish Wars of 1878, and the independence of Montenegro, Serbia and Romania, Bulgaria gained autonomous status within the Ottoman Empire; the principality gained complete independence in 1908	
Cretan State	1898	1913	Greece	After several rebellions against the Ottoman Empire the island of Crete became an autonomous state under de jure suzerainty of the Ottoman Empire but with de facto independence secured by European Great Powers; after 15 years joined the Kingdom of Greece	
Erivan (Khanate)	1604	1828	Armenia	It was an autonomous region of the Persian Empire since 1604 and was annexed by the Russian Empire in 1828	
Finland (Grand Duchy)	1809	1918	Finland, Russia	An autonomous monarchy of the Russian Empire, with the Russian Tsar as its grand duke	
Guria (Principality)	1810	1829	Georgia	The principality had existed since the 15th century and even managed to keep its autonomous home rule after being conquered by the Ottoman Empire in the 16th century; the autonomous principality was transferred to the Russian Empire in 1810 and was completely dissolved and assimilated into Russia by 1829	
Lombardy–Venetia	1815	1866	Italy	Comprised the Italian regions of Lombardy and Venetia; an autonomous kingdom within the Austrian Empire	
Mingrelia (Principality)	1803	1857	Georgia	The principality had existed since the 4th century BC, and even managed to keep its autonomous home rule after being conquered by the Ottoman Empire in the 16th century; the autonomous principality was transferred to the Russian Empire in 1803 and was completely dissolved and assimilated into Russia by 1857	
Montenegro (Principality)	1815	1878	Montenegro	After being a puppet state of Napoleon's Europe it regained autonomous status within the Ottoman Empire until its independence in 1878 with Russian support	
Moresnet	1816	1919	Belgium	In 1816 Neutral Moresnet became a territory under common administration of the Netherlands and Prussia. The Netherlands were replaced by Belgium in 1830. After World War I in 1919 the territory was ceded to Belgium by Germany under Treaty of Versailles and formally annexed in 1920.	
Nakhchevan (Khanate)	1747	1828	Azerbaijan, Armenia	An autonomous region of the Persian Empire since 1747; annexed by the Russian Empire in 1828	
Poland (protectorate)	1815	1830	Poland, Lithuania	An autonomous monarchy of the Russian Empire with the Russian Tsar as its king; at home it was called the ‘Kingdom of Poland’, but internationally known as Congress Poland and functioned more like a protectorate	
Romania (Principality)	1859	1878	Romania	In 1859 Moldavia and Wallachia unified into the United Principalities and gained autonomous status within the Ottoman Empire until its independence in 1878 with Russian support	
Serbia (Principality)	1817	1878	Serbia	A rebellion broke out in 1804 and 1817 Serbia gained autonomous status within the Ottoman Empire until its independence in 1878 with Russian support	

== Proposed states ==
This is a list of all the independent countries that could or would have existed between 1815 and the present day that for some reason or another never did.

Proposed states	Proposed formation	Current states	Notes	Flag
United Baltic Duchy	1918	Estonia and Latvia	An idea first brought forth by the Germans but was rejected after the Versailles Treaty and the Baltic Region became the three present day countries	
United States of Greater Austria	1905	Austria, Hungary, Czech Republic, Slovakia, Poland, Ukraine, Romania, Serbia, Italy, Slovenia, Croatia	A concept brought forth by the Habsburgs in reaction to tensions within the empire of autonomy; the autocratic empire would be changed into a united autonomous country where each nation governed itself with some support from a much weaker Habsburg monarchy	
Intermarium	1918	Poland, Lithuania, Latvia, Estonia, Finland, Belarus, Ukraine, Hungary, Romania, Yugoslavia and Czechoslovakia	It was a geopolitical project conceived by politicians in successor states of the former Polish–Lithuanian Commonwealth in several iterations, some of which anticipated the inclusion as well of other, neighboring states. The proposed multinational polity would have extended across territories lying between the Baltic and Black Seas, hence the Latinate name Intermarium, meaning "Between-Seas".	

== See also ==
- List of historic states of Germany
- List of historic states of Italy

General

- List of former sovereign states
- Political history of the world
