= Kabul Shahi =

Kabul Shahi is a term used to denote two former non-Muslim dynasties based in Kabul:

- Turk Shahis (665–822 CE)
- Hindu Shahis (822–1026 CE)
