= Djibouti =

Country in the Horn of Africa

Republic of Djibouti
(in official languages)
Arabic	جمهورية جيبوتي
French	République de Djibouti
(in national languages)
Afar	Gabuutih Ummuuno
Somali	Jamhuuriyadda Jabuuti
- Flag Emblem
- Motto: Midnimo, Sinnaan, Nabad (Somali); Inkittiino, Qeedala, Wagari (Afar); Unité, Égalité, Paix (French) اتحاد، مساواة، سلام (Arabic); Unity, Equality, Peace (English)
- Anthem: Djibouti
- Capital and largest city: Djibouti City; 11°36′N 43°10′E
- Official languages: Arabic; French
- National languages: Somali; Afar
- Ethnic groups: Somalis 60%; Afar 35%; Arabs 5%
- Religion: 94% Islam (official); 87% Sunni; 8% non-denominational; 2% Shia; 3% other; 6% Christianity
- Demonym: Djiboutian
- Government: Unitary presidential republic under a hereditary dictatorship
  - President: Ismaïl Omar Guelleh
  - Prime Minister: Abdoulkader Kamil Mohamed
- Legislature: National Assembly

Formation
  - Independence from France: 27 June 1977
  - Current constitution: 4 September 1992

Area
  - Total: 23,200 km^{2} (9,000 sq mi) (146th)
  - Water (%): 0.09 (20 km^{2} / 7.7 sq mi)

Population
  - 2024 census: ▲1,066,809
  - Density: 46.0/km^{2} (119.1/sq mi) (168th)
- GDP (PPP): 2023 estimate
  - Total: ▲$7.193 billion (167th)
  - Per capita: ▲$6,985 (137th)
- GDP (nominal): 2023 estimate
  - Total: ▲$3.873 billion (172nd)
  - Per capita: ▲$3,761 (126th)
- Gini (2017): ▲41.6 medium inequality
- HDI (2023): ▲0.513 low (175th)
- Currency: Djiboutian franc (DJF)
- Time zone: UTC+3 (EAT)
- Calling code: +253
- ISO 3166 code: DJ
- Internet TLD: .dj

Djibouti, (Note: /dʒɪˈbuːti/ jih-BOO-tee; Arabic: جيبوتي, romanized: Jībūtī; French: Djibouti; Somali: Jabuuti; Afar: Yibuuti) officially the Republic of Djibouti, (Note: Arabic: جمهورية جيبوتي, romanized: Jumhūriyyat Jībūtī; French: République de Djibouti; Somali: Jamhuuriyadda Jabuuti; Afar: Gabuutih Ummuuno) is a country in the Horn of Africa, bordered by Somalia (Note: The Djiboutian–Somali border is de jure controlled by the internationally recognized Federal Republic of Somalia, but is de facto under the control of the partially recognized Republic of Somaliland.) to the south, Ethiopia to the southwest, Eritrea in the north, and the Red Sea and the Gulf of Aden to the east. The country has an area of 23,200 km^{2} (8,958 sq mi).

In antiquity, the territory, together with Ethiopia, Eritrea and Somaliland, was part of the Land of Punt. Nearby Zeila, now in Somaliland, was the seat of the medieval Adal and Ifat Sultanates. In the late 19th century, the colony of French Somaliland was established after the ruling Dir-Somali, and Afar sultans signed treaties with the French, and its railroad to Dire Dawa (and later Addis Ababa) allowed it to quickly supersede Zeila as the port for southern Ethiopia and the Ogaden. It was renamed the French Territory of the Afars and the Issas in 1967. A decade later, the Djiboutian people voted for independence. This officially marked the establishment of the Republic of Djibouti, named after its capital city. The new state joined the United Nations in its first year. In the early 1990s, tensions over government representation led to armed conflict, which ended in a power-sharing agreement in 2000 between the ruling party and the opposition.

Djibouti is a multi-ethnic nation with a population of 1,066,809 at the census held on 20 May 2024 (the smallest in mainland Africa). French and Arabic are its two official languages; Afar and Somali are national languages. About 94% of Djiboutians adhere to Islam, which is the official religion and has been predominant in the region for more than 1,000 years. The Somalis and Afar make up the two largest ethnic groups, with the former comprising the majority of the population. Both speak a language of the Cushitic branch of the Afroasiatic languages.

Djibouti is near some of the world's busiest shipping lanes, controlling access to the Red Sea and Indian Ocean. It serves as a key refuelling and transshipment center and the principal maritime port for imports from and exports to neighboring Ethiopia. The nation is the site of various foreign military bases. The Intergovernmental Authority on Development (IGAD) regional body also has its headquarters in Djibouti City.

== Name and etymology ==
Djibouti is officially known as the Republic of Djibouti. In local languages it is known as Gabuuti (in Afar) and Jabuuti (in Somali).

The country is named for its capital, the City of Djibouti. The etymology of the name is disputed. There are several theories and legends about its origin, varying based on ethnicity. One theory derives it from the Afar word gabouti, meaning "plate", possibly referring to the area's geographical features. Another connects it to gabood, meaning "upland/plateau". Djibouti could also mean "Land of Tehuti" or "Land of Thoth (Egyptian: Djehuti/ Djehuty)", after the Egyptian moon god.

Under French administration, from 1862 until 1894, the land to the north of the Gulf of Tadjoura was called "Obock". From 1897 to 1967 the area was known as French Somaliland (French: Côte française des Somalis), and from 1967 to 1977 as the French Territory of the Afars and the Issas (French: Territoire français des Afars et des Issas).

== History ==
=== Prehistory ===
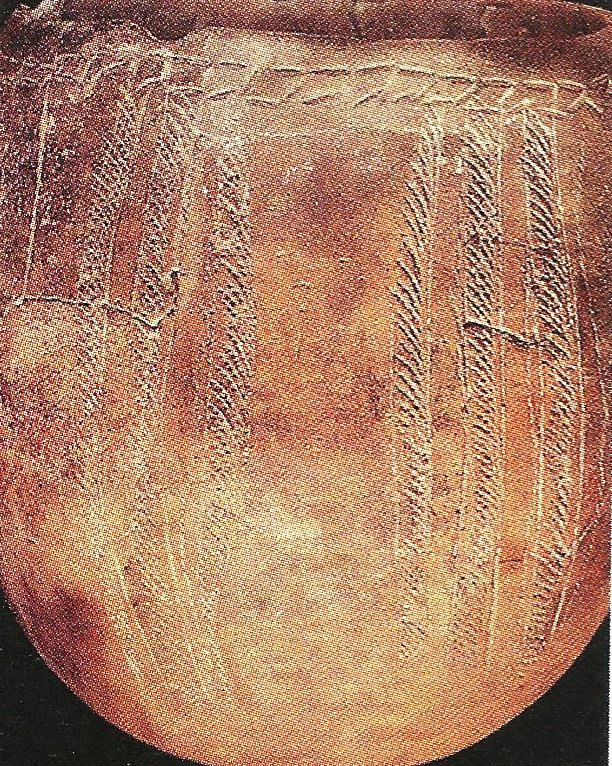
Geometric design pottery found in Asa Koma

The Bab-el-Mandeb region has often been considered a primary crossing point for early hominins following a southern coastal route from East Africa to South and Southeast Asia.

The Djibouti area has been inhabited since the Neolithic. According to linguists, the first Afroasiatic-speaking populations arrived in the region during this period from the family's proposed urheimat ("original homeland") in the Nile Valley, or the Near East. Other scholars propose that the Afroasiatic family developed in situ in the Horn, with its speakers subsequently dispersing from there.

Cut stones dated about 3 million years old have been collected in the area of Lake Abbe. In the Gobaad plain (between Dikhil and Lake Abbe), the remains of the extinct elephant Palaeoloxodon recki were also discovered, visibly butchered using basalt tools found nearby. These remains would date from 1.4 million years BCE. Subsequently, other similar sites were identified as probably the work of Homo ergaster. An Acheulean site (from 800,000 to 400,000 years BCE), where stone was cut, was excavated in the 1990s, in Gombourta, between Damerdjog and Loyada, 15 km south of Djibouti City. Finally, in Gobaad, a Homo erectus jaw was found, dating from 100,000 BCE. On Devil's Island, tools dating back 6,000 years have been found, which were used to open shells. In the area at the bottom of Goubet (Dankalélo, not far from Devil's Island), circular stone structures and fragments of painted pottery have also been discovered. Previous investigators have also reported a fragmentary maxilla, attributed to an older form of Homo sapiens and dated to c. 250 Ka, from the valley of the Dagadlé Wadi.

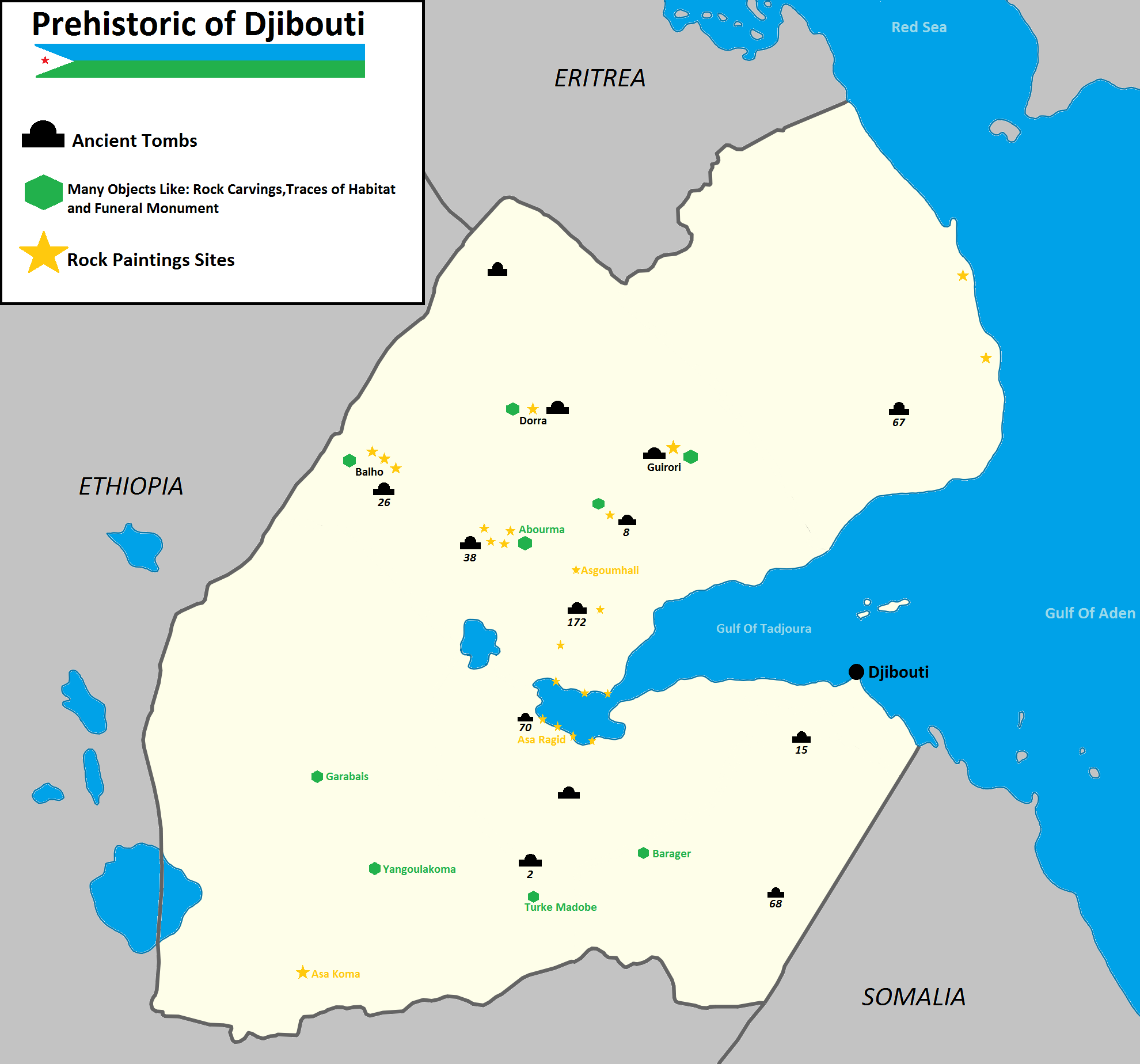
Prehistoric rock art and tombs in Djibouti

Pottery predating the mid-2nd millennium has been found at Asa Koma, an inland lake area on the Gobaad Plain. The site's ware is characterized by punctate and incision geometric designs, which bear a similarity to the Sabir culture phase 1 ceramics from Ma'layba in Southern Arabia. Long-horned humpless cattle bones have likewise been discovered at Asa Koma, suggesting that domesticated cattle were present by around 3,500 years ago. Rock art of what appear to be antelopes and a giraffe are also found at Dorra and Balho. Handoga, dated to the fourth millennium BCE, has in turn yielded obsidian microliths and plain ceramics used by early nomadic pastoralists with domesticated cattle.

The site of Wakrita is a small Neolithic establishment located on a wadi in the tectonic depression of Goba'ad in Djibouti in the Horn of Africa. The 2004 excavations yielded abundant ceramics that enabled us to define one Neolithic cultural facies of this region, which was also identified at the nearby site of Asa Koma. The faunal remains confirm the importance of fishing in Neolithic settlements close to Lake Abbé, but also the importance of bovine husbandry and, for the first time in this area, evidence for caprine herding practices. Radiocarbon dating places this occupation at the beginning of the 2nd millennium BCE, similar in range to Asa Koma. These two sites represent the oldest evidence of herding in the region, and they provide a better understanding of the development of Neolithic societies in this region.

Up to 4000 years BCE, the region benefited from a climate very different from the one it knows today and probably close to the Mediterranean climate. The water resources were numerous with lakes in Goba'ad, lakes Assal and Abbé larger and resembling real bodies of water. The humans therefore lived by gathering, fishing and hunting. The region was populated by a very rich fauna: felines, buffaloes, elephants, rhinos, etc., as evidenced, for example, by the bestiary of cave paintings at Balho. In the 3rd and 2nd millennia BCE, few nomads settled around the lakes and practiced fishing and cattle breeding. The burial of an 18-year-old woman, dating from this period, as well as the bones of hunted animals, bone tools and small jewels have been unearthed. By about 1500 BCE, the climate was already beginning to change, with sources of fresh water becoming more scarce. Engravings show dromedaries (animal of arid zones), some of which are ridden by armed warriors. The sedentary people now returned to a nomadic life. Stone tumuli of various shapes and sheltering graves dating from this period have been unearthed all over the territory.

=== Antiquity ===
The earliest recorded ancient Egyptian expedition to Punt was organized by Sahure of the Fifth Dynasty (25th century BC), returning with cargoes of antyue and Puntites. However, gold from Punt is recorded as having been in Egypt as early as the time of Pharaoh Khufu of the Fourth Dynasty.

Subsequently, there were more expeditions to Punt in the Sixth, Eleventh, Twelfth and Eighteenth dynasties of Egypt. In the Twelfth Dynasty, trade with Punt was celebrated in popular literature in the Tale of the Shipwrecked Sailor.

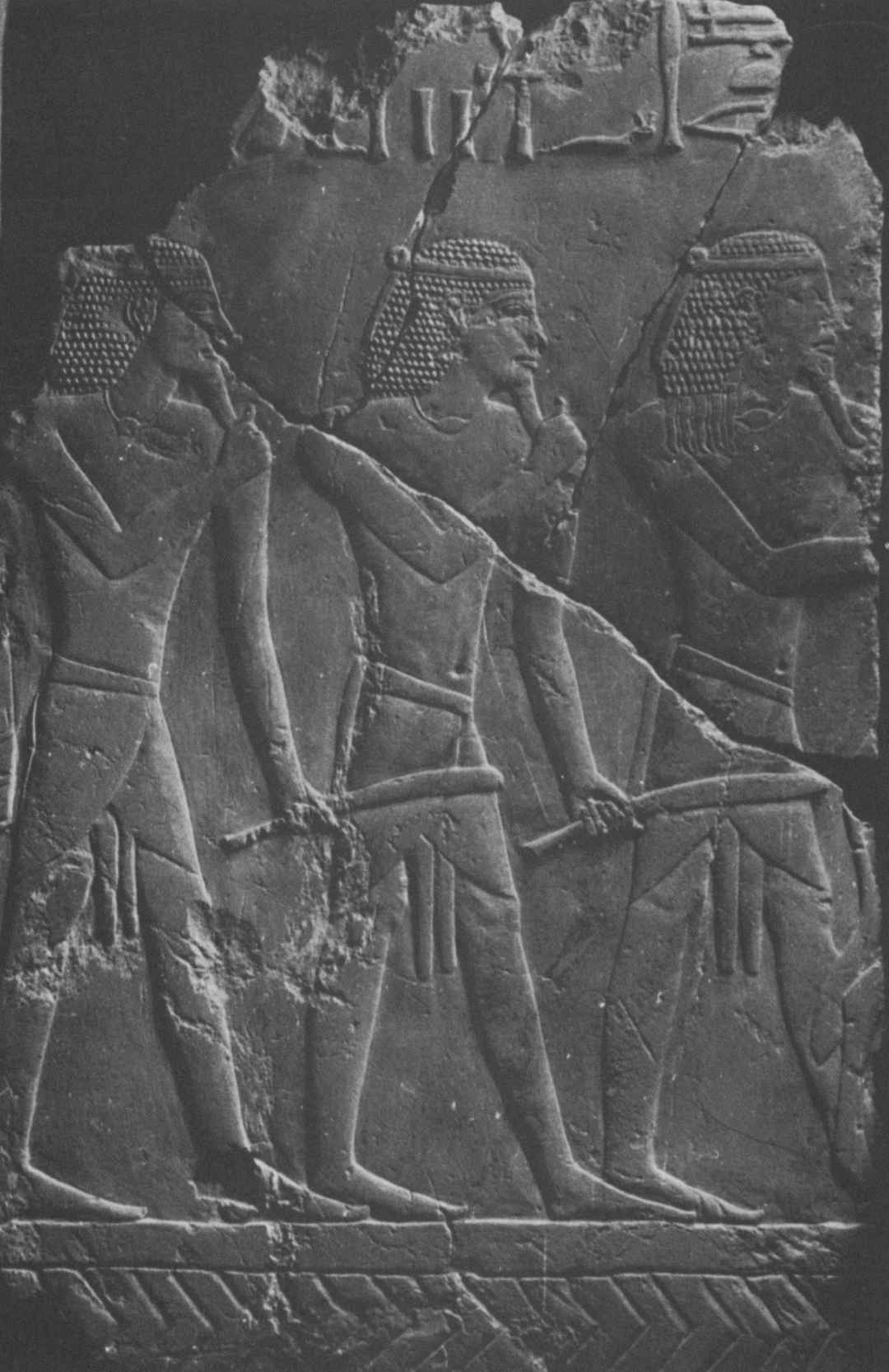
The Hatshepsut Punt Relief depicting three men in Puntite dress bearing gifts

In the reign of Mentuhotep III (11th dynasty, ca. 2000 BC), an officer named Hannu organized one or more voyages to Punt, but it is uncertain whether he personally traveled on these expeditions. Trading missions of the 12th dynasty pharaohs Senusret I, Amenemhat II and Amenemhat IV had also successfully navigated their way to and from the mysterious land of Punt. In the Eighteenth Dynasty of Egypt, Hatshepsut built a Red Sea fleet to facilitate trade between the head of the Gulf of Aqaba and points south as far as Punt to bring mortuary goods to Karnak in exchange for Nubian gold. Hatshepsut personally made the most famous ancient Egyptian expedition that sailed to Punt. Her artists revealing much about the royals, inhabitants, habitation and variety of trees on the island, revealing it as the "Land of the Gods, a region far to the east in the direction of the sunrise, blessed with products for religious purposes", where traders returned with gold, ivory, ebony, incense, aromatic resins, animal skins, live animals, eye-makeup cosmetics, fragrant woods, and cinnamon. During the reign of Queen Hatshepsut in the 15th century BC, ships regularly crossed the Red Sea in order to obtain bitumen, copper, carved amulets, naptha and other goods transported overland and down the Dead Sea to Elat at the head of the gulf of Aqaba where they were joined with frankincense and myrrh coming north both by sea and overland along trade routes through the mountains running north along the east coast of the Red Sea. Together with northern Ethiopia, Somaliland, Eritrea and the Red Sea coast of Sudan, Djibouti is considered the most likely location of the territory known to the Ancient Egyptians as Punt (or Ta Netjeru, meaning "God's Land"). The first mention of the Land of Punt dates to the 25th century BC. The Puntites were a nation of people who had close relations with Ancient Egypt during the reign of the 5th dynasty Pharaoh Sahure and the 18th dynasty Queen Hatshepsut. According to the temple murals at Deir el-Bahari, the Land of Punt was ruled at that time by King Parahu and Queen Ati.

=== Introduction of Islam and the Middle Ages ===
The Adal (also Awdal, Adl, or Adel) was centered around Zeila, its capital. It was established by the local Somali clans in the early 9th century. Zeila attracted merchants from around the world, contributing to the wealth of the city. Zeila is an ancient city and it was one of the earliest cities in the world to embrace Islam, shortly after the hijra. Masjid al-Qiblatayn dates to the 7th century, and is the oldest mosque. In the late 9th century, Al-Yaqubi, an Arab Muslim scholar and traveler, wrote that the Kingdom of Adal was a small wealthy kingdom and that Zeila served as the headquarters for the kingdom, which dated back to the beginning of the century.

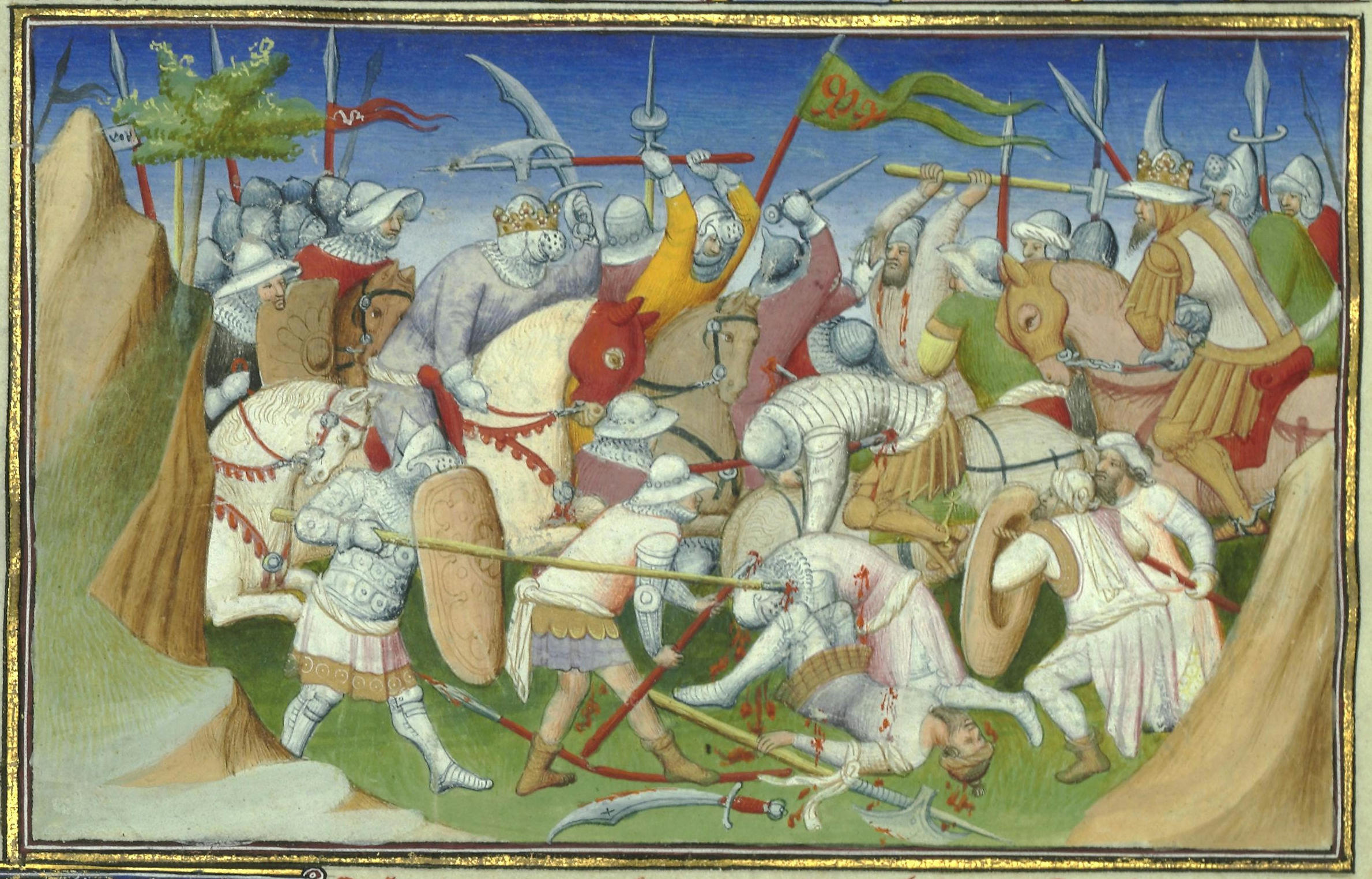
The Sultan of Adal (right) and his troops battling King Yagbea-Sion and his men depicted in Livre Des Merveilles

The earliest reference to Adal was following the collapse of the Makhzumi dynasty in July 1288 when 'Ali Baziyu led a campaign in Adal and Mora which was concluded by the killing of the lords of Adal and Mora, the victorious Sultan then annexed Adal and Mora to his Kingdom. Adal is also mentioned by Marco Polo in 1295 as a state continuously in conflict with Abyssinia. According to fourteenth century Arab historian Al Umari, Adal was one of the founding regions of the Ifat Sultanate alongside Biqulzar, Shewa, Kwelgora, Shimi, Jamme and Laboo.

It was used ambiguously in the medieval era to indicate the Muslim inhabitant low land portion east of the Ethiopian Empire. Including north of the Awash River towards Lake Abbe in modern Djibouti–Ethiopia border as well as the territory between Shewa and Zeila on the coast of Somalia. Districts within Adal included Hubat, Gidaya and Hargaya. It also occasionally included the Hadiya Sultanate. The region was mostly located in modern-day Awdal and had Zeila as a capital city but also controlled other interior towns like Abasa or Dakkar extending into the Harar plateau to the south-east and modern day Djibouti in the west.

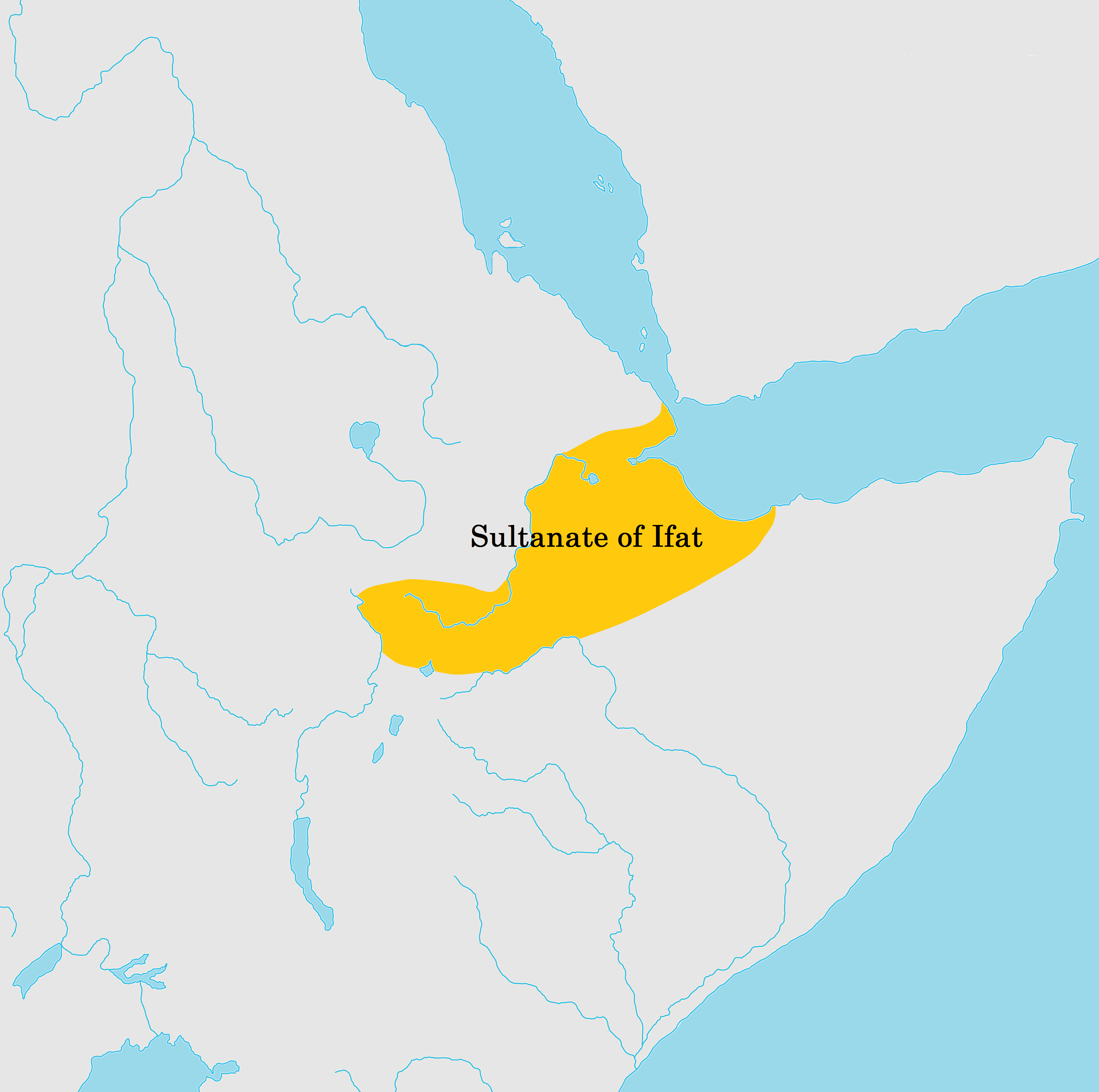
The Ifat Sultanate's realm in the 14th century

The Walashma dynasty are regarded by scholars as the founders of the Ifat Sultanate. Ifat first emerged when Umar Ibn Dunyā-ḥawaz, later to be known as Sultan Umar Walasma, carved out his own kingdom and conquered the Sultanate of Shewa located in northern Hararghe. In 1288 Sultan Wali Asma successfully imposed his rule on Hubat, Zeila and other Muslim states in the region. Taddesse Tamrat explains Sultan Walashma's military acts as an effort to consolidate the Muslim territories in the Horn of Africa in much the same way as Emperor Yekuno Amlak was attempting to consolidate the Christian territories in the highlands during the same period.

In 1320 a conflict between the Christian monarch and Muslim Ifat leaders began. The conflict was precipitated by Al-Nasir Muhammad of Egypt. The Mamluk ruler Al-Nasir Muhammad was persecuting Christian Copts and destroying Coptic churches. The Ethiopian Emperor Amda Seyon I sent an envoy with a warning to the Mamluk ruler that if he did not stop the persecution of Christians in Egypt, he would retaliate against Muslims under his rule and would starve the peoples of Egypt by diverting the course of the Nile. According to Pankhurst, of the two threats, the diversion of Nile was an idle threat and the Egyptian sultan dismissed it because he likely realized this to be so. The fear that the Ethiopians might tamper with the Nile, states Pankhurst, was nevertheless to remain with Egyptians for many centuries.

Sabr ad-Din's rebellion was not an attempt to achieve independence, but to become emperor of a Muslim Ethiopia. Amda Seyon's royal chronicle states that Sabr ad-Din proclaimed:

"I wish to be King of all Ethiopia; I will rule the Christians according to their law and I will destroy their churches...I will nominate governors in all the provinces of Ethiopia, as does the King of Zion (Ethiopia)...I will transform the churches into mosques. I will subjugate and convert the King of the Christians to my religion, I will make him a provincial governor, and if he refuses to be converted I will hand him over to one of the shepherds, called Warjeke [i.e. Warjih], that he may be made a keeper of camels. As for the Queen Jan Mangesha, his wife, I will employ her to grind corn. I will make my residence at Marade [i.e. Tegulet], the capital of his kingdom."

In fact, after his first incursion, Sabr ad-Din appointed governors for nearby and neighboring provinces such as Fatagar and Alamalé, as well as far-off provinces in the north like Damot, Amhara, Angot, Inderta, Begemder, and Gojjam. He also threatened to plant khat at the capital, a stimulant used by Muslims but forbidden to Ethiopian Orthodox Christians.

In 1376, Sultan Sa'ad ad-Din Abdul Muhammad, also called Sa'ad ad-Din II, succeeded his brother and came to power, who continued to attack the Abyssinian Christian army. He attacked regional chiefs such as at Zalan and Hadeya, who supported the Emperor. According to Mordechai Abir, Sa'ad ad-Din II raids against the Ethiopian empire were largely hit-and-run type, which hardened the resolve of the Christian ruler to end the Muslim rule in their east. In the early 15th century, the Ethiopian Emperor who was likely Dawit I collected a large army to respond. He branded the Muslims of the surrounding area "enemies of the Lord", and invaded Ifat. After much war, Ifat's troops were defeated in 1403 on the Harar plateau, Sultan Sa'ad ad-Din subsequently fled to Zeila where Ethiopian soldiers pursued him. Al-Maqrizi narrates:

the Amhara pursued Sa'd al-Din as far as the peninsula of Zeila, in the ocean, where he took refuge. The Amhara besieged him there, and deprived him of water; at last one of the impious showed them a way by which they could reach him. When they came upon him a battle ensued; and after three days the water failed. Sa'd al Din was wounded in the forehead and fell to the ground, whereupon they pierced him with their swords. But he died happily, falling in God's cause.

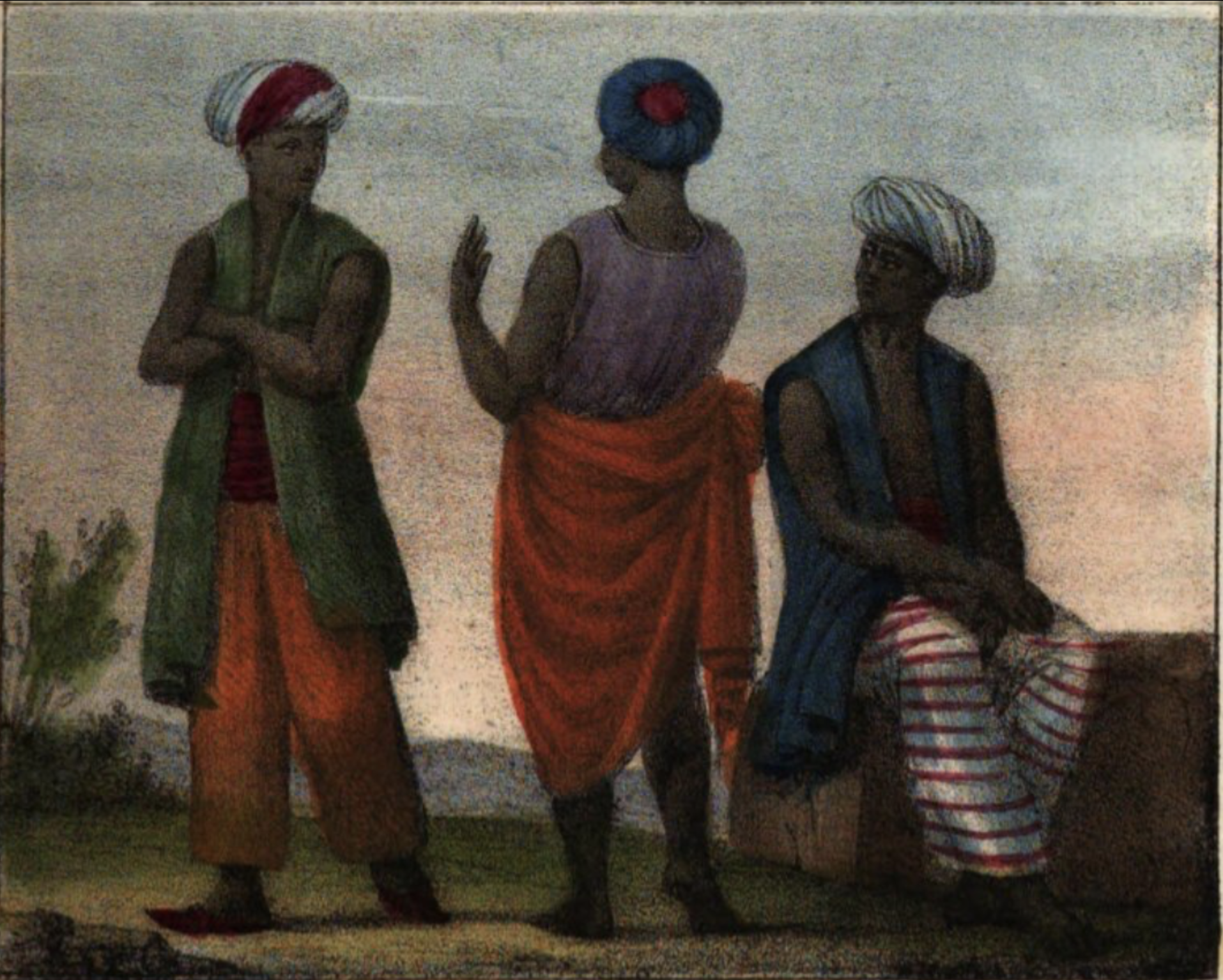
A depiction of Adal's traditional costumes by Giuseppe Antonelli

After Sa'ad ad-Din's death "the strength of the Muslims was abated", as Maqrizi states, and then the Amhara settled in the country "and from the ravaged mosques and they made churches". The followers of Islam were said to have been harassed for over twenty years. The sources disagree on which Ethiopian Emperor conducted this campaign. According to the medieval historian al-Makrizi, Emperor Dawit I in 1403 pursued the Sultan of Adal, Sa'ad ad-Din II, to Zeila, where he killed the Sultan and sacked the city of Zeila. However, another contemporary source dates the death of Sa'ad ad-Din II to 1410, and credits Emperor Yeshaq with the slaying. His children and the remainder of the Walashma dynasty would flee to Yemen where they would live in exile until 1415. Handoga initially was a marginal semi-permanent settlement in the 13th century, but it transformed into a permanent stone city in the 14th century, coinciding with Ifat's weakening and disrupted trade networks. The fall of Ifat, marked by military defeats, Ethiopian occupation, and the loss of Zeila, disrupted the key trade route linking the Indian Ocean to the interior, prompting the rise of peripheral centres like Handoga. Its growth was likely driven by trade route realignments and the reorganisation of regional commerce until stability was restored under the Adal Sultanate. It had acted as a trade hub in the region for several centuries before being utterly abandoned at the end of the 16th century.

In 1415, Sabr ad-Din III, the eldest son of Sa'ad ad-Din II, would return to Adal from his exile in Arabia to restore his father's throne. He would proclaim himself "king of Adal" after his return from Yemen to the Harar plateau and established his new capital at Dakkar. Sabr ad-Din III and his brothers would defeat an army of 20,000 men led by an unnamed commander hoping to restore the "lost Amhara rule". The victorious king then returned to his capital, but gave the order to his many followers to continue and extend the war against the Christians. The Emperor of Ethiopia Tewodros I was soon killed by the Adal Sultanate upon the return of Sa'ad ad-Din's heirs to the Horn of Africa. Sabr ad-Din III died a natural death and was succeeded by his brother Mansur ad-Din who invaded the capital and royal seat of the Solomonic Empire and drove Emperor Dawit I to Yedaya where according to al-Maqrizi, Sultan Mansur destroyed a Solomonic army and killed the Emperor. He then advanced to the mountains of Mokha, where he encountered a 30,000 strong Solomonic army. The Adalite soldiers surrounded their enemies and for two months besieged the trapped Solomonic soldiers until a truce was declared in Mansur's favour. During this period, Adal emerged as a centre of Muslim resistance against the expanding Christian Abyssinian kingdom. Adal would thereafter govern all of the territory formerly ruled by the Ifat Sultanate, as well as the land further east all the way from the Bab el Mandeb to Cape Guardafui, according to Leo Africanus. Adal is mentioned by name in the 14th century in the context of the battles between the Muslims of the Somali and Afar seaboard and the Abyssinian King Amda Seyon I's Christian troops. Adal originally had its capital in the port city of Zeila, situated in the western Awdal region. The polity at the time was an Emirate in the larger Ifat Sultanate ruled by the Walashma dynasty.

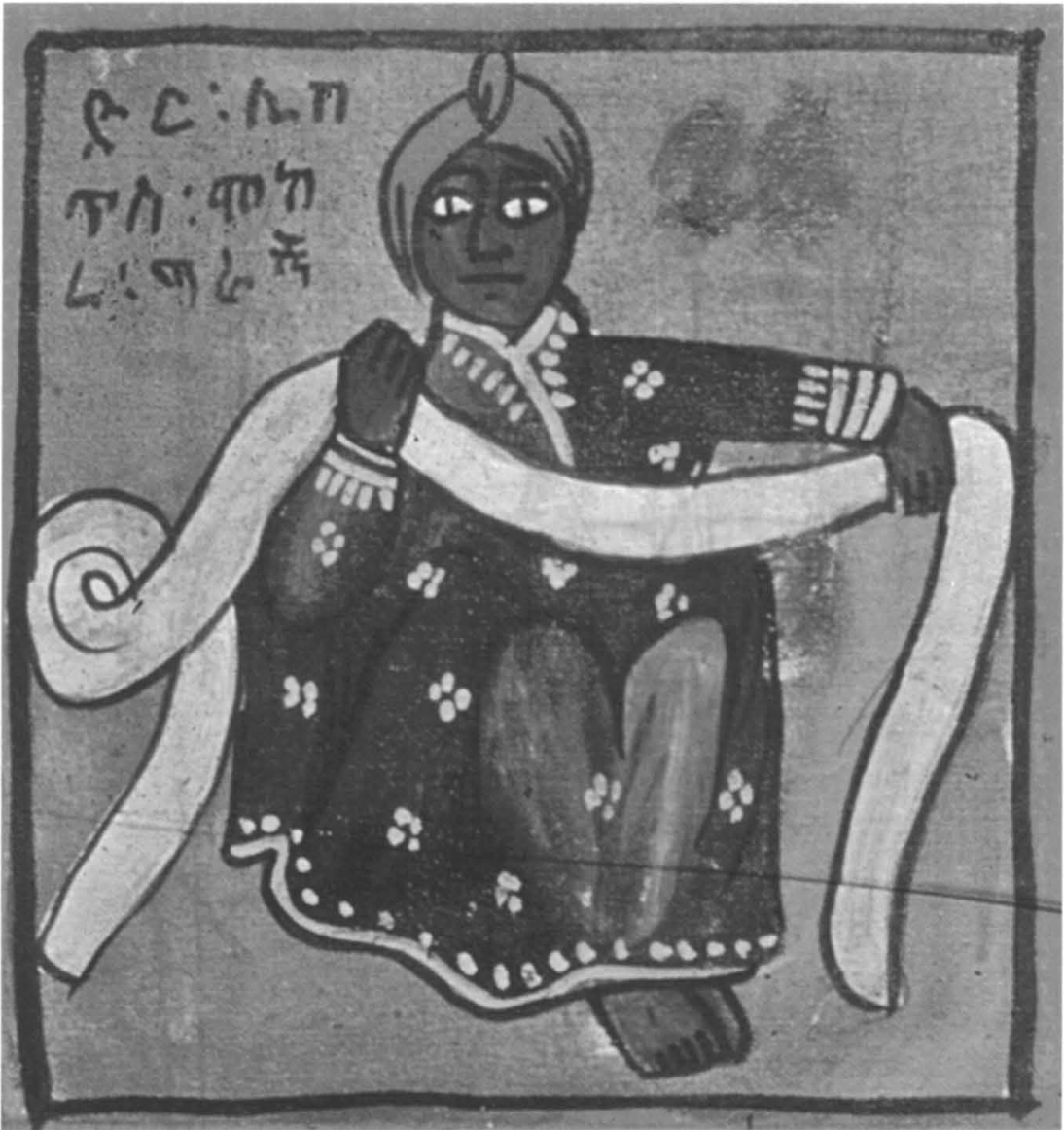
An illustration of the young Ahmad ibn Ibrahim demonstrating his strength

According to I.M. Lewis, the polity was governed by local dynasties consisting of Somalized Arabs or Arabized Somalis, who also ruled over the similarly established Sultanate of Mogadishu in the Benadir region to the south. Adal's history from this founding period forth would be characterized by a succession of battles with neighbouring Abyssinia. At its height, the Adal kingdom controlled large parts of modern-day Djibouti, Somaliland, Eritrea and Ethiopia. Between Djibouti City and Loyada are a number of anthropomorphic and phallic stelae. The structures are associated with graves of rectangular shape flanked by vertical slabs, as also found in Tiya, central Ethiopia. The Djibouti-Loyada stelae are of uncertain age, and some of them are adorned with a T-shaped symbol. Additionally, archaeological excavations at Tiya have yielded tombs. As of 1997, 118 stelae were reported in the area. Along with the stelae in the Hadiya Zone, the structures are identified by local residents as Yegragn Dingay or "Gran's stone", in reference to Imam Ahmad ibn Ibrahim al-Ghazi (Ahmad "Gurey" or "Gran"), ruler of the Adal Sultanate. Genasere was a major inland market town of Adal, supplied through the port of Zayla' with goods from across India. Located about 25 days from the coast and 40 days from Gendebelo, it was likely near Lake Abbé.

Ahmad ibn Ibrahim al-Ghazi was a military leader of the medieval Adal Sultanate in the northern Horn of Africa. Between 1529 and 1543, he embarked on a campaign referred to as the Futuh Al-Habash, bringing the three-quarters of Christian Abyssinia under the control of the Muslim empire. With an army composed of Afar, Harari (Harla), and Somalis, al-Ghazi's forces came close to extinguishing the ancient Ethiopian kingdom, slaughtering any Ethiopian who refused to convert to Islam. Within the span of fourteen years the Imam was able to conquer the heartland of the country, wreaking havoc on the Christian nation. The Bahri Negash joined Emperor Gelawdewos and the Portuguese in the decisive Battle of Wayna Daga, where tradition states that Imam Ahmad was shot in the chest by a Portuguese musketeer named João de Castilho, who had charged alone into the Muslim lines and died. The wounded Imam was then beheaded by an Ethiopian cavalry commander, Azmach Calite. Once the Imam's soldiers learned of his death, they fled the battlefield. This conflict provided an opportunity for the Oromo people to conquer and migrate into the historically Gafat land of Welega south of the Blue Nile and eastward to the walls of Harar, establishing new territories.

=== Early modern era ===
In 1550, Nur ibn Mujahid became the Emir of Harar and the de facto ruler of Adal, fortifying Harar by constructing a defensive wall still present today. In 1559, he led an invasion against the Ethiopian Empire, killing Emperor Gelawdewos at the Battle of Fatagar, while simultaneously repelling an Ethiopian assault on Harar, which resulted in the death of Sultan Barakat ibn Umar Din and the end of the Walashma dynasty. The Oromo then invaded Adal, and Nur's army suffered a defeat at the Battle of Hazalo, though the city's walls kept it safe, albeit under severe famine conditions. Nur died in 1567, and was succeeded by Uthman the Abyssinian, whose peace treaty with the Oromos led to his overthrow. His successor, Muhammad ibn Nasir, attempted an expedition against Ethiopia but was defeated and killed at the Battle of Webi River, marking the end of Adal's aggression. Muhammad's successor, Mansur ibn Muhammad, fought the Oromos unsuccessfully and later reconquered Aussa and Zeila. The death of Nur and the fall of the Walashma monarchs sparked power struggles, with Muhammad Gasa taking the title of Imam in 1576 and relocating the capital to Aussa, founding the Imamate of Aussa, which declined over the next century, eventually falling to the Afar people. In the seventeenth century, Harla people and Doba populations integrated into the Afar identity, leading to the emergence of the Sultanate of Aussa. Enrico Cerulli attributed Adal's downfall to its inability to overcome tribal divisions, unlike the Ethiopian Empire under Sarsa Dengel, resulting in ongoing struggles among the nomadic tribes. The collapse of the Adal Sultanate led to the formation of multiple rump states such as Aussa, Tadjourah and Rahayto.

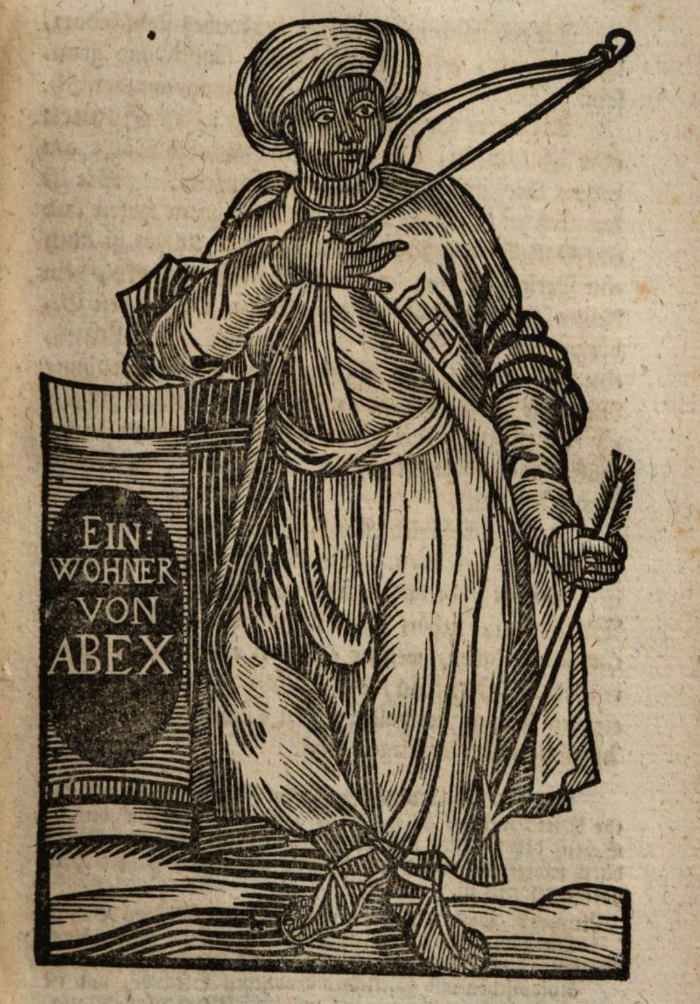
An inhabitant of the Habesh Eyalet by Georg Adam Dillinger (1773)

The Oromo invasion in the sixteenth century caused the most severe social and economic disruption to the Muslim state, dominating traditional Muslim territories from Berbera to Aussa and displacing communities. With Islamic centers destroyed and scholars gone, Islam became largely nominal. In the absence of formal legal authorities, Xeer customary law emerged or reemerged, drawing heavily from Sharia and developing further after the Oromo were defeated. The Xeer helped unite scattered groups to form the Issa tribal confederation. Originating in the 16th century, the Xeer functioned as a foundational legal system that brought diverse groups together under shared laws. It helped introduce principles central to modern political institutions long. The primary lineages of the Issa clan were divided into two main groups: the "three Issa" (saddehda Issa), which consisted of the lineal descendants of Shaykh Issa's three sons Ēlēye (also known as Abgal), ʿAli (also known as Walāldōn and Holleqade), and Hōlle (also known as Fūrlabe), and the "three followers" (saddehda so'rā). Issa's three sons and their descendants were collectively known as Bah Madigan. The "three followers" consisted of the Hōrrōne, Ūrweyne, and Wardiq, whose ancestors were said to be of extraneous origin and not descended from Issa's sons. According to some traditions, the Wardiq were of Sheekash origin, the Hōrrōne of Ishaq origin, and the Ūrweyne were said to have descended from the Afar. The account of ʿAli Kalageeye, a Somali warrior who freed the Issa clan from Oromo domination, is preserved in oral tradition, which recounts how he came from the east and managed to defeat the Oromo monarch Aale Boore. It is said that the site of these clashes was Adigala, a small town located today along the Djibouti–Ethiopian railway between Dire Dawa and Djibouti. In the early 18th century, the Mudaito-led sultanate of Awsa thrived as a mercantile center due to strong rulers, agriculture, and its strategic location. However, by the late 18th century, economic stagnation and political instability led to its decline. In the early 19th century, the Adoimara Afar clan invaded and forced revenue sharing. Meanwhile, Oromo expansion into Dankali lands deepened the north–south division where the region fragmented into small coastal sultanates, the most significant being Tadjoura, which dominated salt trade from Lake Assal.

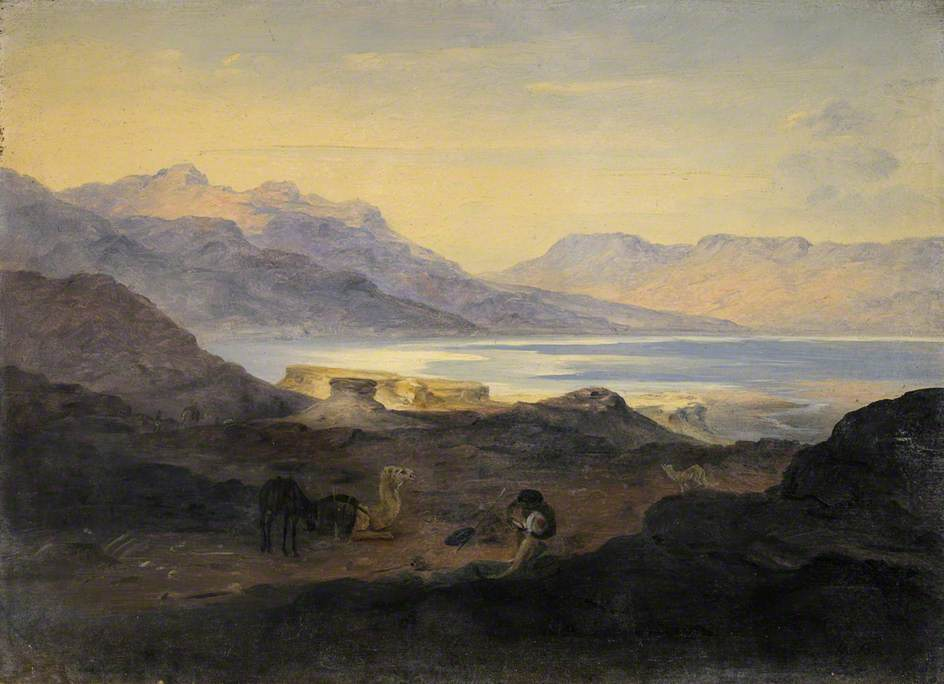
Drawing landscape of Lake Assal in 1841 by Johann Martin Bernatz.

Mamluk Egypt being conquered by the Ottomans alarmed the Arabian merchants, who were afraid of these new Turkish conquerors hence they chose to travel towards Adal's shores. This was also followed by Indian merchants fleeing from the same enemy. The Ottomans noticing this sudden mass movement, hastidly occupied Zeyla and established a customs house and galleys patrolling the Bab-el-Mandeb. By the 17th century, when the Ottomans were compelled to retire from Zeyla, the town and its environs such as Tadjoura fell under the control of the rulers of Mocha and Sana'a, who had leased the territory to a Sana'a merchant called Sayyid Al-Barr. Zeyla was subsequently ruled by an Emir, whom Mordechai Abir suggested had "some vague claim to authority over all of the Sahil, but whose real authority did not extend very far beyond the walls of the town." Assisted by cannons and a few mercenaries armed with matchlocks, the governor succeeded in fending off incursions by both the disunited nomads of the interior, who had penetrated the area, as well as brigands in the Gulf of Aden. Although Tadjoura claimed complete independence, it was considered subordinate to Zeyla as the sultan would received an annual stipend from the local governor. Abubakr Pasha explained to Vice-Admiral Alphonse Fleuriot de Langle that when the Imam of Sana'a still controlled the Yemeni coast, some soldiers sent to Tadjoura were one day massacred by the inhabitants of the city. The governor of Mocha then dispatched a new detachment to avenge them. Rather than suffer these reprisals, the city preferred to commit to paying the Imam, each year at the time of the fairs, a perpetual annuity which the governor of Zeyla would be responsible for extracting. Tadjourah's vizier Mahammed Mahammed renewed it for the benefit of the Turkish Pasha of Al-Hodeydah although the Ottoman Empire never exercised political right over Tadjoura. Mohammed Al-Barr would later be succeeded as governor of Zeila and its dependencies(Sahil) by Sharmake Ali Salih. In June 1861, the French accused Sharmarke Ali Salih of being involved in the murder of Henri Lambert, a former French consular agent and supporter of Sharmarke's rival, Abubakr Pasha, an Afar slave trader. Although the Turkish Pasha of Al-Hodeydah and the British Residency in Aden believed Sharmarke was innocent, he and some of his supporters were arrested and handed over to the French navy. The trial, originally planned for Constantinople, was later moved to Jeddah.

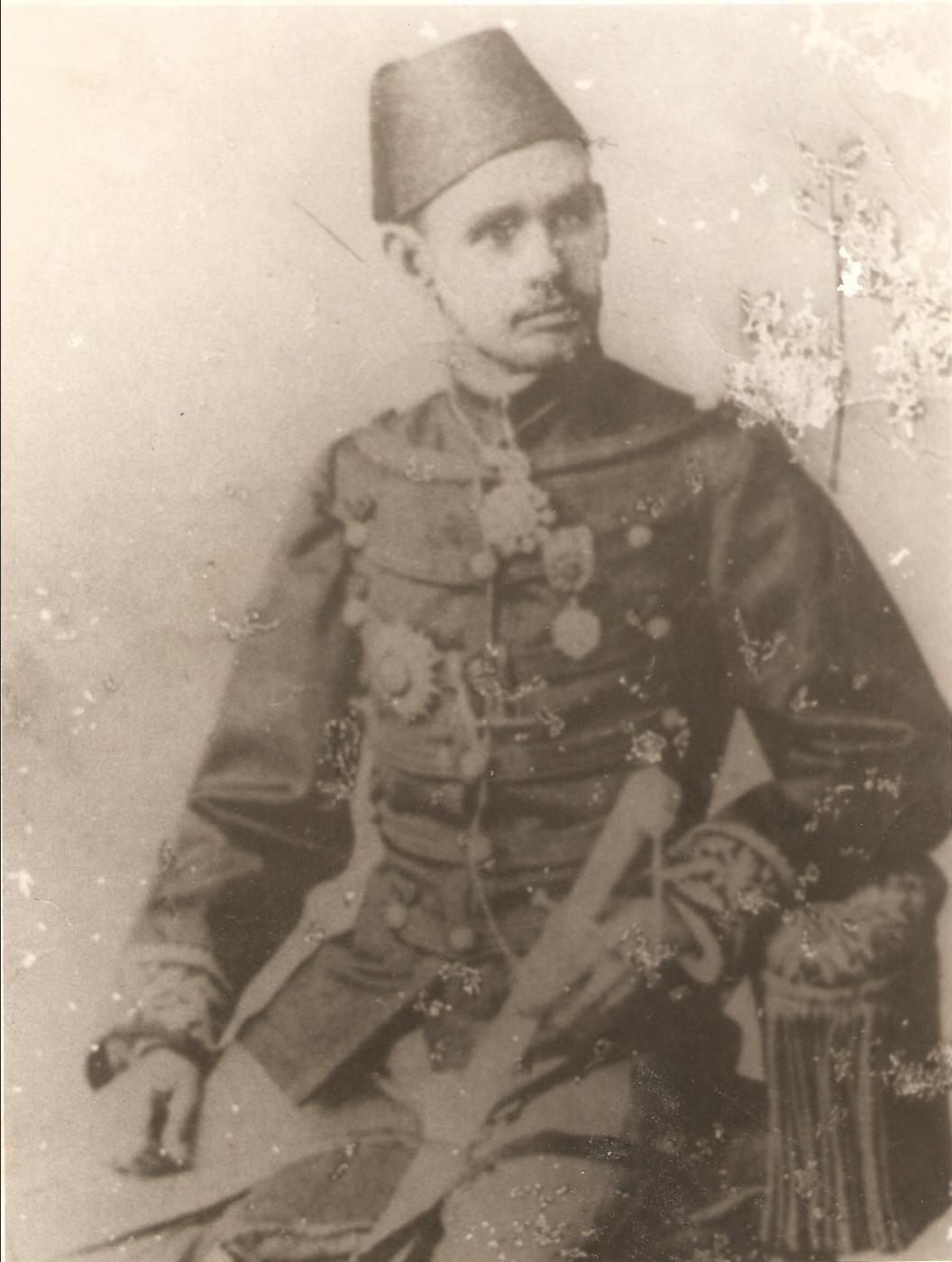
Portrait of Bourhan Bey (1855–1923), son of Aboubakr Ibrahim Chehem, who first served under Egypt before becoming a pioneer in the founding of Djibouti City.

During the period of Muhammad Ali's domination over the Hejaz and Yemen in the early 19th century, the port of Zeila also fell under the authority of Cairo, depending administratively on Mokha; its governor, named Mohammed El-Barr, kept command of it in exchange for an annual payment of 50 thalers, which he paid each year to Ibrahim Pasha, son of Muhammad Ali. Contemporary Egyptian officials, such as Jamali Bey, expressed anticipation for the reintegration of Zeilaʿ into Egypt and even proposed establishing an independent government there that would unite the villages, coastal regions, roads, and mountains stretching from Zeila to Massawa and up to the Ethiopian frontier under the authority of Khedive Ismaʿil. Abubakr, a key local intermediary, shifted his allegiance from the Ottomans to the Egyptians after failing to secure French support, became an influential figure in Egyptian policy. By the 1870s, he was acting as an indispensable go-between for correspondence between the khedive and regional rulers, including Menelik of Shewa, who relied on Abubakr's mediation while carefully avoiding provocation of Emperor Yohannes IV. On 12 February 1871, the Egyptian corvette Sa'ka anchored at Zeila with Mumtaz Pasha on board, who distributed subsidies on behalf of Cairo, raised the Egyptian flag in accordance with prior agreements, and extended Egyptian influence to Berbera and Tadjoura. Local rulers, such as the Afar chief Hummad, welcomed these overtures, requesting additional arms and supplies while signalling willingness to establish closer ties with Egypt. This period marked the beginning of a short-lived "honeymoon" between Egypt and the East African coast, though Cairo's ambitions faced diplomatic resistance from both Britain and the Ottoman Empire, particularly concerning the still-independent Somali ports of Berbera and Bulhar.

In the 1870s, Egyptian authorities portrayed their collaboration with prominent regional figures, including two influential slave traders Abubakr Pasha and Al-Zubayr Rahma Mansur, as part of their anti-slavery stance, despite the ongoing slave trade occurring openly. Abubakr, being governor of Zeila, was recognised more for his political influence than his role in the slave trade. After receiving the title of pasha from Cairo, he and al-Zubayr visited the city. In 1875, Zeila became Egypt's strategic base for the planned conquest of Harar. In August of that year, Muhammad Ra'uf Pasha arrived in Zeila with a firman from the khedive, instructing Abubakr to support a "geographic scientific voyage" to Harar which was a diplomatic facade intended to conceal military intentions from the British and maintain regional strategic balance. By the early 1870s, Egypt had been gaining power in the region and, in 1873, the Egyptians occupied Sagallo and other sites such as Tadjoura, but their hold didn't last long.

On October 16, 1884, Léonce Lagarde informed the commander of the cruiser Seignelay that the evacuation of Tadjourah and Sagallo by the Egyptians was imminent and advised immediate action. On October 18, as the Egyptians left Sagallo, the Seignelay's steam launch slipped ashore, allowing Legras to seize the site without resistance and install a garrison of 14 men. Over the following days, small posts were set up at Raïssali and Rood-Ali, though 35 Egyptian soldiers remained in Tadjourah. The Seignelay's commander proposed military intervention, believing resistance unlikely, but Lagarde hesitated at the last moment. On November 17, aboard the Brandon, Lagarde entered Tadjoura after the Egyptian withdrawal, raised the French flag, and departed without establishing a permanent post. The positions created in October were soon abandoned, leaving only a symbolic occupation maintained by occasionally hoisting the French flag and sending a ship from time to time.

=== French colonization (1862–1977) ===
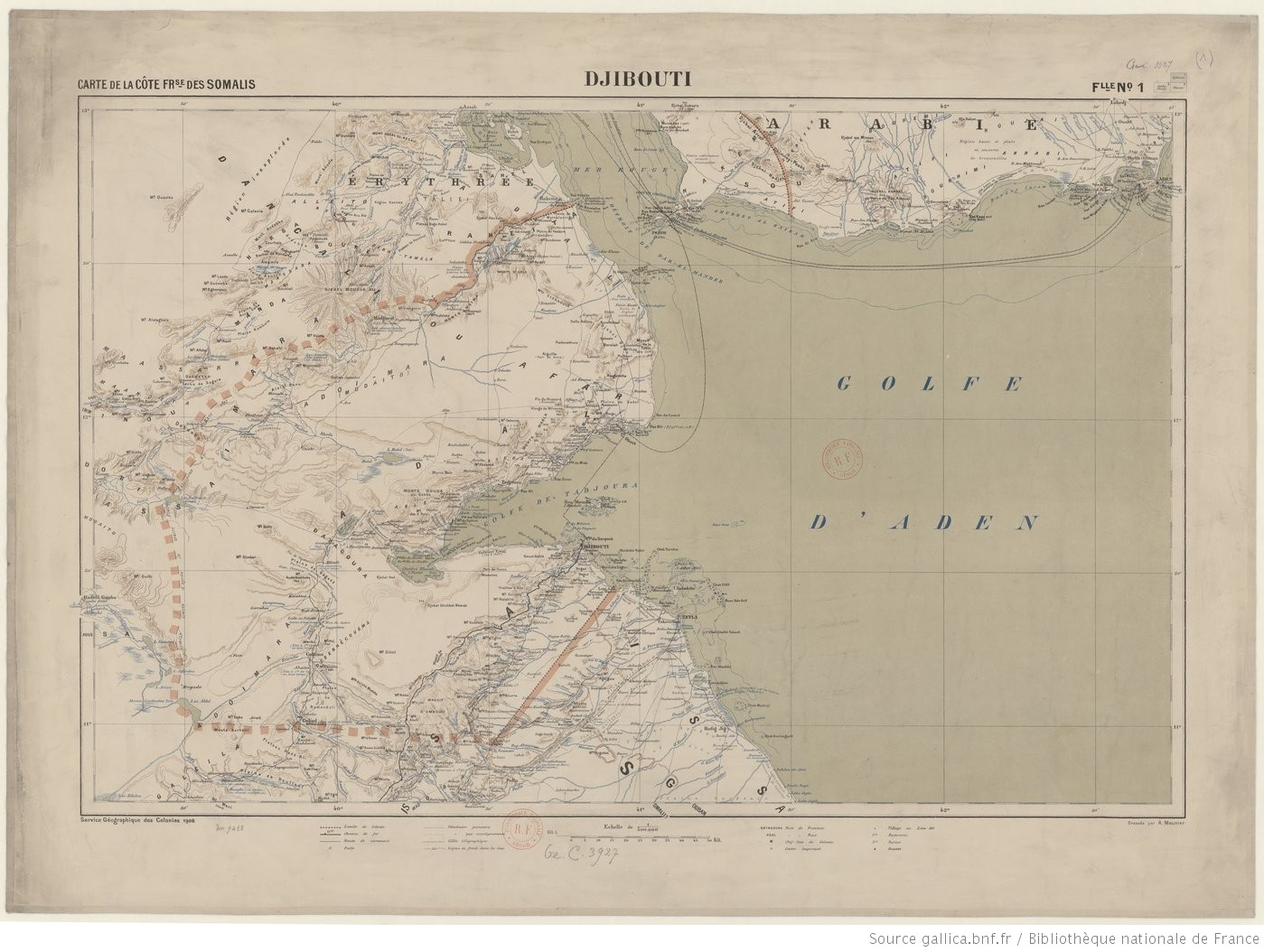
Map of the French Somali Coast and neighboring regions in 1870

The boundaries of the present-day Djibouti state were established as the first French establishment in the Horn of Africa during the Scramble for Africa. The March 11, 1862, agreement the Afar sultan, Raieta Dini Ahmet, signed in Paris was a treaty where the Afars sold lands surrounding in Obock. The French were interested in having a coaling station for steamships, which would become especially important upon the opening of the Suez Canal in 1869 (up to that time French ships had to buy coal at the British port of Aden across the gulf, an unwise circumstance to be in if war broke out). Later on, that treaty was used by the captain of the Fleuriot de Langle to colonize the south of the Gulf of Tadjoura. On March 26, 1885, the French signed another treaty with the Issas where the latter would become a protectorate under the French.

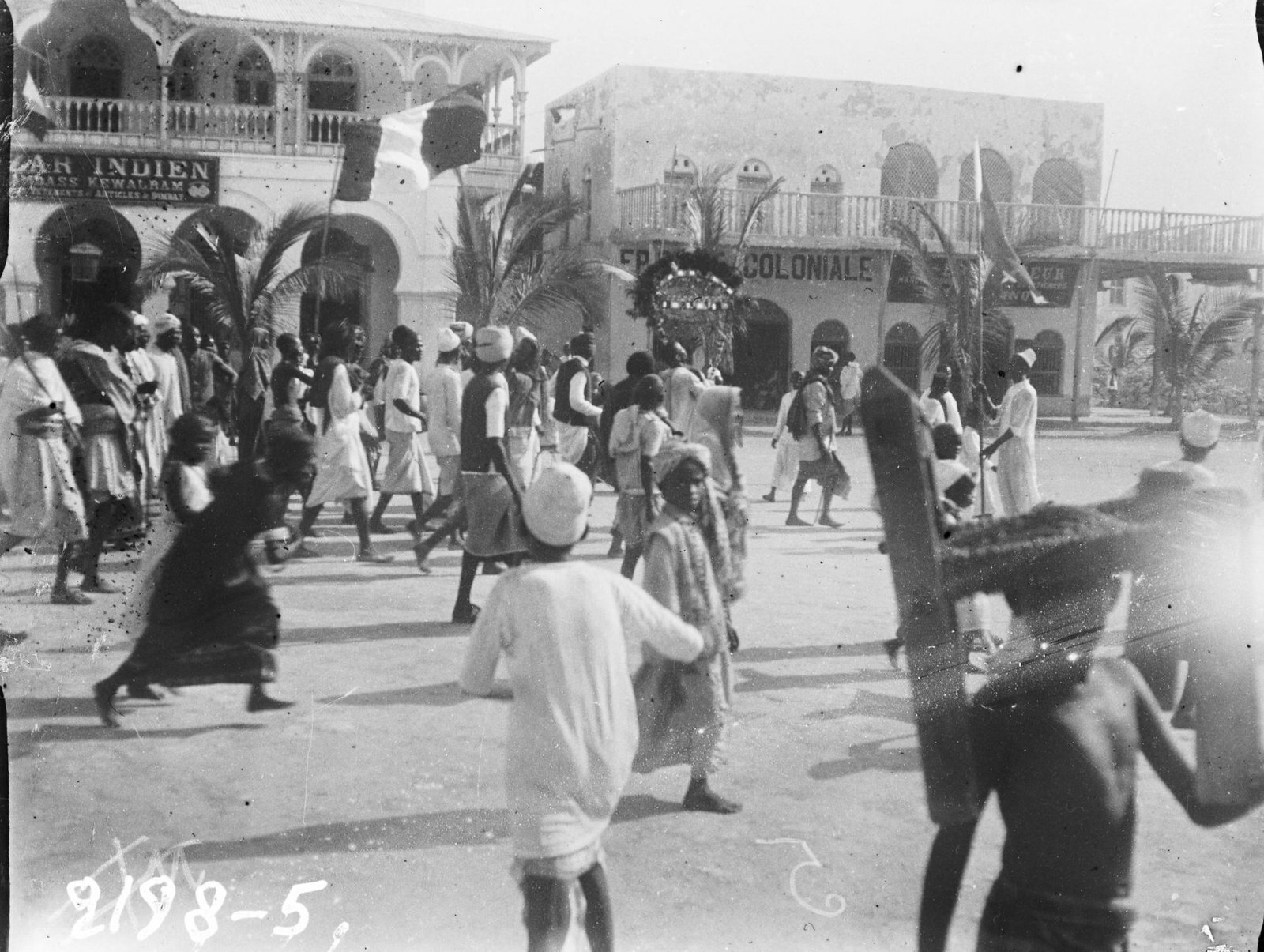
Solemn procession of local Muslims using Sudanese lyres to celebrate Eid in 1913

It was established between 1883 and 1887, after the ruling Somalis and Afar sultans each signed a treaty with the French. An attempt by Nikolay Ivanovitch Achinov, a Russian adventurer, to establish a settlement at Sagallo in 1889 was promptly thwarted by French forces after just one month. In 1894, Léonce Lagarde established a permanent French administration in the city of Djibouti and named the region French Somaliland. The construction of the Imperial Ethiopian Railway west into Ethiopia turned the port of Djibouti into a boomtown of 15,000 at a time when Harar was the only city in Ethiopia to exceed that.

Although the population fell after the completion of the railwayline to Dire Dawa and the original company failed and required a government bail-out, the rail link allowed the territory to quickly supersede the caravan-based trade carried on at Zeila (then in the British area of Somaliland) and become the premier port for coffee and other goods leaving southern Ethiopia and the Ogaden through Harar.

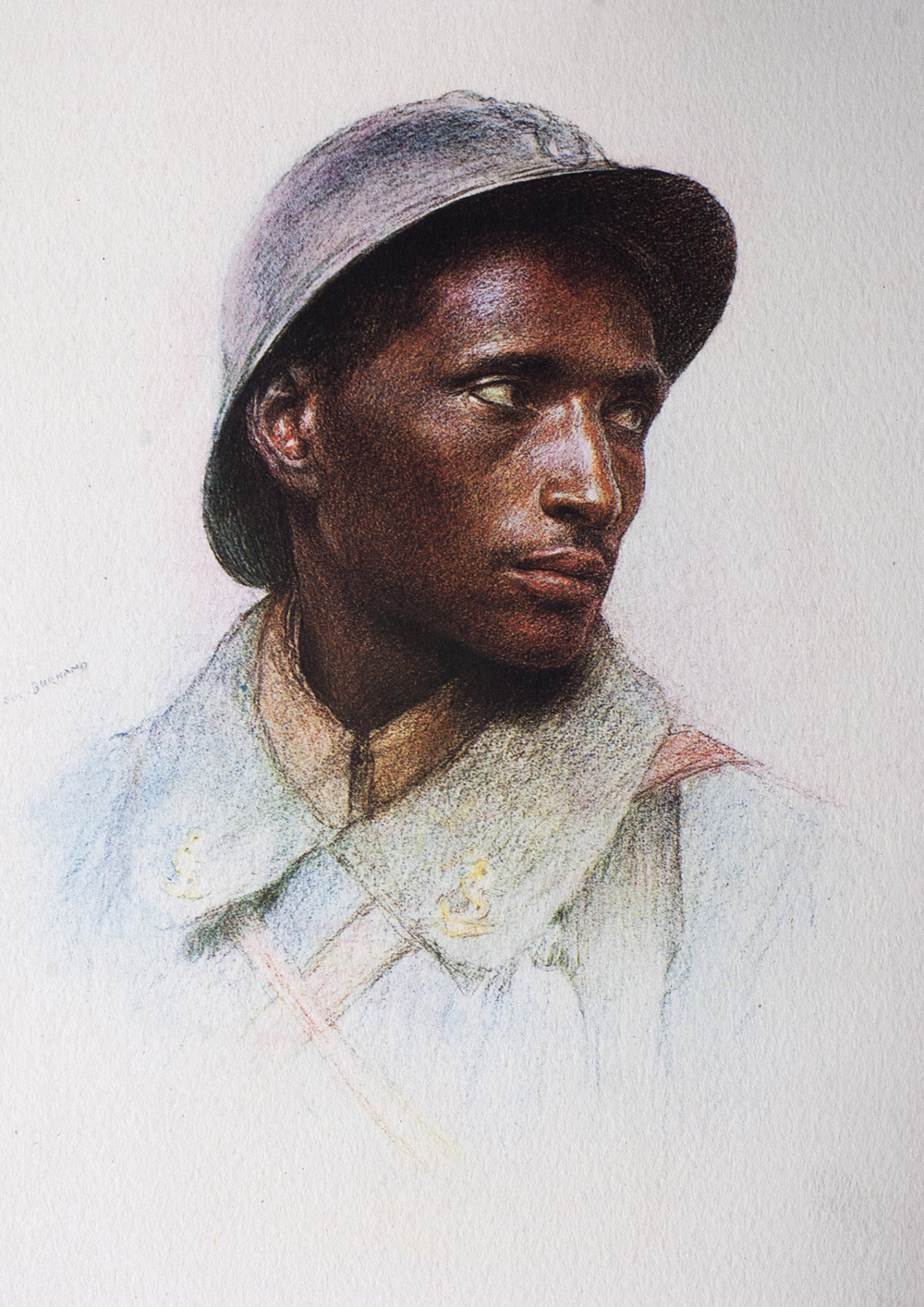
Ahmed Abokob, a Somali tirailleur from Djibouti, who participated in World War I

The 6th Somali Marching Battalion was formed in Madagascar on May 11, 1916, with recruits from the French Somali Coast and renamed the 1st Battalion of Somali Tirailleurs upon arrival in France in June. Originally intended as a staging unit, the battalion's officers responded to the Somalis' desire to fight, leading to their participation alongside the RICM in the October 1916 assault on Fort Douaumont. For their distinguished role, the battalion's companies were awarded the Croix de Guerre, and the RICM flag received the Legion of Honor. Reorganized as a combat unit by December 1916, the battalion fought at Chemin des Dames in May 1917 and later in significant battles such as Malmaison, the 3rd Battle of the Aisne, and the 2nd Battle of the Marne, earning multiple citations and the right to wear the Croix de Guerre fourragère. Of the 2,434 riflemen deployed, 517 were killed and 1,200 wounded in Europe.

After the Italian invasion and occupation of Ethiopia in the mid-1930s, constant border skirmishes occurred between French forces in French Somaliland and Italian forces in Italian East Africa. In June 1940, during the early stages of World War II, France fell and the colony was then ruled by the Vichy (French) government. British and Commonwealth forces fought the neighboring Italians during the East African Campaign. In 1941, the Italians were defeated and the Vichy forces in French Somaliland were isolated. The Vichy French administration continued to hold out in the colony for over a year after the Italian collapse. In response, the British blockaded the port of Djibouti City but it could not prevent local French from providing information on the passing ship convoys. In 1942, about 4,000 British troops occupied the city. A local battalion from French Somaliland participated in the Liberation of France in 1944.

In 1958, on the eve of neighboring Somalia's independence in 1960, a referendum was held in Djibouti to decide whether to remain with France or to be an independent country. The referendum turned out in favour of a continued association with France, partly due to a combined yes vote by the sizable Afar ethnic group and resident French. There were also allegations of widespread vote rigging. The majority of those who had voted no were Somalis who were strongly in favour of joining a united Somalia as had been proposed by Mahmoud Harbi, Vice President of the Government Council. Harbi was killed in a plane crash two years later under suspicious circumstances.

In 1966, France rejected the United Nations' recommendation that it should grant French Somaliland independence. In August of the same year, an official visit to the territory by then French president Charles de Gaulle, was also met with demonstrations and rioting. In response to the protests, de Gaulle ordered another referendum.

In 1967, a second plebiscite was held to determine the fate of the territory. Initial results supported a continued but looser relationship with France. Voting was also divided along ethnic lines, with the resident Somalis generally voting for independence, with the goal of eventual union with Somalia, and the Afars largely opting to remain associated with France. The referendum was again marred by reports of vote rigging on the part of the French authorities. Shortly after the plebiscite was held, the former Côte française des Somalis (French Somaliland) was renamed to Territoire français des Afars et des Issas. Announcement of the plebiscite results sparked civil unrest, including several deaths. France also increased its military force along the frontier.

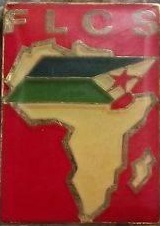
The Front de Libération de la Côte des Somalis (FLCS)

During the 1960s, the struggle for independence was led by the Front for the Liberation of the Somali Coast (FLCS), who waged an armed struggle for independence with much of its violence aimed at French personnel. FLCS used to initiate few mounting cross-border operations into French Somaliland from Somalia and Ethiopia to attacks on French targets. On March 24, 1975, the Front de Libération de la Côte des Somalis kidnapped the French ambassador to Somalia, Jean Guery, to be exchanged against two activists of FLCS members who were both serving life terms in mainland France. He was exchanged for the two FLCS members in Aden, South Yemen. The FLCS was recognized as a national liberation movement by the Organization of African Unity (OAU), which participated in its financing. The FLCS evolved its demands between the request of integration in a possible "Greater Somalia" influenced by the Somali government or the simple independence of the territory. In 1975 the African People's League for the Independence (LPAI) and FLCS met in Kampala, Uganda with several meeting later they finally opted for independence path, causing tensions with Somalia.

In 1976, members of the Front de Libération de la Côte des Somalis which sought Djibouti's independence from France, also clashed with the Gendarmerie Nationale Intervention Group over a bus hijacking en route to Loyada. This event, by showing the difficulties of maintaining the French colonial presence in Djibouti, was an important step in the independence of the territory. The likelihood of a third referendum appearing successful for the French had grown even dimmer. The prohibitive cost of maintaining the colony, France's last outpost on the continent, was another factor that compelled observers to doubt that the French would attempt to hold on to the territory.

=== Djibouti Republic ===
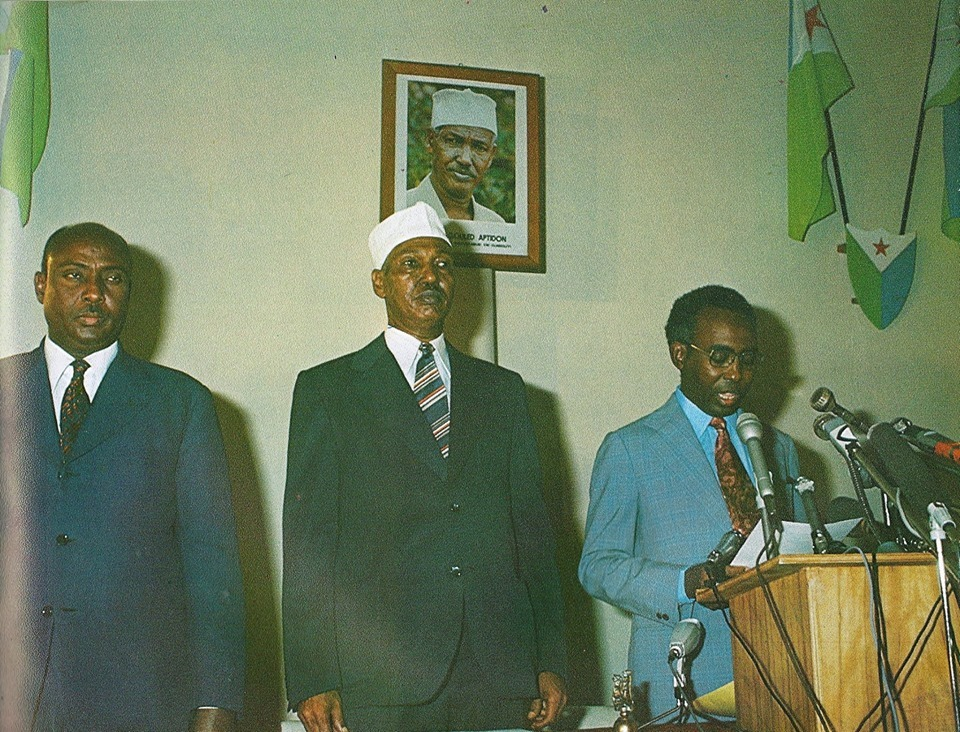
Ahmed Dini Ahmed proclaiming the Djibouti Declaration of Independence on 27 June 1977

A third independence referendum was held in the French Territory of the Afars and the Issas on 8 May 1977. The previous referendums were held in 1958 and 1967, which rejected independence. This referendum backed independence from France. A landslide 98.8% of the electorate supported disengagement from France, officially marking Djibouti's independence. Hassan Gouled Aptidon, an Issa (ethnic Somali) politician who had campaigned for a yes vote in the referendum of 1958, became the nation's first president (1977–1999).

During its first year, Djibouti joined the Organization of African Unity (now the African Union), the Arab League, and the United Nations. In 1986, the nascent republic was also among the founding members of the Intergovernmental Authority on Development regional development organization. During the Ogaden War, influential Issa politicians envisioned a Greater Djibouti or "Issa-land", where Djibouti's borders would extend from the Red Sea to Dire Dawa. That dream was dashed towards the end of the war as Somali forces were routed from Ethiopia.

In the early 1990s, tensions over government representation led to armed conflict between Djibouti's ruling People's Rally for Progress (PRP) party and the Front for the Restoration of Unity and Democracy (FRUD) opposition group. The impasse ended in a power-sharing agreement in 2000.

In April 2021, Ismael Guelleh, the second president of Djibouti since independence from France in 1977, was re-elected for his fifth term.

== Politics ==
Djibouti is a unitary presidential republic, with executive power resting in the presidency, which is by turn dominant over the cabinet, and legislative power in both the government and the National Assembly. The Economist Democracy Index rated Djibouti as authoritarian in 2024.

=== Governance ===
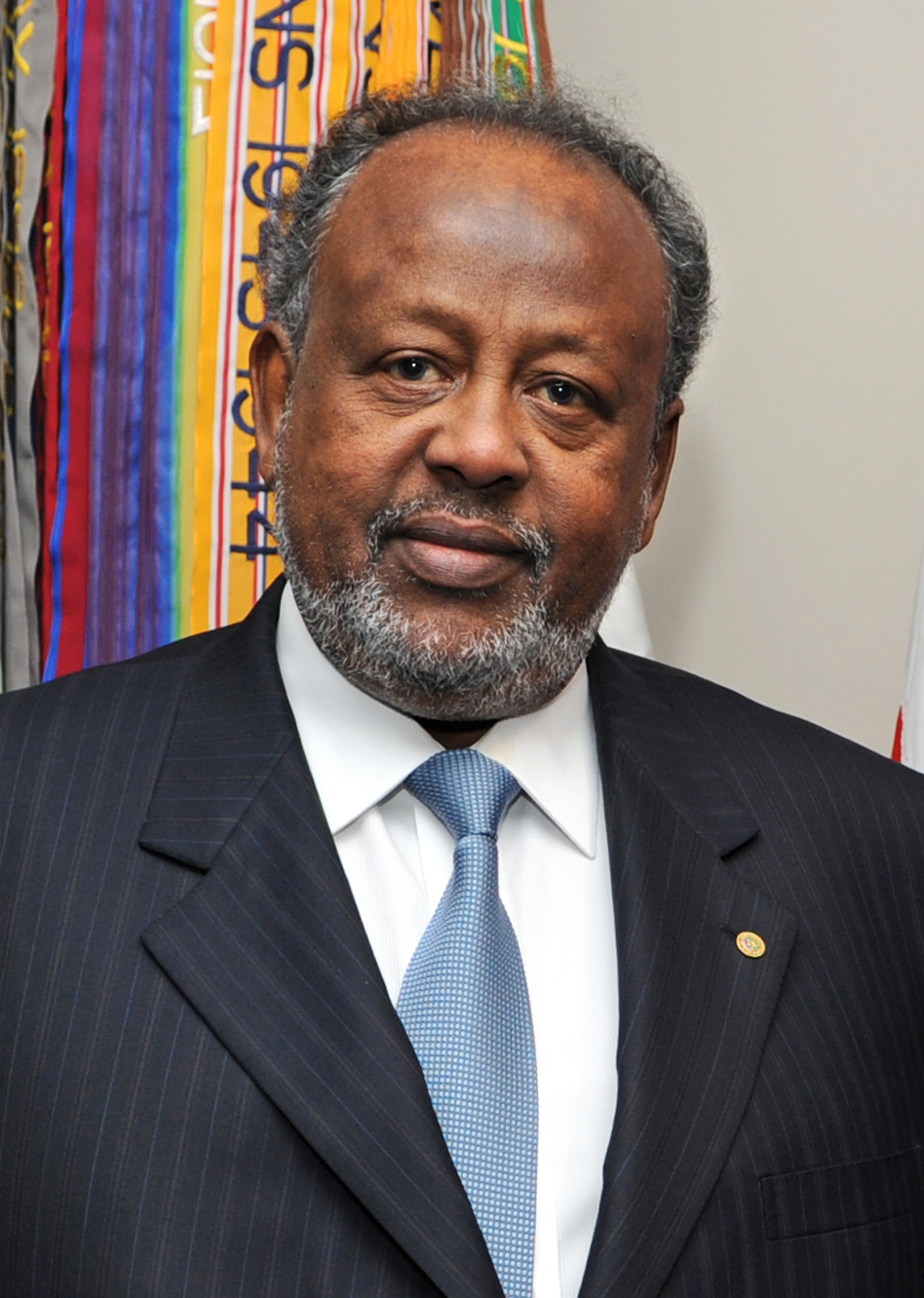
President of Djibouti, Ismaïl Omar Guelleh

The president, Ismaïl Omar Guelleh, is the prominent figure in Djiboutian politics—the head of state and commander-in-chief. The president exercises their executive power assisted by their appointee, the prime minister, currently Abdoulkader Kamil Mohamed. The Council of Ministers (cabinet) is responsible to and presided over by the president.

The judicial system consists of courts of first instance, a High Court of Appeal, and a Supreme Court. The legal system is a blend of French civil law and customary law (Xeer) of the Somali and Afar peoples.

The National Assembly (formerly the Chamber of Deputies) is the country's legislature, consisting of 65 members elected every five years. Although unicameral, the Constitution provides for the creation of a Senate. The last election was held on 23 February 2018. Djibouti has a dominant-party system, with the People's Rally for Progress (RPP) controlling the legislature and the executive since its foundation in 1979 (the party rules as a part of the Union for a Presidential Majority, which holds a supermajority of seats). Opposition parties are allowed (limited) freedom, but the main opposition party, the Union for National Salvation, boycotted the 2005 and 2008 elections, citing government control of the media and repression of the opposition candidates.

The government is dominated by the Somali Issa Dir clan, who have the support of the Somali clans, especially the Gadabuursi Dir clan. The country emerged from a decade-long civil war at the end of the 1990s with the government and the Front for the Restoration of Unity and Democracy (FRUD) signing a peace treaty in 2000. Two FRUD members joined the cabinet, and beginning with the presidential elections of 1999, the FRUD has campaigned in support of the RPP.

President Guelleh succeeded Hassan Gouled Aptidon in office in 1999. Guelleh was sworn in for his second six-year term after a one-man election on 8 April 2005. He took 100% of the votes in a 78.9% turnout. In early 2011, the Djiboutian citizenry took part in a series of protests against the long-serving government, which were associated with the larger Arab Spring demonstrations. Guelleh was reelected to a third term later that year with 80.63% of the vote in a 75% turnout. Although opposition groups boycotted the ballot over changes to the constitution permitting Guelleh to run again for office, international observers from the African Union generally described the election as free and fair.

On 31 March 2013, Guelleh replaced long-serving prime minister Dilleita Mohamed Dilleita with former president of the Union for a Presidential Majority (UMP) Abdoulkader Kamil Mohamed. In December 2014, the ruling Union for the Presidential Majority also signed a framework agreement with the Union of National Salvation coalition, which paves the way for opposition legislators to enter parliament and for reformation of the national electoral agency.

=== Foreign relations ===
The Djibouti National Assembly in Djibouti City

Foreign relations of Djibouti are managed by the Djiboutian Ministry of Foreign Affairs and International Cooperation. Djibouti maintains close ties with the governments of Somalia, Ethiopia, France and the United States. It is likewise an active participant in African Union, United Nations, Non-Aligned Movement, Organisation of Islamic Cooperation and Arab League affairs. Since the 2000s, Djiboutian authorities have also strengthened relations with Turkey.

Djibouti has been a member of the Forum of Small States (FOSS) since the group's founding in 1992.

=== Military ===
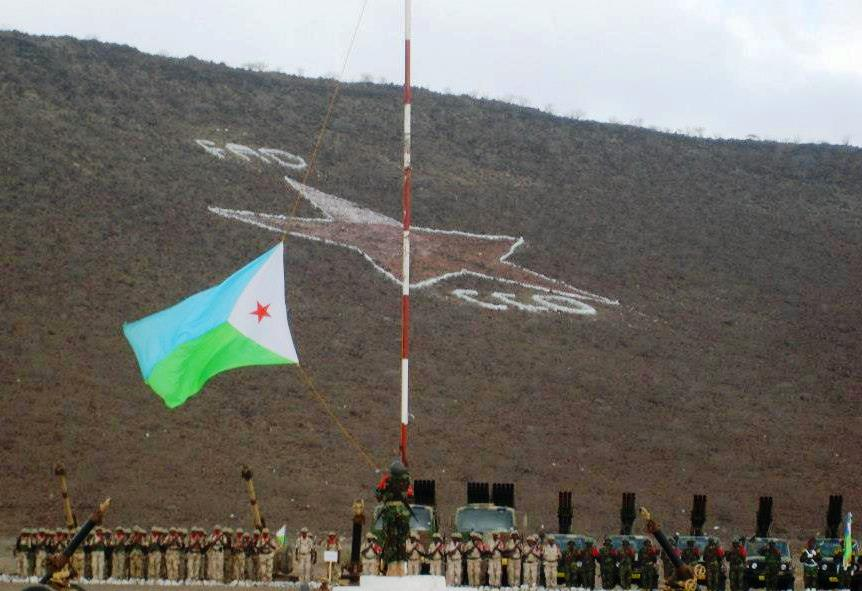
Maryama base during a martial exercise in the Arta Region

The Djiboutian Armed Forces include the Djiboutian Army, which consists of the Djiboutian Navy, the Djiboutian Air Force, and the National Gendarmerie (GN). As of 2011, the manpower available for military service was 170,386 males and 221,411 females aged 16 to 49. Djibouti spent over US$36 million annually on its military as of 2011 (141st in the SIPRI database). After independence, Djibouti had two regiments commanded by French officers. In the early 2000s, it looked outward for a model of army organization that would best advance defensive capabilities by restructuring forces into smaller, more mobile units instead of traditional divisions.

The first war to involve the Djiboutian Armed Forces was the Djiboutian Civil War between the Djiboutian government, supported by France, and the Front for the Restoration of Unity and Democracy (FRUD). The war lasted from 1991 to 2001, although most of the hostilities ended when the moderate factions of FRUD signed a peace treaty with the government after suffering an extensive military setback when the government forces captured most of the rebel-held territory. A radical group continued to fight the government, but signed its own peace treaty in 2001. The war ended in a government victory, and FRUD became a political party.

As the headquarters of the IGAD regional body, Djibouti has been an active participant in the Somali peace process, hosting the Arta conference in 2000. Following the establishment of the Federal Government of Somalia in 2012, a Djiboutian delegation attended the inauguration ceremony of Somalia's new president.

In recent years, Djibouti has improved its training techniques, military command and information structures and has taken steps to becoming more self-reliant in supplying its military to collaborate with the United Nations in peacekeeping missions, or to provide military help to countries that officially ask for it. Now deployed to Somalia and Sudan.

=== Foreign military presence ===
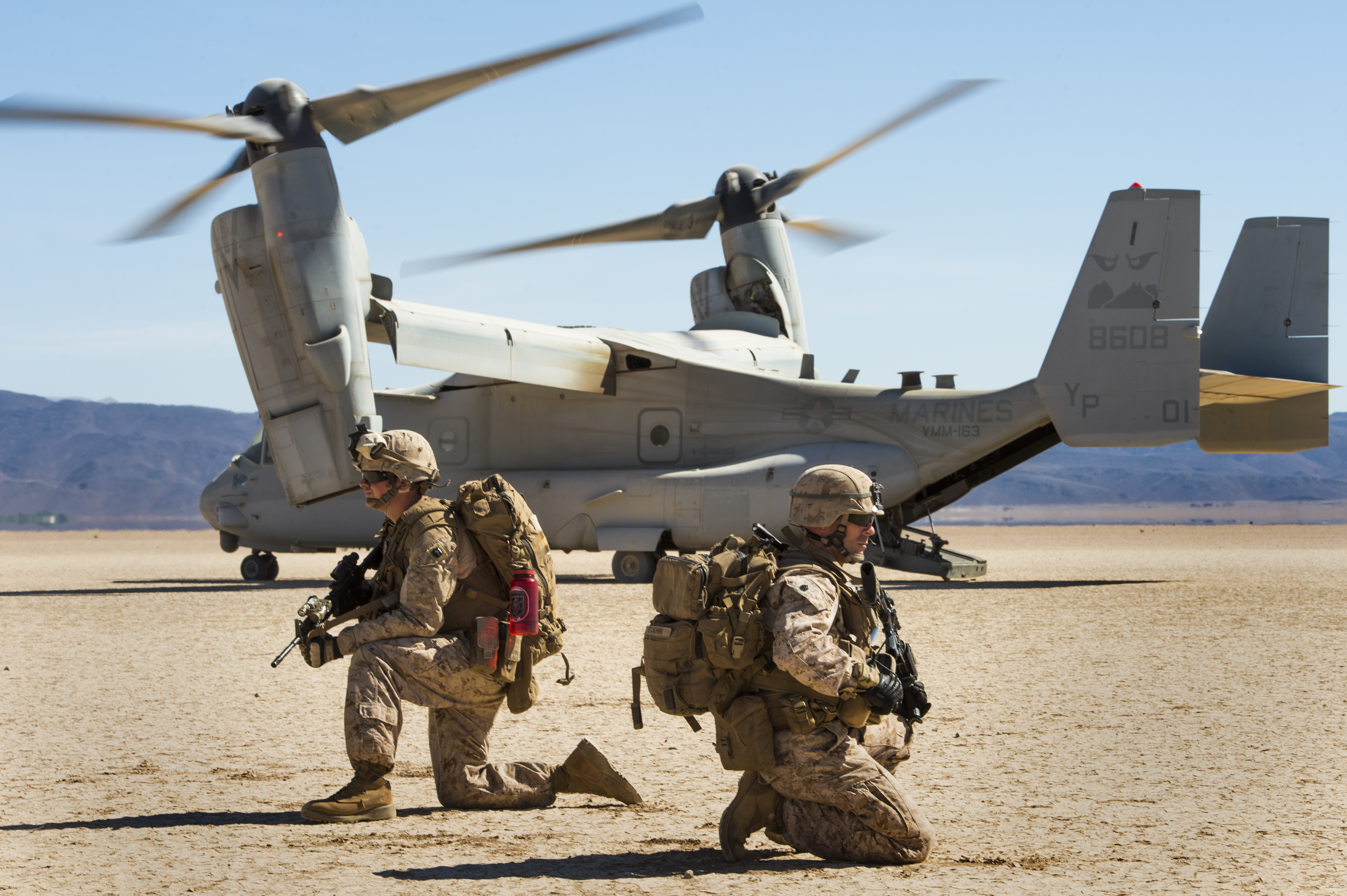
American service members in the Grand Bara desert, 2017

The French Forces remained present in Djibouti when the territory gained independence, first as part of a provisional protocol of June 1977 laying down the conditions for the stationing of French forces, constituting a defense agreement. A new defence cooperation treaty between France and Djibouti was signed in Paris on 21 December 2011. It entered into force on 1 May 2014. By that treaty and its security clause, France reaffirmed its commitment to the independence and territorial integrity of the Republic of Djibouti. As well before independence, in 1962, a French Foreign Legion unit, the 13th Demi-Brigade of the Foreign Legion (13 DBLE) was transferred from Algeria to Djibouti to form the core of the French garrison there. On 31 July 2011, the demi-brigade left Djibouti to the United Arab Emirates.

Djibouti's strategic location by the Bab-el-Mandeb Strait, which separates the Gulf of Aden from the Red Sea and controls the approaches to the Suez Canal, has made it a desirable location for foreign military bases. Camp Lemonnier was abandoned by the French and later leased to the United States Central Command in September 2002. The lease was renewed in 2014 for another 20 years. The Italian National Support Military Base is also located in Djibouti. The country also hosts the only overseas Japanese military base and Chinese support base.

The United States Department of Defense has accused the Chinese of targeting U.S. military aircraft with a high-powered laser near its Chinese military base in Djibouti.

The hosting of foreign military bases is an important part of Djibouti's economy. The United States pays $63 million a year to rent Camp Lemonnier, France and Japan each pay about $30 million a year respectively, and China pays $20 million a year. The lease payments added up to more than 5% of Djibouti's total GDP of US$2.3 billion in 2017.

=== Human rights ===
In its 2011 Freedom in the World report, Freedom House ranked Djibouti as "Not Free", a downgrading from its former status as "Partly Free".

According to the 2019 U.S. State Department Country Report on Human Rights Practices, Djibouti's significant human rights issues include unlawful or arbitrary killings by government agents; arbitrary detention by government agents; harsh and life-threatening prison conditions; arbitrary or unlawful interference with privacy; unjustified arrests or prosecutions of journalists; criminal libel; substantial interference with the rights of peaceful assembly and freedom of association; significant acts of corruption; and violence against women and girls with inadequate government action for prosecution and accountability, including female genital mutilation/cutting. It states also that impunity was a problem, with the government seldom taking steps to identify and punish officials who committed abuses, whether in the security services or elsewhere in the government.

=== Administrative divisions ===
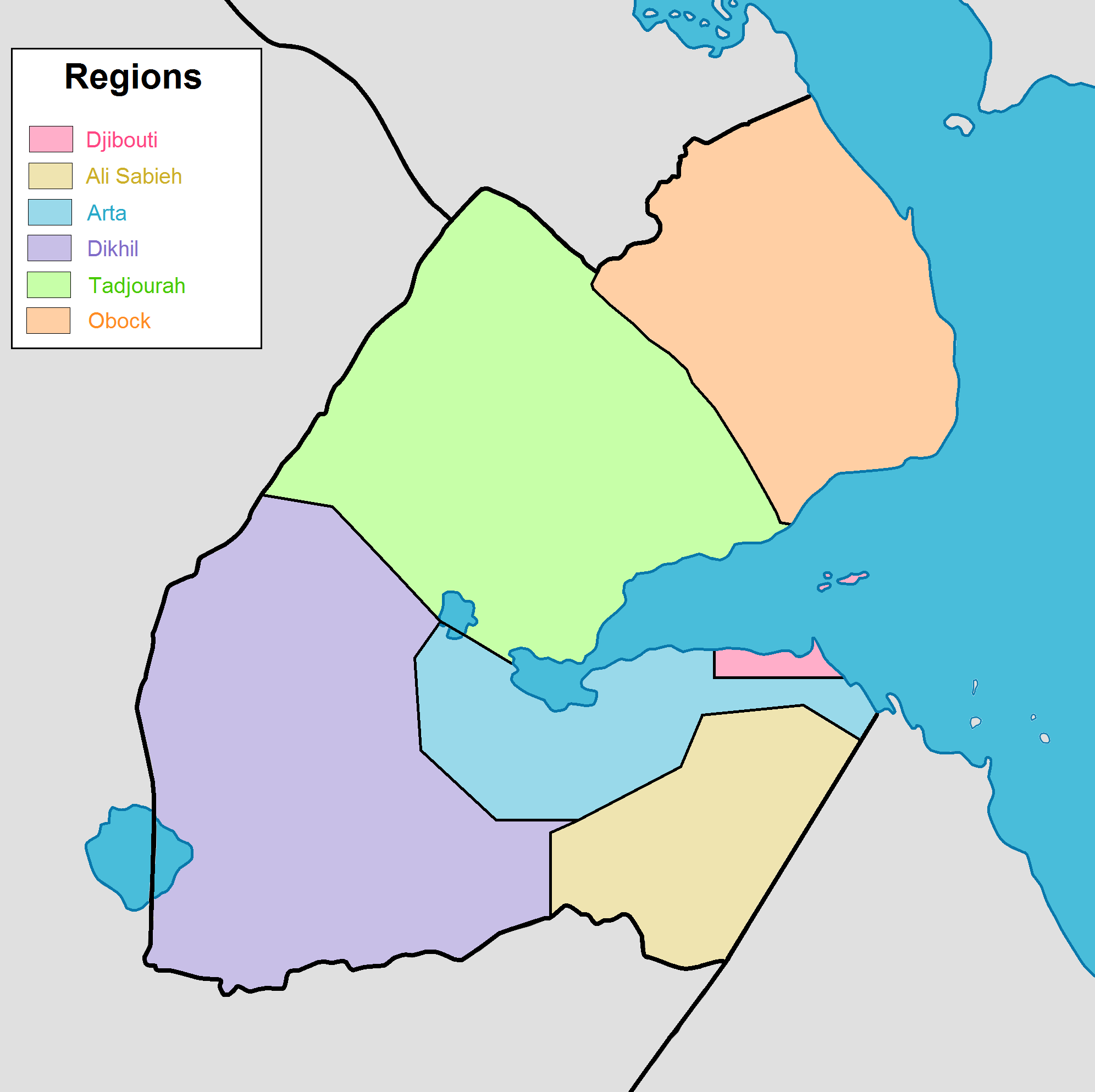
A map of Djibouti's regions

Djibouti is sub-divided into six administrative regions, with Djibouti city being one of the official regions. It is further subdivided into twenty sub-prefectures.

Regions of Djibouti
Region	Area (km^{2})	Population 2009 census	Population 2024 census	Capital
Ali Sabieh	2,200	86,949	76,414	Ali Sabieh
Arta	1,800	42,380	48,922	Arta
Dikhil	7,200	88,948	66,196	Dikhil
Djibouti	200	475,322	776,966	Djibouti City
Obock	4,700	37,856	37,666	Obock
Tadjourah	7,100	86,704	50,645	Tadjoura

== Geography ==
=== Location and habitat ===
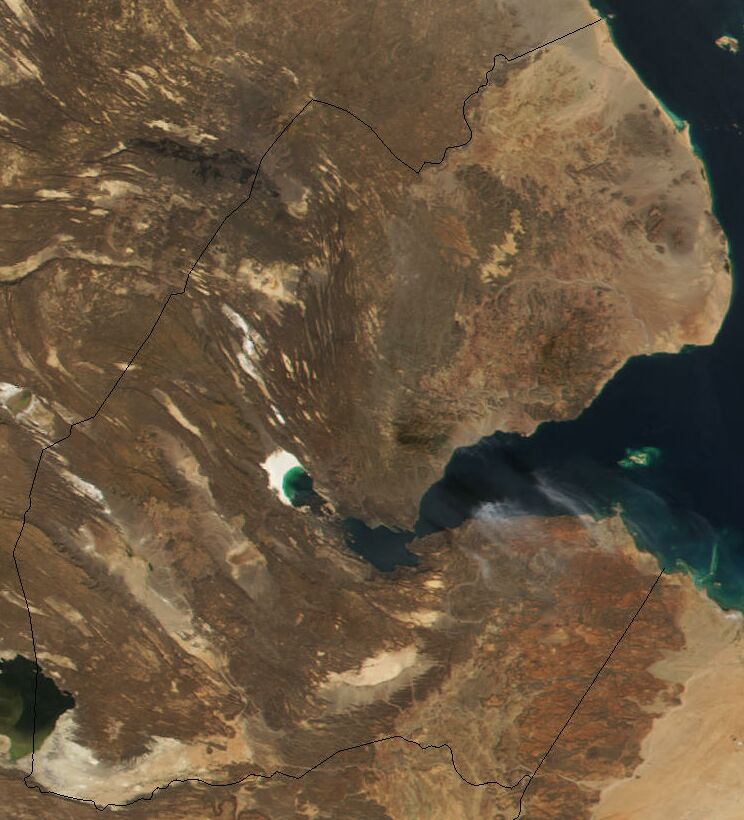
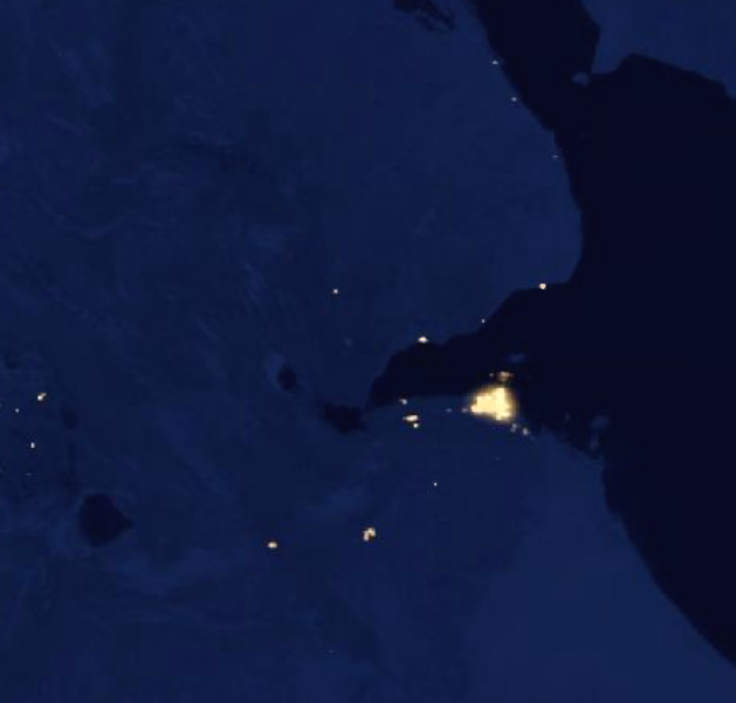
Satellite images of Djibouti during the day (left) and night (right)

Djibouti is in the Horn of Africa, on the Gulf of Aden and the Bab-el-Mandeb, at the southern entrance to the Red Sea. It lies between latitudes 11° and 14°N and longitudes 41° and 44°E, at the northernmost point of the Great Rift Valley. It is in Djibouti that the rift between the African Plate and the Somali Plate meets the Arabian Plate, forming a geologic tripoint. The tectonic interaction at this tripoint has created the lowest elevation of any place in Africa at Lake Assal, and the second-lowest depression on dry land anywhere on earth (surpassed only by the depression along the border of Jordan and Israel).

The country's coastline stretches 314 kilometres (195 miles), with terrain consisting mainly of plateau, plains and highlands. Djibouti has a total area of 23,200 square kilometres (8,958 sq mi). Its borders extend 575 km (357 mi), 125 km (78 mi) of which are shared with Eritrea, 390 km (242 mi) with Ethiopia, and 60 km (37 mi) with Somaliland. Djibouti is the southernmost country on the Arabian Plate.

Djibouti has eight mountain ranges with peaks of over 1,000 metres (3,300 feet). The Mousa Ali range is considered the country's highest mountain range, with the tallest peak on the border with Ethiopia and Eritrea. It has an elevation of 2,028 metres (6,654 feet). The Grand Bara desert covers parts of southern Djibouti in the Arta, Ali Sabieh and Dikhil regions. The majority of it sits at a relatively low elevation, below 1,700 feet (520 metres).

Extreme geographic points include: to the north, Ras Doumera and the point at which the border with Eritrea enters the Red Sea in the Obock Region; to the east, a section of the Red Sea coast north of Ras Bir; to the south, a location on the border with Ethiopia west of the town of As Ela; and to the west, a location on the frontier with Ethiopia immediately east of the Ethiopian town of Afambo.

Most of Djibouti is part of the Ethiopian xeric grasslands and shrublands. The exception is an eastern strip along the Red Sea coast, which is part of the Eritrean coastal desert.

=== Climate ===
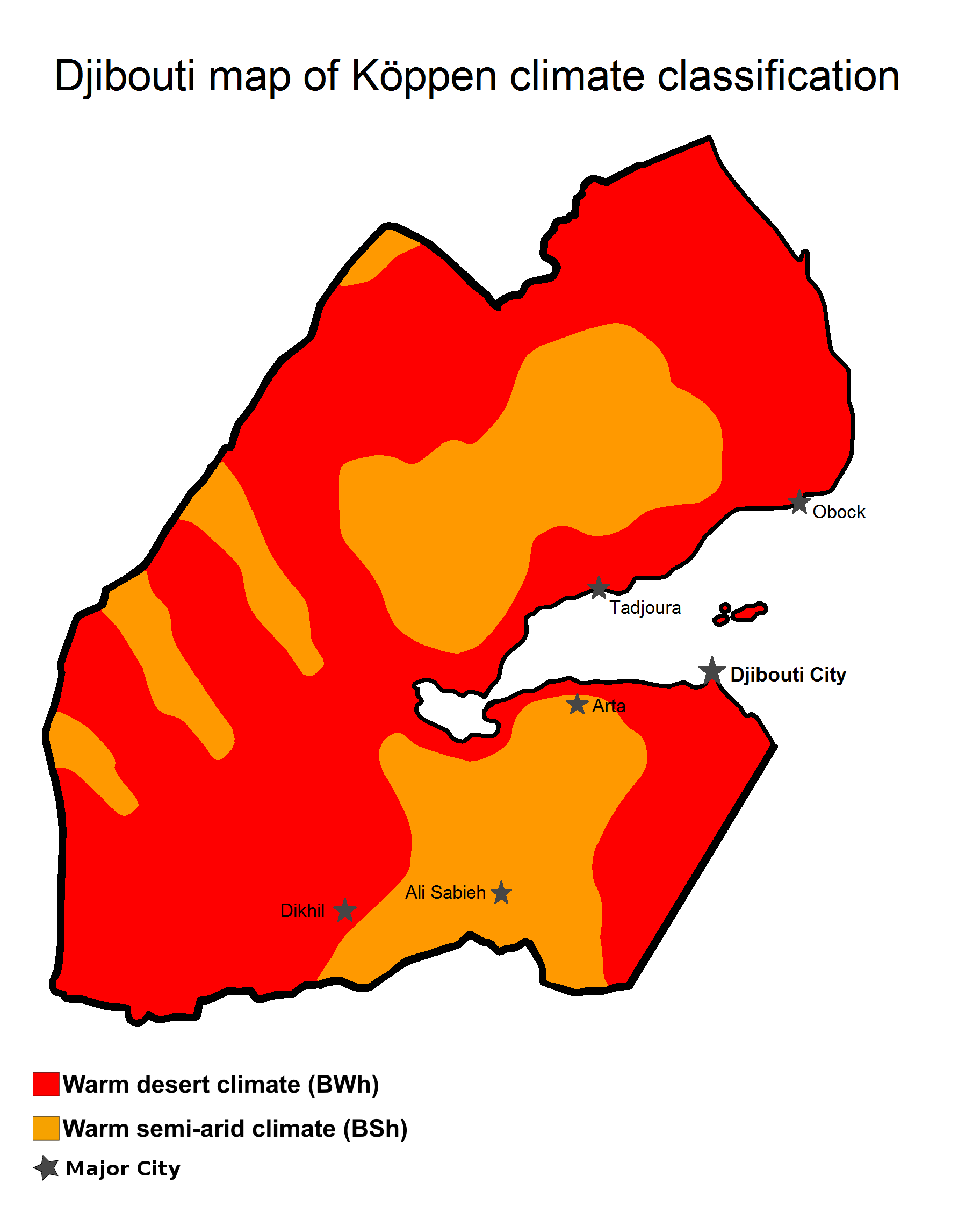
Djibouti map of Köppen climate classification Semi-arid climate Arid climate

Djibouti's climate is significantly warmer and has significantly less seasonal variation than the world average. The mean daily maximum temperatures range from 32 to 41 °C (90 to 106 °F), except at high elevations. In Djibouti City, for instance, average afternoon highs range from 28 to 34 °C (82 to 93 °F) in April. But at Airolaf, which ranges from 1,535 to 1,600 m (5,036 to 5,249 ft), maximum temperature is 30 °C (86 °F) in summer and minimum 9 °C (48 °F) in winter. In the uplands ranges from 500 to 800 m (1,600 to 2,600 ft), are comparable and cooler to those on the coast in the hottest months of June until August. December and January is the coolest month with averages low temperatures falling as low as 15 °C (59 °F). Djibouti has either a hot semi-arid climate (BSh) or a hot desert climate (BWh), although temperatures are much moderated at the highest elevations.

Djibouti's climate ranges from arid in the northeastern coastal regions to semi-arid in the central, northern, western and southern parts of the country. On the eastern seaboard, annual rainfall is less than 5 inches (130 mm); in the central highlands, precipitation is about 8 to 16 inches (200 to 410 millimetres). The hinterland is significantly less humid than the coastal regions.

Average daily temperatures for the ten cities in Djibouti
Location	July (°C)	July (°F)	January (°C)	January (°F)
Djibouti City	41/31	107/88	28/21	83/70
Ali Sabieh	36/25	96/77	26/15	79/60
Tadjoura	41/31	107/88	29/22	84/72
Dikhil	38/27	100/81	27/17	80/63
Obock	41/30	105/87	28/22	84/72
Arta	36/25	97/78	25/15	78/60
Randa	34/23	94/73	23/13	74/56
Holhol	38/28	101/81	26/17	79/62
Ali Adde	38/27	100/82	26/16	80/61
Airolaf	31/18	88/66	22/9	71/49

=== Wildlife ===
The Djibouti francolin, a critically endangered species living only in Djibouti

The country's flora and fauna live in a harsh landscape with forest accounting for less than one percent of the total area of the country. Wildlife is spread over three main regions, namely from the northern mountain region of the country to the volcanic plateaux in its southern and central part and culminating in the coastal region.

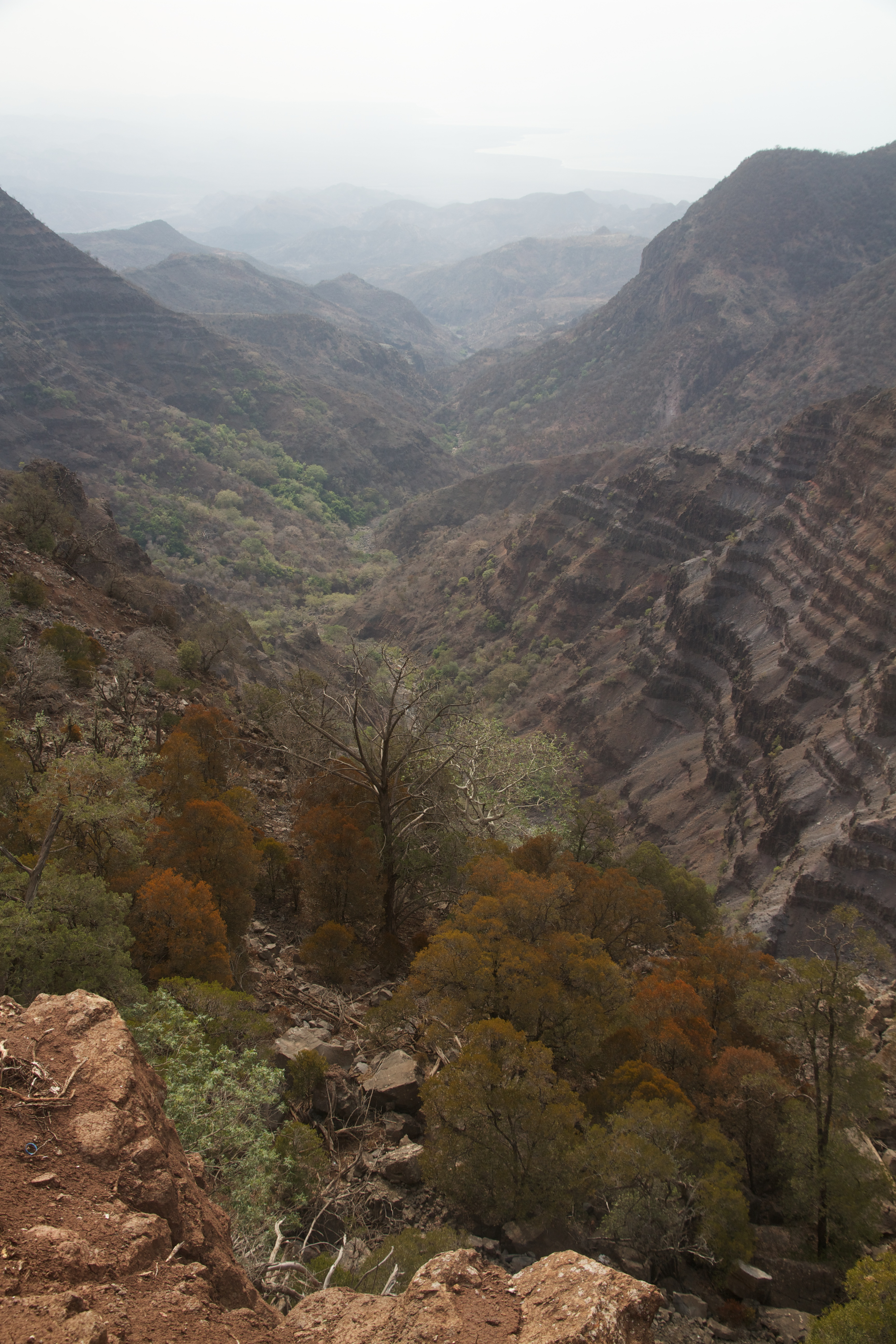
Plant species on the Forêt du Day National Park

Most species of wildlife are found in the northern part of the country, in the ecosystem of the Day Forest National Park. At an average altitude of 1,500 metres (4,921 feet), the area includes the Goda massif, with a peak of 1,783 m (5,850 ft). It covers an area of 3.5 square kilometres (1 sq mi) of Juniperus procera forest, with many of the trees rising to 20 metres (66 feet) height. This forest area is the main habitat of the endangered and endemic Djibouti francolin (a bird), and another recently noted vertebrate, Platyceps afarensis (a colubrine snake). It also contains many species of woody and herbaceous plants, including boxwood and olive trees, which account for 60% of the total identified species in the country.

According to the country profile related to biodiversity of wildlife in Djibouti, the nation contains more than 820 species of plants, 493 species of invertebrates, 455 species of fish, 40 species of reptiles, three species of amphibians, 360 species of birds and 66 species of mammals. Wildlife of Djibouti is also listed as part of Horn of Africa biodiversity hotspot and the Red Sea and Gulf of Aden coral reef hotspot. Mammals include several species of antelope, such as Soemmerring's gazelle and Pelzeln's gazelle. As a result of the hunting ban imposed since early 1970 these species are well conserved now. Other characteristic mammals are Grevy's zebra, hamadryas baboon and Hunter's antelope. The warthog, a vulnerable species, is also found in the Day National park. The coastal waters have dugongs, Green turtles, and hawksbill turtles. The Northeast African cheetah Acinonyx jubatus soemmeringii is thought to be extinct in Djibouti.

== Economy ==
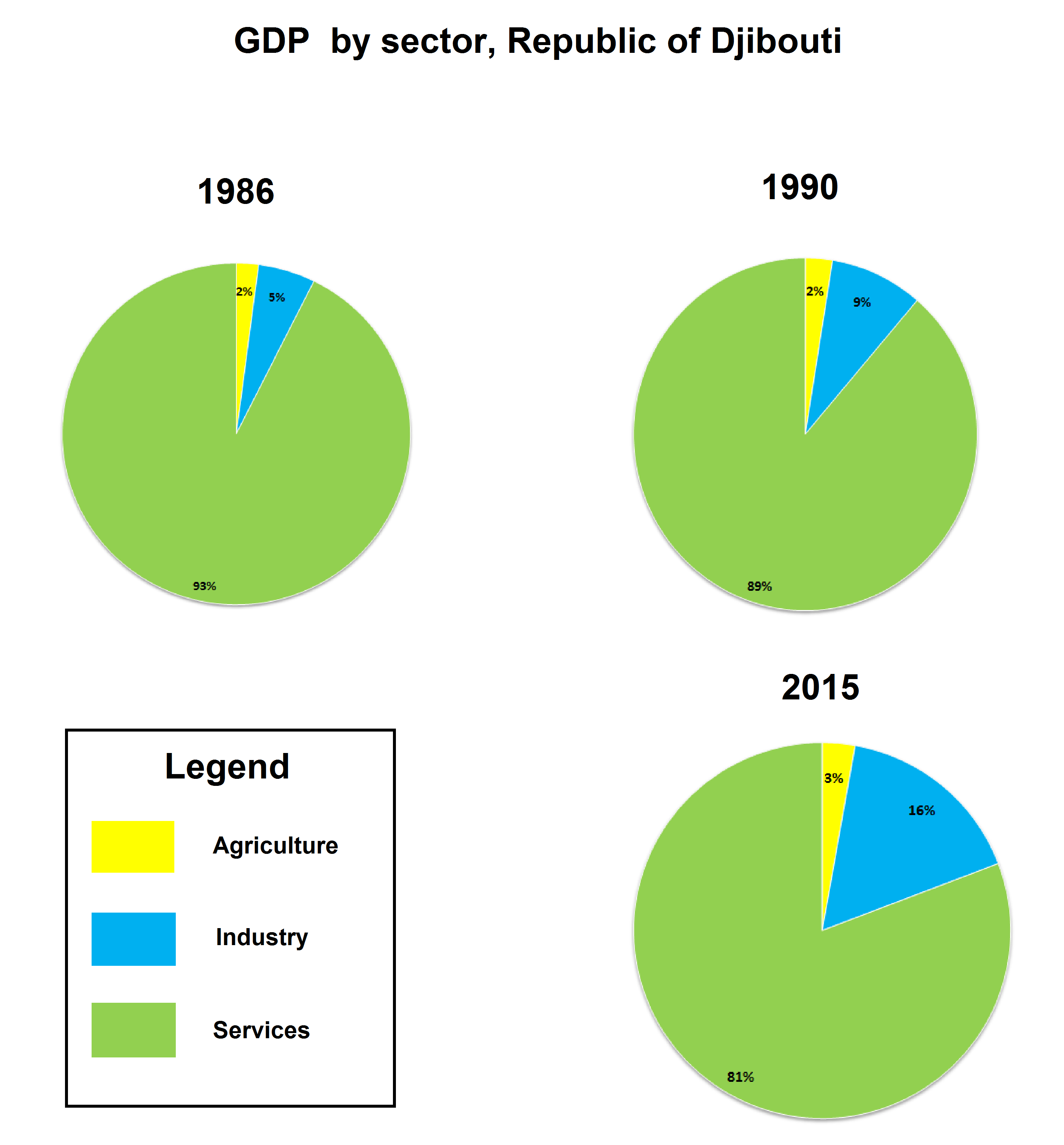
Djibouti GDP by sector

Djibouti's economy is largely concentrated in the service sector. Commercial activities revolve around the country's free trade policies and strategic location as a Red Sea transit point. Due to limited rainfall, vegetables and fruits are the principal production crops, and other food items require importation. The GDP (purchasing power parity) in 2013 was estimated at $2.505 billion, with a real growth rate of 5% annually. Per capita income is around $2,874 (PPP). The services sector constituted around 79.7% of the GDP, followed by industry at 17.3%, and agriculture at 3%.

As of 2013, the container terminal at the Port of Djibouti handles the bulk of the nation's trade. About 70% of the seaport's activity consists of imports to and exports from neighboring Ethiopia, which depends on the harbour as its main maritime outlet. As of 2018, 95% of Ethiopian transit cargo was handled by the Port of Djibouti. The port also serves as an international refueling center and transshipment hub. In 2012, the Djiboutian government in collaboration with DP World started construction of the Doraleh Container Terminal, a third major seaport intended to further develop the national transit capacity. A $396 million project, it has the capacity to accommodate 1.5 million twenty foot container units annually.

Djibouti was ranked the 177th safest investment destination in the world in the March 2011 Euromoney Country Risk rankings. To improve the environment for direct foreign investment, the Djibouti authorities in conjunction with various non-profit organizations have launched a number of development projects aimed at highlighting the country's commercial potential. The government has also introduced new private sector policies targeting high interest and inflation rates, including relaxing the tax burden on enterprises and allowing exemptions on consumption tax. Additionally, efforts have been made to lower the estimated 60% urban unemployment rate by creating more job opportunities through investment in diversified sectors. Funds have especially gone toward building telecommunications infrastructure and increasing disposable income by supporting small businesses. Owing to its growth potential, the fishing and agro-processing sector, which represents around 15% of GDP, has also enjoyed rising investment since 2008.

To expand the modest industrial sector, a 56 megawatt geothermal power plant slated to be completed by 2018 is being constructed with the help of OPEC, the World Bank and the Global Environmental Facility. The facility is expected to solve the recurring electricity shortages, decrease the nation's reliance on Ethiopia for energy, reduce costly oil imports for diesel-generated electricity, and thereby buttress the GDP and lower debt.

The Djibouti firm Salt Investment (SIS) began a large-scale operation to industrialize the plentiful salt in Djibouti's Lake Assal region. Operating at an annual capacity of 4 million tons, the desalination project has lifted export revenues, created more job opportunities, and provided more fresh water for the area's residents. In 2012, the Djibouti government also enlisted the services of the China Harbor Engineering Company Ltd for the construction of an ore terminal. Worth $64 million, the project enabled Djibouti to export a further 5,000 tons of salt per year to markets in Southeast Asia. Djibouti's gross domestic product expanded by an average of more than 6 percent per year, from US$341 million in 1985 to US$1.5 billion in 2015. The Djiboutian franc is the currency of Djibouti. It is issued by the Central Bank of Djibouti, the country's monetary authority. Since the Djiboutian franc is pegged to the U.S. dollar, it is generally stable and inflation is not a problem. This has contributed to the growing interest in investment in the country.

As of 2010, 10 conventional and Islamic banks operate in Djibouti. Most arrived within the past few years, including the Somali money transfer company Dahabshiil and BDCD, a subsidiary of Swiss Financial Investments. The banking system had previously been monopolized by two institutions: the Indo-Suez Bank and the Commercial and Industrial Bank (BCIMR). To assure a robust credit and deposit sector, the government requires commercial banks to maintain 30% of shares in the financial institution; a minimum of 300 million Djiboutian francs in up-front capital is mandatory for international banks. Lending has likewise been encouraged by the creation of a guarantee fund, which allows banks to issue loans to eligible small- and medium-sized businesses without first requiring a large deposit or other collateral.

Saudi investors are also reportedly exploring the possibility of linking the Horn of Africa with the Arabian Peninsula via a 28.5-kilometre-long (17.7 mi) oversea bridge through Djibouti, referred to as the Bridge of the Horns. The investor Tarek bin Laden has been linked to the project. In June 2010, Phase I of the project was delayed.

=== Transport ===
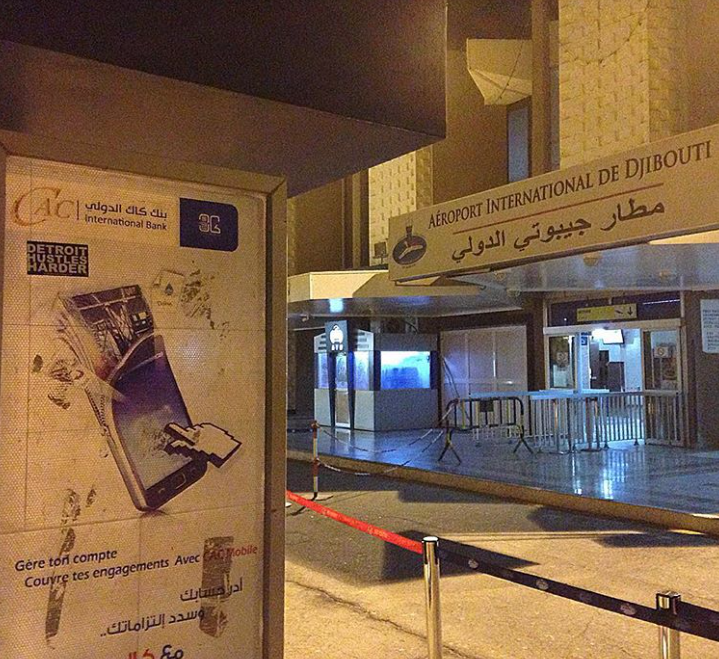
Main Terminal at Djibouti–Ambouli International Airport

The Djibouti–Ambouli International Airport in Djibouti City, the country's only international airport, serves many intercontinental routes with scheduled and chartered flights. Air Djibouti is the flag carrier of Djibouti and is the country's largest airline.

The new and electrified Addis Ababa-Djibouti Railway started operation in January 2018. Its main purpose is to facilitate freight services between the Ethiopian hinterland and the Djiboutian Port of Doraleh.

Car ferries pass the Gulf of Tadjoura from Djibouti City to Tadjoura. There is the Port of Doraleh west of Djibouti City, which is the main port of Djibouti. The Port of Doraleh is the terminal of the new Addis Ababa–Djibouti Railway. In addition to the Port of Doraleh, which handles general cargo and oil imports, Djibouti (2018) has three other major ports for the import and export of bulk goods and livestock, the Port of Tadjourah (potash), the Damerjog Port (livestock) and the Port of Goubet (salt). Over 95% of Ethiopia's imports and exports move through Djiboutian ports.

The Djiboutian highway system is named according to the road classification. Roads that are considered primary roads are those that are fully asphalted (throughout their entire length) and in general they carry traffic between all the major towns in Djibouti.

Djibouti is part of the 21st Century Maritime Silk Road that runs from the Chinese coast to the Upper Adriatic region with its connections to Central and Eastern Europe.

=== Media and telecommunications ===
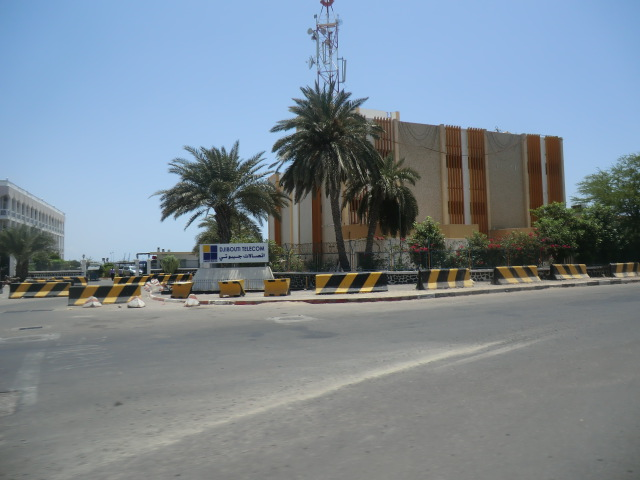
The Djibouti Telecom headquarters in Djibouti City

Telecommunications in Djibouti fall under the authority of the Ministry of Communication.

Djibouti Telecom is the sole provider of telecommunication services. It mostly utilizes a microwave radio relay network. A fiber-optic cable is installed in the capital, whereas rural areas are connected via wireless local loop radio systems. Mobile cellular coverage is primarily limited to the area in and around Djibouti city. As of 2015, 23,000 telephone main lines and 312,000 mobile/cellular lines were in use. The SEA-ME-WE 3 submarine cable operates to Jeddah, Suez, Sicily, Marseille, Colombo, Singapore and beyond. Telephone satellite earth stations include 1 Intelsat (Indian Ocean) and 1 Arabsat. Medarabtel is the regional microwave radio relay telephone network.

Radio Television of Djibouti is the state-owned national broadcaster. It operates the sole terrestrial TV station, as well as the two domestic radio networks on AM 1, FM 2, and shortwave 0. Licensing and operation of broadcast media is regulated by the government. Movie theaters include the Odeon Cinema in the capital.

As of 2012, there were 215 local internet service providers. Internet users comprised around 99,000 individuals (2015). The internet country top-level domain is .dj.

The main print newspapers are owned by the government: the French-language daily La Nation, the English weekly Djibouti Post, and the Arabic weekly Al-Qarn. There is also a state news agency, Agence Djiboutienne d'Information. Non-government news websites are based abroad; for instance, La Voix de Djibouti operates out of Belgium.

=== Tourism ===
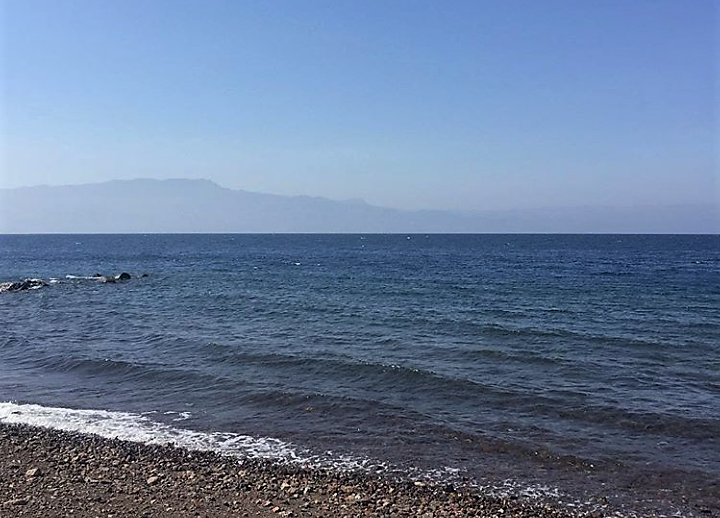
Arta Plage on the Gulf of Tadjoura

Tourism in Djibouti is one of the growing economic sectors of the country and is an industry that generates less than 80,000 arrivals per year, mostly the family and friends of the soldiers stationed in the country's major naval bases.

Infrastructure makes it difficult for tourists to travel independently and costs of private tours are high. Since the re-opening of the train line from Addis Ababa to Djibouti in January 2018, travel by land has also resumed. Djibouti's two main geological marvels, Lake Abbe and Lake Assal, are the country's top tourist destinations. The two sites draw hundreds of tourists every year looking for remote places that are not visited by many.

=== Energy ===
Djibouti has an installed electrical power generating capacity of 126 MW from fuel oil and diesel plants. In 2002 electrical power output was put at 232 GWh, with consumption at 216 GWh. At 2015, per capita annual electricity consumption is about 330 kilowatt-hours (kWh); moreover, about 45% of the population does not have access to electricity, and the level of unmet demand in the country's power sector is significant. Increased hydropower imports from Ethiopia, which satisfies 65% of Djibouti's demand, will play a significant role in boosting the country's renewable energy supply. The geothermal potential has generated particular interest in Japan, with 13 potential sites; they have already started the construction on one site near Lake Assal. The construction of the photovoltaic power station (solar farms) in Grand Bara will generate 50 MW capacity.

== Demographics ==
A Somali woman in nomadic attire

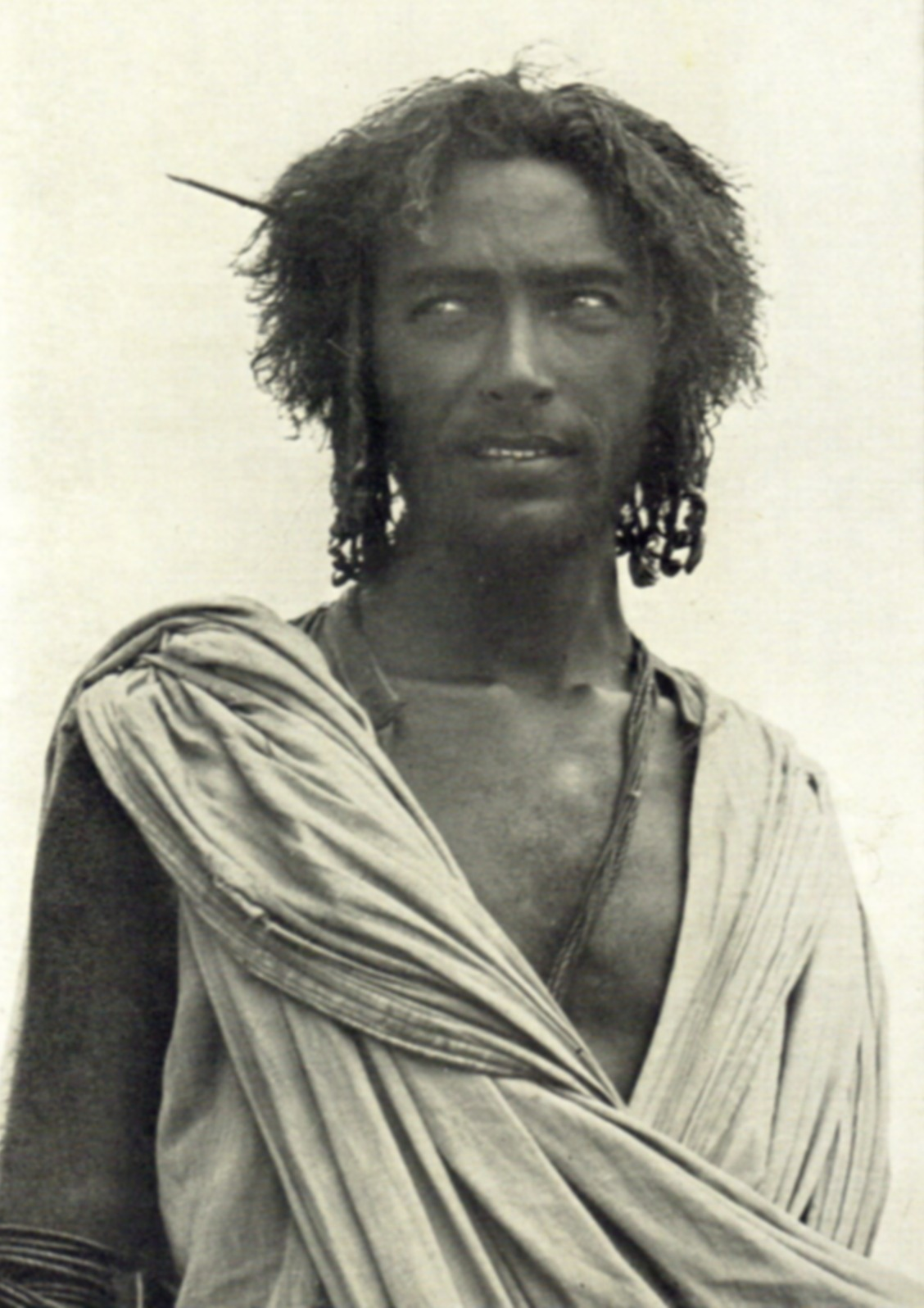
An Afar man in nomadic attire

Historical population
Year	Pop.	±% p.a.
1950	62,001	—
1955	69,589	+2.34%
1960	83,636	+3.75%
1965	114,963	+6.57%
1970	159,659	+6.79%
1977	277,750	+8.23%
1980	358,960	+8.93%
1985	425,613	+3.47%
1990	590,398	+6.76%
1995	630,388	+1.32%
2000	717,584	+2.62%
2005	784,256	+1.79%
2010	850,146	+1.63%
2015	869,099	+0.44%
2018	884,017	+0.57%
2024	1,066,809	+3.18%
Source: World Bank to 2018; 2024 Census by Institut National de la Statistique de Djibouti, INSTAD.

Djibouti had a population of 1,066,809 inhabitants at the Census held on 20 May 2024. It is a multiethnic country. The local population grew rapidly during the latter half of the 20th century, increasing from about 69,589 in 1955 to around 869,099 by 2015. The two largest ethnic groups native to Djibouti are the Somalis (60%) and the Afar (35%). The Somali clan component is mainly composed of the Issa (who make up 33%), followed by the Gadabuursi (15–20%) and the Isaaq (13.3-20%). The remaining 5% of Djibouti's population primarily consists of Yemeni Arabs, Ethiopians and Europeans (French and Italians). Approximately 76% of local residents are urban dwellers; the remainder are pastoralists. Djibouti also hosts a number of immigrants and refugees from neighboring states, with Djibouti City nicknamed the "French Hong Kong in the Red Sea" due to its cosmopolitan urbanism. Djibouti's location on the eastern coast of Africa makes it a hub of regional migration, with Somalis, Yemenis, and Ethiopians traveling through the country en route to the Gulf and northern Africa. Djibouti has received a massive influx of migrants from Yemen.

Languages of Djibouti
1. Somali (60.0%)
2. Afar (35.0%)
3. Arabic (2.00%)
4. Other (3.00%)
Islam in Djibouti (Pew)
1. Sunnism (87.0%)
2. Non-denominational Muslims (8.00%)
3. Other Muslim (3.00%)
4. Shi'ism (2.00%)

=== Languages ===
Djibouti is a multilingual nation. The majority of local residents speak Somali (60%) and Afar (35%) as first languages. They are the mother tongues of the Somali and Afar ethnic groups, respectively. Both languages belong to the larger Afroasiatic Cushitic family. Northern Somali is the main dialect spoken in the country and in neighbouring Somaliland, in contrast to Benadiri Somali which is the main dialect spoken in Somalia. There are two official languages in Djibouti: Arabic and French.

Arabic is of religious importance. In formal settings, it consists of Modern Standard Arabic. Colloquially, about 59,000 local residents speak the Ta'izzi-Adeni Arabic dialect, also known as Djibouti Arabic. French serves as a statutory national language. It was inherited from the colonial period, and is the primary language of instruction. Around 17,000 Djiboutians speak it as a first language. Immigrant languages include Omani Arabic (38,900 speakers), Amharic (1,400 speakers), and Greek (1,000 speakers).

=== Religion ===
Religion in Djibouti (ARDA 2020 est.)
1. Sunni (97.8%)
2. Christianity (1.01%)
3. Baháʼí (0.09%)
4. Hinduism (0.04%)
5. No religion (1.04%)

Djibouti's population is predominantly Muslim. Islam is observed by around 98% of the nation's population (approximately 891,000 as of 2022). As of 2012, 94% of the population was Muslim whereas the remaining 6% of residents are Christian adherents.

Islam entered the region very early on, as a group of persecuted Muslims had sought refuge across the Red Sea in the Horn of Africa at the urging of the Islamic prophet Muhammad. In 1900, during the early part of the colonial era, there were virtually no Christians in the territories, with only about 100–300 followers coming from the schools and orphanages of the few Catholic missions in the French Somaliland. The Constitution of Djibouti names Islam as the sole state religion, and also provides for the equality of citizens of all faiths (Article 1) and freedom of religious practice (Article 11). Most local Muslims adhere to the Sunni denomination, following the Shafi'i school. The non-denominational Muslims largely belong to Sufi orders of varying schools. According to the International Religious Freedom Report 2008, while Muslim Djiboutians have the legal right to convert to or marry someone from another faith, converts may encounter negative reactions from their family and clan or from society at large, and they often face pressure to go back to Islam.

The Diocese of Djibouti serves the small local Catholic population, which it estimates numbered around 7,000 individuals in 2006.

=== Largest cities ===
Largest cities or towns in Djibouti According to the 2009 Census
Rank	Name	Region	Pop.
1	Djibouti	Djibouti	475,322
2	Ali Sabieh	Ali Sabieh	37,939
3	Dikhil	Dikhil	24,886
4	Tadjoura	Tadjourah	14,820
5	Arta	Arta	13,260
6	Obock	Obock	11,706
7	Ali Adde	Ali Sabieh	3,500
8	Holhol	Ali Sabieh	3,000
9	Airolaf	Tadjourah	1,023
10	Randa	Tadjourah	1,023

=== Health ===
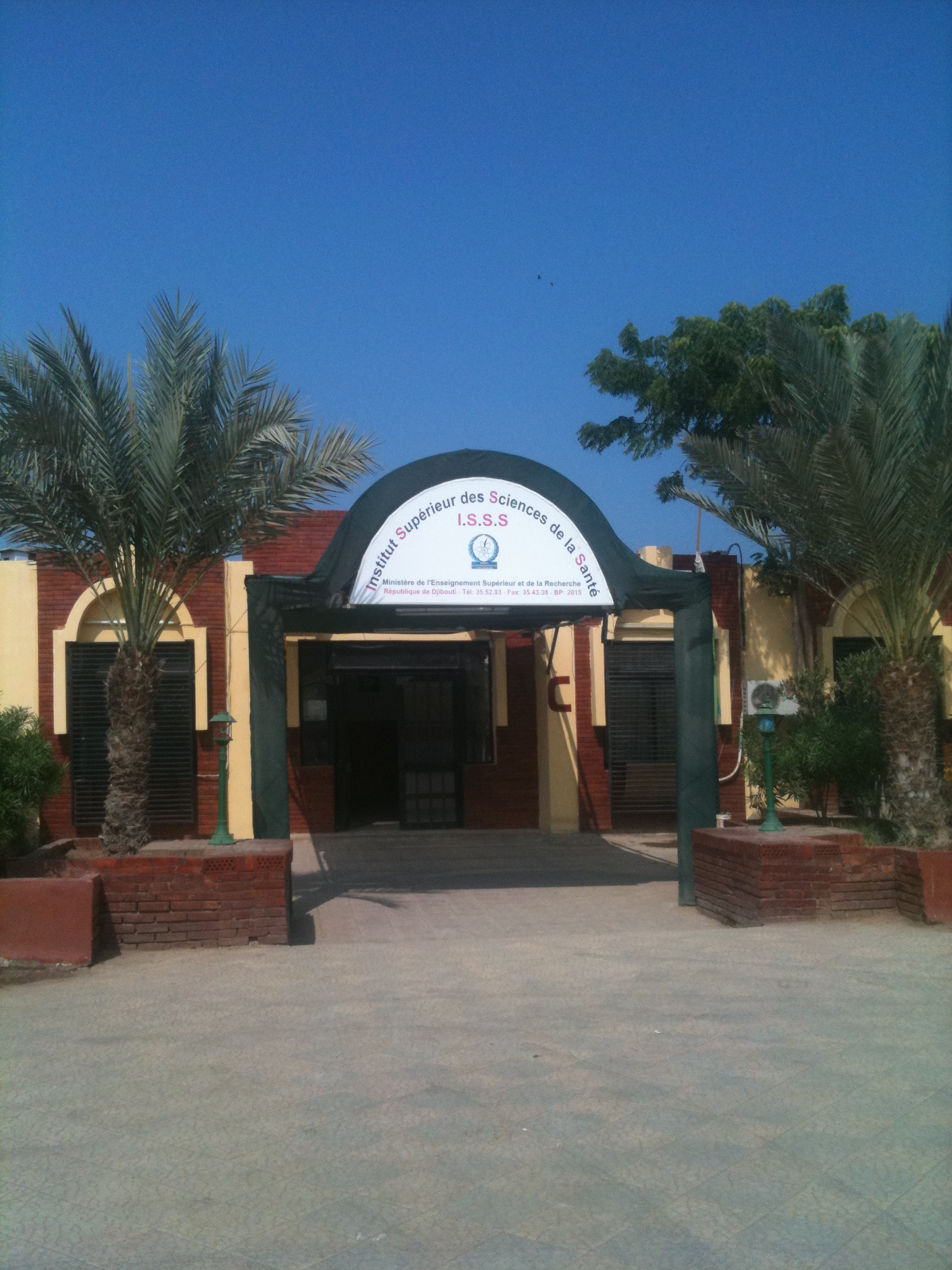
Entrance to the ISSS Faculty of Medicine in Djibouti City

The life expectancy at birth is around 64.7 for both males and females. Fertility is at 2.35 children per woman. In Djibouti there are about 18 doctors per 100,000 persons.

The 2010 maternal mortality rate per 100,000 births for Djibouti is 300. This is compared with 461.6 in 2008 and 606.5 in 1990. The under 5 mortality rate per 1,000 births is 95 and the neonatal mortality as a percentage of under 5's mortality are 37. In Djibouti the number of midwives per 1,000 live births is 6 and the lifetime risk of death for pregnant women 1 in 93.

About 93.1% of Djibouti's women and girls have undergone female genital mutilation (FGM, sometimes referred to as 'female circumcision'), a pre-marital custom mainly endemic to Northeast Africa and parts of the Near East. Although legally proscribed in 1994, the procedure is still widely practiced, as it is deeply ingrained in the local culture. Encouraged and performed by women in the community, FGM is primarily intended to deter promiscuity and to offer protection from assault. About 94% of Djibouti's male population have also reportedly undergone male circumcision, a figure in line with adherence to Islam; the Shafi'i school of Islam, the predominant madhhab in the Horn of Africa, requires circumcision of males and females.

=== Education ===
Education is a priority for the government of Djibouti. As of 2009, it allocates 20.5% of its annual budget to scholastic instruction.

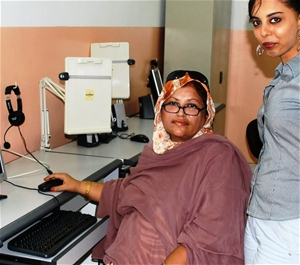
Djiboutian women participating in the Global Pulse educational initiative (2010)

The Djiboutian educational system was initially formulated to cater to a limited pupil base. As such, the schooling framework was largely elitist and drew considerably from the French colonial paradigm, which was ill-suited to local circumstances and needs.

In the late 1990s, the Djiboutian authorities revised the national educational strategy and launched a broad-based consultative process involving administrative officials, teachers, parents, national assembly members and NGOs. The initiative identified areas in need of attention and produced concrete recommendations on how to go about improving them. The government subsequently prepared a comprehensive reform plan aimed at modernizing the educational sector over the 2000–10 period. In August 2000, it passed an official Education Planning Act and drafted a medium-term development plan for the next five years. The fundamental academic system was significantly restructured and made compulsory; it now consists of five years of primary school and four years of middle school. Secondary schools also require a Certificate of Fundamental Education for admission. In addition, the new law introduced secondary-level vocational instruction and established university facilities in the country.

As a result of the Education Planning Act and the medium-term action strategy, substantial progress has been registered throughout the educational sector. In particular, school enrollment, attendance, and retention rates have all steadily increased, with some regional variation. From 2004 to 2005 to 2007–08, net enrollments of girls in primary school rose by 18.6%; for boys, it increased 8.0%. Net enrollments in middle school over the same period rose by 72.4% for girls and 52.2% for boys. At the secondary level, the rate of increase in net enrollments was 49.8% for girls and 56.1% for boys.

The Djiboutian government has especially focused on developing and improving institutional infrastructure and teaching materials, including constructing new classrooms and supplying textbooks. At the post-secondary level, emphasis has also been placed on producing qualified instructors and encouraging out-of-school youngsters to pursue vocational training. As of 2012, the literacy rate in Djibouti was estimated at 70%.

Institutions of higher learning in the country include the University of Djibouti.

== Culture ==
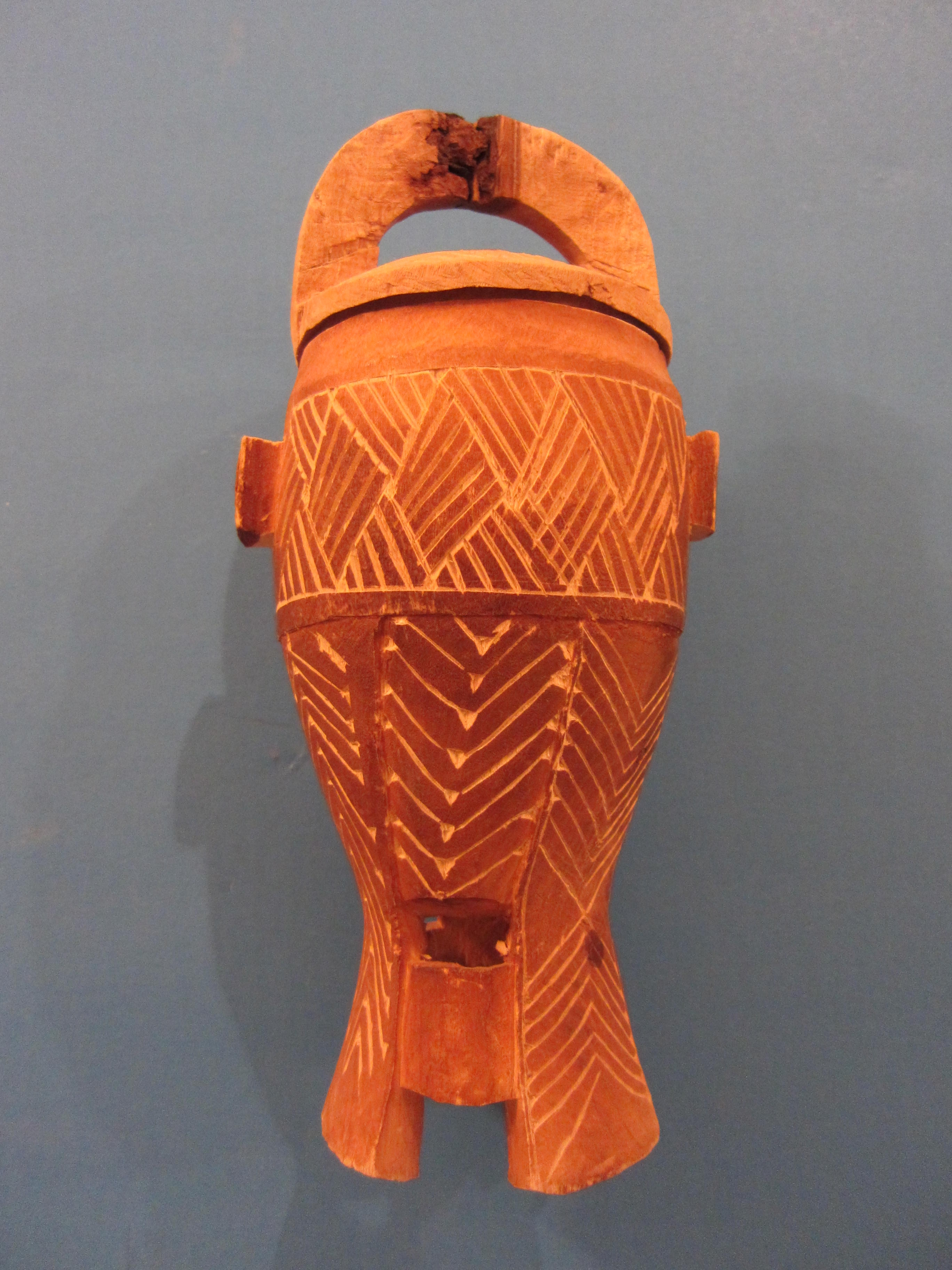
Traditional wood-carved jar from Oue'a in the Tadjourah region

Djiboutian attire reflects the region's hot and arid climate. When not dressed in Western clothing such as jeans and T-shirts, men typically wear the macawiis, which is a traditional sarong-like garment worn around the waist. Many nomadic people wear a loosely wrapped white cotton robe called a tobe that goes down to about the knee, with the end thrown over the shoulder.

Women typically wear the dirac, which is a long, light, diaphanous voile dress made of cotton or polyester that is worn over a full-length half-slip and a bra. Married women tend to sport head-scarves referred to as shash and often cover their upper body with a shawl known as garbasaar. Unmarried or young women do not always cover their heads. Traditional Arabian garb such as the male jellabiya (jellabiyaad in Somali) and the female jilbāb is also commonly worn. For some occasions such as festivals, women may adorn themselves with specialized jewelry and head-dresses similar to those worn by the Berber tribes of the Maghreb.

A lot of Djibouti's original art is passed on and preserved orally, mainly through song. Many examples of Islamic, Ottoman, and French influences can also be noted in the local buildings, which contain plasterwork, carefully constructed motifs, and calligraphy.

=== Music ===
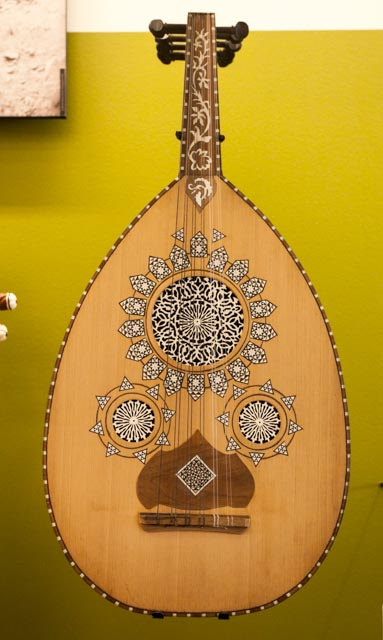
The oud is a common instrument in traditional Djibouti music.

Somalis have a rich musical heritage centered on traditional Somali folklore. Most Somali songs are pentatonic. That is, they only use five pitches per octave in contrast to a heptatonic (seven note) scale such as the major scale. At first listen, Somali music might be mistaken for the sounds of nearby regions such as Ethiopia, Sudan or the Arabian Peninsula, but it is ultimately recognizable by its own unique tunes and styles. Somali songs are usually the product of collaboration between lyricists (midho), songwriters (laxan) and singers (codka or "voice"). Balwo is a Somali musical style centered on love themes that is popular in Djibouti.

Traditional Afar music resembles the folk music of other parts of the Horn of Africa such as Ethiopia; it also contains elements of Arabic music. The history of Djibouti is recorded in the poetry and songs of its nomadic people, and goes back thousands of years to a time when the peoples of Djibouti traded hides and skins for the perfumes and spices of ancient Egypt, India and China. Afar oral literature is also quite musical. It comes in many varieties, including songs for weddings, war, praise and boasting.

=== Literature ===
Djibouti has a long tradition of poetry. Several well-developed Somali forms of verse include the gabay, jiifto, geeraar, wiglo, 'buraanbur, beercade, afarey and guuraw. The gabay (epic poem) has the most complex length and meter, often exceeding 100 lines. It is considered the mark of poetic attainment when a young poet is able to compose such verse, and is regarded as the height of poetry. Groups of memorizers and reciters (hafidayaal) traditionally propagated the well-developed art form. Poems revolve around several main themes, including baroorodiiq (elegy), amaan (praise), jacayl (romance), guhaadin (diatribe), digasho (gloating) and guubaabo (guidance). The baroorodiiq is composed to commemorate the death of a prominent poet or figure. The Afar are familiar with the ginnili, a kind of warrior-poet and diviner, and have a rich oral tradition of folk stories. They also have an extensive repertoire of battle songs.

Additionally, Djibouti has a long tradition of Islamic literature. Among the most prominent historical works is the medieval Futuh al-Habasha by Shihāb al-Dīn, which chronicles the Adal Sultanate's Conquest of Abyssinia during the 16th century. In recent years, a number of politicians and intellectuals have also penned memoirs or reflections on the country.

=== Sport ===
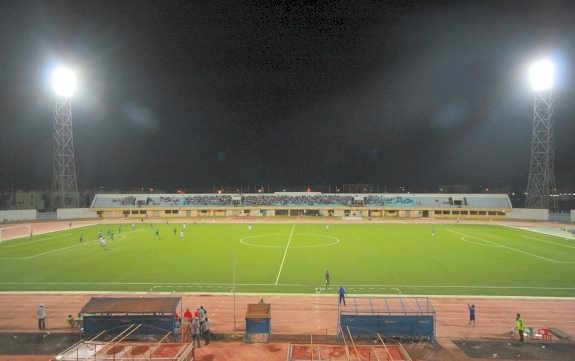
El Hadj Hassan Gouled Aptidon Stadium in Djibouti City

Football is the most popular sport amongst Djiboutians. The country became a member of FIFA in 1994, but has only taken part in the qualifying rounds for the African Cup of Nations as well as the FIFA World Cup in the mid-2000s. In November 2007, the Djibouti national football team beat Somalia's national squad 1–0 in the qualification rounds for the 2010 FIFA World Cup, marking its first ever World Cup-related win.

Recently, the World Archery Federation has helped to implement the Djibouti Archery Federation, and an international archery training center is being created in Arta to support archery development in East Africa and Red Sea area.

=== Cuisine ===
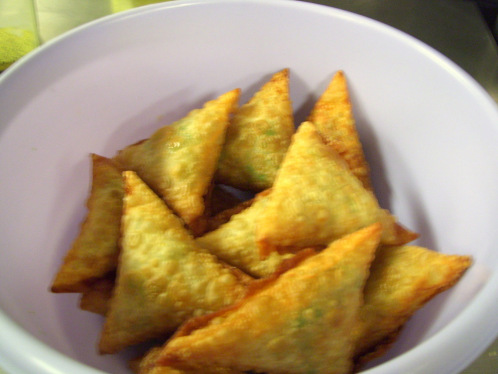
A plate of sambusas, a popular traditional snack

Djiboutian cuisine is a mixture of Somali, Afar, Yemeni, and French cuisine, with some additional South Asian (especially Indian) culinary influences. Local dishes are commonly prepared using a lot of Middle Eastern spices, ranging from saffron to cinnamon. Grilled Yemeni fish, opened in half and often cooked in tandoori style ovens, are a local delicacy. Spicy dishes come in many variations, from the traditional Fah-fah or "Soupe Djiboutienne" (spicy boiled beef soup), to the yetakelt wet (spicy mixed vegetable stew). Xalwo (pronounced "halwo") or halva is a popular confection eaten during festive occasions, such as Eid celebrations or wedding receptions. Halva is made from sugar, corn starch, cardamom powder, nutmeg powder and ghee. Peanuts are sometimes added to enhance texture and flavor. After meals, homes are traditionally perfumed using incense (cuunsi) or frankincense (lubaan), which is prepared inside an incense burner referred to as a dabqaad.

== See also ==
- Outline of Djibouti
