= Djibouti Armed Forces =

Djiboutian Armed Forces
- الجيش الجيبوتي (Arabic); Ciidanka Dalka Jabuuti (Somali); Force Armée Djiboutienne (French)
- Emblem of the Djiboutian Armed Force

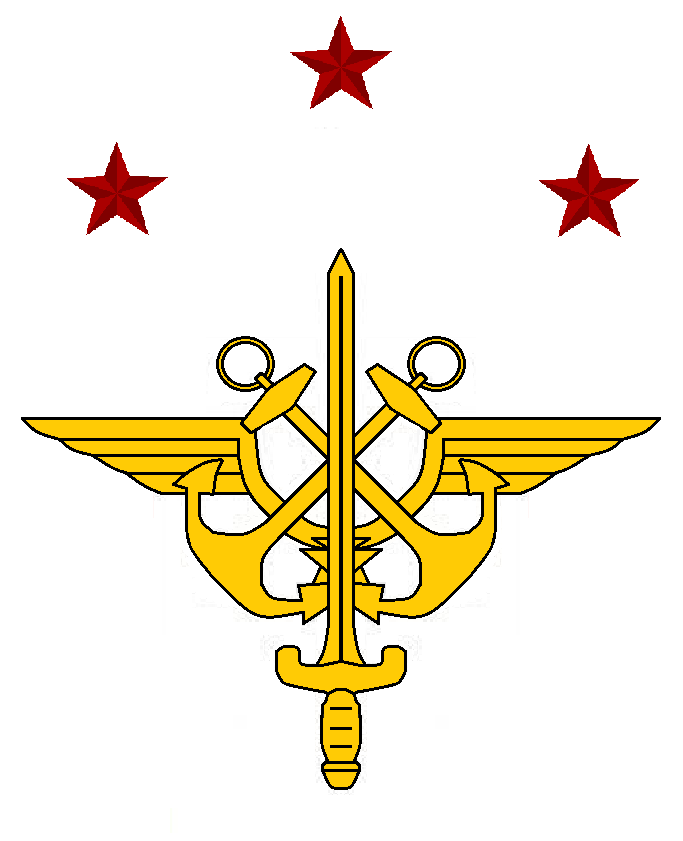
- Official Badge of the Djiboutian Armed Forces
- Motto: Guul ama Dhimasho (Victory or Death)
- Founded: 6 June 1977; 49 years ago
- Service branches: Djiboutian Army; Djiboutian Air Force; Djiboutian Navy; Djiboutian Gendarmerie; Republican Guard; Djiboutian Coast Guard

Leadership
- Commander-in-Chief: Ismaïl Omar Guelleh
- Prime Minister: Abdoulkader Kamil Mohamed
- Minister of Defence: Hassan Omar Mohamed
- Chief of the General Staff: General Zakaria Chiek Imbrahim

Personnel
- Active personnel: 20,470 (2018 est.)
- Reserve personnel: 12,220 (2018 est.)
- Deployed personnel: Somalia – 3,500; Central African Republic – 195 Gendarmerie; Democratic Republic of the Congo - 25 Police

Expenditure
- Budget: $195 million (2021 est.)
- Percent of GDP: 3.5% (2019 est.)

Industry
- Foreign suppliers: China; European Union; France; Italy; Russia; Switzerland; South Africa; Turkey; United Kingdom; United States

Related articles
- History: Military history of Djibouti: Djiboutian Civil War; Djiboutian–Eritrean border conflict United Nations–African Union Mission in Darfur; African Union Mission to Somalia; African Union Transition Mission in Somalia
- Ranks: Military ranks of Djibouti

The Djibouti Armed Forces (DJAF; French: Force Armée Djiboutienne, FAD; Arabic: الجيش الجيبوتي, romanized: aljaysh aljibutiu; Somali: Ciidanka Dalka Jabuuti) are the military forces of Djibouti. They consist of the Djiboutian National Army and its sub-branches the Djiboutian Air Force and Djiboutian Navy. As of 2018, the Djibouti Armed Forces consists of 20,470 (2018 est.) ground troops, which are divided into several regiments and battalions garrisoned in various areas throughout the country. The Djibouti Armed Forces are an important player in the Bab-el-Mandeb and Red Sea.

In 2015 General Zakaria Chiek Imbrahim was chief d'etat-major general (chief of staff) of the Forces Armees Djiboutiennes. He assumed command in November 2013.

Djibouti has always been a very active member in the African Union and the Arab League.

== History ==
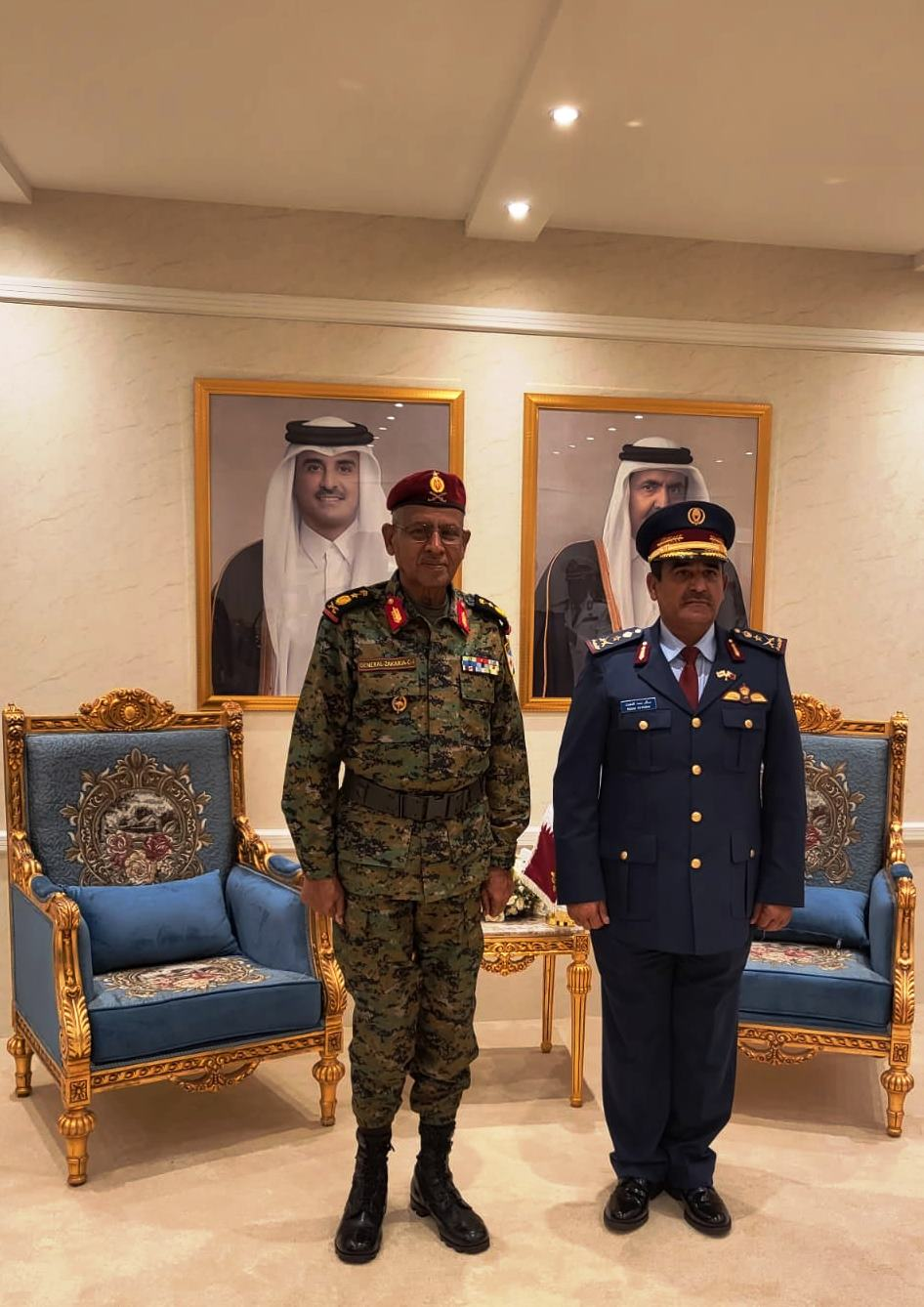
Meeting between Chief of the Defence Staff General Zakaria Cheikh Ibrahim and Qatari Chief of Staff Lieutenant General Salem bin Hamad bin Mohammed bin Aqeel Al Nabit

Historically, Somali society accorded prestige to the warrior (waranle) and rewarded military prowess. Except for men of religion (wadaad), who were few in number, all Somali males were considered potential warriors. Djibouti's many Sultanates each maintained regular troops. In the early Middle Ages, the conquest of Shewa by the Ifat Sultanate ignited a rivalry for supremacy with the Solomonic Dynasty.

Many similar battles were fought between the succeeding Sultanate of Adal and the Solomonids, with both sides achieving victory and suffering defeat. During the protracted Ethiopian-Adal War (1529–1559), Imam Ahmad ibn Ibrihim al-Ghazi defeated several Ethiopian Emperors and embarked on a conquest referred to as the Futuh Al-Habash ("Conquest of Abyssinia"), which brought three-quarters of Christian Abyssinia under the power of the Muslim Adal Sultanate. Al-Ghazi's forces and their Ottoman allies came close to extinguishing the ancient Ethiopian kingdom, but the Abyssinians managed to secure the assistance of Cristóvão da Gama's Portuguese troops and maintain their domain's autonomy. However, both polities in the process exhausted their resources and manpower, which resulted in the contraction of both powers and changed regional dynamics for centuries to come.

=== First World War ===
The 1st Battalion of Somali Skirmishers, formed in 1915 from recruits from the French Somali Coast, was a unit belonging to the French Colonial Army. They distinguished themselves during the First World War, notably during the recapture of Fort Douaumont, Battle of Verdun in October 1916 alongside the Régiment d'infanterie-chars de marine, and the Second Battle of the Aisne in October 1917. In May and June 1918, they took part in the Third Battle Of The Aisne and in July in the Second Battle of the Marne. In August and September 1918, the Somali battalion fought on the Oise front and in October 1918 it obtained its second citation to the order of the army as well as the right to wear a Fourragère in the colors of the ribbon of the Croix de guerre 1914–1918. Between 1915 and 1918, over 2,088 Djiboutians served in combat in the First World War. Their losses are estimated at 517 killed and 1,000 to 1,200 injured.

=== Second World War ===
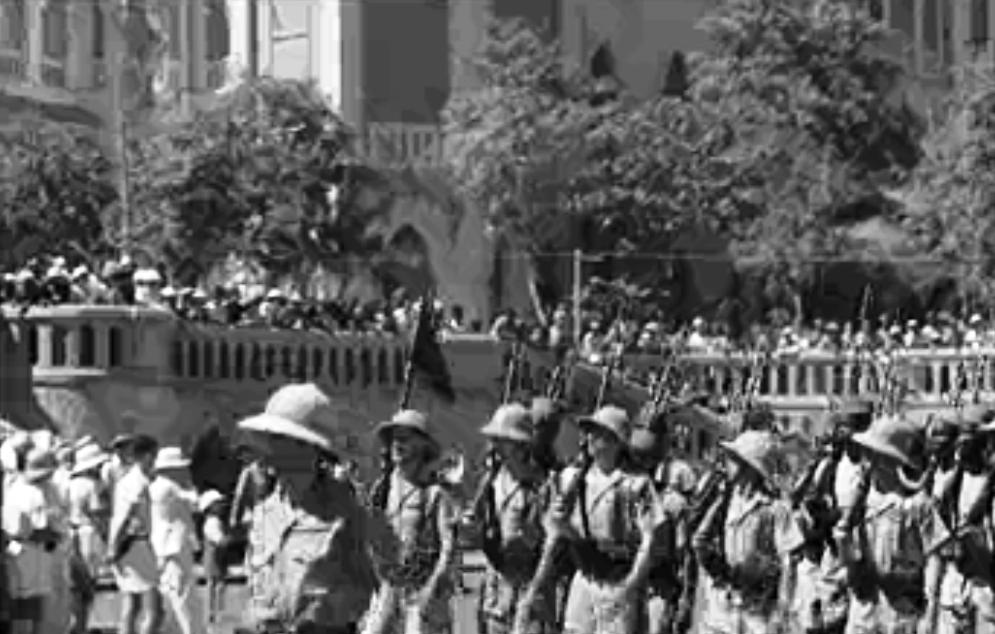
British Military Parade in Presidential Palace, Djibouti City 1942

During the Italian invasion and occupation of Ethiopia in the mid-1930s and during the early stages of World War II, constant border skirmishes occurred between the forces in French Somaliland and the forces in Italian East Africa. After the fall of France in 1940, French Somaliland declared loyalty to Vichy France. The colony remained loyal to Vichy France during the East African Campaign but stayed out of that conflict. British forces in Ethiopia begin dropping leaflets calling on the French Somaliland to rally to Free France. The newspaper Djibouti Libre published in Dire Dawa is also air dropped into the Vichy controlled colony and a 15-minute newscast is broadcast over the radio. In 1942: Vichy recalls Governor Pierre Nouailhetas after his superiors decide that he is in too close contact with the British. Nouailhetas delegates his authority to the military commander General Truffert. Two battalions, accompanied by civilians, leave Djibouti to join the British forces in British Somaliland. General Truffert is forced to resign and cede power to his adjutant General Dupont after a great majority of Djibouti's military and civil administrators threaten to leave for British held Somaliland. This lasted until December 1942. By that time, the Italians had been defeated and the French colony was isolated by a British blockade. Free French and Allied forces recaptured the colony's capital of Djibouti at the end of 1942. A local battalion of Somali skirmishers to participate in the battles for the liberation of France, it participated in particular in the fighting at Pointe de Grave in April 1945. On April 22, 1945, General de Gaulle awarded the Somali battalion a citation to the army and decorated the battalion's pennant in Soulac-sur-Mer. The Somali battalion was dissolved on June 25, 1946.

=== Ogaden War ===
The Ogaden War (13 July 1977 – 15 March 1978) was a conflict fought between the Ethiopian government and Somali government. The Djibouti government supported Somalia with military intelligence. In a notable illustration of the nature of Cold War alliances, the Soviet Union switched from supplying aid to Somalia to supporting Ethiopia, which had previously been backed by the United States. This in turn prompted the U.S. to later start supporting Somalia. The war ended when Somali forces retreated back across the border and a truce was declared.

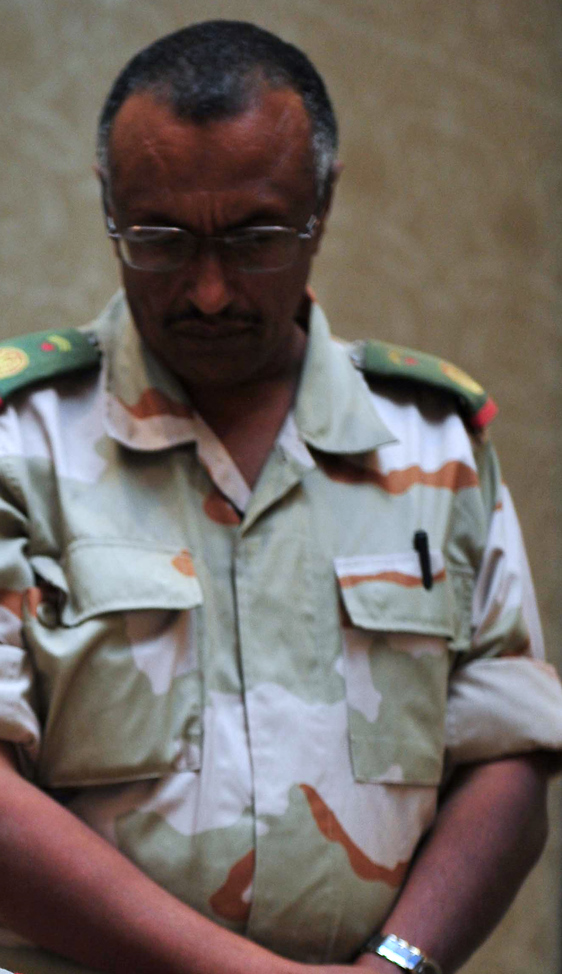
A Djibouti Armed Forces commander.

=== Ethiopian Civil War ===
In the 27 May to June 13, 1991, the Djiboutian Armed Forces and FFDJ participated in Operation Godoria. The President of the Djiboutian Republic, Hassan Gouled Aptidon described this as a "invasion". At the end of May 1991, the collapse of the Ethiopian regime the Assab loyalist division. Crossed the border at dawn, cornered on the northern border of Djibouti, Assab's division, 9,000 strong, crossed the Djiboutian-Ethiopian border with arms and luggage and headed towards Obock. Simultaneously, another division crossed the Western border and moved towards Dikhil. This violation of the borders by a regular foreign army falls strictly within the framework of the protocols passed between France and Djibouti. This is why, on May 26 at 10:30 p.m., Operation Godoria is launched, all Djiboutian and French forces, land, air and sea stationed in Djibouti participate in it. Djiboutian Army, prohibit Ethiopian troops from surging towards the south. Djiboutian and French troops deployed, facing the firmness of their interlocutors, the Ethiopian officers yielded to the demands and agreed to continue the disarmament already begun. The 5th Overseas Interarms Regiment took charge of a detachment of 4,300 military refugees, accompanied by a few families and embarked in 120 vehicles of all types heading towards the southern border. The initial aim is to clean up a border area of 150 km2, collect, remove supplies, inventory and hand over abandoned weapons to the Djiboutian authorities. The "Lynx Mike" detachment identifies thousands of individual and collective weapons, includes the T 55, ZU-23-2, BTR and BRDM, finally destroys the 50 tons of unpackaged ammunition of all calibers. From May 30 to June 13, there will be a total of 12,500 weapons from the AK47 to the T64, including LRMs, 122 howitzers and more than 200 tons of ammunition from the 200 kg bomb to the cartridge factory, via rockets LRM which will have been moved, sorted, stored, even for some of them neutralized or destroyed. For the first time since the accession to independence of Djibouti, the Djiboutian national army and the French forces placed in a highly operational environment, will have proved the validity of the defense agreements binding the two countries contributed to the success of this mission to safeguard the Republic of Djibouti. Perfectly impregnated with the spirit of the mission, the porpoises, from the colonel to the simple soldier, knew how to demand from this Ethiopian army, demoralized, but still supervised, the strict application of the orders emanating from the civil and military authorities, Djiboutian and French, in starting with disarmament before providing them with the food support that has become essential. Around 10:00 am, the convoy begins its progress in the direction of Ali Sabieh. Then reached Ali Sabieh where the refugees were taken care of by the Djiboutian Army and the High Commissioner for Refugees. Most will reach the region of Dire Dawa, in eastern Ethiopia.

=== Djiboutian Civil War ===
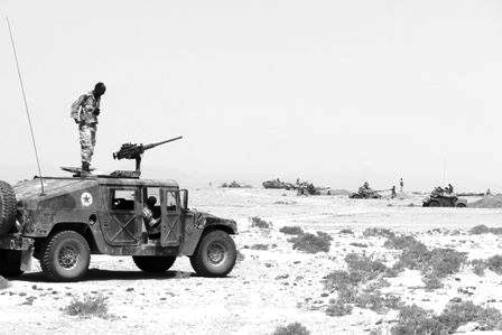
Djiboutian troops with Humvees near the border of Eritrea

The first war which involved the Djiboutian armed forces was the Djiboutian Civil War between the Djiboutian government, supported by France, and the Front for the Restoration of Unity and Democracy (FRUD). The war lasted from 1991 to 2001, although most of the hostilities ended when the moderate factions of FRUD signed a peace treaty with the government after suffering an extensive military setback when the government forces captured most of the rebel-held territory. A radical group continued to fight the government, but signed its own peace treaty in 2001. The war ended in a government victory, and FRUD became a political party.

=== Djiboutian–Eritrean border conflict ===
Djibouti has fought in clashes against Eritrea over the Ras Doumeira peninsula, which both countries claim to be under their sovereignty. The first clash occurred in 1996 after a nearly two-months stand-off. In 1999, a political crisis occurred when both sides accused each other for supporting its enemies. In 2008, the countries clashed again when Djibouti refused to return Eritrean deserters and Eritrea responded by firing at the Djiboutian forces. In the following battles, some 44 Djiboutian troops and some estimated 100 Eritreans were killed.

=== African Union Mission to Somalia ===
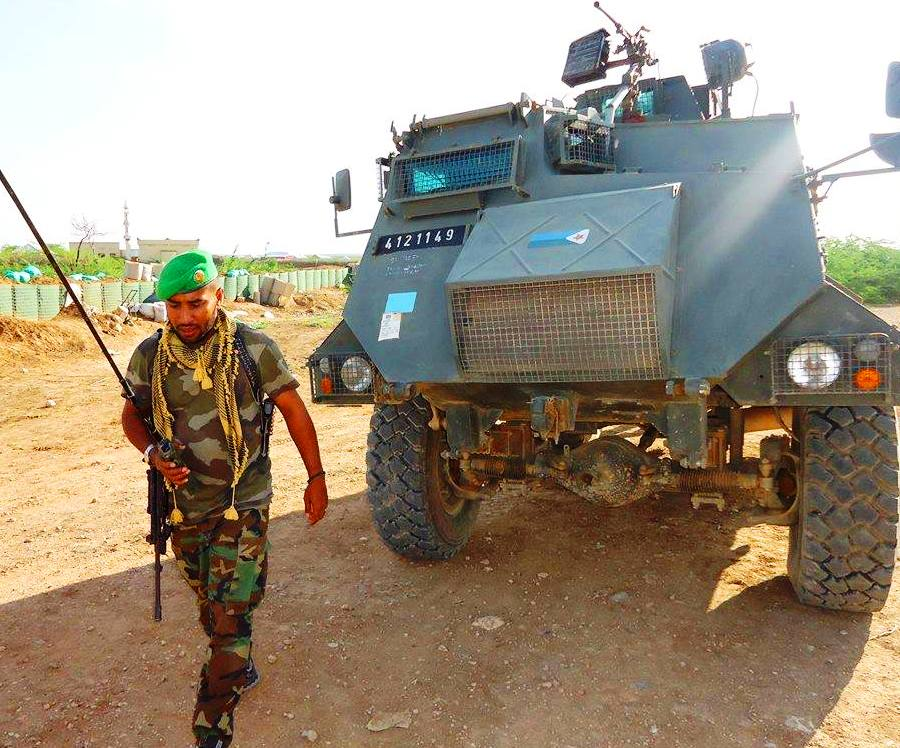
Djiboutian Soldier patrol the base in Beledweyne, Somalia.

In 2011, Djibouti troops also joined the African Union Mission to Somalia. Djibouti deployed troops to Somalia to fight Al-Shabaab forces and Al-Qaeda operatives, with the hopes of dismantling both groups to support the transitional governmental structures, implement a national security plan, train the Somali security forces, and to assist in creating a secure environment for the delivery of humanitarian aid. Djibouti's responsibilities include providing security in Hiran and Galguduud regions.

As of 2013, the Djibouti Armed Forces (DJAF) are composed of three branches: the Djibouti National Army, which consists of the Coastal Navy, the Djiboutian Air Force (Force Aerienne Djiboutienne, FAD), and the National Gendarmerie (GN). The Army is by far the largest, followed by the Air Force and Navy. The Commander-in-Chief of the DJAF is the President of Djibouti and the Minister of Defence oversees the DJAF on a day-to-day basis.

== Component forces and their organization ==
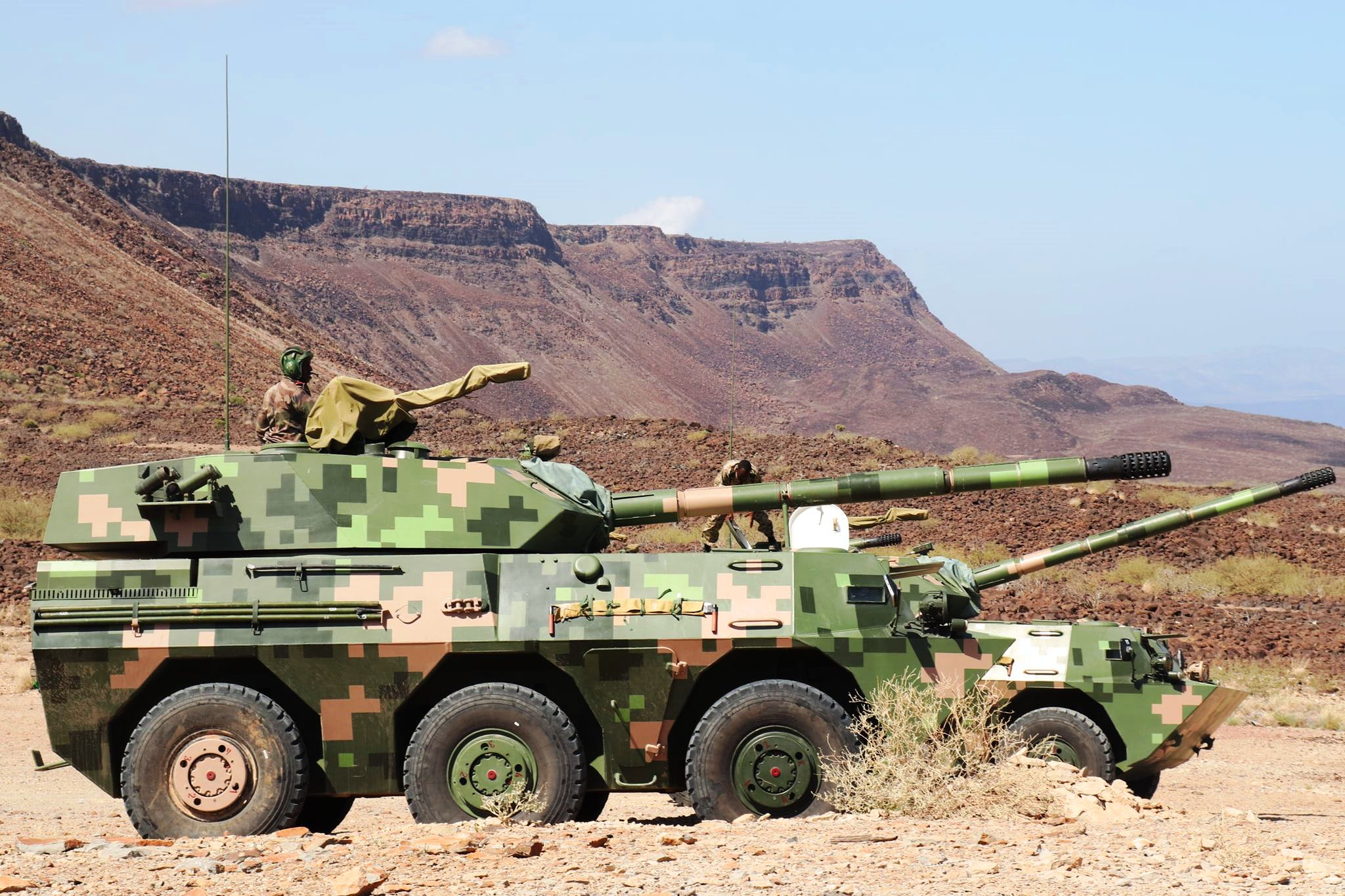
Djiboutian Army WMA-301 during a demonstration at Maryama base.

Refer to decree No 2003-0166/PR/MDN on organization of Djibouti Armed Forces. The armed forces consist of:

- The General Staff of the Armed Forces.
- A Defense Staff.
- An infantry force: one rapid action regiment, two paratrooper battalions, one combined arms regiment at Obock, one combined arms regiment at Tadjourah, one combined arms regiment in Dikhil, one combined arms battalion in Ali-Sabieh and one reinforced company in Damerjog.
- Specific forces and fire support: one armored regiment, one artillery regiment and one group of combat engineer.
- The Navy
- The Air Force
- The Schools Command.
- The Headquarters Regiment.
- The Central Material Directorate.
- The Health Service.

=== Djiboutian Army ===
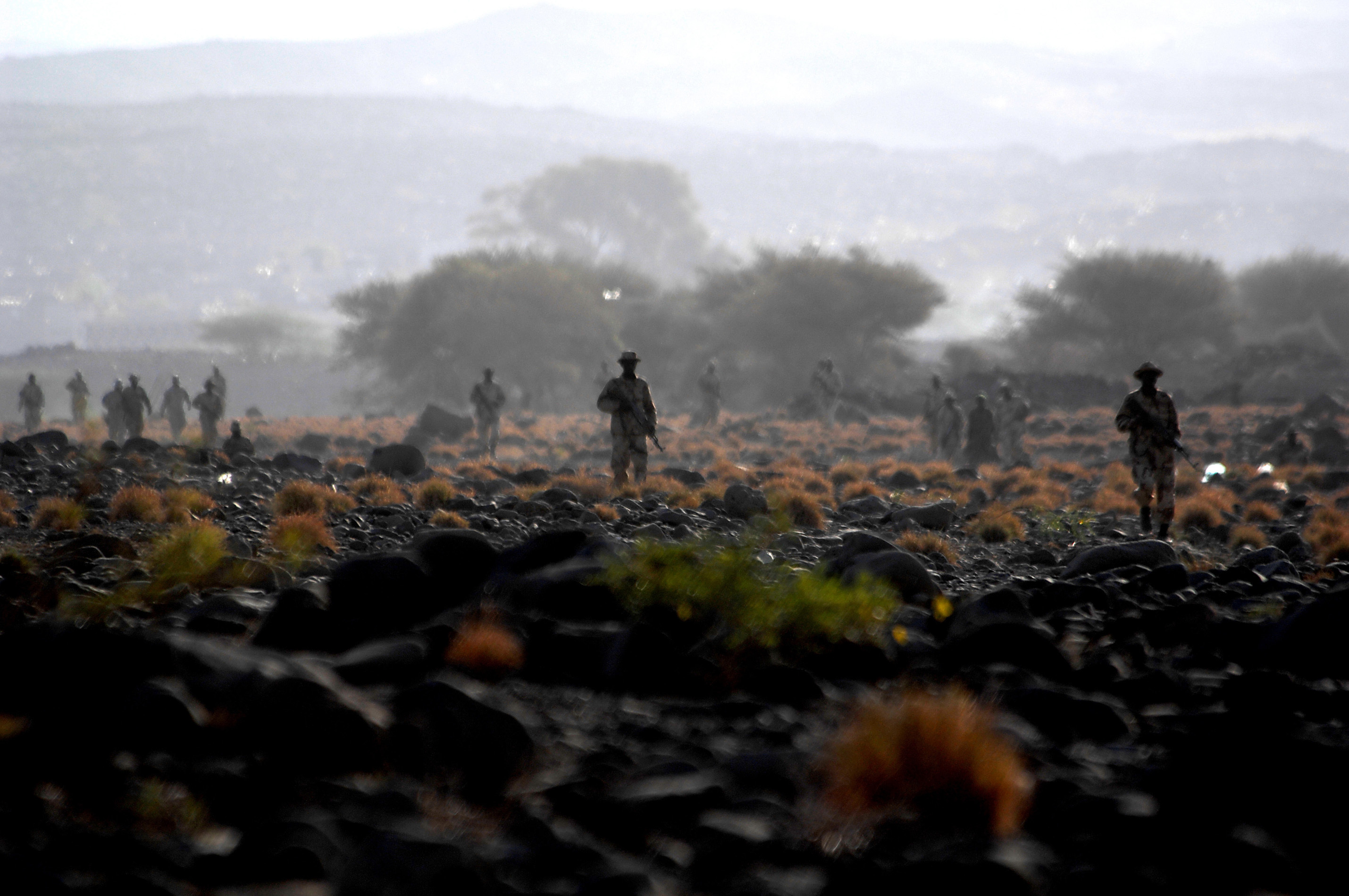
Djiboutian army soldiers conduct a patrol on the border.

The Djiboutian National Army (DNA) is the largest branch of the Djibouti Armed Forces. Just prior to independence in 1977, the French Territory of the Afars and the Issas established a national army to defend the Djiboutian's borders. The 6 June 1977 has since been marked as Armed Forces Day. After independence, the Front de Libération de la Côte des Somalis troops merged to form the 2,500 strong Djiboutian National Army. Djibouti maintains a modest military force of approximately 20,470 troops; the army is made of 18,600 troops (IISS 2018). The latter are divided into several regiments and battalions garrisoned in various areas throughout the country. The Army has four military districts (the Tadjourah, Dikhil, Ali-Sabieh and Obock districts). Clashes with the Military of Eritrea, in 2008, demonstrated the superior nature of the Djiboutian forces’ training and skills, but also highlighted the fact that the small military would be unable to counter the larger, if less well-equipped forces of its neighbours. The army has concentrated on mobility in its equipment purchases, suitable for patrol duties and counterattacks but ill-suited for armoured warfare. The 2008 border clashes at least temporarily swelled the ranks of the Djiboutian army, with retired personnel being recalled, but the military's size and capabilities are much reduced since the 1990s. The army to address more effectively its major defense disadvantage: lack of strategic depth. Thus in the early 2000s it looked outward for a model of army organization that would best advance defensive capabilities by restructuring forces into smaller, more mobile units instead of traditional divisions. The official tasks of the armed forces include strengthening the country against external attack, and maintaining border security. Djiboutian troops continue to monitor its borders with Eritrea, in the case of an attack. The Djiboutian Army is one of the small professional advanced armies in East Africa.

Djiboutian Army Infantry Regiments

Its maneuver units are:

- One armoured regiment (comprising a reconnaissance squadron, three armoured squadrons and an anti-smuggling squadron)
- Four infantry regiments (each comprising three to four infantry companies and a support company)
  - Regiment interarmées de Tadjourah
  - Regiment interarmees de Obock
  - Two other infantry regiments
- One rapid reaction regiment (comprising four infantry companies and a support company)
- One Republican Guard regiment
- One artillery regiment
- One demining company
- One signals regiment
- One computer and information systems section
- One logistics regiment
- One maintenance company

Italy delivered 10 M-109L howitzers in 2013, various IVECO support trucks (ACM90s, cranes, tankers, etc.), some IVECO Puma 4X4 armoured cars and IVECO VM90 utility vehicles.

In reforming the Djiboutian Army, most of the available financial resources have been directed to the development of the Land Forces. Over the years, Djiboutian Army has established partnerships with militaries in France, Egypt, Saudi Arabia, Morocco and the United States. Currently, the amount allocated to defense represents the largest single entry in the country's budget.

=== Djiboutian National Gendarmerie ===
The Djiboutian National Gendarmerie is the national Gendarmerie force of Djibouti, tasked with high-risk and specialized law enforcement duties. It is one of the two main police forces in Djibouti (the other being the Djiboutian Police - a civilian force), both having jurisdiction over the civilian population. It is a branch of the Djiboutian Armed Forces placed under the jurisdiction of the Ministry of the Interior—with additional duties to the Ministry of Defense. Its area of responsibility includes smaller towns, rural and suburban areas.

=== Djiboutian Navy ===
The Djiboutian Navy (DN) is the naval service branch of the Djibouti Armed Forces. The force was launched two years after Djibouti gained its independence in 1977. It is responsible for securing Djibouti's territorial waters and 314-kilometre (195 mi) seaboard as well as supporting army operations. The primary objective of the navy is to safeguard the nation's maritime borders, act to deter or defeat any threats or aggression against the territory, people or maritime interests of Djibouti, both in war and peace. Through joint exercises and humanitarian missions, including disaster relief, the Djiboutian Navy promotes bilateral relations between nations. It has a fleet of gunboats, fast missile boats and support, training, which can be deployed to defend the territorial waters and coastline of Djibouti as well as protect tankers passing through the Bab-el-Mandeb strait. The acquisition of the several boats from the US in 2006 considerably increased the navy's ability to patrol over longer distances and to remain at sea for several days at a time. Cooperation with the US and Yemeni navies is also increasing in an effort to protect and maintain the safety and security of the Sea Lanes of Communication (SLOC). The Navy is upgrading itself with the following technological developments.

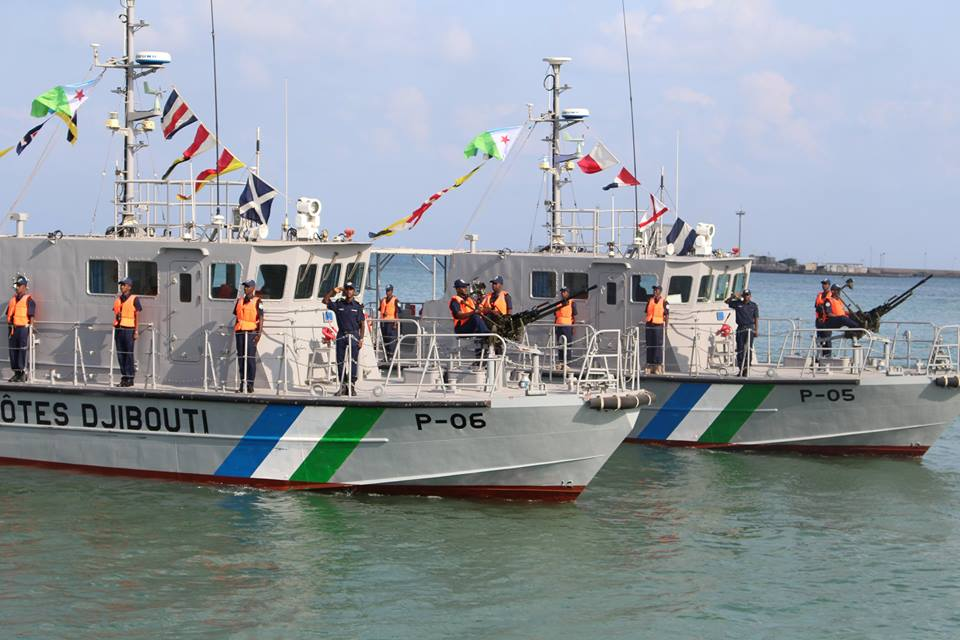
Djiboutian Coast Guard vessels gathered at the port in Djibouti City for a celebration on 17 January 2018

=== Djiboutian Coast Guard ===
The Djiboutian Coast Guard (DCG) (French: Garde-Côtes Djiboutienne GCD), is the coast guard of Djibouti is a division of the Djiboutian Navy responsible for protecting the interests of the Republic of Djibouti at sea. Formed in 2011, the coast guard is tasked with such as illegal fishing and exploitation of natural resources, search and rescue (SAR), protection of ecology, fishing, marine pollution, ballast waters, combat against terrorism, trafficking of people, narcotics, and similar. Like many other coast guards, it is a paramilitary organization that can support the Djiboutian Navy in wartime, but resides under separate civilian control in times of peace. The Coast Guard monitor vessels sailing in the Djiboutian territorial waters. The Djiboutian Coast Guard intercepted refugee and migrant boats travelling across the Bab-el-Mandeb.

=== Djiboutian Air Force ===
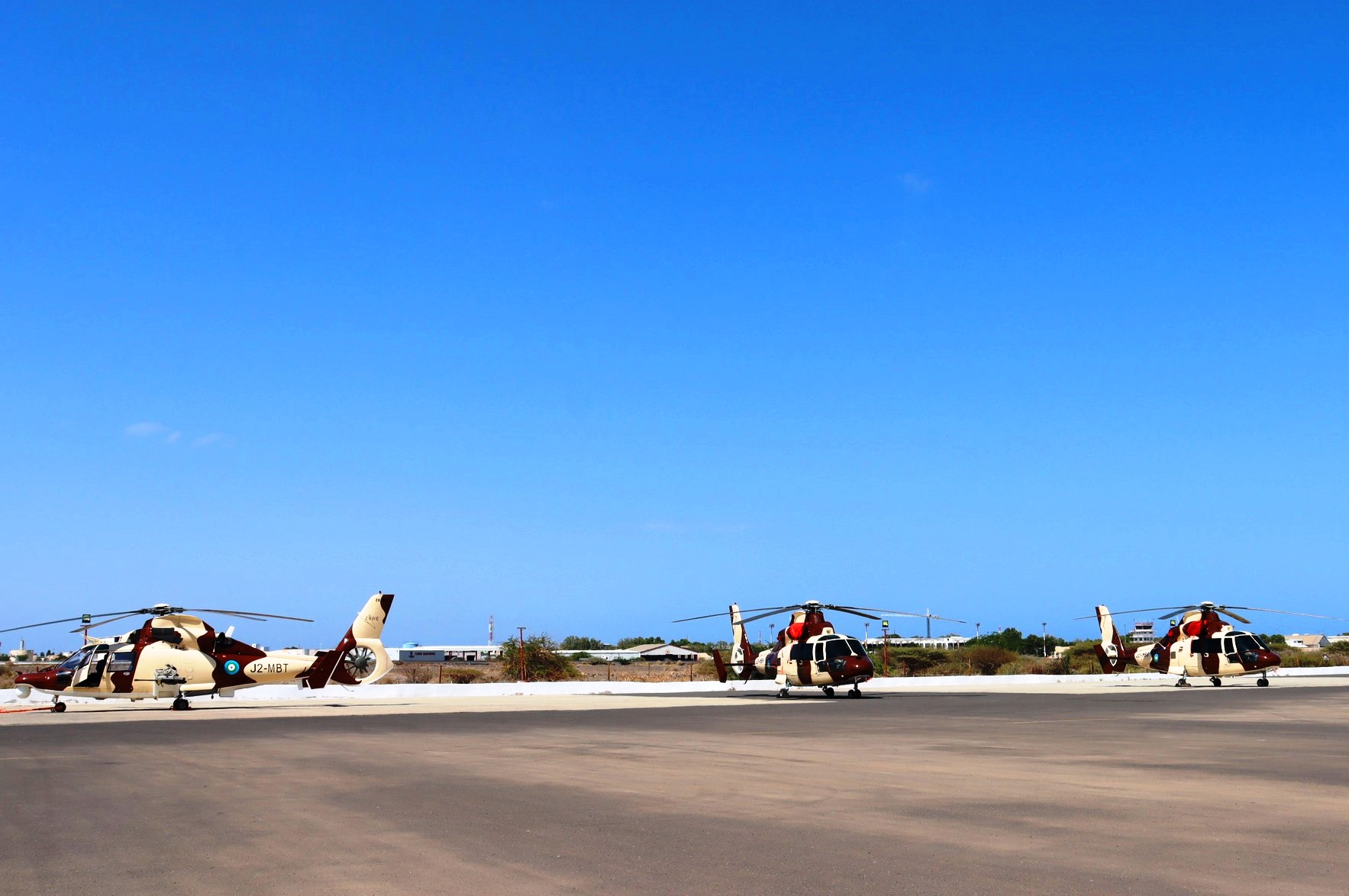
Djiboutian Air Force helicopters on display at Djibouti–Ambouli International Airport.

The Djiboutian Air Force (DAF) (French: Force Aérienne du Djibouti (FADD)) was established as part of the Djibouti Armed Forces after the country obtained its independence on June 27, 1977. Its first aircraft included three Nord N.2501 Noratlas transport aircraft and an Alouette II helicopter presented to it by the French. In 1982, the Djibouti Air Force was augmented by two Aerospatiale AS.355F Ecureuil 2 helicopters and a Cessna U206G Stationair, this was followed in 1985 by a Cessna 402C Utiliner. In 1985, the Alouette II was withdrawn from use and put on display at Ambouli Air Base at Djibouti's airport. In 1987, the three N.2501 Noratlas were also retired and subsequently returned to France. New equipment came, in 1991, in the form of a Cessna 208 Caravan, followed by Russian types in the early nineties. These included four Mil Mi 2, six Mil Mi 8 and two Mil Mi 17 helicopters and a single Antonov An 28 light transport aircraft. Pilot training for the 360 men of the DAF, if necessary, is conducted in France with continued on type flight training at home. The DAF has no units of its own and forms in whole a part of the Army, its sole base is Ambouli.

=== Doctrine ===
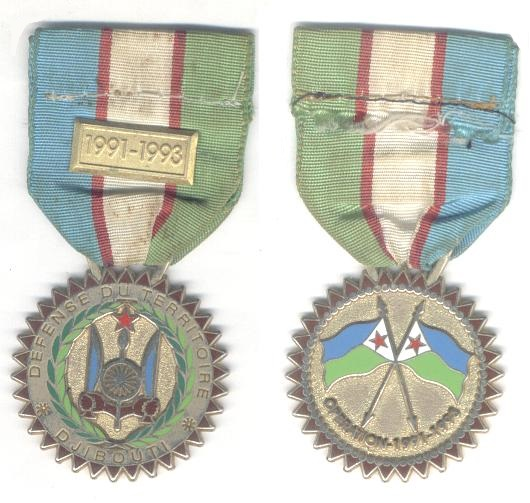
The Homeland Defense Medal's was awarded to Djiboutian forces for duties related to the Djiboutian Civil War raids between 1991 and 1993.

The main doctrine consists of the following principles:

- Djibouti cannot afford to lose a war
- A small standing army with good capabilities.
- Desire to avoid war by political means.

=== Personnel ===
The size and structure of the Djibouti Armed Forces is continually evolving.

Historical personnel of the Djibouti Armed Forces
	Republic of Djibouti									
	1977	1979	1982	1985	1989	1992	1998	2000	2007	2015
Regular	2,800	4,000	6,800	8,000	9,000	20,000	13,000	12,900	10,500	16,000
Army Reserve		1,000	1,500	2,200	4,000	500	4,500	6,000	8,000	9,500
Total	2,800	5,000	8,200	10,200	13,000	20,500	17,500	18,900	18,500	25,500

As of 2018, Djibouti Armed Forces were reported to have 18,000–20,000 active personnel, 10,500–11,000 reserve personnel.

Component	in service	Reserve
Djiboutian Army	18,600	11,000
Djiboutian Air Force	370	220
Djiboutian Navy	1,500	1,000
Totals	20,470	12,220

== UN peacekeeping forces ==

Djibouti's first UN Peacekeeping mission was in 1994, when it deployed uniformed personnel to the UN Mission in Haiti (UNMIH) and the UN Assistance Mission for Rwanda (UNAMIR). Djibouti UN peacekeeping mission in the Darfur, Sudan in 2010, withdrew their personnel from Sudan on the 30 June 2021. Djibouti has committed to strengthening international action through the African Union to achieve collective security and uphold the goals enshrined in the Purposes and Principles of the UN Charter and the Constitutive Act of the African Union. Deployed in 3 countries in Somalia, Democratic Republic of the Congo and Central African Republic.

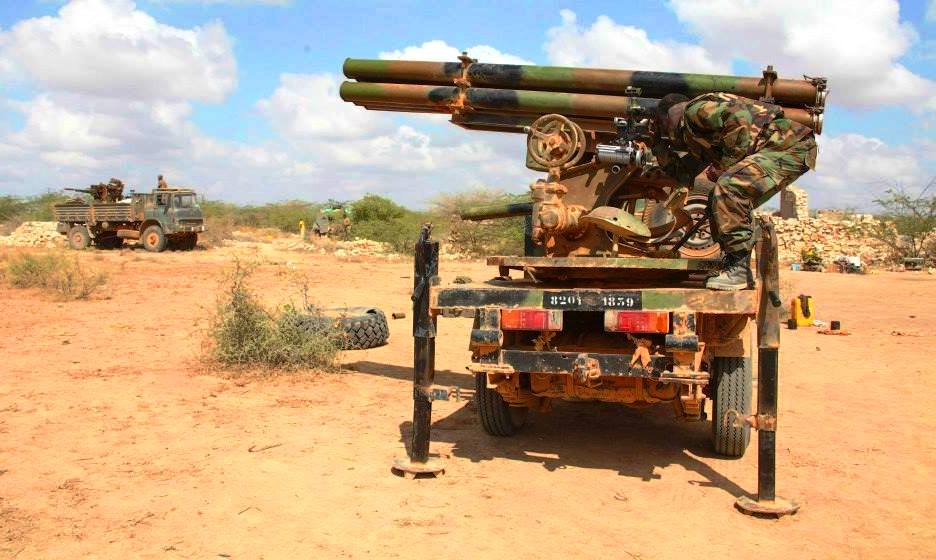
Djiboutian forces artillery ready to fire on Al-Shabaab militants near the town of Buloburde, Somalia.

The table below shows the current deployment of Djiboutian Forces in UN Peacekeeping missions.

Name of Operation	Location		Conflict	Contribution
United Nations Organization Mission in the Democratic Republic of the Congo (MONUC)	(Democratic Republic of the Congo)	Democratic Republic of Congo	Second Congo War	35 Troops.
United Nations Multidimensional Integrated Stabilization Mission in the Central African Republic (MINUSCA)	(Central African Republic)	Central African Republic	Central African Republic Civil War	195 Troops.
African Union Transition Mission in Somalia (ATMIS)	(Somalia)	Federal Republic of Somalia	Somali Civil War	3,500 Troops.

== Foreign military within Djibouti ==
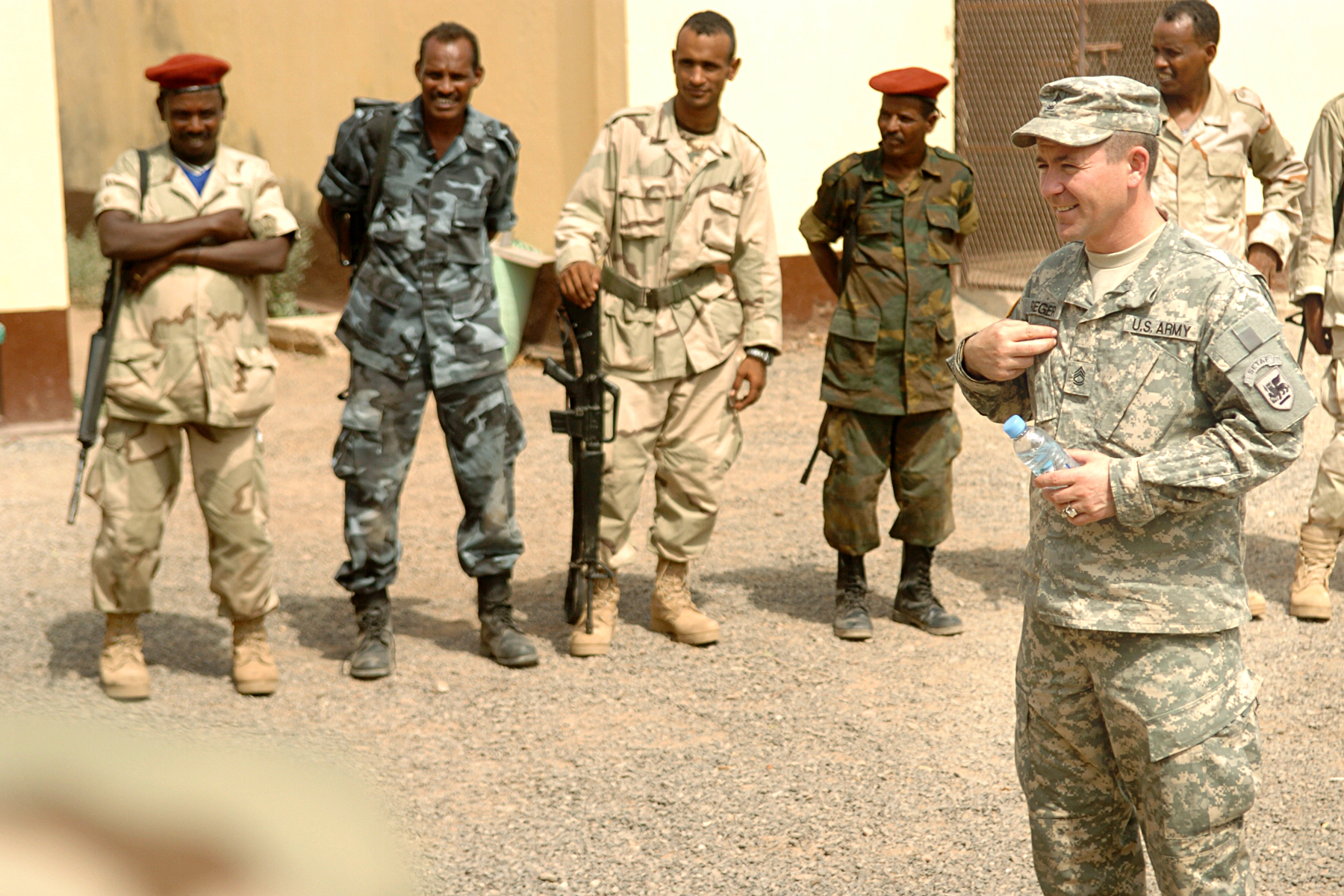
Djibouti troops in first responder course with United States Army soldiers.

The extreme closeness of various bases would make it a flashpoint in a conflict.

France

France's 5e RIAOM are currently stationed in Djibouti.

=== Italy ===
The Italian Base Militare Nazionale di Supporto (National Support Military Base) is capable to host 300 troops and some UAVs.

The Italian Military Support Base in Djibouti, established in 2013, monitors commercial traffic, addresses piracy, and supports counter-terrorism and military operations in the Horn of Africa, Gulf of Aden, and Indian Ocean.

=== United States ===
There is also Combined Joint Task Force - Horn of Africa, a U.S. force of more than 3,500, currently deployed in the country at Camp Lemonnier.

=== Japan ===
The Japan Self-Defense Force Base Djibouti was established in 2011. The Deployment Airforce for Counter-Piracy Enforcement (DAPE): Established in 2011 with approximately 600 deployed personnel from the Japan Maritime Self-Defense Force, on a rotational basis, operating naval vessels and maritime patrol aircraft. Japan reportedly pays $30 million per year for the military facilities, from which it conducts anti-piracy operations in the region. The base also acts as a hub for operations throughout the East African coastline.

=== China ===
The Chinese naval support base in Djibouti began construction in 2016 and was officially opened in 2017.
