= Military ranks of Djibouti =

The Military ranks of Djibouti are the military insignia used by the Djibouti Armed Forces.

== Commissioned officer ranks ==
The rank insignia of commissioned officers.

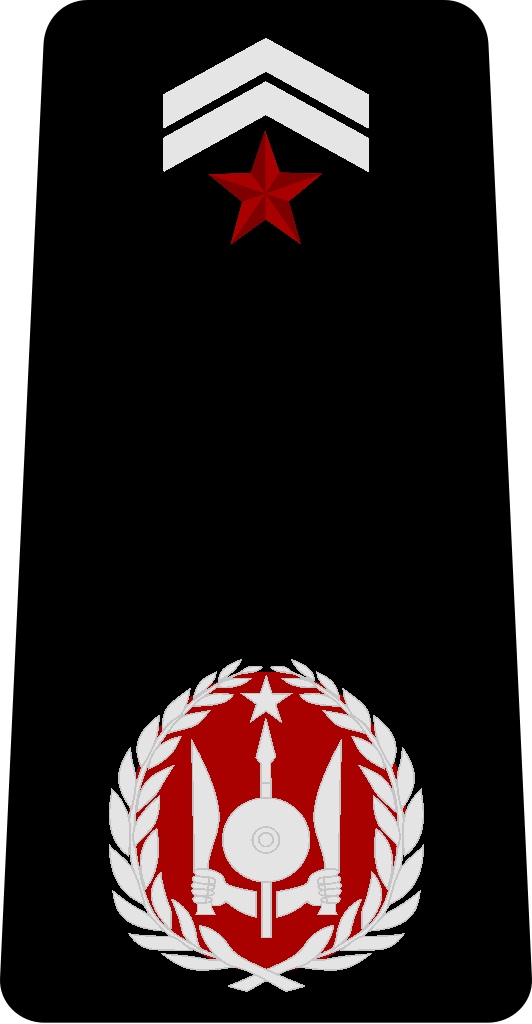
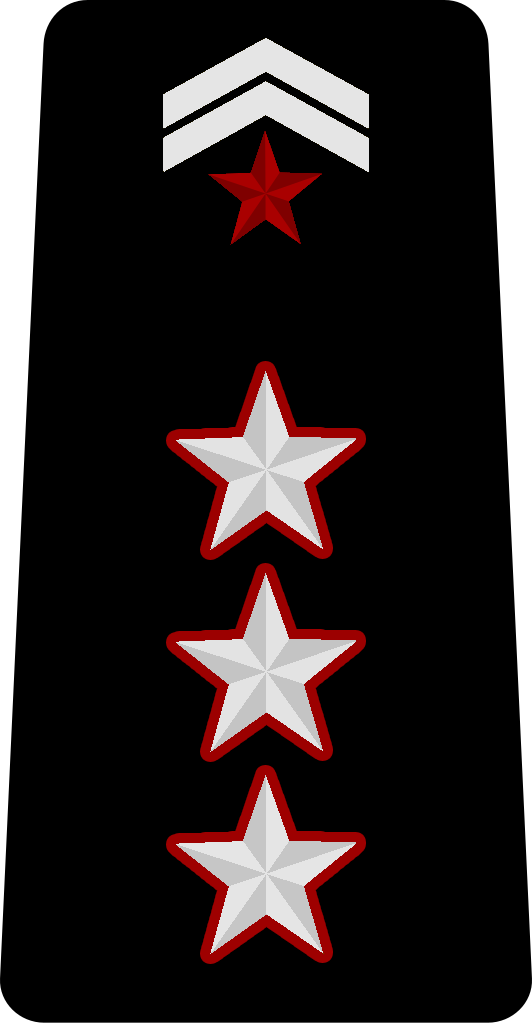
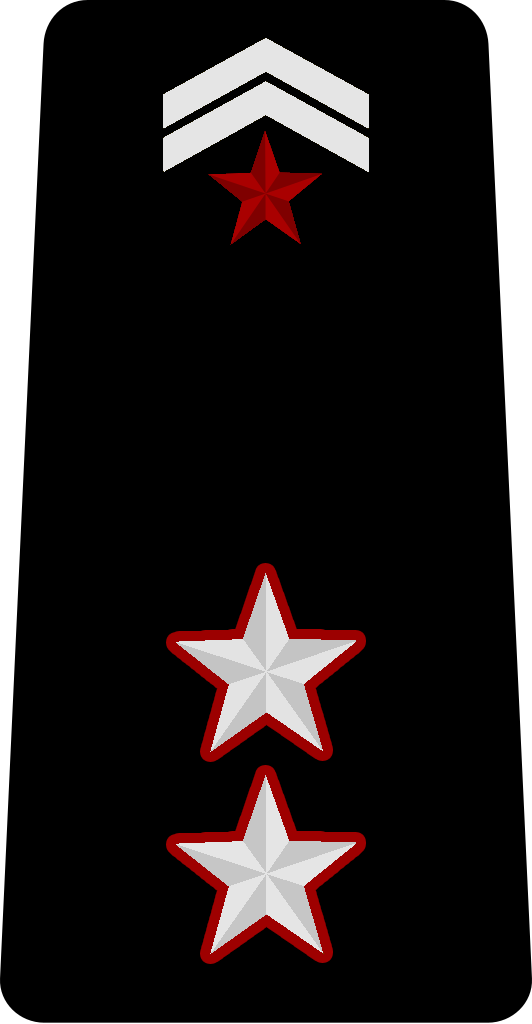
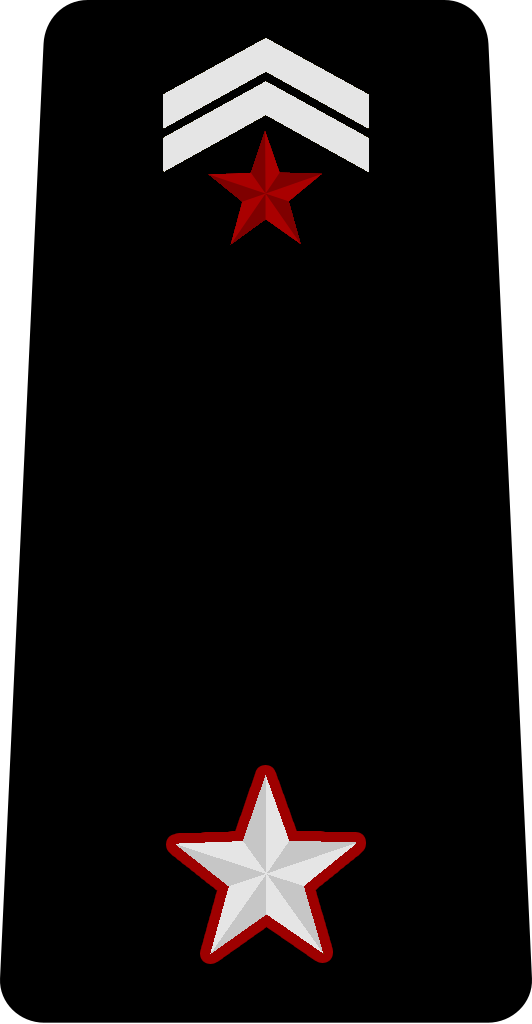
Rank group	General / flag officers		Senior officers				Junior officers
Djiboutian Army
Djiboutian Army	Général de division	Général de brigade	Colonel-major	Colonel	Lieutenant-colonel	Commandant	Capitaine	Lieutenant	Sous-lieutenant
Djiboutian Navy
Djiboutian Navy		Général de brigade	Colonel-major	Colonel	Lieutenant-colonel	Commandant	Capitaine	Lieutenant	Sous-lieutenant
Djibouti Air Force
Djibouti Air Force		Général de brigade	Colonel-major	Colonel	Lieutenant-colonel	Commandant	Capitaine	Lieutenant	Sous-lieutenant
(Djibouti) Djiboutian National Gendarmerie
(Djibouti) Djiboutian National Gendarmerie		Général de brigade	Colonel-major	Colonel	Lieutenant-colonel	Chef d'escadron	Capitaine	Lieutenant	Sous-lieutenant
(Djibouti) Djiboutian Republican Guard
(Djibouti) Djiboutian Republican Guard		Général de brigade	Colonel-major	Colonel	Lieutenant-colonel	Commandant	Capitaine	Lieutenant	Sous-lieutenant
Rank group	General / flag officers		Senior officers				Junior officers

== Other ranks ==
The rank insignia of non-commissioned officers and enlisted personnel.

Rank group	Senior NCOs					Junior NCOs		Enlisted
Djiboutian Army
Djiboutian Army	Major	Adjudant-chef	Adjudant	Sergent-chef	Sergent	Caporal-chef	Caporal	Soldat de 1^{ère} classe	Soldat de 2^{ème} classe
Djiboutian Navy
Djiboutian Navy	Major	Maître-principal	Premier maître	Maître	Second maître	Quartier-maitre se 1^{ère} classe	Quartier-maitre se 2^{ème} classe	Matelot se 1^{ère} classe	Matelot de 2^{ème} classe
Djibouti Air Force
Djibouti Air Force	Major	Adjudant-chef	Adjudant	Sergent-chef	Sergent	Caporal-chef	Caporal	Soldat de 1^{ère} classe	Soldat de 2^{ème} classe
(Djibouti) Djiboutian National Gendarmerie
(Djibouti) Djiboutian National Gendarmerie	Major	Adjudant-chef	Adjudant	Marechal des Logis-chef	Gendarme principal	Gendarme de 1^{ère} classe	Gendarme de 2^{ème} classe		Elève gendarme
Rank group	Senior NCOs					Junior NCOs		Enlisted
