= Comparative gendarmerie officer ranks of Francophone countries =

Rank comparison chart of officers for gendarmeries of Francophone states. In France and some Francophone nations, the gendarmerie is a branch of the armed forces that is responsible for internal security in parts of the territory (primarily in rural areas and small towns in the case of France), with additional duties as military police for the armed forces. In the mid-twentieth century, a number of former French mandates and colonial possessions adopted gendarmeries after independence.

== History ==
Through the French colonial empire the gendarmerie was employed as a military and policing force throughout French colonies, with Gendarmes from France being deployed in every colony in 1900. The gendarmerie would also recruit personnel from the local populations, entrenching the idea of a gendarmerie in the colonial societies.

In the mid-twentieth century, a number of former French mandates and colonial possessions adopted gendarmeries after independence. These included Algeria, Chad, Djibouti, the Ivory Coast, Lebanon, Madagascar, Morocco, Senegal, Syria, Tunisia, and the Republic of the Congo.

== Officers ==
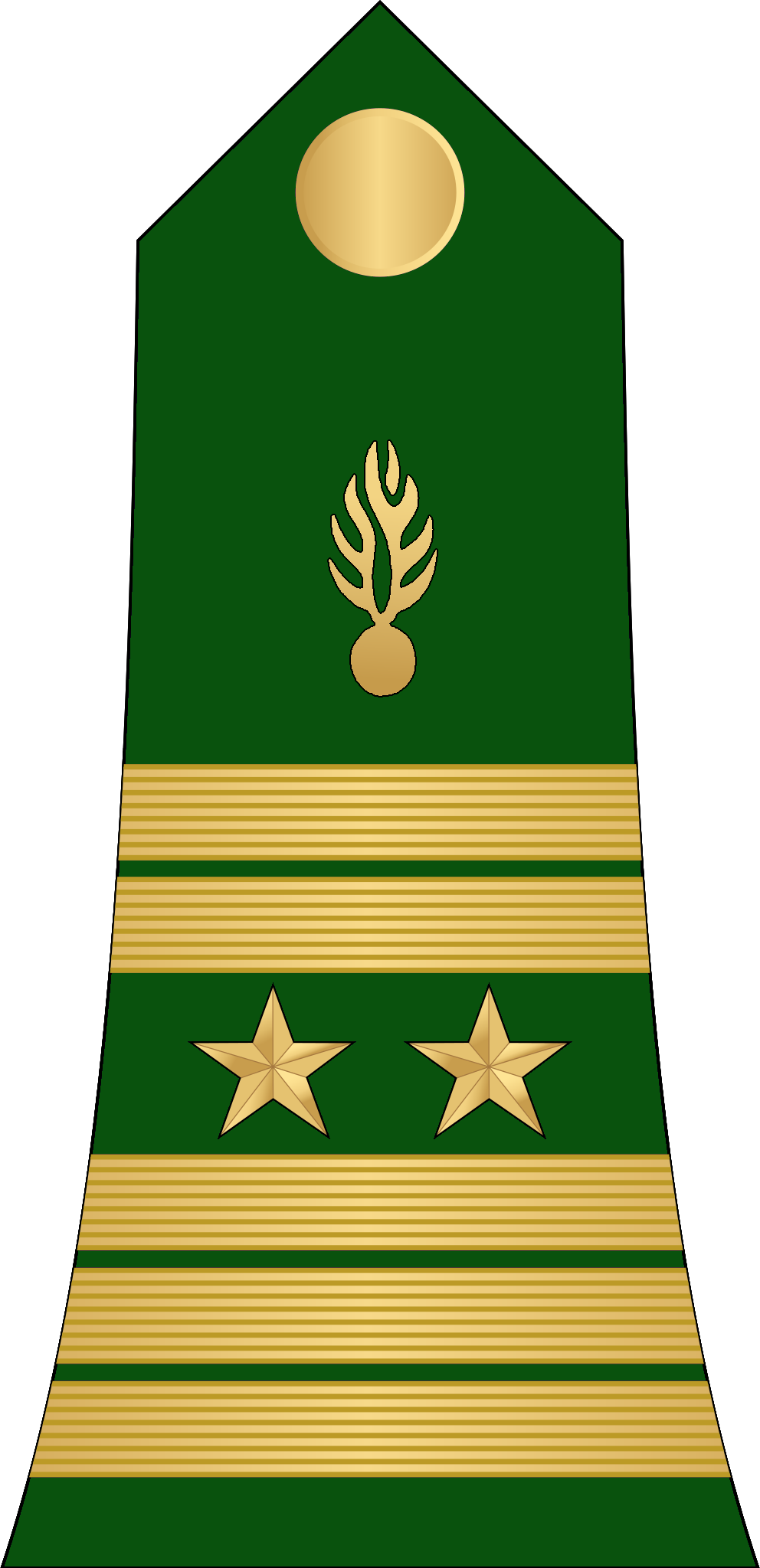
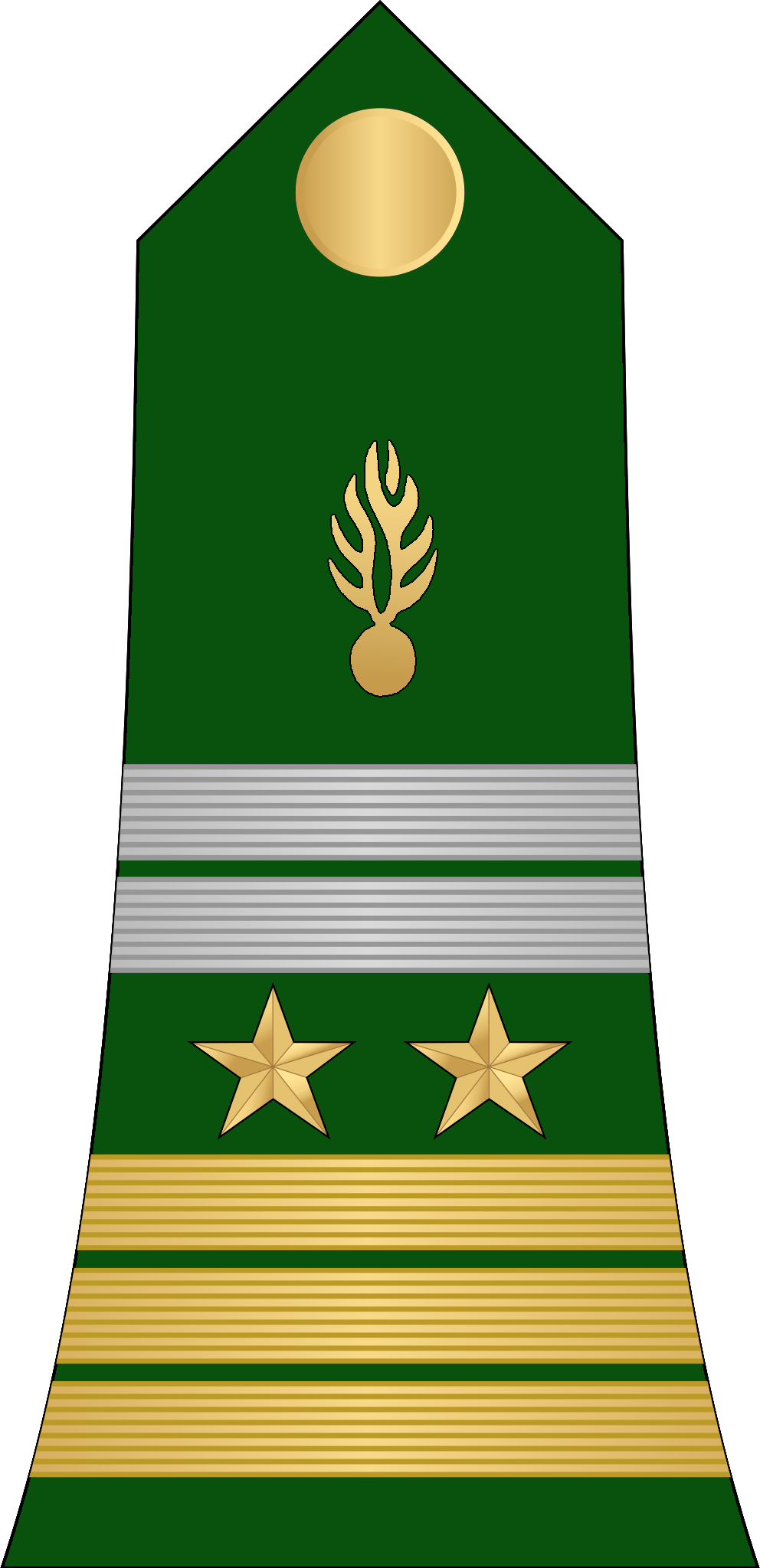
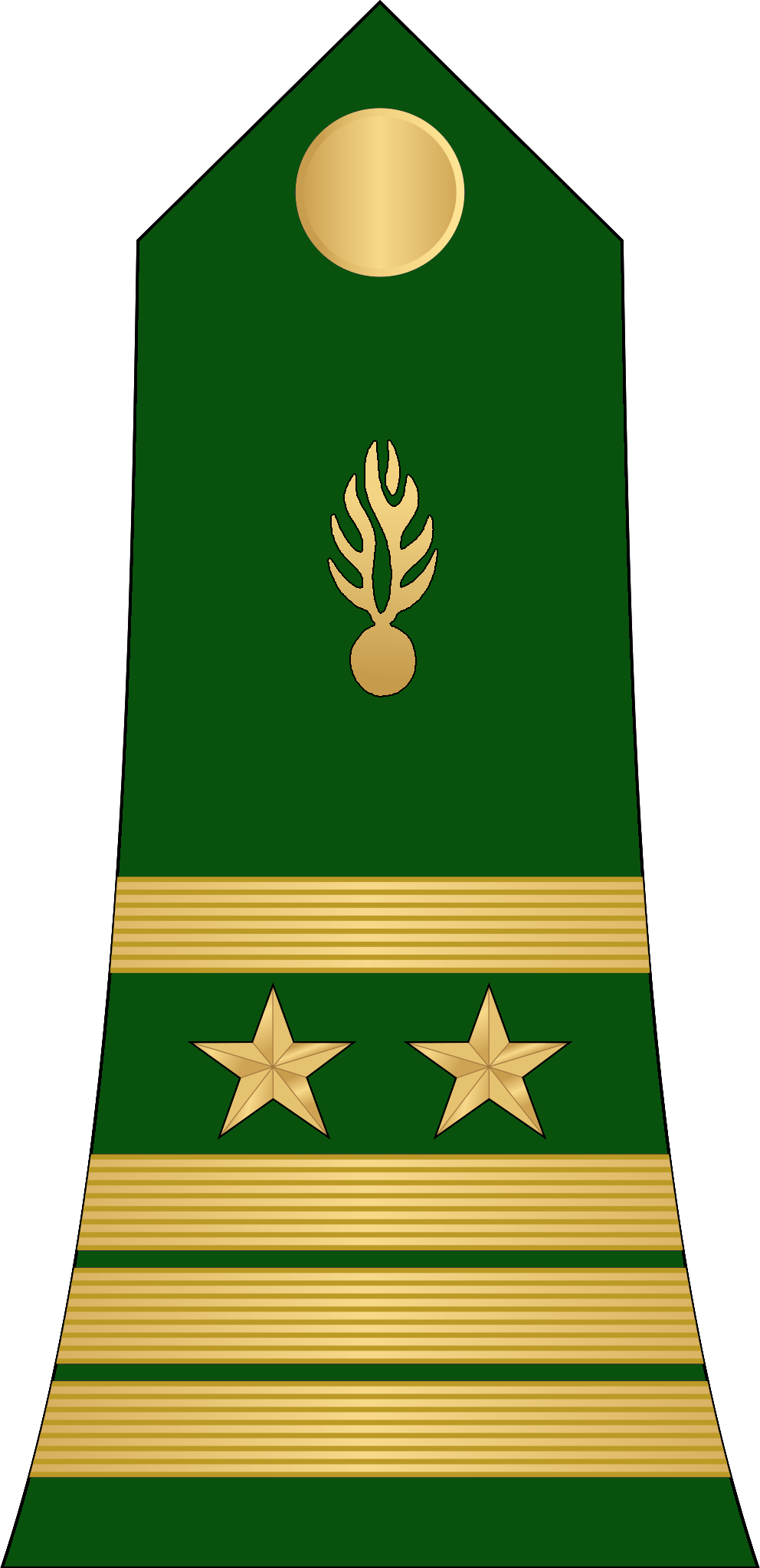
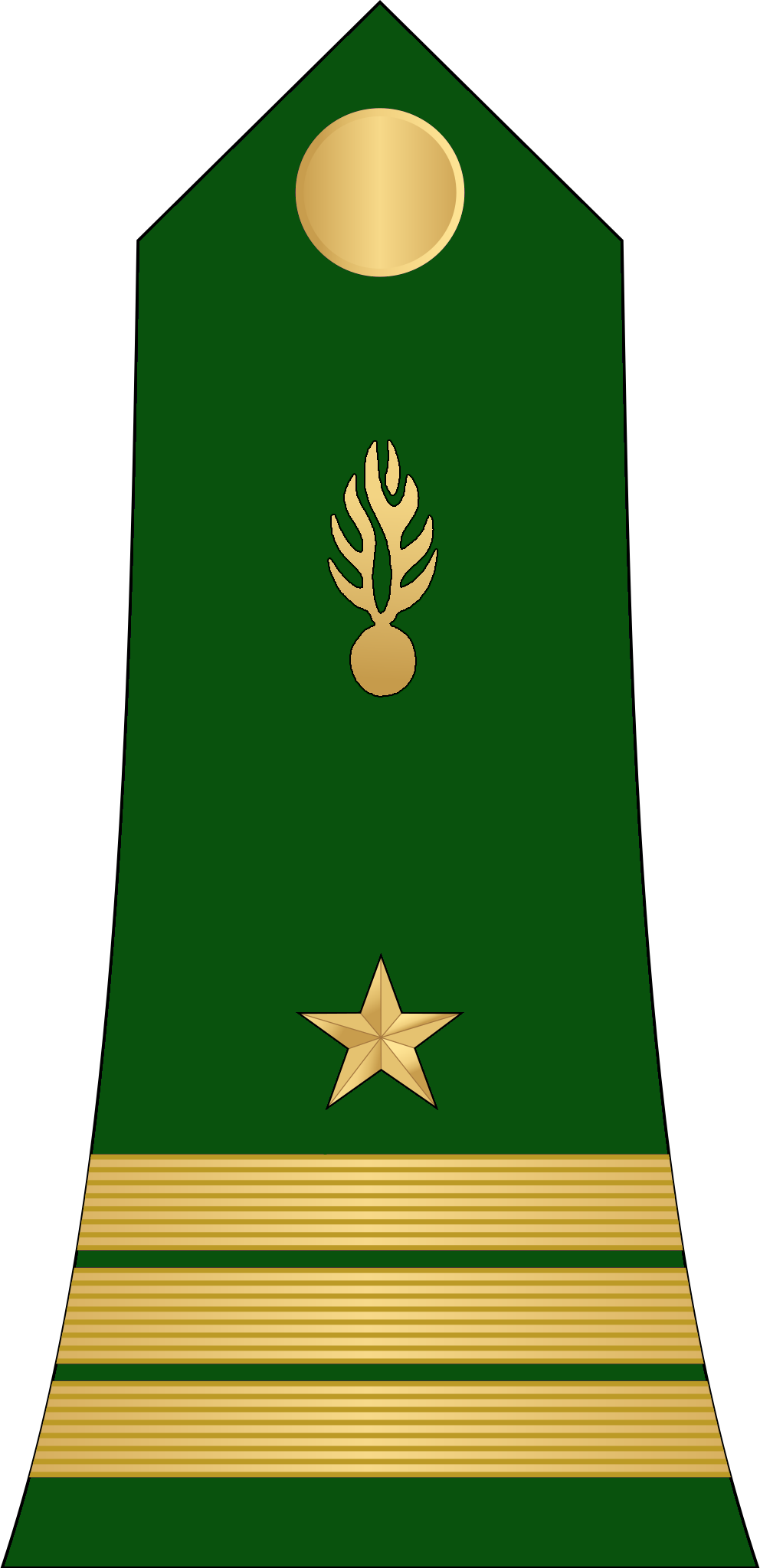
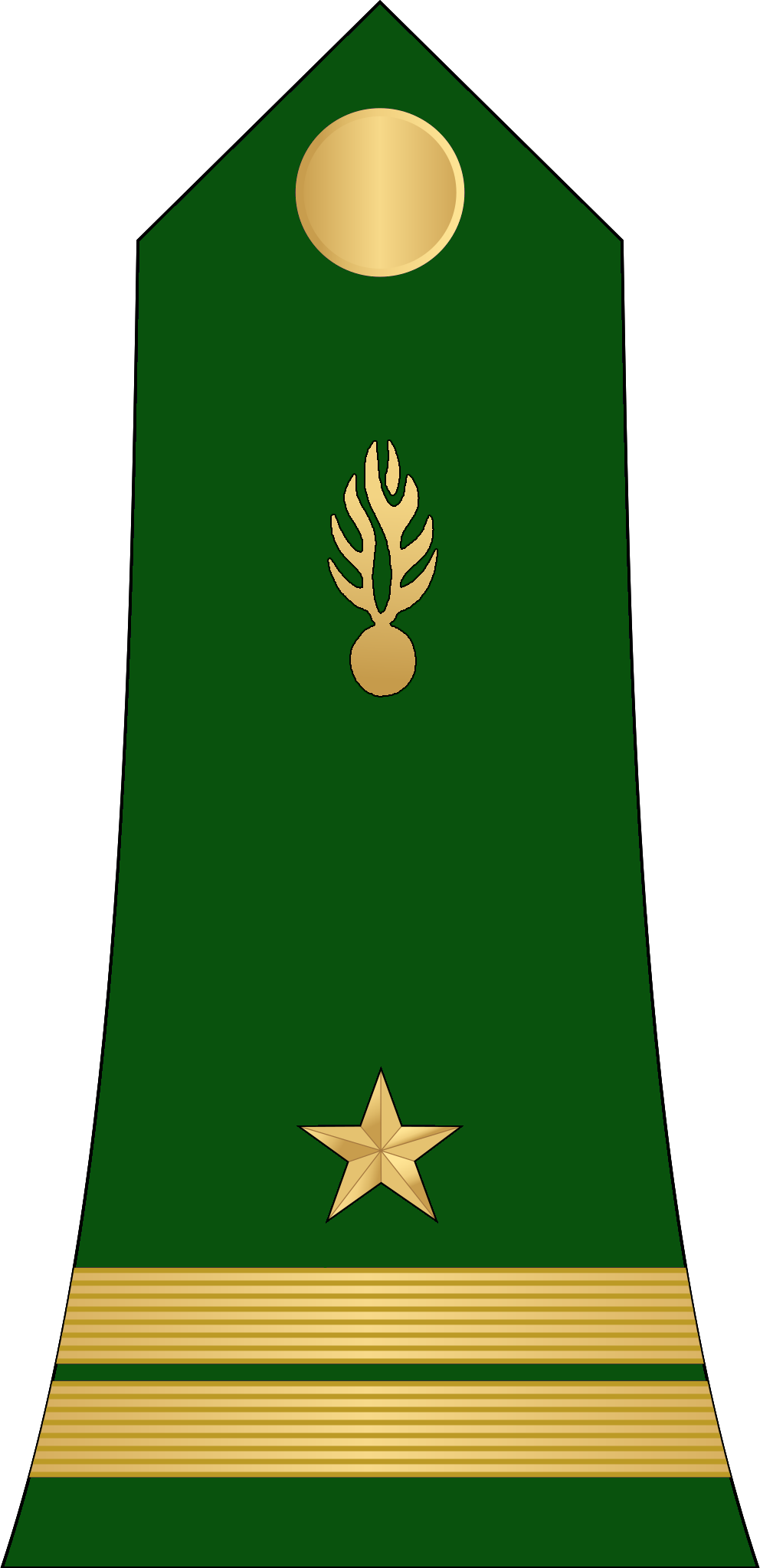
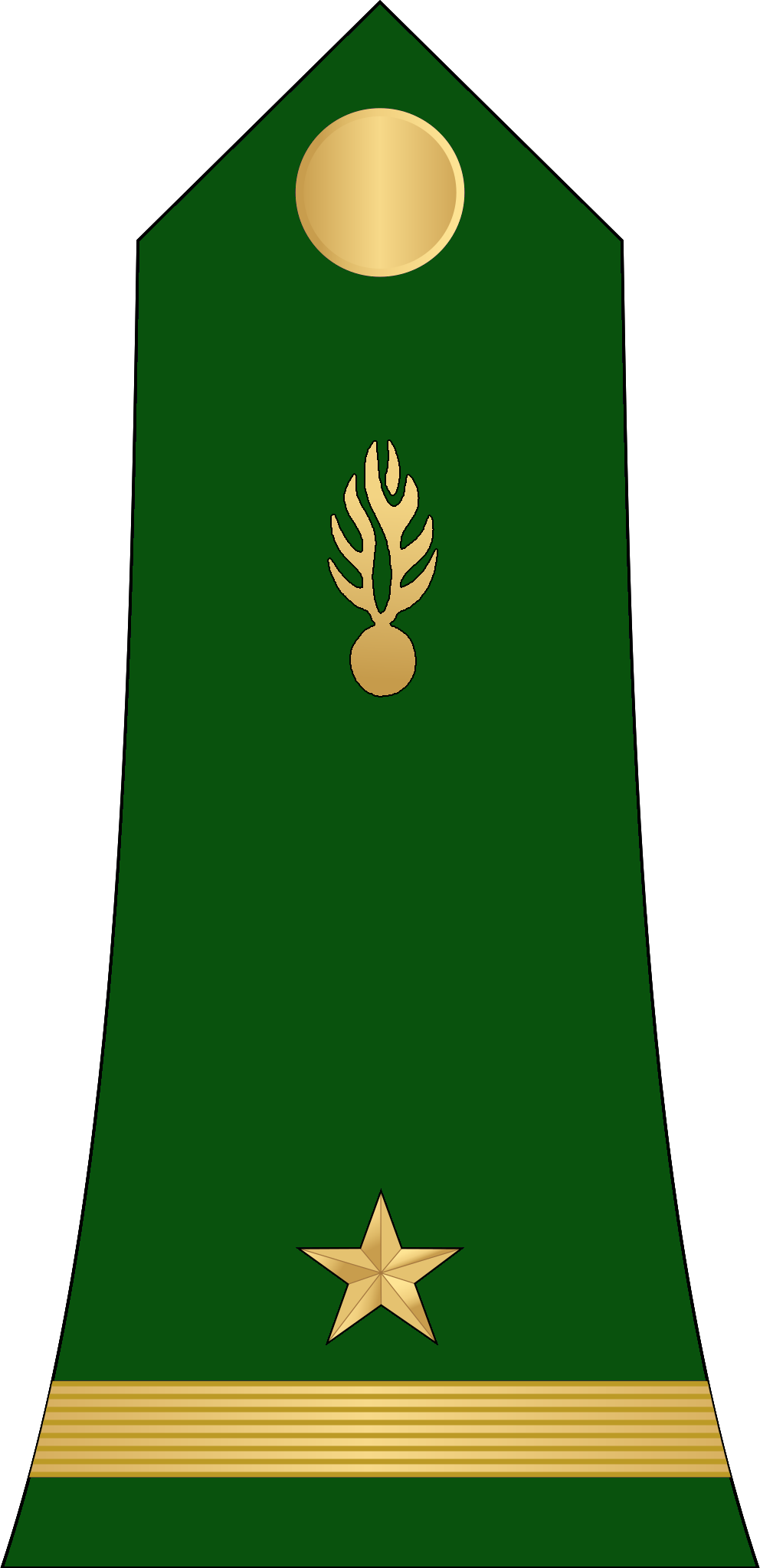
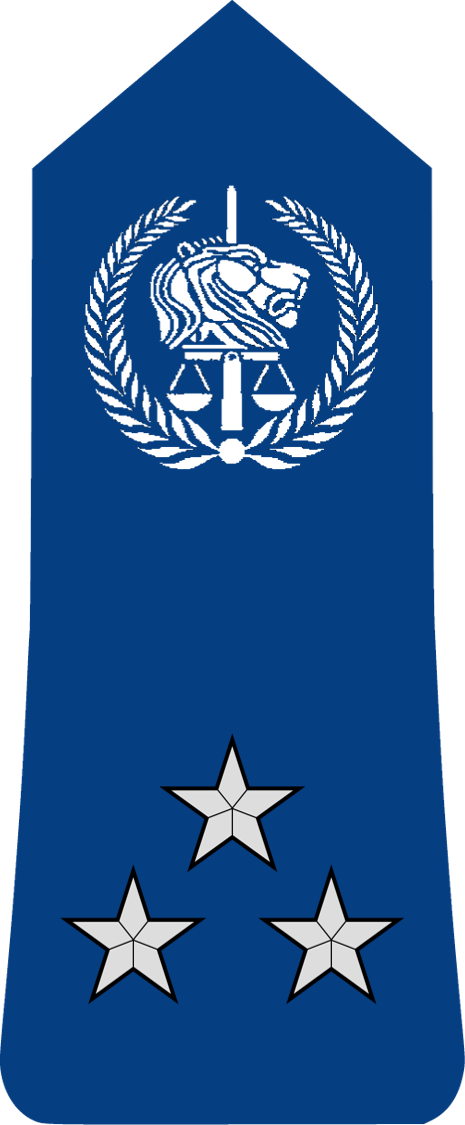
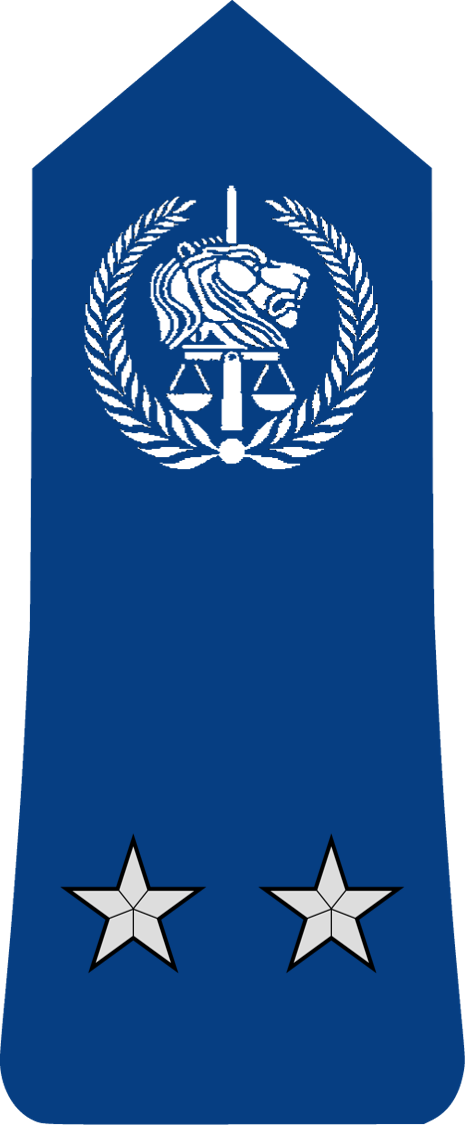
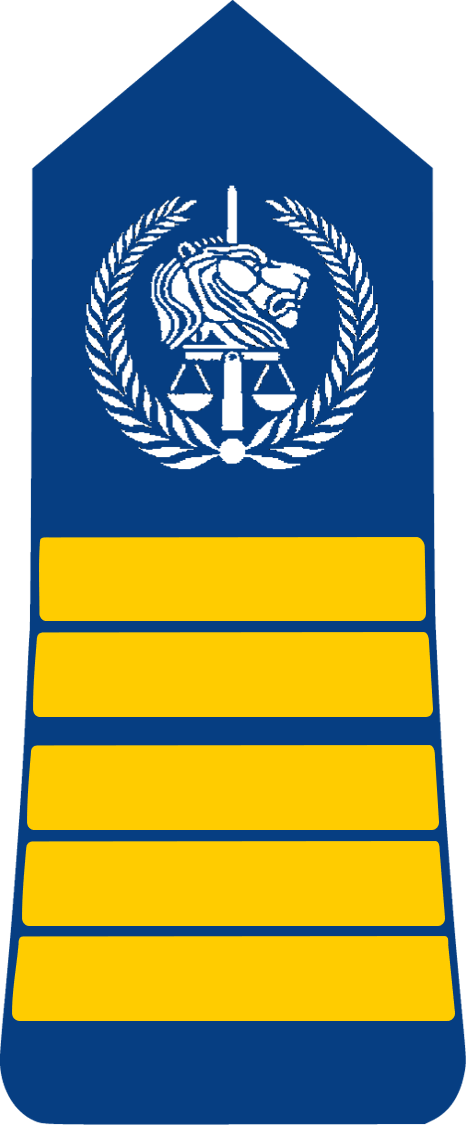
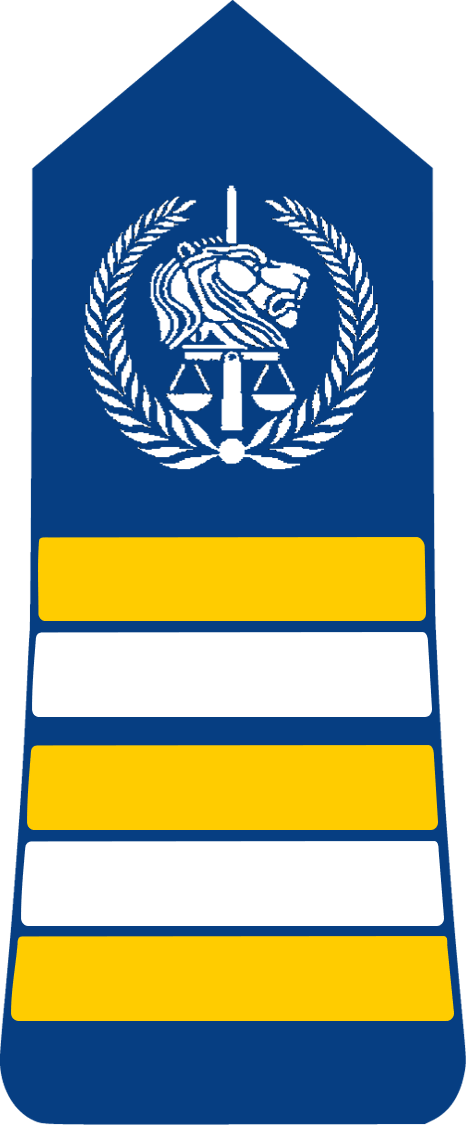
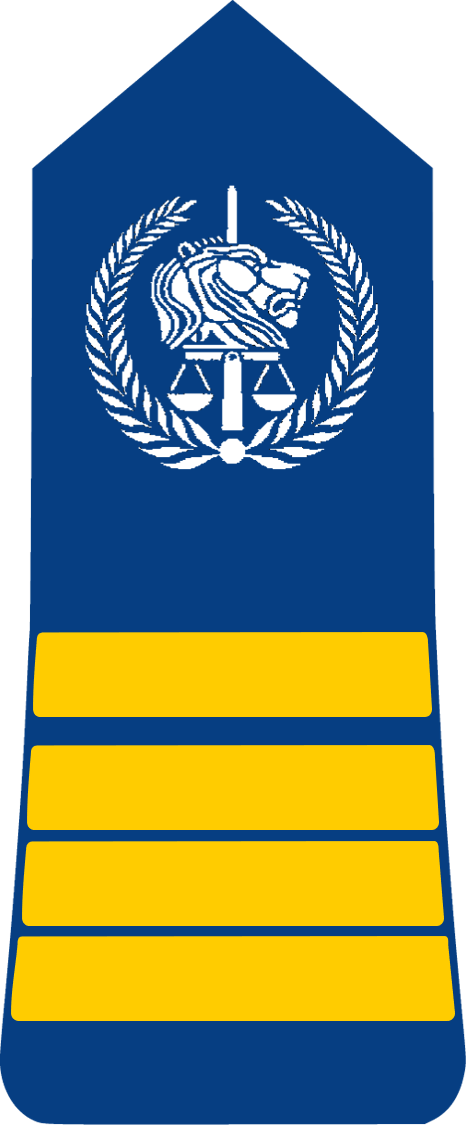
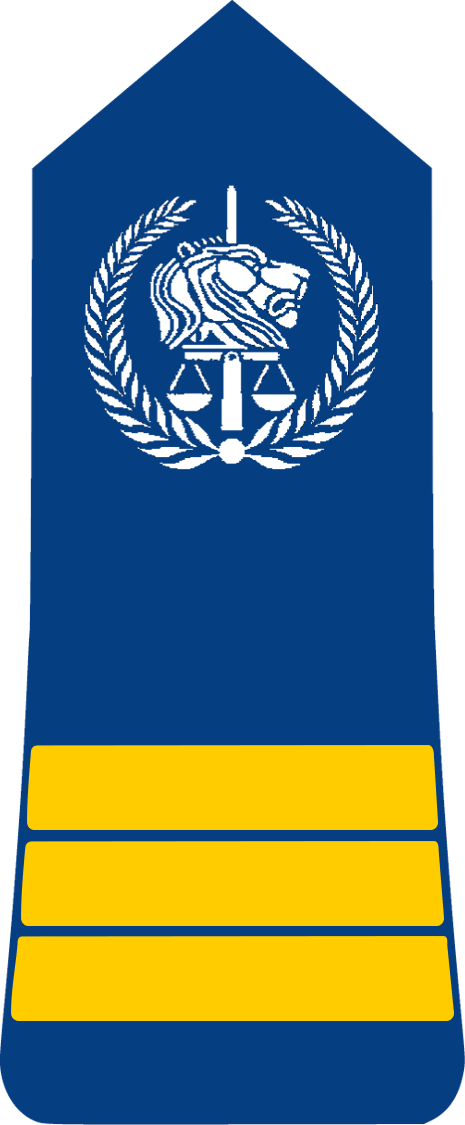
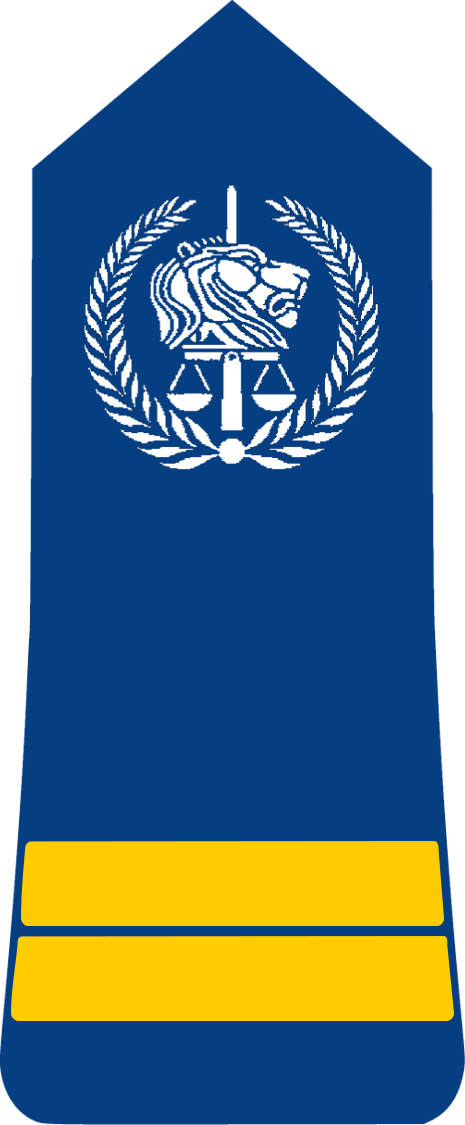
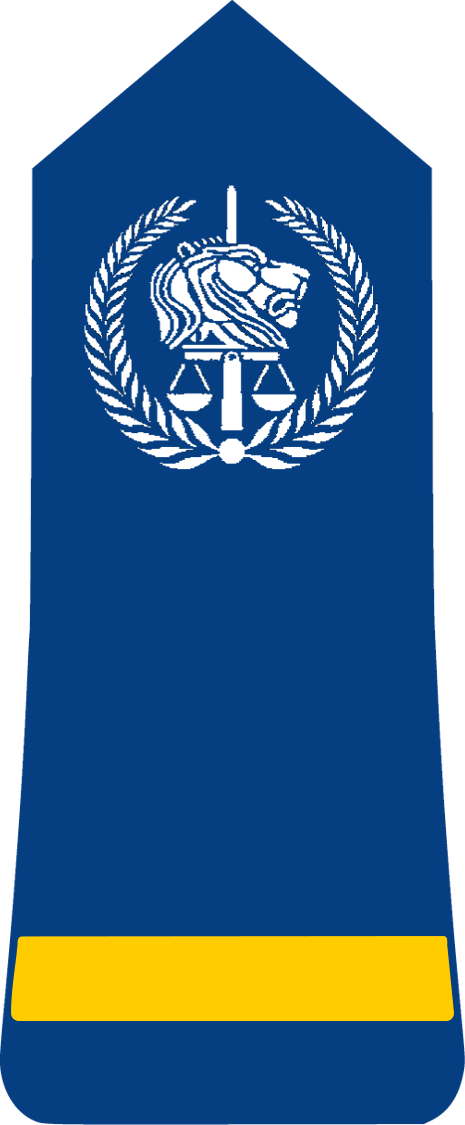
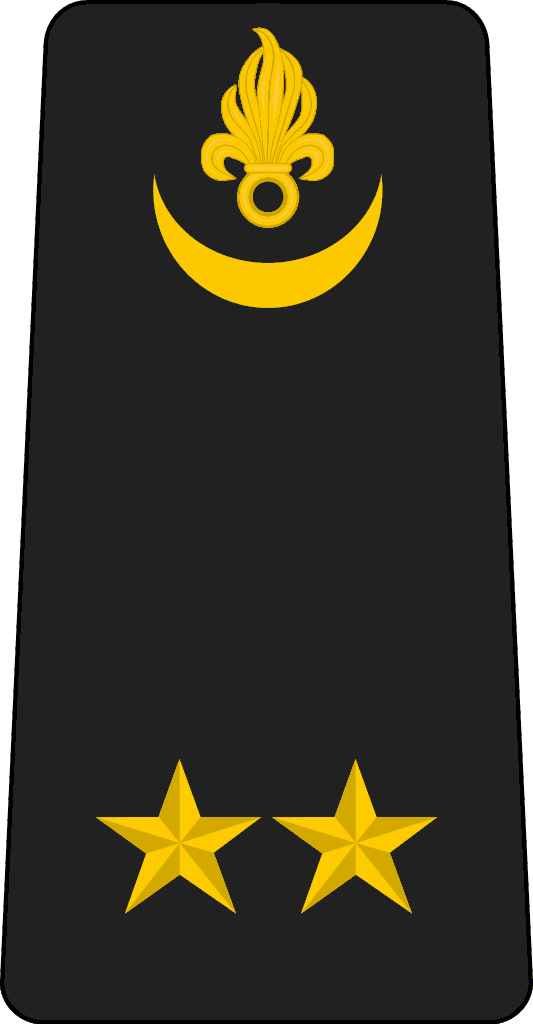
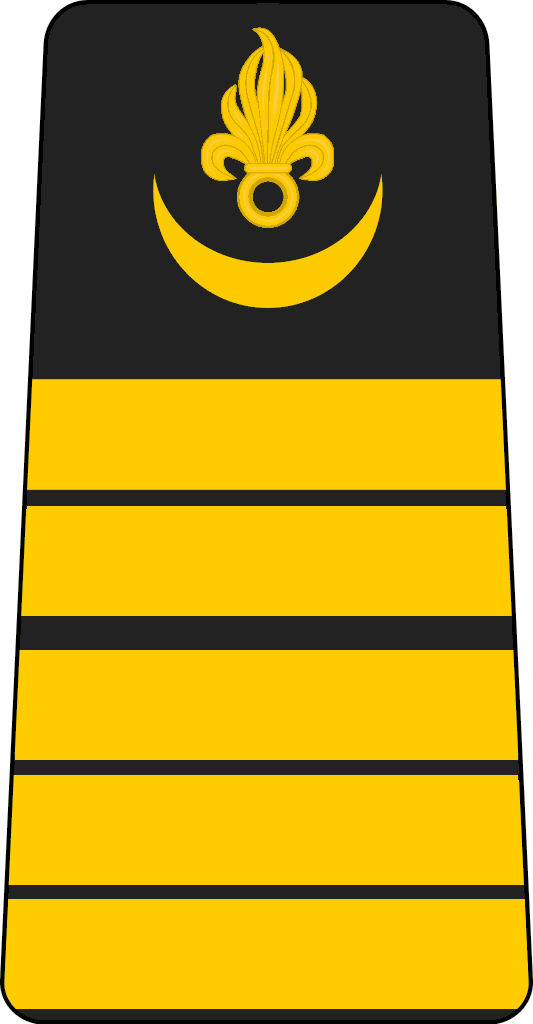
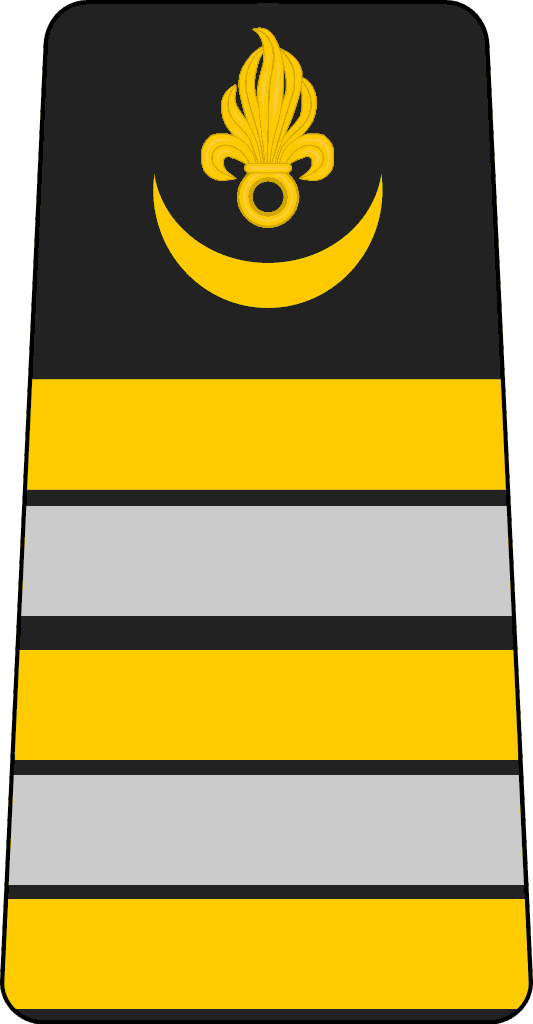
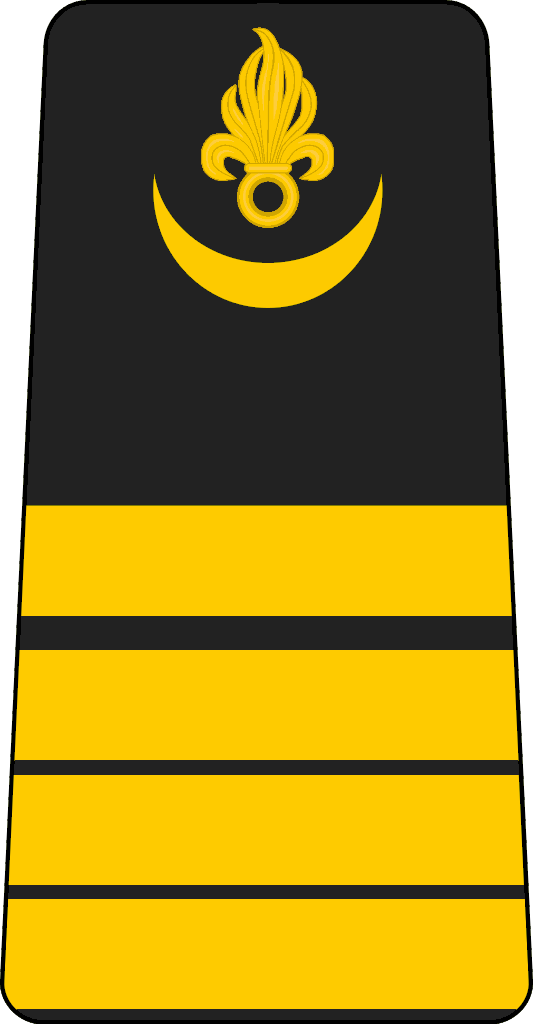
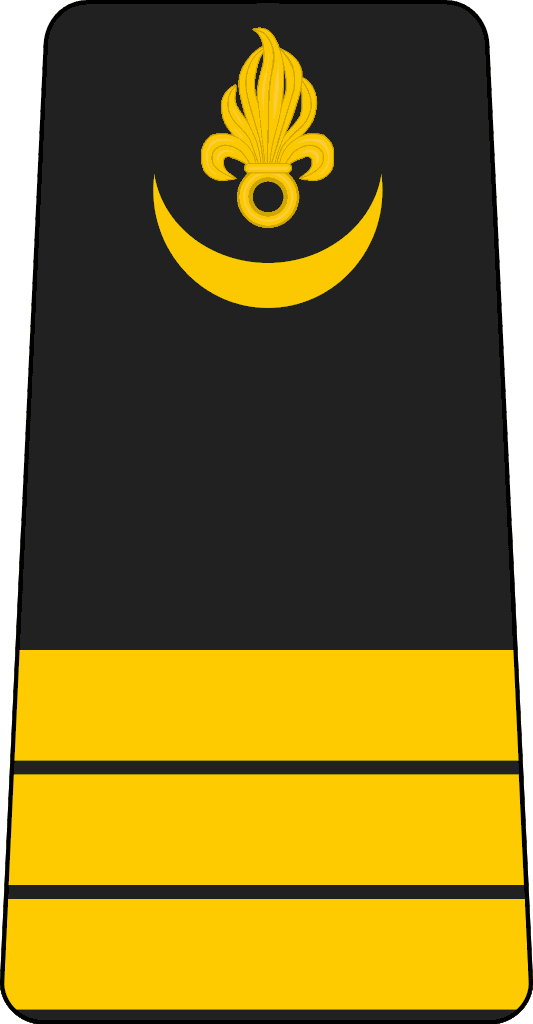
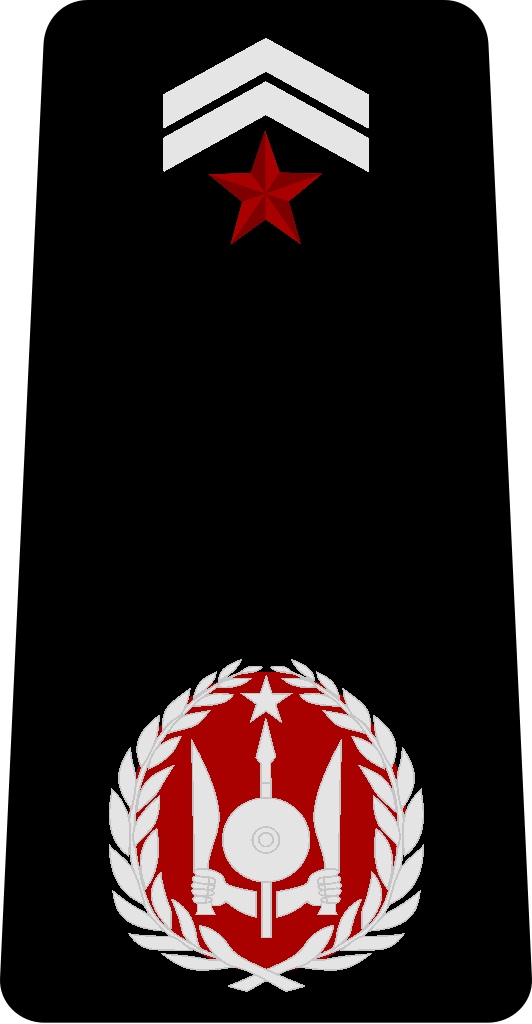
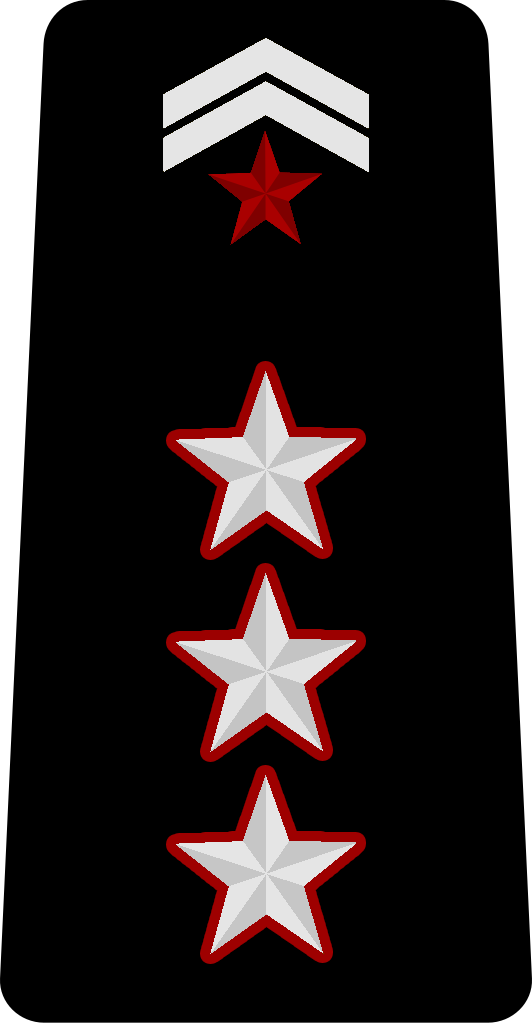
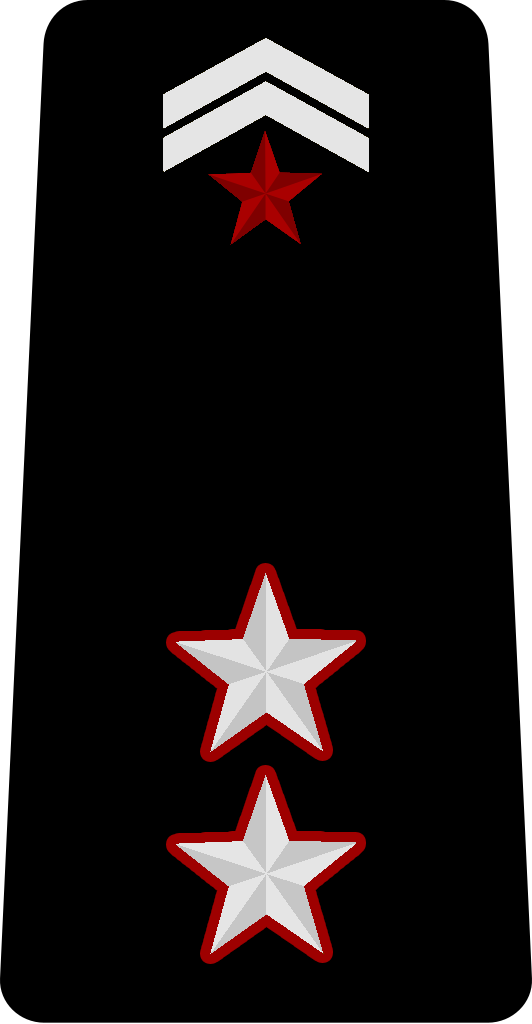
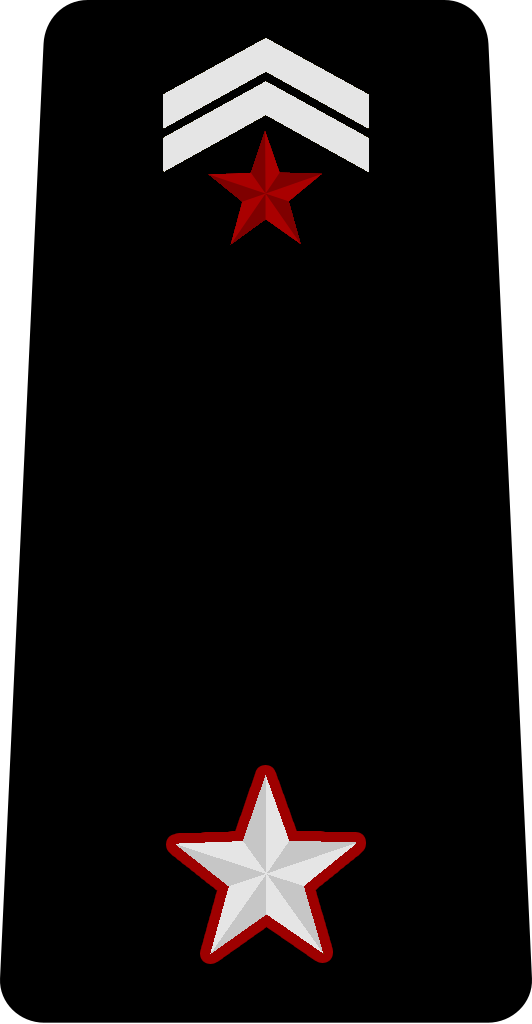
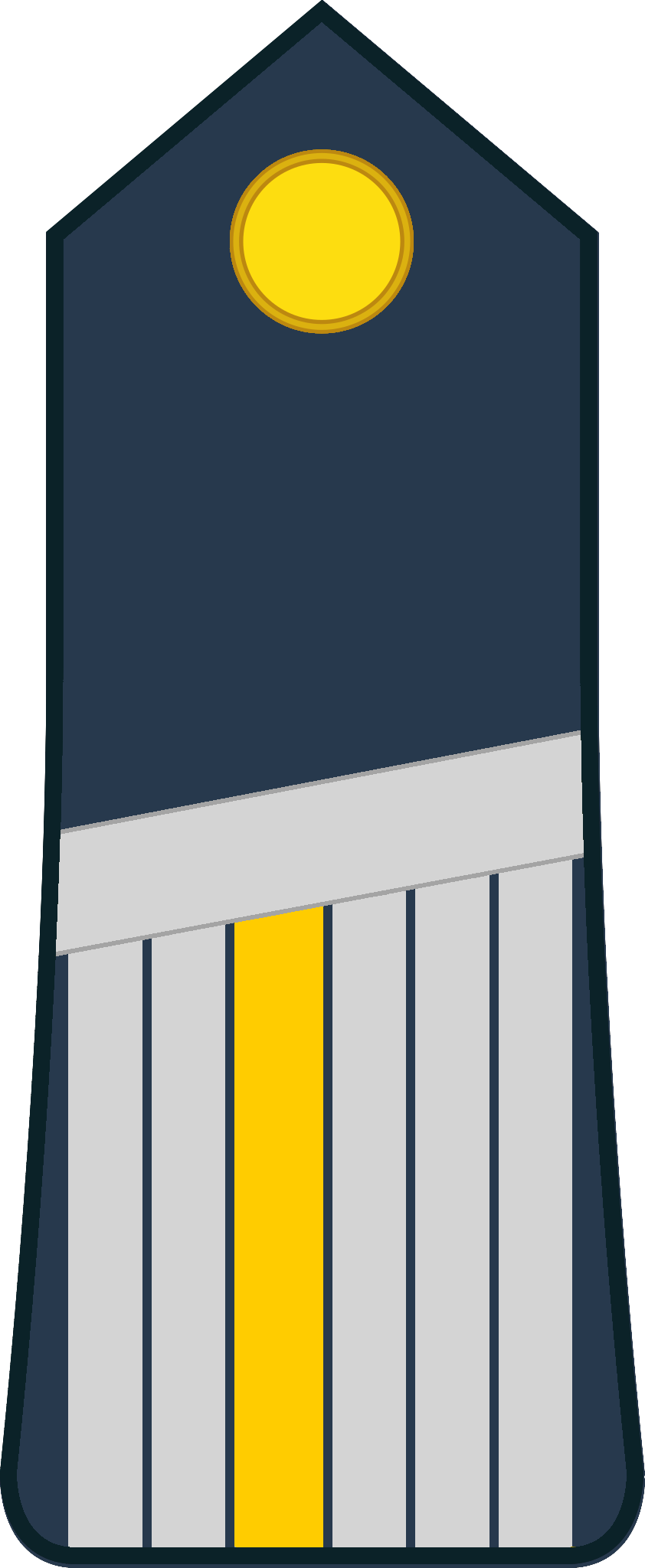
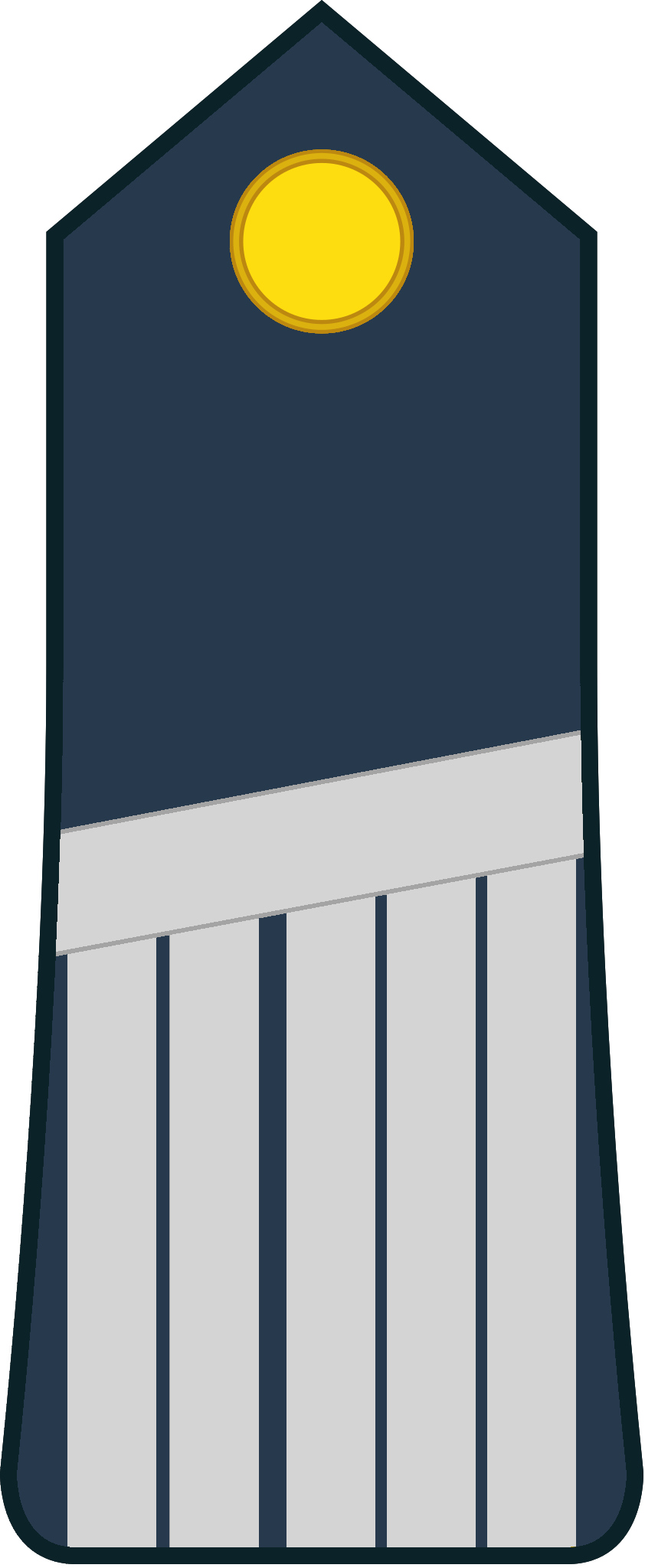
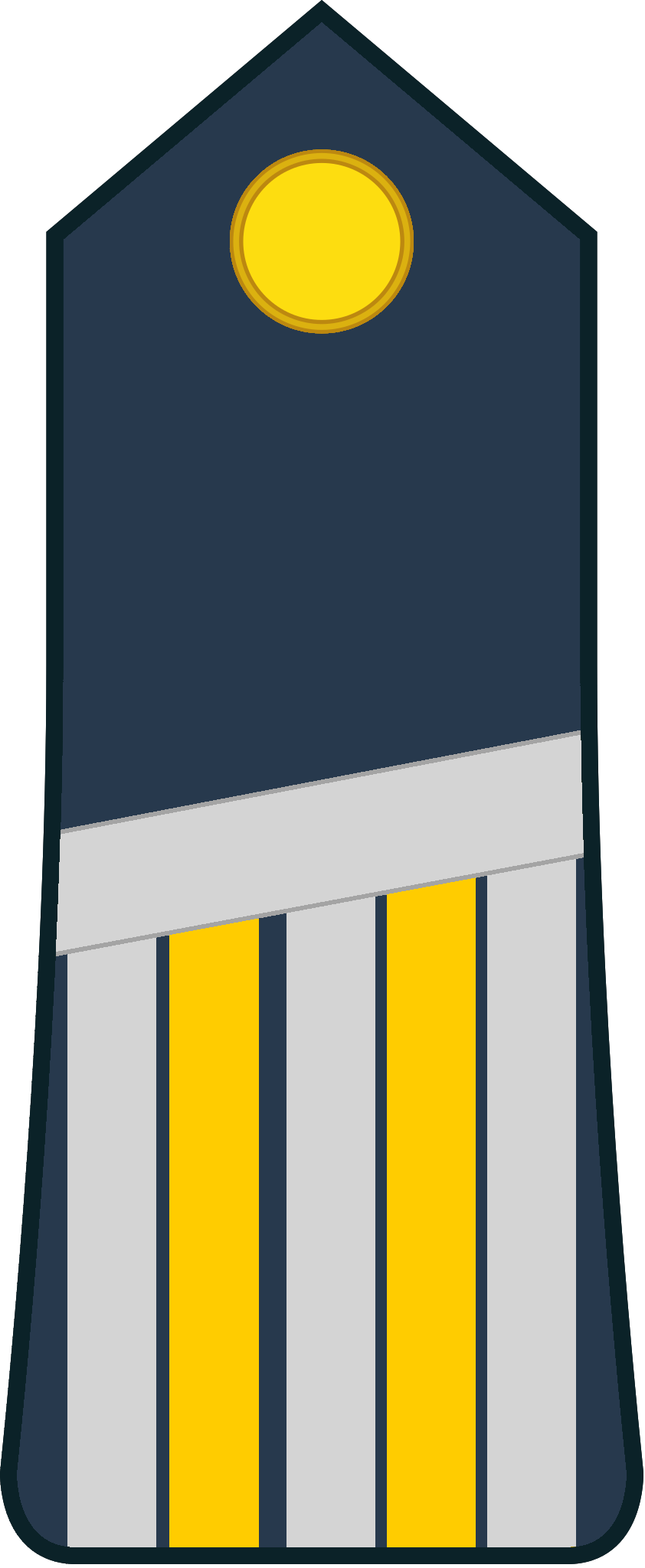
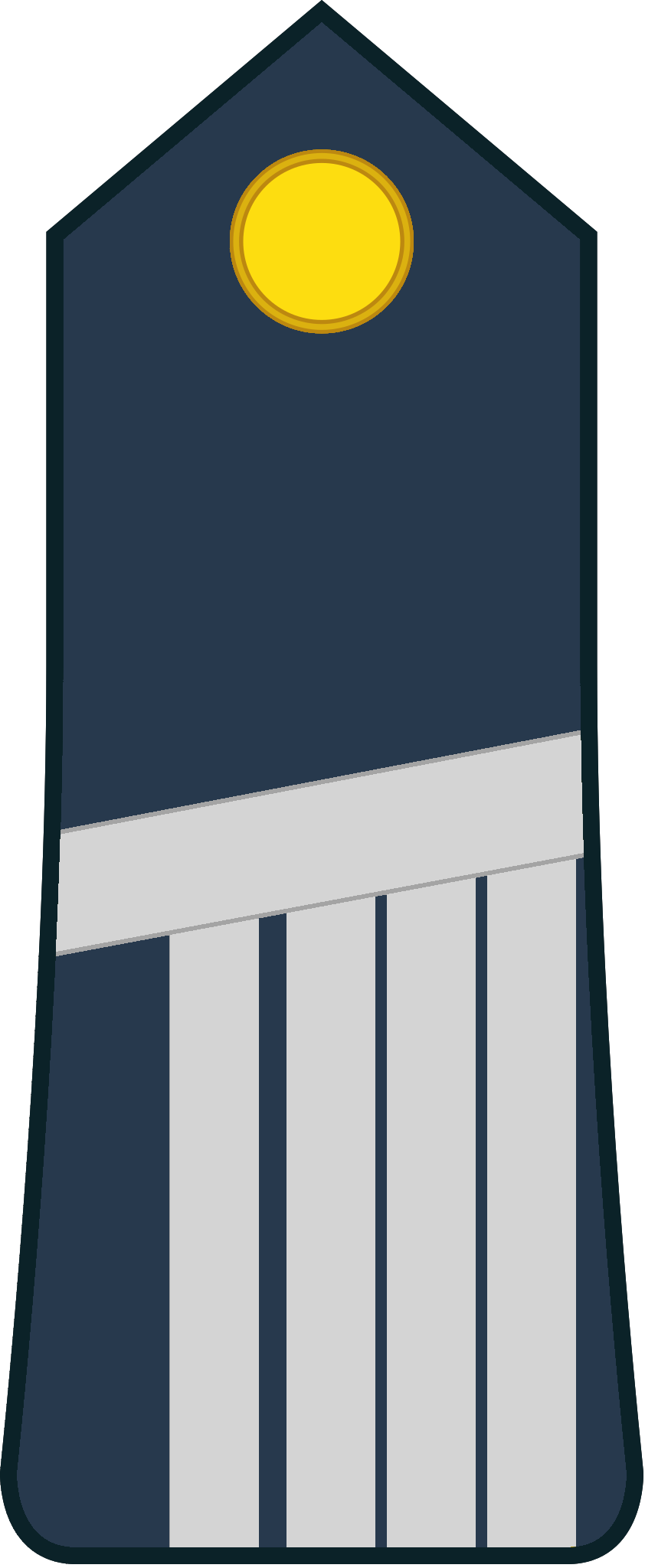
Rank group	General / flag officers					Senior officers				Junior officers
Algerian National Gendarmerie
Algerian National Gendarmerie				لواء; Liwāʾ	عميد 'Amīd	عقيد 'Aqīd		مقدم; Muqaddam	رائد; Rā'id	نقيب; Naqīb	ملازم أول; Mulāzim 'awwal	ملازم; Mulāzim
Algerian National Gendarmerie				Général major	Général	Colonel		Lieutenant-colonel	Commandant	Capitaine	Lieutenant	Sous-lieutenant
(Cameroon) Cameroonian National Gendarmerie
(Cameroon) Cameroonian National Gendarmerie		Général d'armée	Général de corps d'armée	Général de division	Général de brigade	Colonel		Lieutenant-Colonel	Chef d'Escadron	Capitaine	Lieutenant	Sous-Lieutenant
Royal Canadian Mounted Police
Royal Canadian Mounted Police		Commissioner; Commissaire	Deputy commissioner Sous-commissaire		Assistant commissioner Commissaire adjoint	Chief superintendent Surintendant principal		Superintendent; Surintendant	Inspector; Inspecteur
Chadian National Gendarmerie
Chadian National Gendarmerie				Général de division	Général de brigade	Colonel		Lieutenant-Colonel	Commandant	Capitaine	Lieutenant	Sous-Lieutenant
Comorian Gendarmerie
Comorian Gendarmerie					Général de brigade	Colonel		Lieutenant-colonel	Commandant	Capitaine	Lieutenant	Sous-Lieutenant
Congolese Gendarmerie
Congolese Gendarmerie		Général d'armée	Général de corps	Général de division	Général de brigade	Colonel		Lieutenant-Colonel	Commandant	Capitaine	Lieutenant	Sous-lieutenant
(Djibouti) Djiboutian National Gendarmerie
(Djibouti) Djiboutian National Gendarmerie					Général de brigade	Colonel-major	Colonel	Lieutenant-colonel	Chef d'escadron	Capitaine	Lieutenant	Sous-lieutenant
(France) French Gendarmerie
(France) French Gendarmerie		Général d'armée	Général de corps d'armée	Général de division	Général de brigade	Colonel		Lieutenant-Colonel	Chef d'Escadron	Capitaine	Lieutenant	Sous-Lieutenant
Ivory Coast Gendarmerie
Ivory Coast Gendarmerie		Général d'armée	Général de corps d'armée	Général de division	Général de brigade	Colonel-major	Colonel	Lieutenant-colonel	Chef D'Escadron	Capitaine	Lieutenant	Sous-lieutenant
Army of Monaco
Army of Monaco	Général en chef des armées					Colonel		Lieutenant-colonel	Commandant	Capitaine	Lieutenant	Sous-Lieutenant
Senegalese Gendarmerie
Senegalese Gendarmerie			Général de corps d'armée	Général de division	Général de brigade	Colonel		Lieutenant-colonel	Commandant	Capitaine	Lieutenant	Sous-lieutenant
(Togo) Togolese National Gendarmerie
(Togo) Togolese National Gendarmerie		Général d'armée	Général de corps d'armée	Général de division	Général de brigade	Colonel		Lieutenant-colonel	Commandant	Capitaine	Lieutenant	Sous-Lieutenant
Vanuatu Mobile Forces
Vanuatu Mobile Forces				Major general Bigfala Jenerol	Brigadier	Colonel; Kolonel		Lieutenant colonel Lietnen Kolonel	Major; Bigfala	Captain; Kapten	First lieutenant Fas Lietnen	Second lieutenant Seken Lietnen
Rank group	General / flag officers					Senior officers				Junior officers

== Works cited ==
- Lutterbeck, Derek (2018) [2013]. The Paradox of Gendarmeries: Between Expansion, Demilitarization and Dissolution (Report). DCAF. doi:10.5334/bbs. ISBN 978-1-911529-35-4. ISSN 2571-9297.
