= Chief of the General Staff (Djibouti) =

Highest-ranking officer of the Djibouti Armed Forces

- Chef d'état-major général des armées (French)
- Incumbent; General Zakaria Cheikh Ibrahim since 28 November 2013
- Ministry of Defense
- Reports to: President of Djibouti; Minister of Defence
- Seat: Djibouti City
- Appointer: President of Djibouti
- First holder: Ali Meidal Waiss

The Chief of the General Staff (Somali: Taliyaha Guud ee Ciidamada Qalabka Sida, Arabic: رئيس هيئة الأركان العامة للقوات المسلحة, French: Chef d'état-major général des armées) is the highest-ranking military officer within the Djibouti Armed Forces, responsible for the operational administration of Djibouti's military.

== List of officeholders ==
No.	Portrait	Name (born–died)	Term of office			Ref.
No.	Portrait	Name (born–died)	Took office	Left office	Time in office	Ref.
1		General; Ali Meidal Waiss (?–?)	27 June 1977	28 February 1992	14 years, 246 days	
2		Major General; Fathi Ahmed Houssein (?–?)	2 August 1993	28 November 2013	20 years, 118 days	
3		General; Zakaria Cheikh Ibrahim (?–?)	28 November 2013	Incumbent	12 years, 359 days	
