= Republican Guard (Djibouti) =

Republican Guard Garde Républicaine Djiboutienne
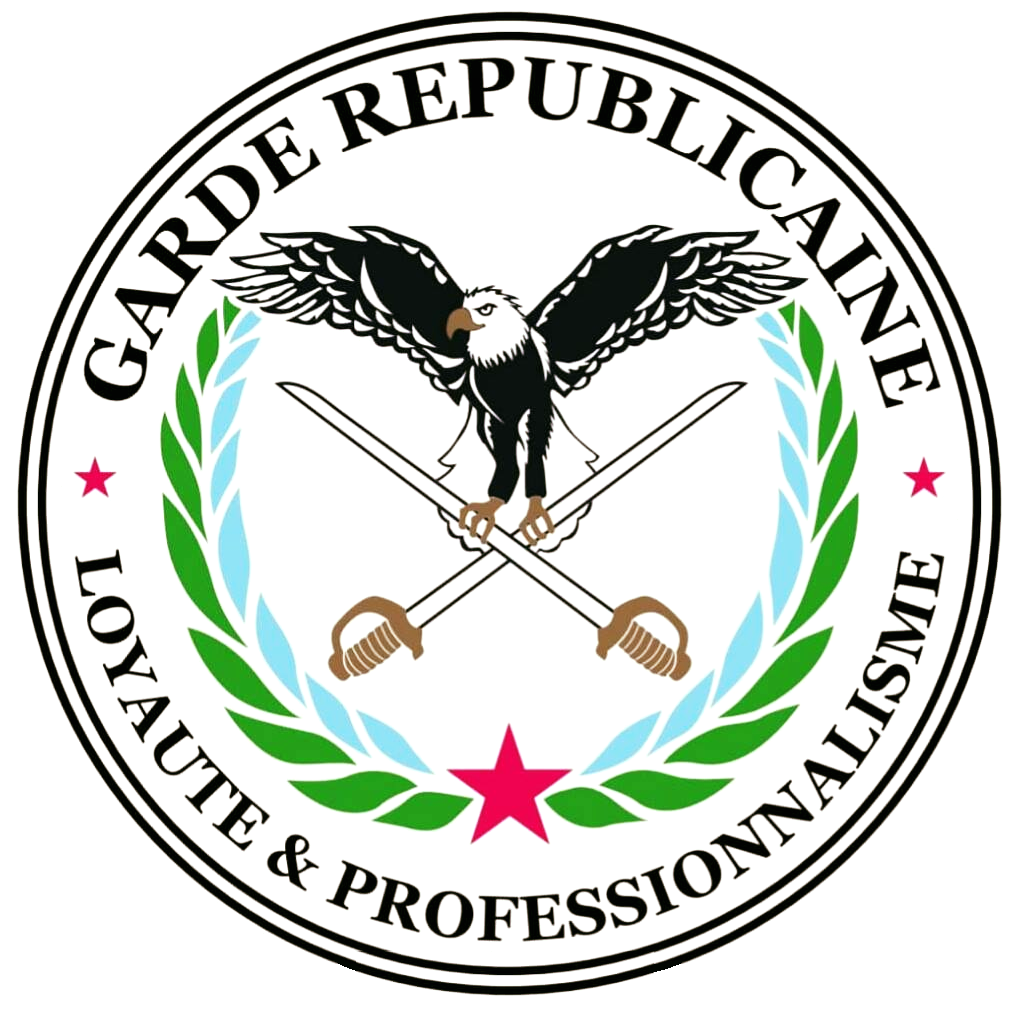

Agency overview
- Formed: 30 January 2002

Jurisdictional structure
- Operations jurisdiction: Djibouti
- Specialist jurisdiction: Protection of international or domestic VIPs, protection of significant state assets

Operational structure
- Headquarters: Djibouti City
- Agency executive: Colonel Mohamed Djama Doualeh, Commander of the Republican Guard
- Parent agency: Djiboutian Armed Forces

The Djiboutian Republican Guard (French: Garde Républicaine Djiboutienne), is a section of the Djiboutian Armed Forces that provides security missions for the highest Djiboutian state authorities and the public. It is under the direct authority of the President of Djibouti. The unit is traditionally relied on as the backbone of the government, and the unit is the best armed and trained in the armed forces. It is the most powerful security unit in Djibouti and is responsible for ensuring internal security.

== See also ==
- Republican Guard (Egypt)
- Republican Guard (Ethiopia)
- Republican Guard (Yemen)
