= List of wars involving Djibouti =

This is a list of wars involving the Republic of Djibouti.

== Colonial Djibouti (1883–1977) ==
Conflict	Combatant 1	Combatant 2	Results	Head of State	Djiboutian casualties
Djibouti Conflict (1968 – 1977)	FLCS	France: (France) French Territory of the Afars and the Issas	FRCS victory: Establishment of the Republic of Djibouti.	N/A	Unknown

== Republic of Djibouti (1977-present) ==
Conflict	Combatant 1	Combatant 2	Results	President of Djibouti	Djiboutian casualties
Djiboutian Civil War (1991 – 1994)	Djibouti	FRUD	Government victory: FRUD Peace Accord.	Hassan Gouled Aptidon	1,000
FRUD Insurgency (1998 – Present)	Djibouti	FRUD	Ongoing: Ongoing low-level insurgency.	Ismaïl Omar Guelleh	12+
Djiboutian–Eritrean border conflict (2008)	Djibouti	Eritrea	Victory: Fighting subsided after 3 days.	Ismaïl Omar Guelleh	12
Somali Civil War (2011 – Present)	Somalia AMISOM: Uganda; Burundi; Ethiopia; Kenya; Djibouti; Sierra Leone; Guinea; Nigeria; Ghana	al-Shabaab; Hizbul Islam (2012–2014) ISIL (2015 – Present): Islamic State in Somalia	Ongoing: Federal Government formed in August 2012.	Ismaïl Omar Guelleh	8+
