= Ministry of Defence (Djibouti) =

Ministry of Defence of Djibouti
- وزارة الدفاع في جيبوتي
- Emblem of Djibouti

Agency overview
- Jurisdiction: Government of Djibouti
- Headquarters: Djibouti City, Djibouti
- Agency executive: Hassan Omar Mohamed Bourhan, Minister of Defence

The Ministry of Defence of Djibouti is the governmental body in charge of the Djibouti Armed Forces (DJAF). It is Djibouti's ministry of defence. Hassan Omar Mohamed is the current Minister of Defence.

== Ministers of Defence ==
- Ahmed Hassan Ahmed, 1977-1978
- Habib Mohamed Loita, 1978-1985
- Ali Barkat Siradj, 1985-1989
- Ismael Ali Youssouf, 1989-1993
- Ahmed Boulaleh Barreh, 1993-1996
- Abdallah Chirwa Djibril, 1996-1999
- Ougoureh Kifleh Ahmed, 1999-2011
- Abdoulkader Kamil Mohamed, 2011-2013
- Hassan Darar Houffaneh, 2013-2016
- Ali Hassan Bahdon, 2016-2019
- Hassan Omar Mohamed Bourhan, 2019-Incumbent

== See also ==
- Ministries of Djibouti
