= Djiboutian Coast Guard =

Djiboutian Coast Guard Garde-Côtes Djiboutienne
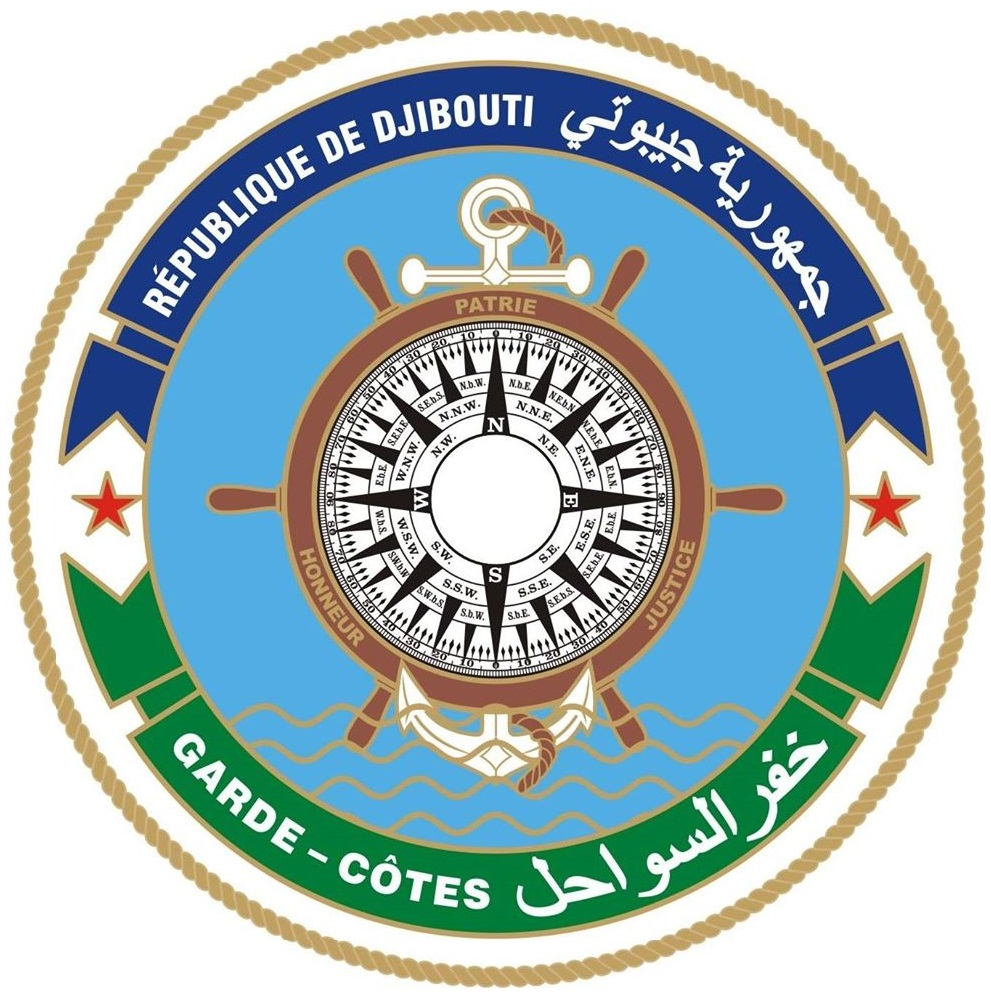
- Banner of the Djiboutian Coast Guard

- Racing Stripe

Agency overview
- Formed: 17 January 2011

Jurisdictional structure
- Operations jurisdiction: Djibouti
- Specialist jurisdiction: Coastal patrol, marine border protection, marine search and rescue

Operational structure
- Headquarters: Djibouti City, Djibouti
- Agency executive: Colonel Wais Omar Bogoreh, Acting Commander of the Coast Guard
- Parent agency: Djiboutian Navy

The Djiboutian Coast Guard (French: Garde-Côtes Djiboutienne GCD), is the coast guard of Djibouti and a division of the Djiboutian Navy responsible for protecting the interests of the Republic of Djibouti at sea. Formed in 2011, the coast guard is tasked with such as illegal fishing and exploitation of natural resources, search and rescue (SAR), protection of ecology, fishing, marine pollution, ballast waters, combat against terrorism, trafficking of people, narcotics, and similar. Like many other coast guards, it is a paramilitary organization that can support the Djiboutian Navy in wartime, but resides under separate civilian control in times of peace. The Coast Guard monitor vessels sailing in the Djiboutian territorial waters. The Djiboutian Coast Guard intercepted refugee and migrant boats travelling across the Bab-el-Mandeb.

== Naval Equipment ==
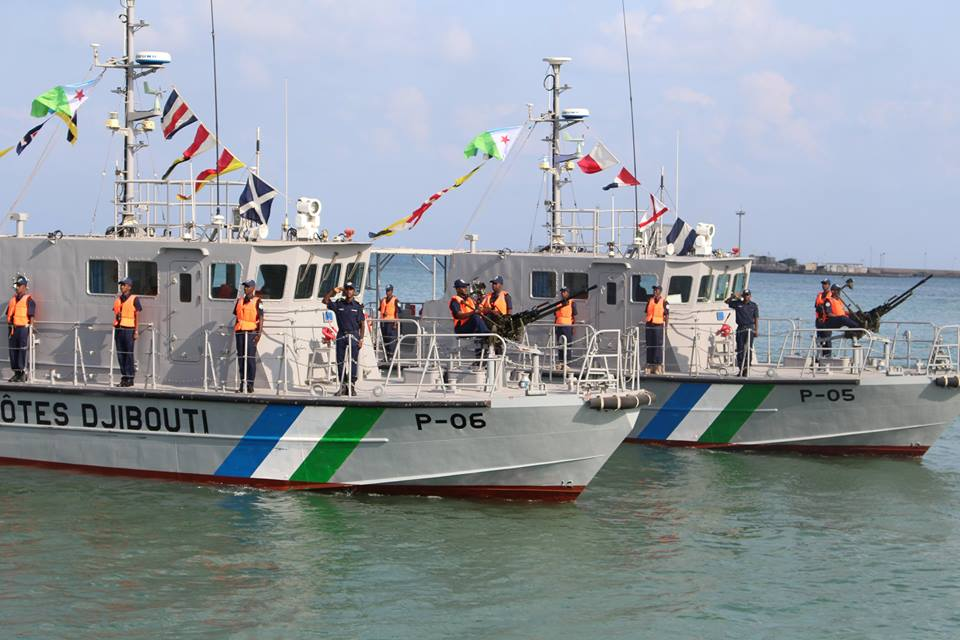
Djiboutian Coast Guard vessels gathered at the port in Djibouti City for a celebration on 17 January 2018

Class	Type	Origin	Quantity	Notes
Patrol Vessel
Classe 200	Patrol Vessel	Italy	2	
Classe 500	Patrol Vessel	Italy	4	
20-meter patrol boat	Patrol Vessel	Japan	2	
19-meter patrol boat	Patrol Vessel	Japan	2	

Its small fleet includes half a dozen Zodiac and Avon type fast launches

== See also ==
- Djiboutian Navy
- Djiboutian Army
- Djiboutian Air Force
