= Djiboutian National Gendarmerie =

Djiboutian National Gendarmerie Gendarmerie Nationale Djiboutienne
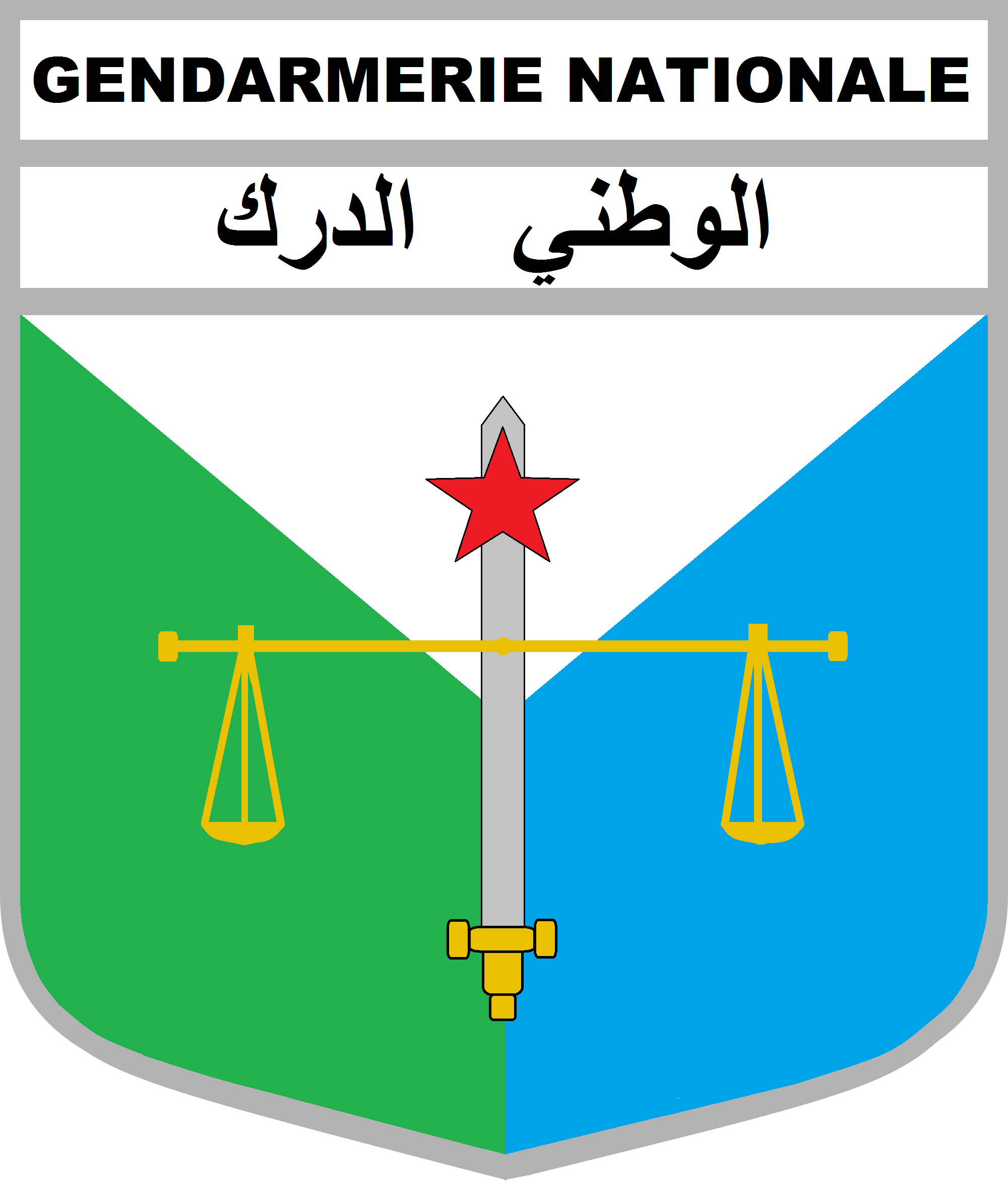
- Abbreviation: GND

Agency overview
- Formed: 6 June 1977
- Employees: 1,500

Jurisdictional structure
- Operations jurisdiction: Djibouti
- General nature: Gendarmerie

Operational structure
- Headquarters: Djibouti City
- Agency executive: Colonel Zakaria Hassan Aden, Chief of Staff of the National Gendarmerie

Website
- www.gendarmerie.dj

The Djibouti National Gendarmerie (French: Gendarmerie Nationale Djiboutienne) is the national Gendarmerie force of Djibouti, tasked with high-risk and specialized law enforcement duties. It is one of the two main police forces in Djibouti (the other being the Djiboutian Police - a civilian force), both having jurisdiction over the civilian population. It is a branch of the Djiboutian Armed Forces placed under the jurisdiction of the Ministry of the Interior—with additional duties to the Ministry of Defense. Its area of responsibility includes smaller towns, rural and suburban areas.

== History ==
The Djibouti Gendarmerie was created on June 6, 1977, headed by a civil authority bearing the title of Director General. In 1978, the post of Director General was abolished and the Institution was placed under the authority of the Chief of Staff of the Djiboutian Armed Forces. It constitutes a corps of the national army and is de facto commanded by a senior officer bearing the title of corps commander. At that time, the Institution had a staff of 300 gendarmes. It was placed under the direct authority of the Chief of the General Staff of the Armed Forces, the Gendarmerie is administered and commanded in the same way as the other Corps of the army, the important decisions being centralized, at the level of the high military command. The Institution does not benefit from any specific policy and subject to the general employment policy in force in all military formations, and this on all levels: personnel administration, financial and budgetary administration, instructions and internships, etc. A fully-fledged military force, in 1991, the gendarmerie was engaged alongside the other armed forces during the armed conflict that shook the country triggered by the Front for the Restoration of Unity and Democracy (FRUD). In this situation of war and its events, the workforce of the Institution was refloated, in particular with the incorporations within the framework of the general mobilization.
