= Politics of Djibouti =

Politics of Djibouti takes place in a framework of a presidential representative democratic republic, whereby the executive power is exercised by the president and the Government. Legislative power is vested in both the Government and the National Assembly. The party system and legislature are dominated by the socialist People's Rally for Progress. In April 2010, a new constitutional amendment was approved. The president serves as both the head of state and head of government, and is directly elected for single six-year term. Government is headed by the president, who appoints the prime minister and the Council of Ministers on the proposal of the latter. There is also a 65-member chamber of deputies, where representatives are popularly elected for terms of five years. Administratively, the country is divided into five regions and one city, with eleven additional sub-prefecture subdivisions. Djibouti is also part of various international organisations, including the United Nations and Arab League.

== History ==
In 1958, on the eve of neighboring Somalia's independence in 1960, a referendum was held in Djibouti to decide whether to join the Somali Republic or to remain with France. The referendum turned out in favour of a continued association with France, partly due to a combined "yes" vote by the sizeable Afar ethnic group and resident Europeans. There was also widespread vote rigging, with the French expelling thousands of Somalis before the referendum reached the polls. The majority of those who had voted "no" were Somalis who were strongly in favour of joining a united Somalia as had been proposed by Mahmoud Harbi, Vice President of the Government Council. Harbi was killed in a plane crash two years later. In 1967, a second plebiscite was held to determine the fate of the territory. Initial results supported a continued but looser relationship with France. Voting was also divided along ethnic lines, with the resident Somalis generally voting for independence, with the goal of eventual union with Somalia, and the Afars largely opting to remain associated with France. However, the referendum was again marred by reports of vote rigging on the part of the French authorities. Shortly after the referendum was held, the former Côte française des Somalis (French Somaliland) was renamed to Territoire français des Afars et des Issas.

In 1977, a third referendum took place. A landslide 98.8% of the electorate supported disengagement from France, officially marking Djibouti's independence.

Hassan Gouled Aptidon, a Somali politician who had campaigned for a "yes" vote in the referendum of 1958, eventually wound up as the nation's first president (1977–1999). He was re-elected, unopposed, to a second 6-year term in April 1987 and to a third 6-year term in May 1993 multiparty elections. The electorate approved the current constitution in September 1992. Many laws and decrees from before independence remain in effect.

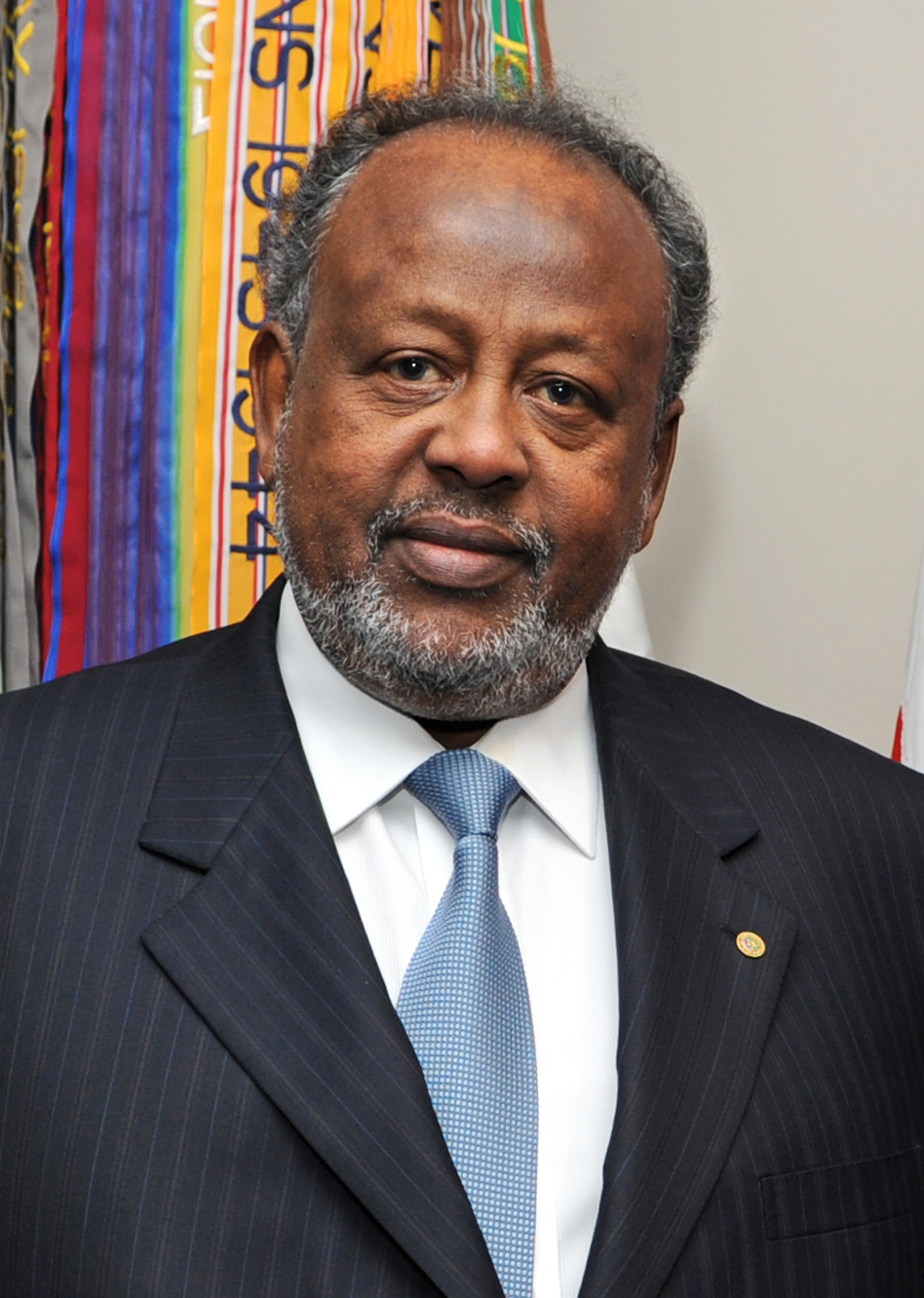
President of Djibouti Ismaïl Omar Guelleh.

In early 1992, the government decided to permit multiple party politics and agreed to the registration of four political parties. By the time of the national assembly elections in December 1992, only three had qualified. They are the Rassemblement Populaire Pour le Progres (People's Rally for Progress) (RPP) which was the only legal party from 1981 until 1992, the Parti du Renouveau Démocratique (The Party for Democratic Renewal) (PRD), and the Parti National Démocratique (National Democratic Party) (PND). Only the RPP and the PRD contested the national assembly elections, and the PND withdrew, claiming that there were too many unanswered questions on the conduct of the elections and too many opportunities for government fraud. The RPP won all 65 seats in the national assembly, with a turnout of less than 50% of the electorate.

In 1999, President Aptidon's chief of staff, head of security, and key adviser for over 20 years, Ismail Omar Guelleh was elected to the Presidency as the RPP candidate. He received 74% of the vote, the other 26% going to opposition candidate Moussa Ahmed Idriss, of the Unified Djiboutian Opposition (ODU). For the first time since independence, no group boycotted the election. Moussa Ahmed Idriss and the ODU later challenged the results based on election "irregularities" and the assertion that "foreigners" had voted in various sub-prefectures of the capital; however, international and locally based observers considered the election to be generally fair, and cited only minor technical difficulties. Guelleh took the oath of office as the second President of the Republic of Djibouti on May 8, 1999, with the support of an alliance between the RPP and the government-recognised section of the Afar-led FRUD.

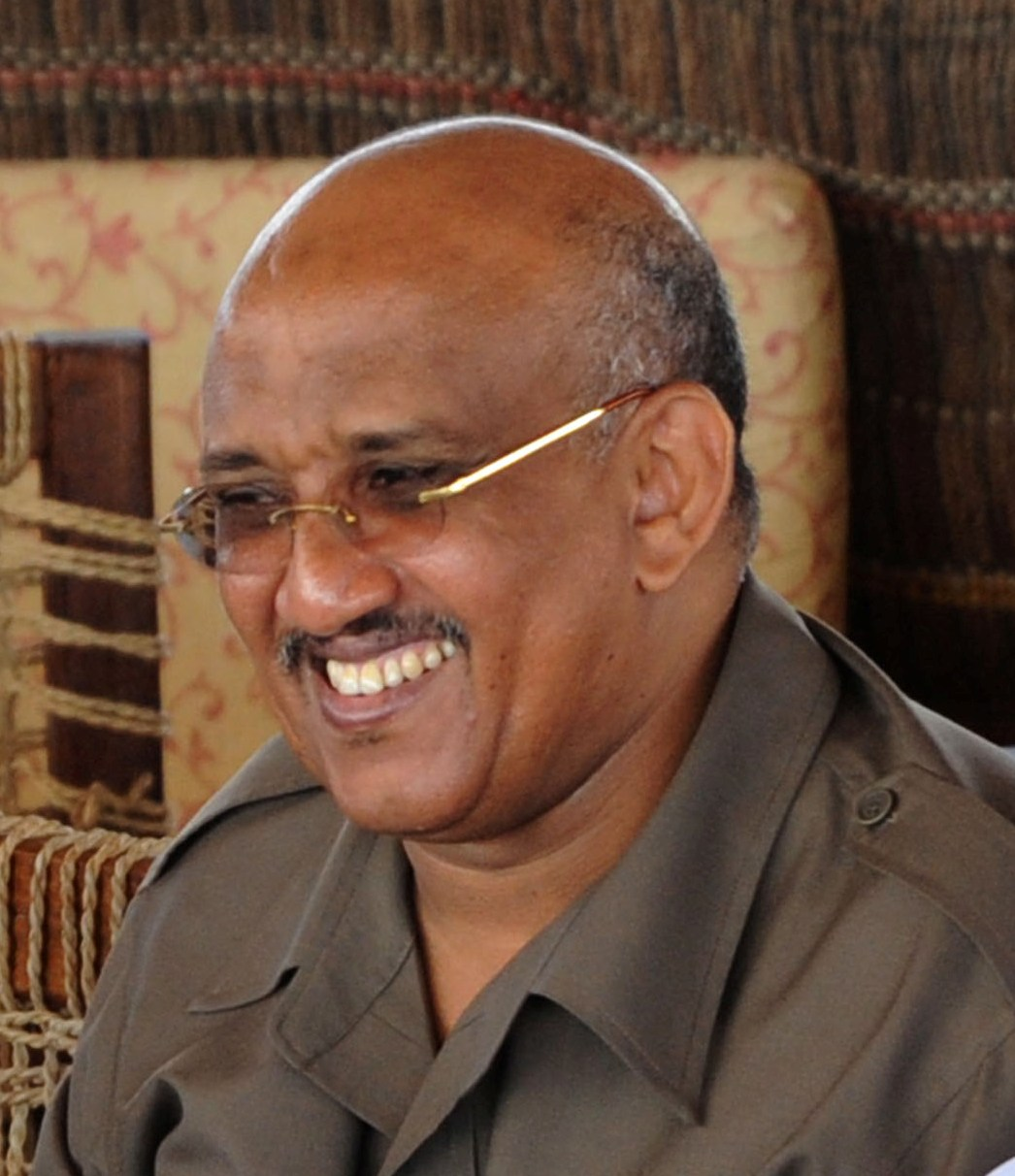
Dileita Mohamed Dileita, former prime minister of Djibouti, vice-president of the People's Rally for Progress (RPP), and president of the Union for a Presidential Majority (UMP).

Currently, political power is shared by a Somali Issa president and an Afar prime minister, with cabinet posts roughly divided. However, it is the Issas who dominate the government, civil service, and the ruling party, a situation that has bred resentment and political competition between the Somali Issas and the Afars.

The government is dominated by the Somali Issa Mamasen, who enjoy the support of the Somali clans, especially the Isaaq (the clan of the current president's wife) and the Gadabuursi Dir (who are the second most prominent Somali clan in Djibouti politics). In early November 1991, civil war erupted in Djibouti between the government and a predominantly Afar rebel group, the Front for the Restoration of Unity and Democracy (FRUD). The FRUD signed a peace accord with the government in December 1994, ending the conflict. Two FRUD members were subsequently made cabinet members, and in the presidential elections of 1999 the FRUD campaigned in support of the RPP. In February 2000, another branch of FRUD signed a peace accord with the government. On 12 May 2001, President Ismail Omar Guelleh presided over the signing of what is termed the final peace accord officially ending the decade-long civil war between the government and the armed faction of the FRUD. The treaty successfully completed the peace process begun on 7 February 2000 in Paris, with Ahmed Dini Ahmed representing the FRUD.

On 8 April 2005, President Guelleh was sworn in for his second six-year term after a one-man election. He took 100% of the votes in a 78.9% turnout.

In early 2011, the Djiboutian citizenry took part in a series of protests against the long-serving government, which were associated with the larger Arab Spring demonstrations. Guelleh was re-elected to a third term later that year, with 80.63% of the vote in a 75% turnout. Although opposition groups boycotted the ballot over changes to the constitution permitting Guelleh to run again for office, international observers generally described the election as free and fair.

On 31 March 2013, Guelleh replaced long-serving prime minister Dilleita Mohamed Dilleita with former president of the Union for a Presidential Majority (UMP) Abdoulkader Kamil Mohamed.

In April 2021, Ismael Guelleh, the second president of Djibouti since independence from France in 1977, was re-elected for his fifth term.

== Head of state and government ==
Main office-holders
Office	Name	Party	Since
President	Ismail Omar Guelleh	RPP	8 May 1999
Prime Minister	Abdoulkader Kamil Mohamed	RPP	1 April 2013

The president is directly elected by popular vote for a five-year term. The prime minister is appointed by the president, and the Council of Ministers is solely responsible to the president, as specified in Articles 21 and 23 of the Constitution of Djibouti.

== Political parties and elections ==
=== Presidential elections ===
Candidate	Party	Votes	%
Ismaïl Omar Guelleh	People's Rally for Progress	111,389	87.07
Omar Elmi Khaireh	Union for National Salvation	9,385	7.34
Mohamed Daoud Chehem	Union for National Salvation	2,340	1.83
Mohamed Moussa Ali	Independent	1,946	1.52
Hassan Idriss Ahmed	Independent	1,770	1.38
Djama Abdourahman Djama	Independent	1,103	0.86
Total		127,933	100.00
Valid votes		127,933	97.08
Invalid/blank votes		3,845	2.92
Total votes		131,778	100.00
Registered voters/turnout		191,103	68.96
Source: Journal Officiel

=== Parliamentary elections ===
Party	Votes	%	Seats	+/–
Union for the Presidential Majority	105,278	87.83	57	+2
UDJ–PDD	13,088	10.92	7	–
Centre of Unified Democrats	811	0.68	1	+1
Republican Alliance for Development	684	0.57	0	–
Total	119,861	100.00	65	0
Valid votes	119,861	96.71		
Invalid/blank votes	4,073	3.29		
Total votes	123,934	100.00		
Registered voters/turnout	194,169	63.83		
Source: Presidency of Djibouti, IPU

== Administrative divisions ==
The National Assembly building in Djibouti City.

Djibouti is sectioned into five administrative regions and one city:

Ali Sabieh Region, Arta Region, Dikhil Region, Djibouti Region, Obock Region and Tadjourah Region.

The country is further sub-divided into eleven sub-prefectures.

== International organization participation ==
ACCT, ACP, AfDB, AFESD, AL, AMF, ECA, FAO, G-77, IBRD, ICAO, ICC, ICRM, IDA, IDB, IFAD, IFC, IFRCS, IGAD, ILO, IMF, IMO, Intelsat (nonsignatory user), Interpol, IOC, ITU, ITUC, NAM, OAU, OIC, OPCW, UN, UNCTAD, UNESCO, UNIDO, UPU, WFTU, WHO, WMO, WToO, WTrO
