= List of Djiboutian politicians =

The following is a list of Djiboutian politicians, both past and present.

== A ==
- Abdi, Ahmed Ibrahim
- Abdou, Mohamed Bolock
- Ahmed, Ahmed Dini
- Ali, Idriss Arnaoud
- Ali, Mohamed Moussa
- Ali, Souleiman Miyir

== B ==
- Bourhan, Ali Aref

== C ==
- Chehem, Mohamed Moussa

== D ==
- Daoud, Ali Mohamed
- Daoud, Ibrahim Chehem
- Dato, Hasna Mohamed
- Dileïta, Dileïta Mohamed

== E ==
- Elabé, Mohamed Djama

== F ==
- Farah, Ali Abdi
- Farah, Moumin Bahdon
- Farah, Mahamoud Harbi

== G ==
- Gouled Aptidon, Hassan
- Guelleh, Ismaïl Omar
- Ali, Helaf Orbis
- Hamadou, Barkat Gourad
- Hamariteh, Abdillahi
- Hassan, Ahmed Mohamed

== I ==
- Helaf Orbis Ali, former ministere of the defence, justice, labor, civil service, agriculture from 1974 to 1994

== K ==
- Kamil, Abdallah Mohamed

== M ==
- Mohamed, Mohamed Abdoulkader

== R ==
- Awaleh, Aden Robleh

== Y ==
- Youssouf, Ahmed Aden
- Youssouf, Mahamoud Ali
