= Moumin Bahdon Farah =

Djiboutian politician

Moumin Bahdon Farah (Somali: Muumin Bahdoon Faarax) (24 October 1939 – 1 September 2009) was a Djiboutian politician and the President of the Social Democratic People's Party (PPSD). He was Minister of Foreign Affairs from 1978 to 1993 and Minister of Justice from 1993 to 1996. Concurrently, he was a member of the National Assembly of Djibouti.

== Life ==
=== Early life and cabinet service ===
Farah was an Issa and a member of the Odah Gob subclan. Prior to independence, he became Minister of the Interior, Posts and Telecommunications in 1976, as part of the transitional government headed by Abdallah Mohamed Kamil. In Djibouti's first post-independence government, named on 15 July 1977, Farah was Minister of the Interior. He was moved to the post of Minister of Foreign Affairs and Cooperation on 2 October 1978, and he remained Foreign Minister for nearly 15 years. In the December 1992 parliamentary election, Farah was the third candidate on the candidate list of the governing People's Rally for Progress (RPP) for the District of Djibouti. Following the 1992 election, Farah was moved to the position of Minister of Justice, Muslim Affairs and Prisons on 4 February 1993. He represented President Hassan Gouled Aptidon on the National Electoral Commission at the time of the May 1993 presidential election. He opposed the 1994 peace agreement with the moderate faction of the Front for the Restoration of Unity and Democracy (FRUD) rebel group.

=== Opposition efforts ===
In 1995, Farah led a faction of the government that opposed Prime Minister Barkat Gourad Hamadou and the head of the Cabinet, Ismail Omar Guelleh. He was dismissed from his position as Minister of Justice, Muslim Affairs and Prisons by President Gouled on 27 March 1996. He also served as Secretary-General of the RPP, but was removed from the party leadership in 1996. In April 1996, he and his supporters established a new parliamentary group, the Group for Democracy and the Republic; Farah became its President.

At about the same time, together with two other deputies in the National Assembly, Ahmed Boulaleh Barreh and Ali Mahamade Houmed, Farah released a communiqué urging party militants and the people "to come together and mobilize to thwart, by all legal and peaceful means, this deliberate policy of President Hassan Gouled Aptidon to rule by terror and force while trampling underfoot our Constitution and republican institutions." As a result of this communiqué, he and the other two deputies were accused of offending the Head of State, and their parliamentary immunity was lifted on 15 June 1996 so that they could be tried on this charge. They appealed the lifting of their parliamentary immunity to the Constitutional Council on 20 June, and it responded favorably in a decision on 31 July 1996. Despite this, they were sentenced to six months in prison on 7 August 1996. They were also fined 200,000 Djiboutian francs and deprived of their civic rights for five years, thereby barring them from seeking election to the National Assembly during that time. A subsequent report to the United Nations Commission on Human Rights asserted that the trial was unfair. Farah joined the Unified Djiboutian Opposition (ODU) after his release and became a member of the ODU's High Council. Because the Group for Democracy and the Republic could not participate in the December 1997 parliamentary election, Farah instead urged support for Party for Democratic Renewal (PRD).

Farah was arrested in early May 1998 on the grounds that he was suspected of financing a radical faction of the Front for the Restoration of Unity and Democracy (FRUD). Along with Boulaleh Barreh and 15 soldiers, Farah was charged with fomenting military unrest and plotting a coup; they were put on trial in September 1998. On 25 November 1998, Farah signed a communiqué together with Abdillahi Hamareiteh, the President of the Party of Democratic Renewal (PRD), and Mahdi Ibrahim God, the President of the Djibouti United Opposition Front (FUOD), providing for the creation of an alliance between the three groups. On 1 October 2001, he and the others convicted of insulting the Head of State in 1996 were granted an amnesty.

=== Founding the PPSD ===
Farah subsequently founded the PPSD in 2002; he filed a declaration for the PPSD at the Interior Ministry on 26 October 2002, and Interior Minister Abdoulkader Doualeh Waïs announced that the party was legally registered on 31 October 2002. Speaking in a television interview on 22 November 2002, Farah said that his new party was not part of the opposition, expressing support for the government and stating that the PPSD planned to ally with the RPP. Accordingly, the PPSD joined the RPP and two other parties in a coalition, the Union for a Presidential Majority (UMP), for the January 2003 parliamentary election. Farah was included as the 21st candidate on the UMP's candidate list for the District of Djibouti in this election and won a seat (the UMP won all 65 seats in the National Assembly). In the National Assembly, he has served on the External Affairs Commission.

In 2007, a former member of French intelligence said that Farah, while serving as Justice Minister, ordered Bernard Borrel—a French judge who was killed in Djibouti in 1995—to investigate major Djiboutian political figures. Farah released a statement on 15 July 2007 denying this claim. In the February 2008 parliamentary election, Farah was the fifth candidate on the UMP's candidate list for the District of Djibouti.

=== Death ===
On September 1, 2009, Moumin Bahdon Farah died in Paris.
