= Ahmed Boulaleh Barreh =

Djiboutian politician (1929–2010)

Member of the National Assembly of Djibouti

Personal details
- Born: 1929 Ali-Sabieh
- Died: 2010 (aged 80–81)

Ahmed Boulaleh Barreh, (Somali: Axmed Bulaale Barre; 1929–2010), also known as Gabayo, was a Djiboutian politician. He was the Vice-President of the People's Social Democratic Party (PPSD) and a member of the National Assembly of Djibouti.

== Life and career ==
Boulaleh was born in Ali-Sabieh and was an Issa of the Furlaba subclan. He was first elected to the National Assembly in 1977 and was continuously re-elected during the subsequent 20 years. He was appointed to the government as Minister of the Interior, Posts and Communications on 13 May 1991 and was the National Assembly's representative on the Administrative Council of the Autonomous Port of Djibouti until 13 August 1992. In the December 1992 parliamentary election, he was the second candidate on the candidate list of the governing People's Rally for Progress (RPP) for the city of Djibouti. Following this election, he was moved to the post of Minister of National Defense on 4 February 1993. Like Justice Minister Moumin Bahdon Farah, he opposed the 1994 peace agreement with the moderate faction of the Front for the Restoration of Unity and Democracy (FRUD) rebel group. Boulaleh remained Minister of National Defense until 27 March 1996, when he was dismissed from the government, along with Farah, by President Hassan Gouled Aptidon.

After their dismissal, Farah and Boulaleh went into opposition and founded the Group for Democracy and the Republic, which was headed by Farah. Farah, Boulaleh and another National Assembly deputy, Ali Mahamade Houmed, released a communiqué urging party militants and the people "to come together and mobilize to thwart, by all legal and peaceful means, this deliberate policy of President Hassan Gouled Aptidon to rule by terror and force while trampling underfoot our Constitution and republican institutions." As a result of this communiqué, they were accused of offending the Head of State, and their parliamentary immunity was lifted on 15 June 1996 so that they could be tried on this charge. They appealed the lifting of their parliamentary immunity to the Constitutional Council on 20 June, and it responded favorably in a decision on 31 July 1996. Despite this, they were sentenced to six months in prison on 7 August 1996. They were also fined 200,000 Djiboutian francs and deprived of their civic rights for five years, thereby barring them from seeking election to the National Assembly during that time. A subsequent report to the United Nations Commission on Human Rights asserted that the trial was unfair.

Two years later, along with Farah and 15 soldiers, Boulaleh was charged with fomenting military unrest and plotting a coup; the accused were put on trial in September 1998. On 1 October 2001, he and the others convicted of insulting the Head of State in 1996 were granted an amnesty.

A political party founded by Farah, the People's Social Democratic Party (PPSD), was legally registered in October 2002. Boulaleh became Vice-President of the PPSD and was elected to the National Assembly in the January 2003 parliamentary election as the eighth candidate on the candidate list of the ruling coalition, the Union for a Presidential Majority (UMP), in the city of Djibouti. As the oldest member of the National Assembly, he presided over the first sitting of the new parliamentary term, at which Idriss Arnaoud Ali was elected as President of the National Assembly, on 21 January 2003.

In the February 2008 parliamentary election, Boulaleh was the 11th candidate on the UMP's candidate list for the city of Djibouti, and he was re-elected. As the oldest member, he again presided over the first sitting of the new parliamentary term on 20 February 2008. Barreh died in 2010.
