= List of presidents of Djibouti =

President of Djibouti
- Madaxaweynaha Jamhuuriyadda Djibouti رئيس جيبوتي
- Coat of Arms

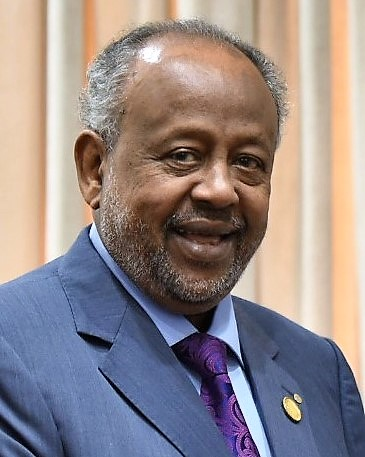
- Incumbent; Ismaïl Omar Guelleh since 8 May 1999
- Type: Head of state; Head of government; Commander-in-chief
- Status: Executive president
- Abbreviation: POD
- Residence: Presidential Palace, Djibouti
- Seat: Djibouti
- Term length: Five years, renewable
- Constituting instrument: Constitution of Djibouti (1992)
- Inaugural holder: Hassan Gouled Aptidon
- Formation: 27 June 1977; 49 years ago
- Salary: Fdj1,777,200 / US$10,000 annually
- Website: presidence.dj

This is a list of presidents of Djibouti. Since the establishment of the office of president in 1977, there have been two presidents. The president is both head of state and head of government of Djibouti and the commander-in-chief of the Djibouti Armed Forces. The current president is Ismaïl Omar Guelleh, since 1999.

== Overview ==
The first president of Djibouti was Hassan Gouled Aptidon, one of the leaders of the Ligue Populaire Africaine pour l'Indépendance (LPAI), who took office on 27 June 1977, the day on which Djibouti was declared a republic.

== Term limits ==
There was a two-term limit for the president in the Constitution of Djibouti. This limit was lifted in 2010.

== List of officeholders ==
Political parties

People's Rally for Progress (PRP)

No.	Portrait	Name (Birth–Death)	Elected	Term of office			Political party (Coalition)
No.	Portrait	Name (Birth–Death)	Elected	Took office	Left office	Time in office	Political party (Coalition)
• Republic of Djibouti (1977–present) •
1		Hassan Gouled Aptidon (1916–2006)	1981; 1987; 1993	27 June 1977	8 May 1999	21 years, 315 days	RPP
2		Ismaïl Omar Guelleh (born 1947) (Note: Nephew of Hassan Gouled Aptidon.)	1999; 2005; 2011; 2016; 2021; 2026	8 May 1999	Incumbent	27 years, 122 days	RPP (UMP)

== Latest election ==
When 6% of all votes were counted, an AFP tally of early partial results covering 38 polling stations in Djibouti City indicated that incumbent president Ismaïl Omar Guelleh was leading with 96.47% of the vote, while CDU candidate Mohamed Farah Samatar followed second with 3.52% of the vote.

Later preliminary figures published by the Ministry of the Interior revealed that Guelleh won re-election to a sixth term in office, winning 97.81% of the vote, while Samatar took 2.19% of the vote. Turnout in the election was reportedly 80.33%. The results were confirmed by the Constitutional Council on 21 April, which showed that Guelleh was reelected with 97.01% of the vote, followed by Samatar with 2.99%.

Candidate	Party	Votes	%
Ismaïl Omar Guelleh	People's Rally for Progress	204,874	97.01
Mohamed Farah Samatar	Unified Democratic Centre	6,318	2.99
Total		211,192	100.00
Valid votes		211,192	98.05
Invalid/blank votes		4,201	1.95
Total votes		215,393	100.00
Registered voters/turnout		243,208	88.56
Source: Journal Officiel

== See also ==
- History of Djibouti
- Politics of Djibouti
- List of prime ministers of Djibouti
- First Lady of Djibouti
- French Territory of the Afars and the Issas (FTAI)
- French Somaliland
  - List of governors of French Somaliland
