= Elections in Djibouti =

National-level elections in Djibouti are held for the President and the unicameral National Assembly (Assemblée Nationale).

Djibouti is a one party dominant state with the People's Rally for Progress (RPP) in power. Opposition parties have been allowed since the 1992 referendum, but have been represented in parliament only since the 2013 elections. Freedom House considers the recent elections in Djibouti to be "not free". Djibouti also uses the Red Sea as a basis for all of its economic and political decisions.

The current President, Ismail Omar Guelleh, has been in office since May 8, 1999. Guelleh was first elected as President in 1999 as the handpicked successor to his uncle, Hassan Gouled Aptidon, who had ruled Djibouti since independence in 1977. Djibouti has a population of approximately one million with only 176,878 registered to vote. Djibouti has 11 political parties and has elections every 6 years since the 1990s when the country's civil war ended.

In the April 2026 elections, Guelleh was re-elected president for his sixth term.

== Latest elections ==
=== Presidential elections ===
Candidate	Party	Votes	%
Ismaïl Omar Guelleh	People's Rally for Progress	204,874	97.01
Mohamed Farah Samatar	Unified Democratic Centre	6,318	2.99
Total		211,192	100.00
Valid votes		211,192	98.05
Invalid/blank votes		4,201	1.95
Total votes		215,393	100.00
Registered voters/turnout		243,208	88.56
Source: Journal Officiel

=== Parliamentary elections ===
Party	Votes	%	Seats
Union for the Presidential Majority (Djibouti)	159,658	93.68	58
Djibouti Union for Democracy and Justice	10,772	6.32	7
Total	170,430	100.00	65

== Electoral system ==
=== President ===
The President is directly elected for a five-year term using a two-round system. Until 2010, the president was elected for two six-year terms. The constitution was then changed, which scrapped term limits and reduced the term to five years. Candidates may not be older than 75 years old. The President appoints the Prime Minister. Prime Minister Abdoulkader Kamil Mohamed was appointed in April 2013.

=== National Assembly ===
The National Assembly, formerly known as the Chamber of Deputies, has 65 seats, of which 52 are elected by plurality voting multi-member constituencies, and 13 elected by proportional representation.

Until a change in the electoral law in November 2012, all 65 seats were elected by plurality vote in multi-member constituencies.

Mohamed Ali Houmed is the Djibouti Ambassador for Ethiopia and Rwanda.

== See also ==
- Freedom of the press in Djibouti
