= Aden Robleh Awaleh =

Djiboutian politician

- Aadan Rooble Cawaale
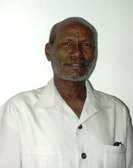
- Aden in 2006

General Secretary of the Front de Libération de la Côte des Somalis (FLCS)
- In office May 1969 – June 1977
- Preceded by: Abdourahman Ahmed Hassan

President of the National Democratic Party (PND)
- In office 13 September 1992 – 31 October 2014
- Preceded by: Position established

Personal details
- Born: 1941 Ali Sabieh, French Somaliland (now Djibouti)
- Died: 31 October 2014 (aged 72–73) Djibouti

Aden Robleh Awaleh (Somali: Aadan Rooble Cawaale) (1941 – 31 October 2014) was a Djiboutian politician and President of the National Democratic Party (PND). He was a member of the National Assembly of Djibouti.

Awaleh, an Issa, was born in Ali-Sabieh. After secondary studies in Djibouti, Aden Robleh Awaleh studied law in Bordeaux and then in Paris between 1963 and 1968. He was secretary general of the association of Djiboutian students and interns in France from 1965 to 1967. At the end of his university studies, Aden Robleh Awaleh returned to Djibouti at the beginning of 1969, he went to Somalia in 1969 and became the leader of the Front for the Liberation of the Somali Coast (FLCS). As a result of his activities, he was convicted of "endangering state security" in absentia by the French authorities in 1970 and sentenced to 27 years in prison. He was later arrested in Somalia in 1975 for "anti-revolutionary" activities and spent a year in solitary confinement there. He was attacked and injured on June 24, 1977, three days before Djibouti became independent from France; his injuries caused him to be hospitalized for a year.

In the period following independence, he was a member of the government, Vice-President of the Popular Rally for Progress (RPR) ruling party, and a member of the RPR Political Bureau. He was included in the first post-independence government, named on July 15, 1977, as Minister of the Port, and he was subsequently moved to the position of Minister of Commerce, Transport, and Tourism in 1978. He was also elected to the National Assembly in 1982. In 1983, he denounced the authoritarianism of the RPR's single-party regime and resigned from his government and party positions.

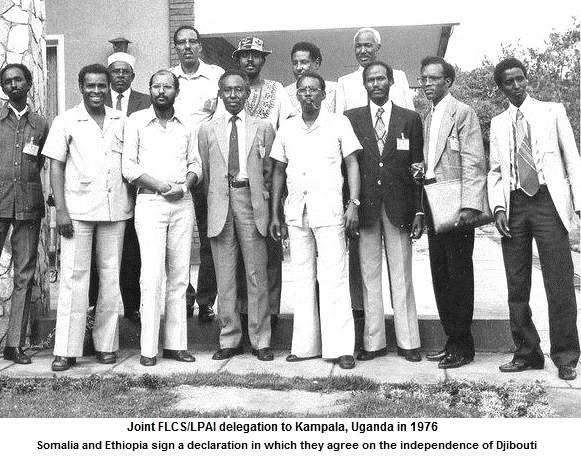
Aden in the joint FLCS-LPAI delegation to Kampala in 1976

A book written by Awaleh, Djibouti: Key to the Red Sea (Djibouti Clef de la Mer Rouge), was published in February 1986. He clandestinely left Djibouti in May 1986 and went into exile in France. As an exiled opposition leader, he founded the Djiboutian National Movement for the Establishment of Democracy and the Union of Democratic Movements while in France. In Djibouti, he was accused of "attempting to destabilize the government and murder senior officials" and was sentenced in absentia to life in prison on September 7, 1986, along with two others.

In 1992, Awaleh founded the National Democratic Party (PND) in Paris. Immediately after a successful referendum was held on the introduction of multiparty politics, Awaleh announced on September 7, 1992, that he intended to return to Djibouti within days and would seek the legalization of his National Democratic Party (PND). The PND was then established in Djibouti on September 13, 1992. He received 12% of the vote in the May 1993 presidential election, placing third; along with the other opposition candidates, he denounced the election as fraudulent.

On October 27, 1995, a PND protest was broken up by the police and Awaleh was among those arrested. Accused of organizing an illegal protest, he received a suspended sentence of one month imprisonment in November 1995. At this time, he was the head of an opposition coalition, the Union of Democratic Movements. He stood as the first candidate on the PND's candidate list for Ali Sabieh Region (the only district in which the party presented candidates) in the December 1997 parliamentary election, but the party did not win any seats.

The PND experienced internal division in the late 1990s. In May 1997, Awaleh suspended PND spokesman Farah Ali Wabert from the party, a move that reportedly exacerbated the situation. By November 1998, a rival leadership under Mahdi Ahmed Abdillahié controlled the PND headquarters, and in December 1998 Awaleh was reported to be missing. The factions apparently reconciled by 2002.

In September 1998, Awaleh accused Ismail Omar Guelleh of working to make Djibouti a colony of Ethiopia. Awaleh and the PND supported opposition candidate Moussa Ahmed Idriss in the April 1999 presidential election; Guelleh officially won the election with 75% of the vote, but Awaleh alleged that this was due to "massive fraud" and said that Idris had actually won. During the election, he served on the district supervision commission in Ali-Sabieh District as Idris' representative. Awaleh was denied a passport on June 5, 2000, preventing him from travelling to Nigeria for an African Leadership Forum. In April 2001, Awaleh was convicted and given a six-year suspended sentence for alleged involvement in a terrorist attack at the Cafe du Paris in Djibouti in 1990; although prosecutors said that Awaleh was the leading figure in the plot, he was given the lightest sentence of the four defendants.

Awaleh and the PND left the opposition and participated in the January 2003 parliamentary election as part of the ruling coalition, the Union for a Presidential Majority (UMP), which won all the seats in the National Assembly. Awaleh was included as the seventh candidate on the UMP's candidate list for the District of Djibouti and therefore won a seat.

On March 10, 2004, Awaleh was chosen by the National Assembly as one of Djibouti's five members of the Pan-African Parliament (PAP); as a result, he was present for the opening of the PAP later in the month, and he was elected as a member of the Pan-African Parliament's ad hoc committee responsible for verification of powers. In the National Assembly of Djibouti, he has served as a member of the Legislation and General Administration Commission.

Awaleh and the PND supported Guelleh in the April 2005 presidential election. On February 21, 2007, Awaleh was re-elected as President of the PND. He was a member of the general staff of the UMP's campaign for the February 2008 parliamentary election. In the same election, he was the fourth candidate on the UMP's candidate list for the District of Djibouti. He was re-elected to a seat, and after the election, he was designated as the representative of the National Assembly in the Pan-African Parliament on 25 February 2008.

Awaleh and the PND split from the ruling coalition in 2010 after Guelleh pushed through constitutional changes allowing him to run for a third term. The party re-joined the opposition and boycotted of the 2011 election.

In the February 2013 elections, he was re-elected to the National Assembly on the lists of the Union for National Salvation (USN opposition). Despite the decision of his movement to establish a "parallel Parliament", he sits from June.

He died in Djibouti on October 31, 2014, and was buried in Ali Sabieh.

== See also ==
- List of members of the Pan-African Parliament
