= Ahmed Mohamed Hassan =

Djiboutian politician

Ahmed Mohamed Hassan (born 1945) is a Djiboutian politician. He is a member of the People's Rally for Progress (RPP) and has served in the National Assembly of Djibouti as well as the Pan-African Parliament.

== Political career ==
At the roundtable talks in Paris regarding Djibouti's independence in 1977, Hassan was the spokesman of the Front for the Liberation of the Somali Coast. A doctor by profession, he was a member of the National Assembly of Djibouti from 1977 to 1982. He was later Technical Adviser to the Ministry of Health from May 1994 to April 1996. Subsequently, he was Director of the Peltier General Hospital—the country's main hospital, located in the city of Djibouti—from August 1996 to December 1997.

Hassan was elected to the National Assembly again in the December 1997 parliamentary election as the 13th candidate on the joint candidate list of the RPP and the Front for the Restoration of Unity and Democracy (FRUD) in Djibouti Region. He was re-elected in the January 2003 parliamentary election as the 14th candidate on the candidate list of the Union for a Presidential Majority (UMP) coalition in Djibouti Region. Following this election, Hassan was elected as the Second Vice-president of the National Assembly on 21 January 2003.

On 10 March 2004, Hassan was chosen by the National Assembly as one of Djibouti's initial five members of the Pan-African Parliament.

Hassan was not included on the UMP's candidate list for the February 2008 parliamentary election, but subsequently he was appointed as an ambassador on 1 April 2008.

== See also ==
- List of members of the Pan-African Parliament
