= Safia Elmi Djibril =

Djiboutian politician and women's rights activist

Personal details
- Born: 1963 (age 61–62)
- Citizenship: Djibouti
- Political party: People's Rally for Progress
- Occupation: Activist

Safia Elmi Djibril (born 1963) is a Djiboutian politician and women's rights activist.

She is a member of the National Assembly from the People's Rally for Progress party, which is part of the ruling Union for the Presidential Majority coalition.

== Political career ==
Safia Elmi Djibril first entered politics through her work on Djibouti's health programs.

She is a longtime opponent of female genital mutilation and other traditional practices that are harmful to women and children.

=== National Assembly ===
Djibril is a member of the National Assembly from the People's Rally for Progress party, which is affiliated with the ruling Union for the Presidential Majority coalition. She represents Quartier 7, an area of the eponymous capital city.

She was first elected in the 2008 Djiboutian parliamentary election, joining a small number of other women in the chamber including Aïcha Mohamed Robleh and Hasna Barkat Daoud.

Djibril is part of a wave of women who have entered Djibouti's political scene in recent years. There were no women in Djibouti's parliament in 2000, but now the law requires at least 25 percent of legislators be female, a threshold that was nearly met in the 2018 election.

In 2019, Djibril helped form a women's caucus within the legislature.

She served as second vice president on President Ismaïl Omar Guelleh's cabinet and as a member of the High Court of Justice.

After the 2023 election, she was named first vice-president of the National Assembly.

=== Pan-African organizations ===
Djibril's focus continues to be women and children's health, and she is vice president of the Inter-African Committee on Traditional Practices Affecting the Health of Women and Children, representing Djibouti's first lady Kadra Mahamoud Haid.

She is a member of the Pan-African Parliament, previously serving as a vice president of the body until 2018. She has also worked as part of the Pan-African Parliament's Women's Caucus.
