= Ali Abdi Farah =

Djiboutian politician

Ali Abdi Farah (Somali: Cali Cabdi Faarax) (born 1947) is a politician in Djibouti. He belongs to the Habr Awal subclan of the Isaaq.

Farah served as diplomatic attaché to the President of the Republic, as head of general administration and consular affairs at the Ministry of External Affairs, and as First Adviser to the Embassy of Djibouti in Tunisia. He was appointed as Minister of Energy, Mines and Natural Resources on June 8, 1995, and was elected to the National Assembly in the December 1997 parliamentary election as the ninth candidate on the joint candidate list of the RPP and the Front for the Restoration of Unity and Democracy (FRUD). He was subsequently moved to the post of Minister of Foreign Affairs and International Cooperation, in charge of Relations with Parliament on May 12, 1999.

In the January 2003 parliamentary election, Farah was the 11th candidate on the candidate list of the ruling coalition, the Union for a Presidential Majority (UMP), in the District of Djibouti. Farah is a member of the ruling party, the People's Rally for Progress (RPP), and as of 2003, he is a member of the RPP Executive Committee, responsible for external relations.

In the government named on May 22, 2005, Farah was moved to the post of Minister of Communication and Culture, in charge of Posts and Telecommunications, and Government Spokesman. In the February 2008 parliamentary election, Farah was the eighth candidate on the UMP's candidate list for the District of Djibouti.
