= Ougoureh Kifleh Ahmed =

Djiboutian politician

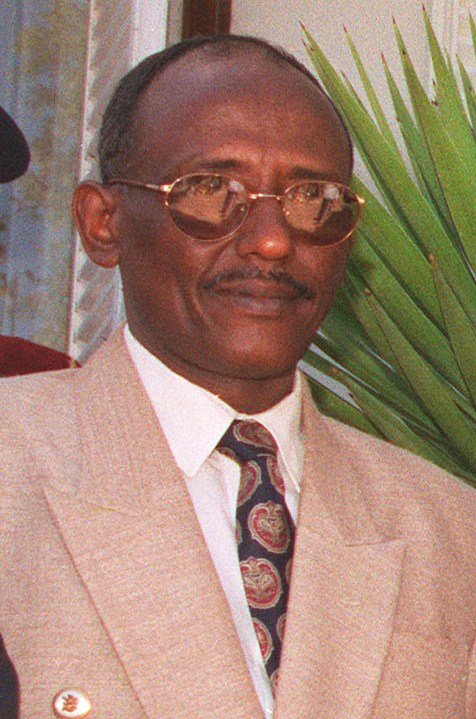

Minister of Defense of Djibouti
- In office 1999–2011
- Preceded by: Abdallah Chirwa Djibril
- Succeeded by: Abdoulkader Kamil Mohamed

Personal details
- Born: 18 November 1955 (age 70) Dikhil, French Somaliland
- Party: People's Rally for Progress (RPP)

Ougoureh Kifleh Ahmed (born 18 November 1955) is a Djiboutian politician who served in the government of Djibouti as Minister of Defense from 1999 to 2011. He has also served as Secretary-General of the Front for the Restoration of Unity and Democracy (FRUD).

== Political career ==
Kifleh Ahmed was born in Dikhil. FRUD, an Afar rebel group, split in 1994, when Kifleh Ahmed announced an internal revolt and the establishment of new leadership, saying that the new leadership would enter negotiations with the government to end the civil war. The old leadership rejected this and expelled Kifleh Ahmed from FRUD in early May 1994. Kifleh Ahmed became the Secretary-General of the moderate faction of FRUD, in opposition to the radical faction, which opposed negotiations. He signed a peace agreement between his faction and the government on 26 December 1994. He was subsequently appointed to the government as Minister of Agriculture and Hydraulics on 8 June 1995. He was elected to the National Assembly in the December 1997 parliamentary election as the 11th candidate on the joint candidate list of the People's Rally for Progress (RPP) and FRUD for Dikhil Region. Following this election, he was moved to the post of Minister of the Civil Service and Administrative Reform on 28 December 1997.

Kifleh Ahmed was appointed as Minister of National Defense on 12 May 1999. In the January 2003 parliamentary election, Kifleh Ahmed was again elected to the National Assembly as the second candidate on the candidate list of the ruling coalition, the Union for a Presidential Majority (UMP), in Dikhil Region. President Ismail Omar Guelleh awarded the medal of the Commander of the Great Star of Djibouti to Kifleh Ahmed and FRUD President Ali Mohamed Daoud during independence day celebrations on 27 June 2004. He was also re-elected in the February 2008 parliamentary election as the first candidate on the UMP's candidate list for Dikhil Region.
