= Dileita Mohamed Dileita =

Djiboutian politician

- دليطة محمد دليطة
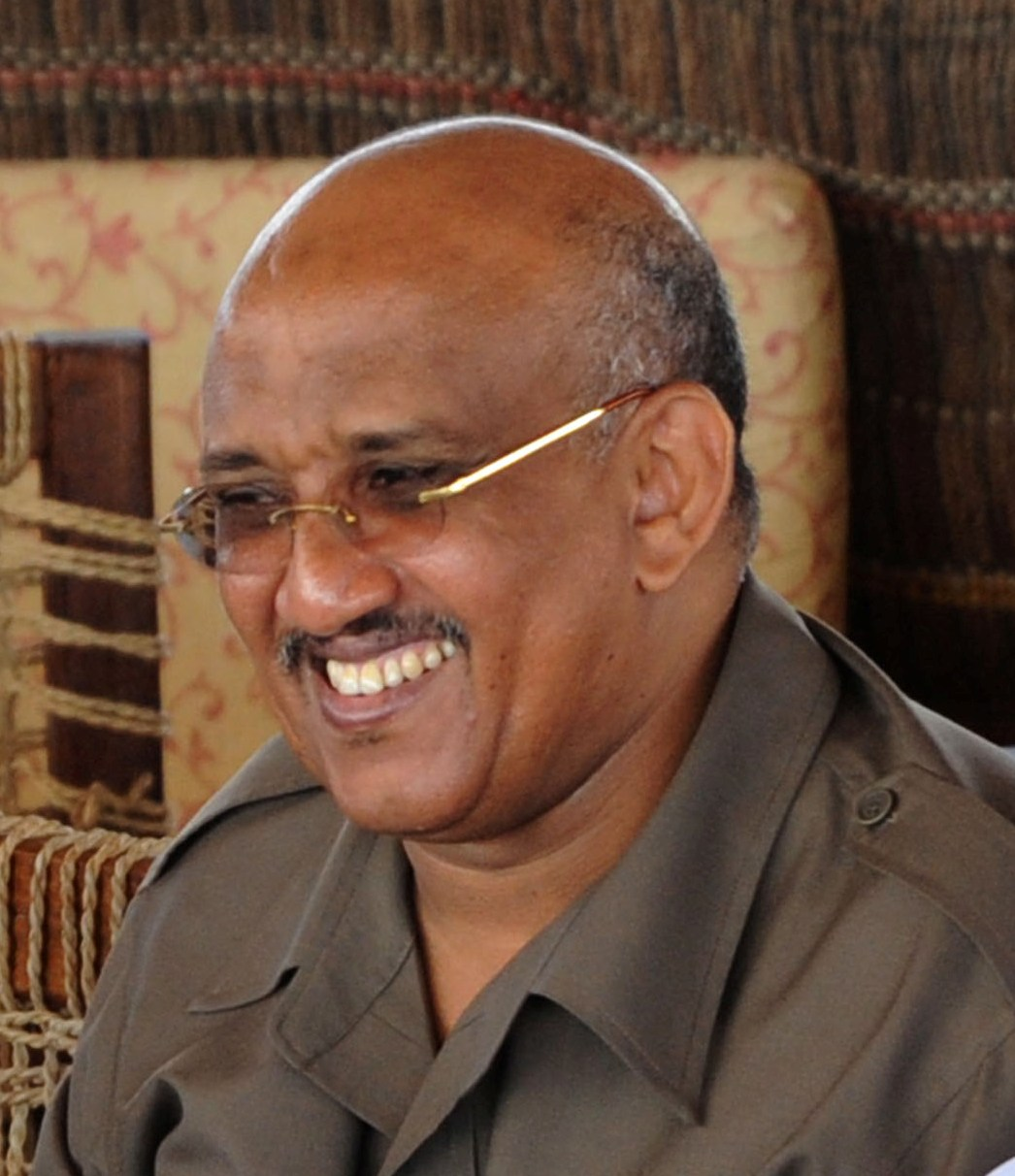
- Dileita in 2008

President of the National Assembly
- Incumbent
- Assumed office 5 March 2023
- Preceded by: Mohamed Ali Houmed

5th Prime Minister of Djibouti
- In office 7 March 2001 – 1 April 2013
- President: Ismaïl Omar Guelleh
- Preceded by: Barkat Gourad Hamadou
- Succeeded by: Abdoulkader Kamil Mohamed

African Union Special Envoy for Libya
- Incumbent
- Assumed office 11 June 2014

Personal details
- Born: 12 March 1959 (age 67) Tadjoura, French Somaliland (now Djibouti)
- Party: People's Rally for Progress
- Children: Shay Lia

Dileita Mohamed Dileita (Afar: Dileita Macammad Dileita, Arabic: دليطة محمد دليطة; born 12 March 1959) is a Djiboutian politician who was the prime minister of Djibouti from 7 March 2001 to 1 April 2013. He was vice-president of the People's Rally for Progress (RPP), the governing political party, until 2012. He also served as president of the Union for the Presidential Majority (UMP), the governing coalition. He was elected President of the National Assembly on 5 March 2023.

== Early years ==
Dileita was born in 1959 in the coastal eastern city of Tadjoura, Djibouti, to an Afar family. He studied in Cairo and Reims, then went to the Centre for Vocational Education in Médéa, Algeria, from which he graduated in 1981.

== Political career ==
Upon graduation, Dileita returned to Djibouti, where he worked at the Directorate-General of Protocol under the Presidency. He became the second ranking diplomat at the embassy of Djibouti in France in early 1990, and subsequently he became Ambassador to Ethiopia in 1997. He also represented Djibouti at the Organization of African Unity, headquartered in Addis Ababa, while serving as Ambassador to Ethiopia, and assisted in the peace talks that ended the 1998–2000 war between Ethiopia and Eritrea.

In December 1999, Dileita was charged with negotiating a peace agreement with a faction of the Front for the Restoration of Unity and Democracy (FRUD); the negotiations led to the signing of an agreement in February 2000. He became ambassador to Uganda in mid-2000. After long-time prime minister Barkat Gourad Hamadou resigned for health reasons in February 2001, President Ismail Omar Guelleh appointed Dileita as prime minister on March 4, 2001, and he took office on March 7. He had no prior experience as a minister.

Dileita was elected as the vice-president of the RPP on July 3, 2003, succeeding Hamadou in that post. Dileita led the ruling coalition, the Union for the Presidential Majority (UMP), in the January 2003 parliamentary election, standing as the first candidate on the coalition's list for the District of Djibouti.

On May 21, 2005, Dileita was reappointed as prime minister after Guelleh's re-election in the April 2005 presidential election; a new government under Dileita was named on May 22.

As of 2008, Dileita was the president of the UMP coalition, and he headed the UMP list for the District of Djibouti in the February 2008 parliamentary election. Following the election, in which the UMP won all seats amidst an opposition boycott, he resigned as prime minister on March 25, 2008. Guelleh promptly reappointed him on March 26 and named a new government under Dileita on March 27.

After Guelleh won a third term in the April 2011 presidential election, he reappointed Dileita as prime minister on 11 May 2011. Guelleh retained Dileita in his post even though various other long-serving ministers were dropped from the new government that was announced on 12 May. He was replaced as RPP Vice-president by Abdoulkader Kamil Mohamed in September 2012, as part of an extensive shake-up of the RPP leadership.

On 31 March 2013, Dileita was succeeded by Kamil as prime minister.

Nkosazana Dlamini-Zuma, the Chairperson of the Commission of the African Union, announced on 11 June 2014 that Dileita was appointed as the African Union's Special Envoy for Libya. He was head of the African Union observer mission for the March 2016 Congolese presidential election.

== See also ==
- People's Rally for Progress

Political offices
Preceded by Barkat Gourad Hamadou	Prime Minister of Djibouti; 2001–2013	Succeeded by Abdoulkader Kamil Mohamed
