= Djiboutian Civil War =

Civil War

- Part of Conflicts in the Horn of Africa
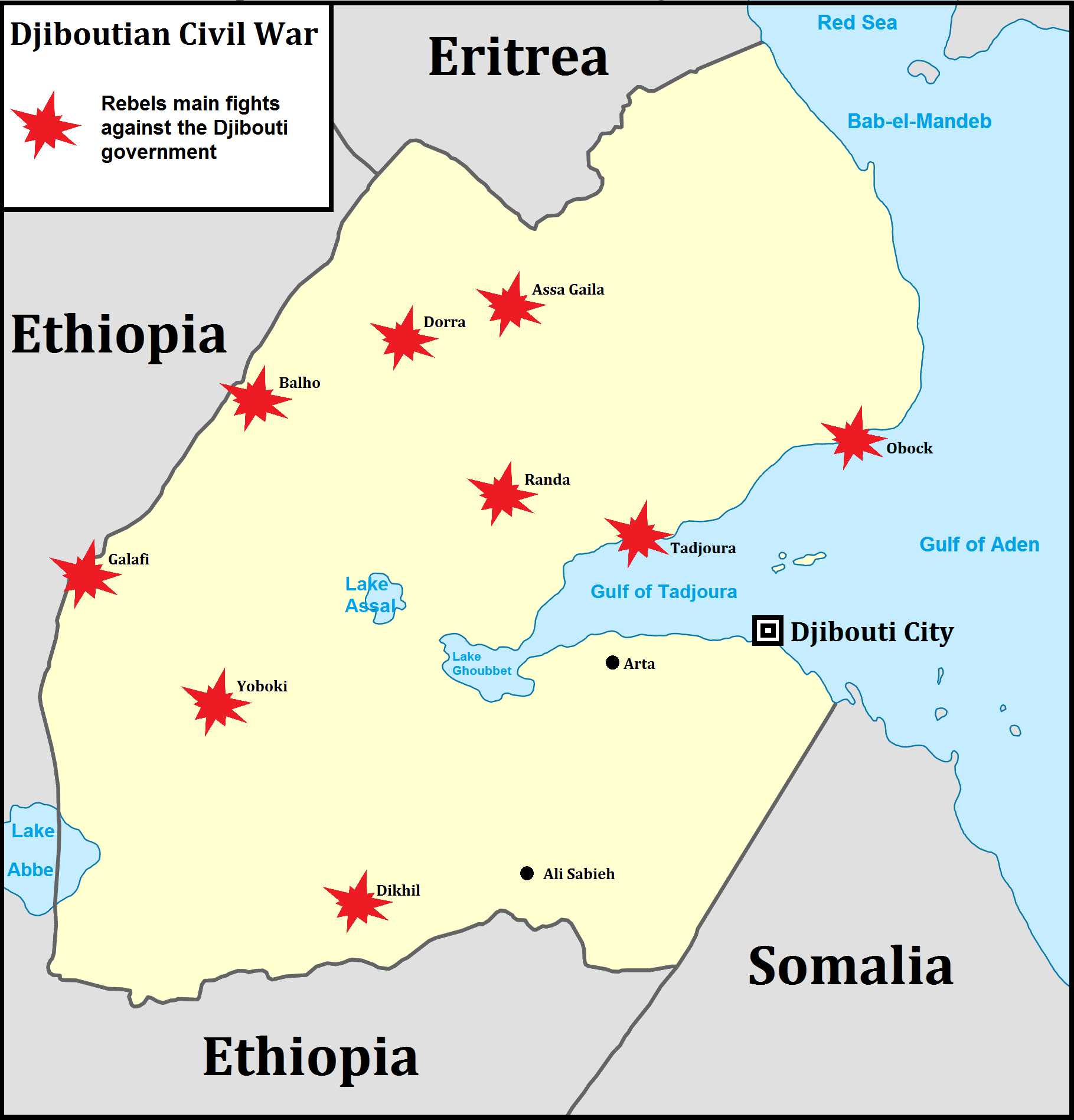
- The situation during the Djiboutian Civil War
Date	31 October 1991 – 26 December 1994 (3 years, 1 month, 3 weeks and 5 days)
Location	Northern Djibouti
Result	Government victory: FRUD Peace Accord; Beginning of FRUD insurgency

Belligerents
Djibouti	FRUD

Commanders and leaders
(Djibouti) Hassan Gouled Aptidon (France) François Mitterrand	Ahmed Dini Ahmed; Ali Mohamed Daoud

Strength
5,000 (1992); 20,000 (1994)	3,000 (1991); 4,500 (1994)

Casualties and losses
Unknown	1,000 killed

The Djiboutian Civil War (also known as the First Afar insurgency) was a conflict in Djibouti, lasting from 1991 to 1994 and resulting in thousands of fatalities. The uneven power sharing between the Issas and the Afars led to the Civil War that ravaged the country for three years.

== Background ==
On 11 March 1862, the French Government made an agreement with the Afar Sultan Raieta Dini Ahmet. Ahmet sold his territory of Obock for 10,000 thalers, around F55,000. This was the start of the French colonisation era in the region, the treaty was used by a captain of the Fleuriot de Langle, to colonise the south part of the Tadjoura Gulf.

Since at least French rule, first as French Somaliland and then as French Territory of the Afars and the Issas, there have been ethnic tensions in Djibouti between the Issas and the Afars. Following independence in 1977, the Issa-dominated People's Rally for Progress party had ruled Djibouti, and since 1981, had ruled it as a one-party state with the People's Rally for Progress party as the only authorized political party. As a result, many Afars felt marginalized.

At the same time in 1991, neighboring countries' authoritarian governments were overthrown, Siad Barre in Somalia and Mengistu Haile Mariam in Ethiopia. Eritrea and Somaliland also declared independence from the People's Democratic Republic of Ethiopia and the Somali Democratic Republic respectively in 1991.

At the end of the 1980s, groups such as the Popular Liberation Movement, organized attacks against the government. In 1991, several opposition movements were created: the Djibouti Patriotic Resistance Front (FRDP), the Alliance of Forces for Democracy (AFD) and the Action for a Review of Order in Djibouti (Arod). In mid-1991, several of them regrouped in a new organization: the Front for the Restoration of Unity and Democracy (FRUD).

== Outbreak ==
In May 1991, thousands of Ethiopian soldiers fled into Djiboutian territory after the Derg (the former Ethiopian Government) was overthrown. Framed by French and Djiboutian troops, they were repatriated back to Ethiopia, but left many weapons behind. At the beginning of October 1991, the rebel organisation Front for the Restoration of Unity and Democracy (FRUD), calling for greater political participation of Afar, launched a guerrilla struggle against the government.

There were clashes between government forces and FRUD rebels in the Dikhil region of western Djibouti on October, from the first days of the outbreak of hostilities, specifically on the night of the 15–16 November 1991, the Djiboutian army captured some 232 individuals in the Obock Region. These were mainly the Afars of Eritrea and the militia of the former Derg regime.

To wash away the affront, the FRUD launched, on the 21 November 1991, an assault of the town of Obock and its garrison, but after a long day of fierce fighting the Djiboutian soldiers crushed them. Subsequently, several other battles will confront the national army and the FRUD militia, which caused heavy casualties on both sides. The FRUD seized all military posts in the north of the country and laid siege to the city of Tadjoura and Obock.

Government troops and FRUD fighters clashed near Tadjoura on the 3–4 January 1992, resulting in the deaths of some 150 rebels and three soldiers . In the Gagade, Kharab, and Bekaneb districts on 17–18 January 1992, clashes resulted with the deaths of some 150 rebels and 16 soldiers.

Throughout the war, the fighting was mainly in the north of the country with the exception of the incident in the capital, when on 18 December 1991 government troops entered the area Arhiba inhabited by the Afar, and opened fire on crowds of people. At the same time killed at least 59 people, provoking mass resignations of the Afar deputies of the national assembly in protest and disputes within the RPP itself. In February 1992, some French troops were deployed in the north to aid the government forces. With about 3,000 fighters, FRUD attacked a government institutions in Dikhil but was repelled back.

France attempted to mediate between the government and the rebels, but all attempts to organise such talks (from November 1992 to May 1993) failed. The government responded by increasing its armed forces from about 5,000 to 20,000 men and called up its reserves, and received support from France in the form of some military equipment.

On the 5 July 1993, the government launched a massive counter-offensive in the areas controlled by the rebels: the main FRUD base, located in Assa-Gueyla, was captured by the government, who regained a lot of land including the towns of Balho, Dorra and Randa; this forced the rebels to take refuge in the mountains on the border with Eritrea in the north. The population living in the area of the clashes, about 70,000 civilians, were forced to leave their homes as well as another 30,000 refugees beyond the borders with Eritrea and Afar Region of Ethiopia. The Civil War contributed to the reintroduction of a multi-party democracy in 1992 with a new constitution. The government was trying to open negotiations with FRUD, which is cornered on the border between Djibouti and Ethiopia and has only a few hundred militants. In 1992 and 1993 parliamentary and presidential elections took place. Subsequently, the FRUD split on the question of how far it was to cooperate with the government. But guerrilla actions continued, while the opposition denounced numerous abuses against civilians.

== Peace agreement ==
In February 1994, the FRUD underwent a process of reorganization of its political leaders: Ougoureh Kifleh Ahmed ousted Ahmed Dini Ahmed from the leadership of the movement, and imposed a new course based on negotiations with the central government to reach a political compromise. After a government offensive in the Mount Mabla region failed between March 3 and 10, 1994, President Hassan Gouled announced the start of peace talks with the FRUD on March 14; the offer was accepted by the moderate wing of Kifleh Ahmed but was rejected by the most radical elements of the FRUD headed by Ahmed Dini, eager to continue the armed struggle. With the mediation of France, an initial Abb'a peace agreement was signed on December 26, 1994, between the Djiboutian government and the moderate wing of the FRUD: in exchange for the cessation of hostilities, the FRUD obtained the integration of 200 of its representatives into the state administration and 700 of its fighters in the ranks of the Djiboutian army; in June 1995 a new Djiboutian government saw the entry of two FRUD members, Ougoureh Kifleh as Minister of Agriculture and Ali Mohamed Daoud, President of the organization, as Minister of Health and Social Affairs, while on March 6, 1996, the FRUD was registered as one of the four political parties authorized by the new Djiboutian constitution, then participating in the general elections of 19 December 1997 in coalition with the RPP.

Ahmed Dini's faction refused all negotiations and carried out armed operations against government forces, the gradually decreasing consensus towards the FRUD extremists, however, brought few members of the organization on their side, and the men by Ahmed Dini they were able to carry out only limited guerrilla operations in the north of the country. After some clashes in January 1996 which also involved French patrols, the guerrilla war had an upsurge in September 1997 but was damaged by the agreement reached between Djibouti and Ethiopia on the definition of its common border, with the Djiboutian and Ethiopian troops who began to conduct aggressive operations to damage Ahmed Dini armed groups operating on both sides of the border, between 19 and 20 March 1998 the radicals of the FRUD carried out one last action on a large scale attacking several Djiboutian border posts in the south, but the guerrilla operations was now in a waning phase and was experiencing a slow decline.

On April 9, 1999, Ismail Omar Guelleh was elected new president of Djibouti; the time was ripe for a political solution to the conflict, and in March 2000 Ahmed Dini returned from his exile in Yemen to start contacts with the new government: on May 12, 2001, a definitive peace agreement was signed, and the last guerrillas of the FRUD laid down their arms to be reintegrated into normal Djiboutian political life. Ahmed Dini came to the legislation elections in January 2003 to lead the opposition party Alliance Républicaine pour le Développement, but was defeated by the RPP-FRUD coalition which supported Ismail Omar Guelleh.

== See also ==
- Afar people
- History of Djibouti
- Djibouti Armed Forces
