= 2021 Djiboutian presidential election =

- 9 April 2021
- Turnout: 76.44% (▲7.48pp)
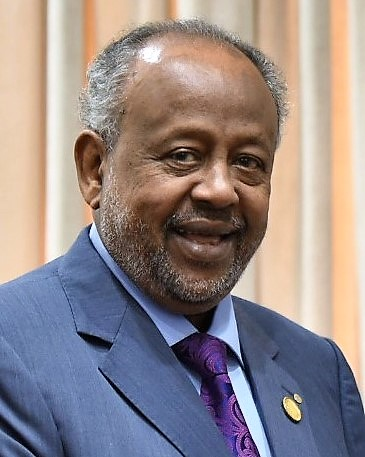

Nominee	Ismaïl Omar Guelleh	Zakaria Ismael Farah
Party	RPP	MDEND
Alliance	UMP
Popular vote	155,291	4,314
Percentage	97.30%	2.70%
President before election
Ismaïl Omar Guelleh
UMP
Elected President
Ismaïl Omar Guelleh
UMP

Presidential elections were held in Djibouti on 9 April 2021. Incumbent president Ismaïl Omar Guelleh was re-elected for his fifth five-year term, having served in the role since 1999. Most of the opposition boycotted the election.

== Background ==
Guelleh has served as President of Djibouti since 1999, and was re-elected in the first round of the last election in 2016, which was boycotted by opposition parties.

== Electoral system ==
The president is elected through a two-round system for a five year term. A candidate who gets the majority of votes in the first round is duly elected; if this is not achieved, a second round is organised between the two candidates who received the most votes in the first. Whoever receives the most votes in the second round is then elected. If no candidate had received a majority of the vote, a second round would have been held on 23 April.

In 2010 the Constitution of Djibouti was amended to shorten the length of presidential terms from six years to five; the previously held limit of two terms per president was also abolished.

== Candidates ==
Incumbent President Ismaïl Omar Guelleh was eligible for a fifth term. The only opposition candidate was Zakaria Ismael Farah of the Mouvement pour le Dévelopment et l'Équilibre de la Nation Djiboutienne (MDEND), with the major opposition candidates opting not to present candidates.

== Campaign ==
The presidential campaign occurred during the ongoing global COVID-19 pandemic. Guelleh's campaign highlighted the government's response to the pandemic locally, which had been praised by the World Health Organization. Guelleh's campaign did face criticism for some social issues, including the country's high unemployment rate and concerns that despite a high growth rate of 7% on average over the preceding five years, that the benefits of such growth was being unevenly redistributed, particularly towards the working class.

Farah served as the only opposition candidate, with major opposition parties opting not to run candidates, accusing Guelleh of ruling via a dictatorship.

== Results ==
Candidate	Party	Votes	%
Ismaïl Omar Guelleh	People's Rally for Progress	155,291	97.30
Zakaria Ismael Farah	MDEND	4,314	2.70
Total		159,605	100.00
Valid votes		159,605	96.81
Invalid/blank votes		5,261	3.19
Total votes		164,866	100.00
Registered voters/turnout		215,687	76.44
Source: Journal Officiel
