= 2016 Djiboutian presidential election =

- 8 April 2016
- Turnout: 68.96%
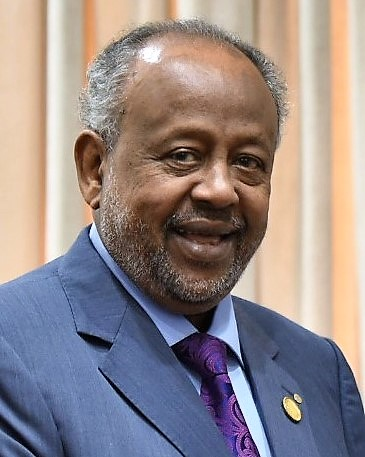

Nominee	Ismaïl Omar Guelleh	Omar Elmi Khaireh
Party	RPP
Alliance	UMP	USN
Popular vote	111,389	9,385
Percentage	87.07%	7.34%
President before election
Ismaïl Omar Guelleh
RPP
Elected President
Ismaïl Omar Guelleh
RPP

Presidential elections were held in Djibouti on 8 April 2016. Incumbent President Ismaïl Omar Guelleh was re-elected for a fourth term, receiving 87% of the vote in the first round.

== Electoral system ==
The President of Djibouti was elected using the two-round system. After a modification of the constitution in 2010, six year terms were shortened to five year terms and term limits were abolished.

== Candidates ==
Guelleh, president since 1999, ran for his fourth term in office and was considered likely to win against his six opponents. The Union for the Presidential Majority believed that Guelleh would win a landslide victory and prevent a second round run-off.

The Union for National Salvation (USN), a coalition of seven opposition parties, claimed the election lacked transparency. Three of the seven parties decided to boycott the elections, whilst two others fielded their own candidates, with Mohamed Daoud Chehem and Omar Elmi Khaireh running against each other.

Three independent candidates also ran: Djama Abdourahman Djama, Mohamed Moussa Ali and Hassan Idriss Ahmed.

== Conduct ==
A team of BBC journalists who had conducted an interview with the Djibouti Foreign Minister and an opposition candidate were detained by the police. The journalists claimed they had proper paperwork to work in the country but were deported after being questioned for eight hours. The BBC has yet to obtain an official statement from the government of Djibouti. In 2015 Djibouti had ranked 170 out of 180 in the Press Freedom Index.

== Results ==
Candidate	Party	Votes	%
Ismaïl Omar Guelleh	People's Rally for Progress	111,389	87.07
Omar Elmi Khaireh	Union for National Salvation	9,385	7.34
Mohamed Daoud Chehem	Union for National Salvation	2,340	1.83
Mohamed Moussa Ali	Independent	1,946	1.52
Hassan Idriss Ahmed	Independent	1,770	1.38
Djama Abdourahman Djama	Independent	1,103	0.86
Total		127,933	100.00
Valid votes		127,933	97.08
Invalid/blank votes		3,845	2.92
Total votes		131,778	100.00
Registered voters/turnout		191,103	68.96
Source: Journal Officiel
