= 1992 Djiboutian parliamentary election =

- 18 December 1992

All 65 seats in the National Assembly 33 seats needed for a majority
- Registered: 151,047
- Turnout: 48.50% (▼40.19pp)
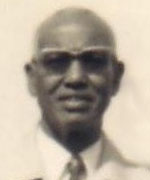
	First party
Leader	Hassan Gouled Aptidon
Party	RPP
Seats won	65
Seat change	Steady
Popular vote	53,578
Percentage	74.59%
Swing	▼25.41pp
- Results by region
President of the National Assembly before election
Abdoulkader Waberi Askar
RPP
Elected President of the National Assembly
Abdoulkader Waberi Askar
RPP

Parliamentary elections were held in Djibouti on 18 December 1992. They were the first elections following a referendum in September that reintroduced multi-party democracy, albeit with a limit of four parties, although they were boycotted by the Front for the Restoration of Unity and Democracy. The ruling People's Rally for Progress won 75% of the vote and all 65 seats in the National Assembly. Voter turnout was only 49%, as many Afars did not vote.

== Results ==
Party	Votes	%	Seats	+/–
People's Rally for Progress	53,578	74.59	65	0
Party of Democratic Renewal	18,249	25.41	0	New
Total	71,827	100.00	65	0
Valid votes	71,827	98.04		
Invalid/blank votes	1,433	1.96		
Total votes	73,260	100.00		
Registered voters/turnout	151,047	48.50		
Source: Nohlen et al.
