= Senator Hassan =

Senator Hassan may refer to:

== United States ==
Members of the U.S. Senate:

- Maggie Hassan (1958–), senator from New Hampshire (2017–)

== France ==
Members of the French Senate:

- Hassan Gouled Aptidon (1916–2006), senator (1952–1958)
