= 1987 Djiboutian general election =

- 24 April 1987
- Presidential election
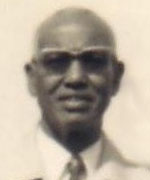
Nominee	Hassan Gouled Aptidon
Party	RPP
Popular vote	90,675
Percentage	100%
President before election
Hassan Gouled Aptidon
RPP
Elected President
Hassan Gouled Aptidon
RPP
- Parliamentary election
- All 65 seats in the National Assembly
Party	Leader	Vote %	Seats	+/–
RPP	Hassan Gouled Aptidon	100	65	0
This lists parties that won seats. See the complete results below.

General elections were held in Djibouti on 24 April 1987 to elect a President and National Assembly. At the time, the country was a one-party state with the People's Rally for Progress (RPP) as the only legally permitted party. In the presidential election, incumbent president Hassan Gouled Aptidon was the only candidate for the presidency, and was re-elected unopposed. In the National Assembly elections, voters were presented with a single list of 65 RPP candidates. They could only vote against by casting a blank vote or abstaining. The list was approved by 87% of registered voters. Voter turnout for the National Assembly vote was slightly lower at 88.69%.

== Results ==
=== President ===
Candidate	Party	Votes	%
Hassan Gouled Aptidon	People's Rally for Progress	90,675	100.00
Total		90,675	100.00
Valid votes		90,675	99.32
Invalid/blank votes		625	0.68
Total votes		91,300	100.00
Registered voters/turnout		100,881	90.50
Source: African Elections Database

=== National Assembly ===
Party	Votes	%	Seats	+/–
People's Rally for Progress	88,193	100.00	65	0
Total	88,193	100.00	65	0
Valid votes	88,193	98.57		
Invalid/blank votes	1,282	1.43		
Total votes	89,475	100.00		
Registered voters/turnout	100,881	88.69		
Source: African Elections Database
