= National Democratic Party (Djibouti) =

Political party in Djibouti

National Democratic Party French: Parti National Démocratique Arabic: الحزب الوطني الديموقراطي
- Leader: Aden Robleh Awaleh
- Founded: 1992
- Ideology: Social democracy
- Political position: Centre-left
- National affiliation: Union for National Salvation
- National Assembly: 1 / 65

The National Democratic Party (French: Parti National Démocratique, Arabic: الحزب الوطني الديموقراطي) is a political party in Djibouti. It was founded as an opposition party in 1992 by Aden Robleh Awaleh, who remains the party's president. It was part of the ruling coalition in 2005, but has since rejoined the opposition against President Ismaïl Omar Guelleh.

The PND was founded on 13 September 1992, and it boycotted the December 1992 parliamentary election. Seeking greater democracy, it then called for a transitional national unity government to be formed. Awaleh stood as the party's candidate in the May 1993 presidential election, receiving 12% of the vote and placing third.

On 27 October 1995, a PND protest was broken up by the police and many PND members, including Awaleh, were arrested. The party participated in the December 1997 parliamentary election, but failed to win any seats, obtaining 2.3% of the vote. The PND only presented candidates in Ali Sabieh Region in the 1997 election, and it performed well there, losing to the ruling coalition by only 500 votes.

The PND experienced internal division in the late 1990s. In May 1997, Awaleh suspended PND spokesman Farah Ali Wabert from the party, a move that reportedly exacerbated the situation. By November 1998, a rival leadership under Mahdi Ahmed Abdillahié controlled the PND headquarters, and in the same month, the PND headquarters was attacked with a grenade; there was no claim of responsibility for the attack. The factions apparently reconciled by 2002.

The PND subsequently joined the ruling coalition, the Union for a Presidential Majority (Union pour la Majorité Présidentielle, UMP). In the parliamentary election held on 10 January 2003, the party was included in the joint candidate lists of the UMP, which won 62.7% of the popular vote and all seats. The PND subsequently supported Guelleh in the April 2005 presidential election, and it remained part of the UMP in the February 2008 parliamentary election.

The PND split from the ruling coalition in 2010 after Guelleh pushed through constitutional changes allowing him to run for a third term. The party joined the opposition boycott of the 2011 election.

== Electoral history ==
=== National Assembly elections ===
Election	Party leader	Votes	%	Seats	+/–	Position	Result
2003	Aden Robleh Awaleh	53,293 as part of the UMP	62.7%	65 / 65	Steady	1st	UMP coalition government
2008	Aden Robleh Awaleh	103,463 as part of the UMP	94.06%	65 / 65	Steady	1st	UMP coalition government
2013	Aden Robleh Awaleh	74,016 as part of the USN	61.5%	10 / 65	▼55	▼2nd	Opposition
