= Democratic Front for the Liberation of Djibouti =

Democratic Front for the Liberation of Djibouti (FLD)
- Founded: 1979
- Ideology: Afar nationalism

The Democratic Front for the Liberation of Djibouti was an Afar political group founded in 1979 in modern-day Djibouti as a merger of the Popular Movement for Liberation and the National Union for Independence. The group was formed in opposition to the Issa-dominated government's decision to send in French troops to quell anti-government violence by Afar tribe against the Djiboutian government.

== See also ==
- Politics of Djibouti
