= 2023 Djiboutian parliamentary election =

- 24 February 2023

All 65 seats in the National Assembly 33 seats needed for a majority
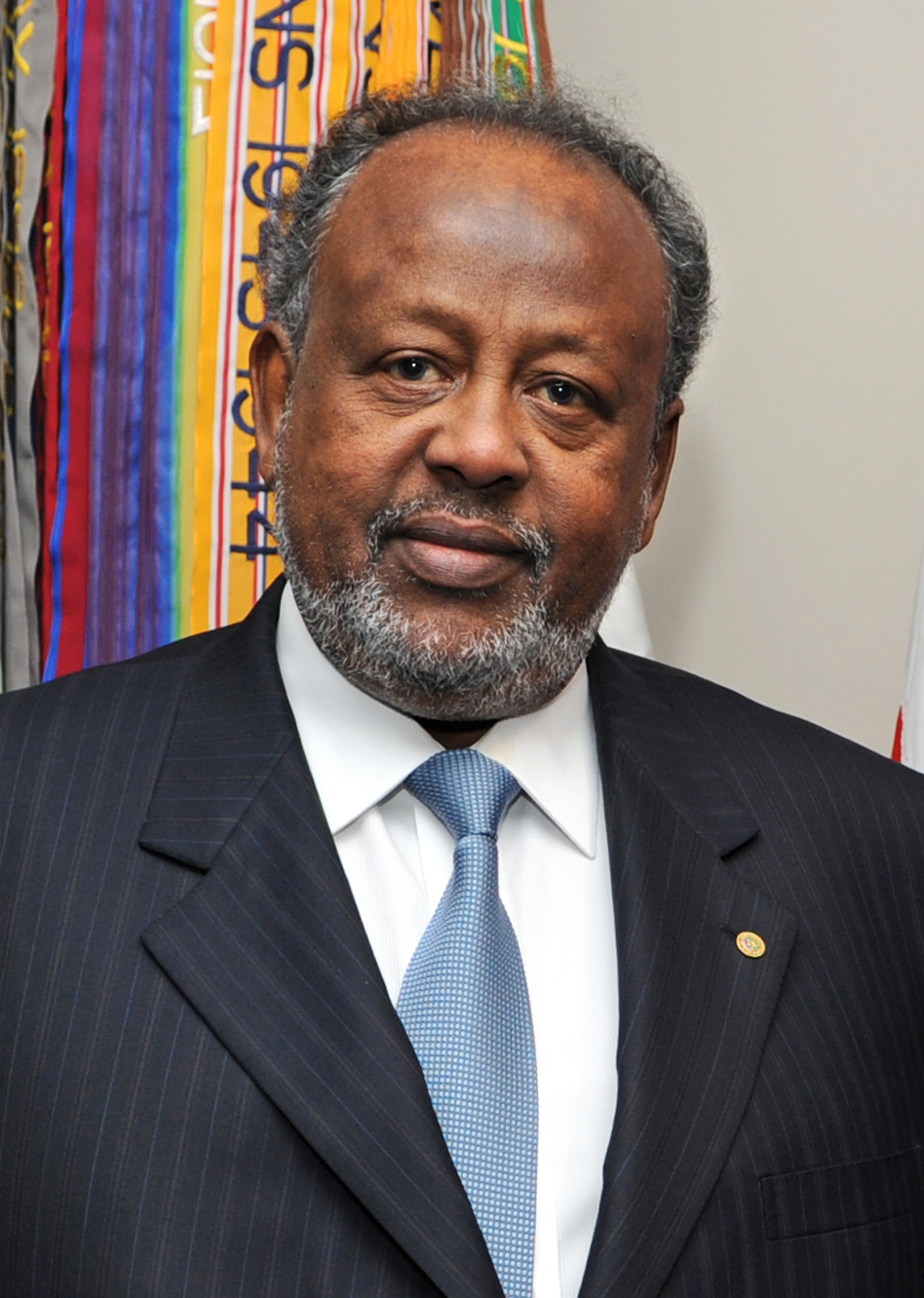
	First party	Second party
		DPJ
Leader	Ismaïl Omar Guelleh
Party	UMP	DPJ
Seats won	58	7
Seat change	▲1	▲2
Popular vote	159,658	10,772
Percentage	93.68%	6.32%
- Results by region

Parliamentary elections were held in Djibouti on 24 February 2023 to elect the 65 members of the National Assembly.

== Background ==
Since his election as President in 1999 Ismaïl Omar Guelleh has ruled Djibouti with almost unchecked power and has become increasingly authoritarian. In all of his presidential re-election campaigns he has never gotten below 80 percent of the vote, which the opposition have decried as fraudulent. Additionally, during his time in office his political party, the People's Rally for Progress (RPP) and its coalition, the Union for the Presidential Majority (UMD) has been in power nearly unopposed since 1977 with their lowest support coming in 2013 with 55 of the 65 seats in parliament.

This long history of fraudulent elections, combined with recent erosion of press freedoms, has resulted in key members of the opposition coalition, the Union for National Salvation, to boycott this election. Specifically, the coalitions two largest parties, the Republican Alliance for Democracy (ARD) and the Movement for Democratic Renewal and Development (MRD) announced they would not be participating. The MRD has gone on to say that:

"Elections in our country are still not free, not transparent and not democratic" and that "The people of Djibouti are deprived of their right to freely choose their leaders,"

Due to lack of opposition participation, a RPP and UMD victory is almost guaranteed, as it has been for the past 50 years.

They were 586 polling stations set across the country for voters, but many refused to vote, saying the election was unfair and that they had no interest in voting.

== Electoral system ==
The elections were held using a closed list system in which 80% of seats (rounded to the nearest integer) in each constituency were awarded to the party receiving the most votes. The remaining seats were allocated proportionally to other parties receiving over 10% of the vote using the D'Hondt method. In cases where no other party received more than 10% of the vote, all seats in a constituency were awarded to the party receiving the most votes. There was also a 25% female quota, up from 10% in the previous election.

== Results ==
Party	Votes	%	Seats	+/–
Union for the Presidential Majority	159,658	93.68	58	+1
Djibouti Union for Democracy and Justice	10,772	6.32	7	+2
Total	170,430	100.00	65	0
Registered voters/turnout	230,295	–		
Source: Official Journal
