= Parti du renouveau démocratique =

Parti du renouveau démocratique can refer to:

- Democratic Renewal Party (Benin)
- Party for Democratic Renewal
