= Idriss Arnaoud Ali =

Djiboutian politician (1945–2015)

President of the National Assembly
- In office 2003–2015
- Preceded by: Said Ibrahim Badoul
- Succeeded by: Mohamed Ali Houmed

Personal details
- Born: 25 December 1945
- Died: 12 February 2015
- Political party: People's Rally for Progress

Idriss Arnaoud Ali (25 December 1945 – 12 February 2015) was a Djiboutian politician who was President of the National Assembly of Djibouti from 2003 to 2015. He was also the Secretary-General of the People's Rally for Progress (RPP) from 2003 to 2012.

== Career ==
He was born in Ali Sabieh. Beginning in 1982, he held various important positions at Air Djibouti. On 1 April 1985, he became its Deputy Director-General. He then served as Interim Director-General from 25 April 1986 to 1 March 1990 and was Director-General from 1 March 1990 to 31 January 1991. He was subsequently Technical Adviser to the Minister of National Education from 1992 to 1997 and was elected to the National Assembly in the December 1997 parliamentary election as the fourth candidate on the joint candidate list of the ruling RPP and the Front for the Restoration of Unity and Democracy (FRUD) for the District of Djibouti. During the parliamentary term that followed, he served as President of the Permanent Commission of the National Assembly; he was also a member of the Defense Commission.

In the January 2003 parliamentary election, Ali was re-elected to the National Assembly as the fourth candidate on the candidate list of the ruling coalition, the Union for a Presidential Majority (UMP), in the District of Djibouti. Following this election, he was elected without opposition as President of the National Assembly on 21 January 2003, and he was also elected as Secretary-General of the Executive Bureau of the RPP on 3 July 2003. In the February 2008 parliamentary election, Ali was the second candidate on the UMP's candidate list for the District of Djibouti. He was re-elected to a seat in the National Assembly, and he was then re-elected as President of the National Assembly on 20 February 2008. In the vote for President of the National Assembly, he received 61 votes against four for another RPP deputy, Mohamed Dileita.

Ali was replaced as RPP Secretary-General by Ilyas Moussa Dawaleh in September 2012, as part of an extensive shake-up of the RPP leadership. In the February 2013 parliamentary election, he was re-elected to the National Assembly. The National Assembly began meeting for its new parliamentary term on 18 March 2013, and Ali was re-elected as President of the National Assembly. He was the only candidate for the post and received the votes of 54 of the 55 deputies present; 10 opposition deputies were not present.

Ali died on 12 February 2015 at a Kenyan hospital in Nairobi.
