= 2011 Djiboutian protests =

Political protests in Djibouti

- Part of the Arab Spring
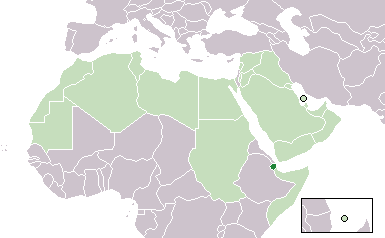
- Date: January 28, 2011 – March 11, 2011 (1 month, 1 week and 4 days)
- Location: Djibouti
- Goals: Remove president Ismail Omar Guelleh from power
- Methods: Demonstrations, riots.
- Result: Mass arrests of protesters and opposition leaders, deprivation of international observers

Parties
(Djibouti) Protester	Government of Djibouti; National Police Force; Gendarmerie

Lead figures
At least 2 fatalities	10 injuries

The 2011 Djiboutian protests were widespread demonstrations and riots that took place between January and March 2011 in Djibouti, situated in the Horn of Africa. A member of the Arab League, the protests in Djibouti showed a clear influence from the concurrent Arab Spring protests in North Africa and the Arabian Peninsula. The demonstrations ended after mass arrests and the barring of international observers.

== Background ==
President of Djibouti Ismail Omar Guelleh has been in office since 1999, but his government has been in power for 34 years. Recently, Guelleh changed the constitution so that he could have a third term in office. This proved unpopular with the Djiboutian population.

These protests occurred in the months leading up to the 2011 Djiboutian presidential election.

== Protests ==
=== Before February 19 ===
On January 25, thousands of people turned out to protest in Djibouti City. Similar to the events on January 28, only smaller. 300 people gathered in a square in the capital, Djibouti. On February 18, thousands rallied against the president, gathering at a stadium with the intention of staying there until their demands were met. However, the demonstration escalated into clashes after dusk, as police used batons and tear gas against stone-throwing protesters. Officials from the Union for Democratic Change, an umbrella group of three opposition parties, gave speeches at the demonstration calling for Guelleh to step down.

=== February 19–25 ===
On February 19, clashes were reported to be intensifying. Anti-government protestors clashed with security forces 24 hours after hundreds of demonstrators demanding the president step down hurled stones at riot police who fired back with tear gas. At least one policeman was killed, and sources said one protester had also been killed. The protest leaders were arrested The next day, Djiboutian authorities released three opposition leaders as opponents of President Ismail Guelleh clashed with police.

Leaders of the United Sun Nations, opposition parties and protest organisers were set to meet on February 24 to plan mass protests for the following day. Police acting on behalf of Gulleh arrested 300 organisers during and after the mass protests on February 18, with reports of torture being used to sedate the activists. After the failure of the leaders to turn up on February 24, opposition leader Bourhan Mohammed Ali stated he feared the protests had lost momentum. Protests had been planned for March 4, but it remained to be seen if the Djiboutians would be able to coordinate themselves without the 300 arrested leaders.

=== February 26 – March 11 ===
On March 3, Djibouti ordered its opposition party to cancel its anti-government protests which were to be held on March 4, 2011 due to a previous rally a month earlier turning violent. Mohammed Daoud, head of the opposition Djibouti Party for Development, said that protests would occur as scheduled. On the 4th soldiers and police filled the streets to prevent the planned demonstration from blocking the route to the city's main stadium where they were to have taken place and preventing the protest. A protest was planned for March 11, but security forces scuppered the protest and detained 4 opposition leaders.

== Censorship ==
On February 9, the President of the Djibouti League of Human Rights was arrested.

On March 21, US election monitors were expelled from the country, whose task would have been to observe the April 2011 presidential election.

== Response ==
The United Kingdom's Ministry of Foreign Affairs warned against travel to Djibouti.

== See also ==
- 2011 Djiboutian presidential election
- Arab Spring
- 2020 Djibouti protests
- 2018 Ethiopian Protests
- Eritrean Uprising
