= 1993 Djiboutian presidential election =

← 1987	7 May 1993	1999 →
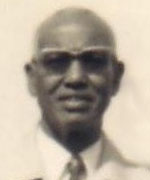

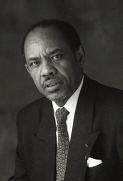

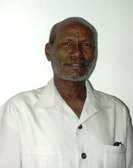
Nominee	Hassan Gouled Aptidon	Mohamed Djama Elabeh	Aden Robleh Awaleh
Party	RPP	PRD	PND
Popular vote	45,162	16,386	9,143
Percentage	60.75%	22.04%	12.30%
President before election
Hassan Gouled Aptidon
RPP
Elected President
Hassan Gouled Aptidon
RPP

Presidential elections were held in Djibouti on 7 May 1993. They followed the constitutional changes approved in a referendum the previous year, which re-introduced multi-party democracy, and were the first presidential elections to feature more than one candidate. Nevertheless, incumbent president Hassan Gouled Aptidon of the People's Rally for Progress won, taking 60.7% of the vote, based on a 51.25 turnout.

== Results ==
Candidate	Party	Votes	%
Hassan Gouled Aptidon	People's Rally for Progress	45,162	60.75
Mohamed Djama Elabeh	Party for Democratic Renewal	16,386	22.04
Aden Robleh Awaleh	National Democratic Party	9,143	12.30
Mohamed Moussa Ali	Independent	2,185	2.94
Ahmed Ibrahim Abdi	Independent	1,466	1.97
Total		74,342	100.00
Valid votes		74,342	97.70
Invalid/blank votes		1,750	2.30
Total votes		76,092	100.00
Registered voters/turnout		148,742	51.16
Source: Nohlen et al.
