= Omar Ahmed Wais =

Djiboutian politician

Second Vice President of the National Assembly
- Incumbent
- Assumed office 5 March 2023

Personal details
- Citizenship: Djibouti
- Party: People's Rally for Progress
- Occupation: politician

Omar Ahmed Wais is a Djiboutian politician, currently serving as second vice president of the National Assembly.
