= Mohamed Ali Houmed =

Djiboutian politician

President of the National Assembly
- In office 1 March 2015 – 5 March 2023
- Preceded by: Idriss Arnaoud Ali
- Succeeded by: Dileita Mohamed Dileita

Personal details
- Born: 1973
- Political party: Front for the Restoration of Unity and Democracy

Mohamed Ali Houmed (born 1973) is a Djiboutian politician who served as President of the National Assembly from 2015 to 2023.

== Early life ==
Mohamed Ali Houmed was born in 1973.

== Career ==
Houmed was elected President of the National Assembly on 1 March 2015. He was president of the executive committee of the African Parliamentary Union.

== Works cited ==
=== News ===
- Hiriats, Nicollette (30 October 2024). "MP Semoso lays late mother to rest". Papua New Guinea Post-Courier. Archived from the original on 28 June 2025.

=== Web ===
- "Djibouti". Inter-Parliamentary Union. Archived from the original on 5 July 2020.
- "High-level parliamentary conference on Understanding the terrorist threat in Africa". United Nations. Archived from the original on 28 June 2025.
