= 1982 Djiboutian parliamentary election =

Parliamentary elections were held in Djibouti on 21 May 1982. They were first elections for the National Assembly since independence in 1977, and were open only to the People's Rally for Progress, which had become the country's sole legal party the previous year. The RPP put forward a list of 65 candidates for the 65 seats, which was approved by 100% of voters with a turnout of 92.4%.

== Results ==
Party	Votes	%	Seats	+/–
People's Rally for Progress	77,984	100.00	65	New
Total	77,984	100.00	65	0
Valid votes	77,984	98.31		
Invalid/blank votes	1,343	1.69		
Total votes	79,327	100.00		
Registered voters/turnout	85,870	92.38		
Source: Nohlen et al.
