= 1981 Djiboutian presidential election =

- 12 June 1981
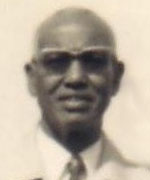
Nominee	Hassan Gouled Aptidon
Party	RPP
Popular vote	97,473
Percentage	100%
President before election
Hassan Gouled Aptidon
RPP
Elected President
Hassan Gouled Aptidon
RPP

Presidential elections were held in Djibouti for the first time on 12 June 1981. Earlier in the year, the country had been declared a one-party state with the People's Rally for Progress as the only legally permitted party. RPP leader Hassan Gouled Aptidon, who had been president since independence in 1977, was the sole candidate on the ballot, and was re-elected with 84.58% of the total votes cast.

== Results ==
Candidate	Party	Votes	%
Hassan Gouled Aptidon	People's Rally for Progress	97,473	100
Valid			84.58
Invalid			15.42
Total			
Source: Marchés tropicaux et méditerranéens, Presidency
