= Ali Mohamed Daoud =

Djiboutian politician

Ali Mohamed Daoud, also known as Jean-Marie (born 28 August 1950, dead 2 April 2026 in Djibouti), is a Djiboutian politician and the President of the Front for the Restoration of Unity and Democracy (FRUD). He is currently a member of the National Assembly of Djibouti.

== Life and career ==
Daoud is a member of the Afar ethnic group. FRUD, fighting on behalf of Afar interests, began a rebellion against the Issa-dominated government in 1991. Daoud led the moderate faction of FRUD in signing a peace agreement with the government in December 1994. As a result of the agreement, he joined the government (together with one other FRUD member, Secretary-General Ougouré Kiflé Ahmed) as Minister of Public Health and Social Affairs on 8 June 1995. Daoud's faction of FRUD also allied with the governing People's Rally for Progress (RPP). On 15–16 April 1997, FRUD held its First Congress; Daoud, who was already FRUD President, remained in that position at the congress. Daoud was elected to the National Assembly in the December 1997 parliamentary election as the first candidate on the joint candidate list of the RPP and FRUD for Tadjourah Region.

Daoud was moved from his post as Minister of Public Health and Social Affairs to that of Minister of Agriculture, Animal Husbandry, and the Sea on 12 May 1999; he was also assigned responsibility for hydraulic resources. After holding that post for two years, he was omitted from the government that was appointed on 4 July 2001. FRUD held its Second Ordinary Congress on 28–29 April 2002, and Daoud was re-elected as FRUD President.

Daoud was re-elected in the January 2003 parliamentary election as the first candidate on the candidate list of the ruling coalition, the Union for a Presidential Majority (UMP), in Tadjourah Region. In this election, the other, more radical wing of FRUD, led by Ahmed Dini Ahmed, participated in the election as part of the opposition; Daoud criticized Ahmed as a "perpetual loser".

President Ismail Omar Guelleh awarded the medal of the Commander of the Great Star of Djibouti to Daoud and Ougouré Kiflé Ahmed during independence day celebrations on 27 June 2004. At FRUD's Third Congress, held on 30–31 May 2007, Daoud was re-elected as President of FRUD by acclamation, without opposition. He was again re-elected to the National Assembly in the February 2008 parliamentary election as the second candidate on the UMP's candidate list for the city of Djibouti.
