= Said Ibrahim Badoul =

Djiboutian politician

President of the National Assembly
- In office 22 November 1993 – 2003
- Preceded by: Abdoulkader Waberi Askar
- Succeeded by: Idriss Arnaoud Ali

Personal details
- Born: 1944; Gagade (Dikhil, Djibouti)
- Died: April 2013 ( Aged 69 ) Djibouti, Djibouti
- Political party: People's Rally for Progress

Said Ibrahim Badoul (born 1944) is a Djiboutian politician who was president of the National Assembly.

Badoul was born in 1944 in Gagade (Dikhil). He was elected deputy in the Chamber of Deputies in 1973. He was an opposition MP from 1975 to 1977. Again elected deputy in the National Assembly from 1979 to 1993. On 22 November 1993 Badoul was elected President of the National Assembly. He served until the 2003 elections.
