= Mohamed Daoud Chehem =

Djiboutian former political prisoner

Mohamed Daoud Chehem is a senior civil servant, noted opposition leader and former presidential candidate for the Azuria Development Party (PDD) in Djibouti. Chehem is a member of the Afar ethnic group, and was part of the Afar rebel Front for the Restoration of Unity and Democracy (FRUD) opposition movement. In 1991, in a wave of mass arrests in the midst of a civil war between FRUD and Hassan Gouled Aptidon's oppressive regime, Chehem was imprisoned and tortured. In 1997 it was widely reported that Chehem along with five other FRUD members, was abducted from Ethiopia and given over to agents of Hassan Gouled Aptidon's regime. Chehem was again subjected to torture and the political prisoners' plight became the subject of campaigns by Amnesty International and other human rights groups. In addition, United Nations Special Rapporteur of the Commission on Human Rights, Nigel S. Rodley sent an urgent request for their release to Aptidon's government.

During the April 2005 elections in Djibouti, only the country's third multiparty presidential election, Chehem became a prominent opposition candidate. But he eventually dropped out of the campaign in March, citing lack of funds and harassment by the government. Ismail Omar Guelleh, the current president has served since 1999 and his regime has been decried for its authoritarian nature and human rights violations. Chehem was the last of the opposition candidates to drop out, leaving Guellah to run unopposed and win 100% of the vote. Chehem and other opposition leaders have since accused Guellah of attempting to return Djibouti to one-party rule.
