= Movement for Democratic Renewal and Development =

Political party in Djibouti

Movement for Democratic Renewal and Development Mouvement pour le Renouveau Démocratique et le Développement
- President: Daher Ahmed Farah
- Founder: Mohamed Djame Elabe
- Founded: September 27, 1992
- Headquarters: Djibouti City
- Ideology: Social democracy; Progressivism; Economic interventionism
- Political position: Centre-left
- National affiliation: Union for National Salvation

Website
- mrd-djibouti.com

The Movement for Democratic Renewal and Development (French: Mouvement pour le Renouveau Démocratique et le Développement), (Arabic: لحركة التجديد الديموقراطي والتنمية) is a political party in Djibouti. It was originally known as the Party for Democratic Renewal. The PRD of Djibouti was created with the purpose of forming a national democratic party. The PRD gained popularity at the collapse of the communist bloc and the end of the Cold War. It used its military power gained through its coalition with the Front for the Restoration of Unity and Democracy (FRUD) and the Movement for Peace and Reconciliation (MPR). The current leader of PRD is Abdillani Hamariteha.

The PRD was founded by Mohamed Djame Elabe, a former minister in the government, on 27 September 1992; it replaced the Movement for Peace and Reconciliation, a group founded by Djame in early 1992. The party participated in the December 1992 parliamentary election and won 24.41% of vote, although it obtained no representation in the National Assembly; no other opposition party participated in the election, and all seats were won by the ruling People's Rally for Progress (RPP).

Standing as the PRD presidential candidate in the May 1993 presidential election, Djame placed second behind President Hassan Gouled Aptidon and received about 22% of the vote. Djame died on 26 November 1996, and the PRD held a congress on 23 May 1997, electing Hamariteha as PRD President, Maki Houmed Gaba as First Vice-President, and Carton Dibeth Oblik as Second Vice-President.

In the December 1997 parliamentary election, the PRD received 19.2% of the vote but again failed to win any seats. Together with the leaders of the Group for Democracy and the Republic and the Djibouti United Opposition Front, Hamariteha signed a communiqué providing for an alliance between the three groups on 25 November 1998. In the parliamentary election held on 10 January 2003, the PRD was part of the Union for a Democratic Change (Union pour l'Alternance Démocratique), which won 37.3% of the popular vote but no seats in the National Assembly.
