= 1999 Djiboutian presidential election =

← 1993	9 April 1999	2005 →
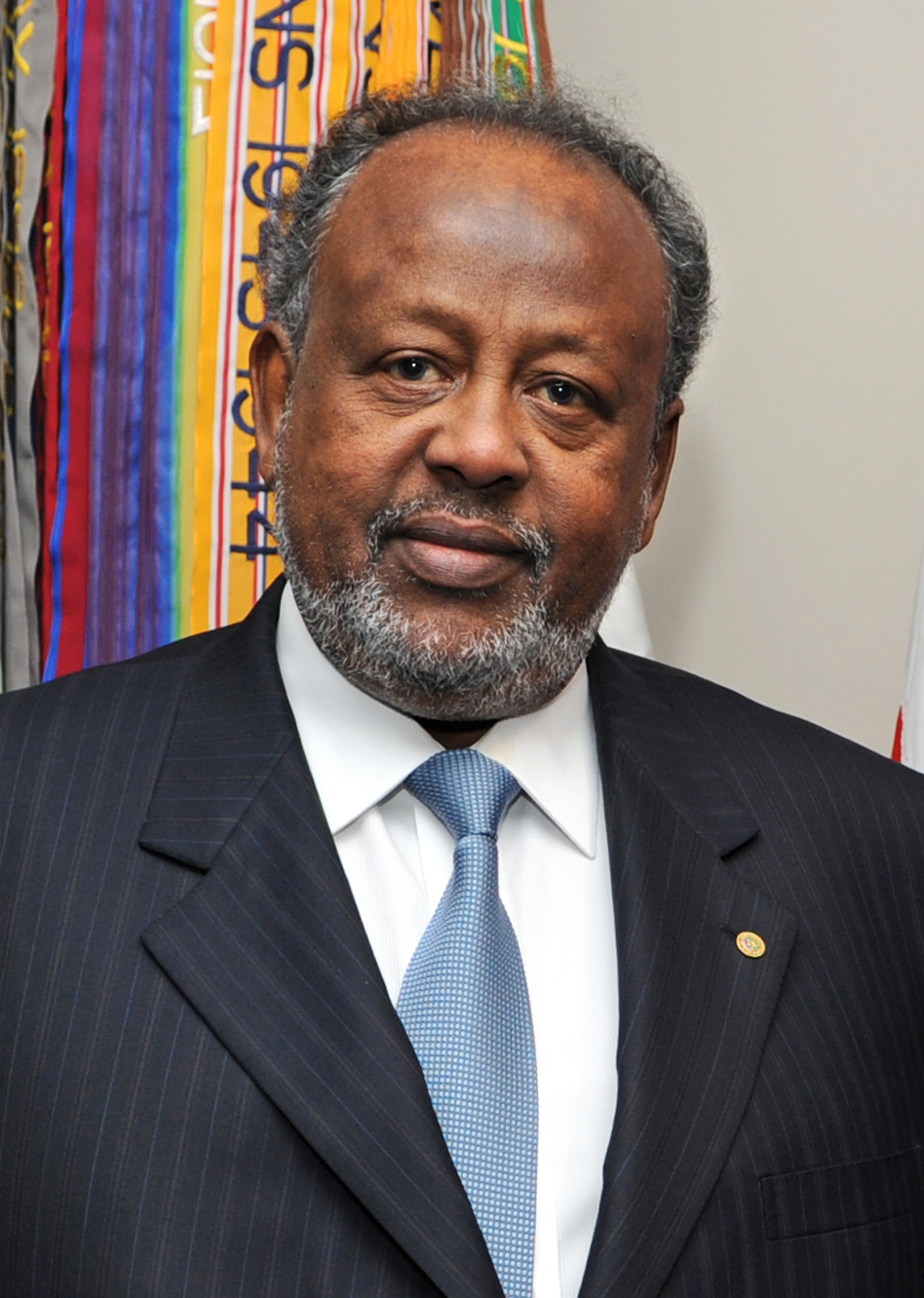
Nominee	Ismaïl Omar Guelleh	Ahmed-Idriss Moussa
Party	RPP	Independent
Alliance	UMP	PND-PRD
Popular vote	76,853	26,972
Percentage	74.02%	25.98%
- Results by region
President before election
Hassan Gouled Aptidon
RPP
Elected President
Ismaïl Omar Guelleh
RPP

Presidential elections were held in Djibouti on 9 April 1999. Following the retirement of Hassan Gouled Aptidon, who had served as President since independence in 1977, his nephew Ismail Omar Guelleh won the nomination of the ruling People's Rally for Progress. His only opponent was Ahmed-Idriss Moussa who ran as an independent, with the support of the National Democratic Party-Democratic Renewal Party coalition. The result was victory for Guelleh, who won 74% of the vote.

== Results ==
Candidate	Party	Votes	%
Ismaïl Omar Guelleh	People's Rally for Progress	76,853	74.02
Ahmed-Idriss Moussa	Independent	26,972	25.98
Total		103,825	100.00
Valid votes		103,825	98.86
Invalid/blank votes		1,200	1.14
Total votes		105,025	100.00
Source: African Elections Database
