= Ahmed Dini Ahmed =

Djiboutian politician who served as the second prime minister of Djibouti

- أحمد ديني أحمد
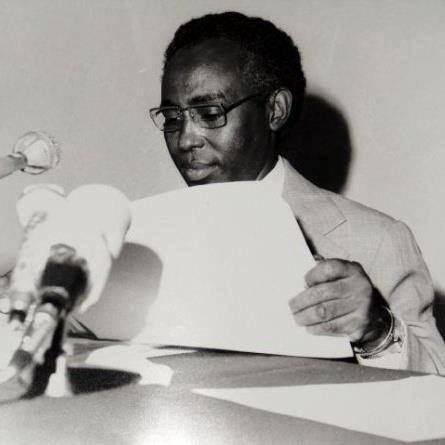
- Ahmed in 1977

2nd Prime Minister of Djibouti
- In office 12 July 1977 – 5 February 1978
- Preceded by: Hassan Gouled Aptidon
- Succeeded by: Abdallah Mohamed Kamil

3rd Vice President of the Government Council of French Somaliland
- In office 12 April 1959 – 8 June 1960
- Preceded by: Hassan Gouled Aptidon
- Succeeded by: Ali Aref Bourhan

Personal details
- Born: c. 1932 Mount Mabla, French Somaliland (present-day Djibouti)
- Died: 12 September 2004 Djibouti City, Djibouti
- Party: MPL, UDA

Ahmed Dini Ahmed (Afar: Acmad Diini Acmad, Arabic: أحمد ديني أحمد; 1932 – 12 September 2004) was a Djiboutian politician who served as the second Prime Minister of Djibouti. He was trained as a health technician and entered the political realm at age 26.

He served as Vice-president of the Representative Council of French Somaliland from April 1959 to June 1960, he was a member of the government of Ali Aref Bourhan in 1962–1964, he then participated in the foundation of the Afar Democratic Union (UDA). He was Minister of Home Affairs until 1971. In 1975, he became spokesman for the new African People's League for Independence (LPAI), led by Hassan Gouled Aptidon. He was elected President of National Assembly from 13 May 1977 to 13 July 1977. He was succeeded by Saad Warsama Dirie.

In July 1977, he became the Prime Minister of the newly independent Djibouti. In December, after the bombing of the Palm in Zinc, and the consequent ban on the Movement for the Liberation (MPL), he resigned and returned to the opposition. He led the Front for the Restoration of Unity and Democracy (FRUD), an Afar rebel group, during the civil war of the 1990s; after the group split in 1994, he led a radical faction of FRUD.

== Biography ==
Ahmed, a member of the Afar ethnic group, was born near Mount Mabla in the northern Djibouti. Following independence, Ahmed became Prime Minister as well Minister in charge of Urban and Regional Planning (Aménagement du territoire) and the Creation of New Resources in July 1977. He resigned from the position six months later after clashing with President Hassan Gouled Aptidon.

== Later years ==
He led FRUD in its armed struggle against the government, which began in 1991. He led the movement that engaged in a desert war against Issa domination which surfaced soon after independence was established. FRUD split in 1994, and a moderate faction led by Ali Mohamed Daoud entered negotiations with the government (signing a peace agreement in December 1994), while Ahmed continued to lead a radical faction which vowed to continue to fight. The radical faction held a congress in late September 1994 and elected Dini as head of its executive committee. Following the signing of a reconciliation agreement between his faction and the government in February 2000, Dini returned to Djibouti from Yemen on 29 March 2000, ending nine years of exile.

In the January 2003 parliamentary election, he was the first candidate on the candidate list of the opposition coalition, the Union for a Democratic Alternative (UAD), in the District of Djibouti; however, the coalition did not win any seats.

He died on 12 September 2004 at a French military hospital in Djibouti.

| Preceded by Hassan Gouled Aptidon | Prime Minister of Djibouti; 1977–1978 | Succeeded by Abdallah Mohamed Kamil |
