= 2005 Djiboutian presidential election =

← 1999	8 April 2005	2011 →
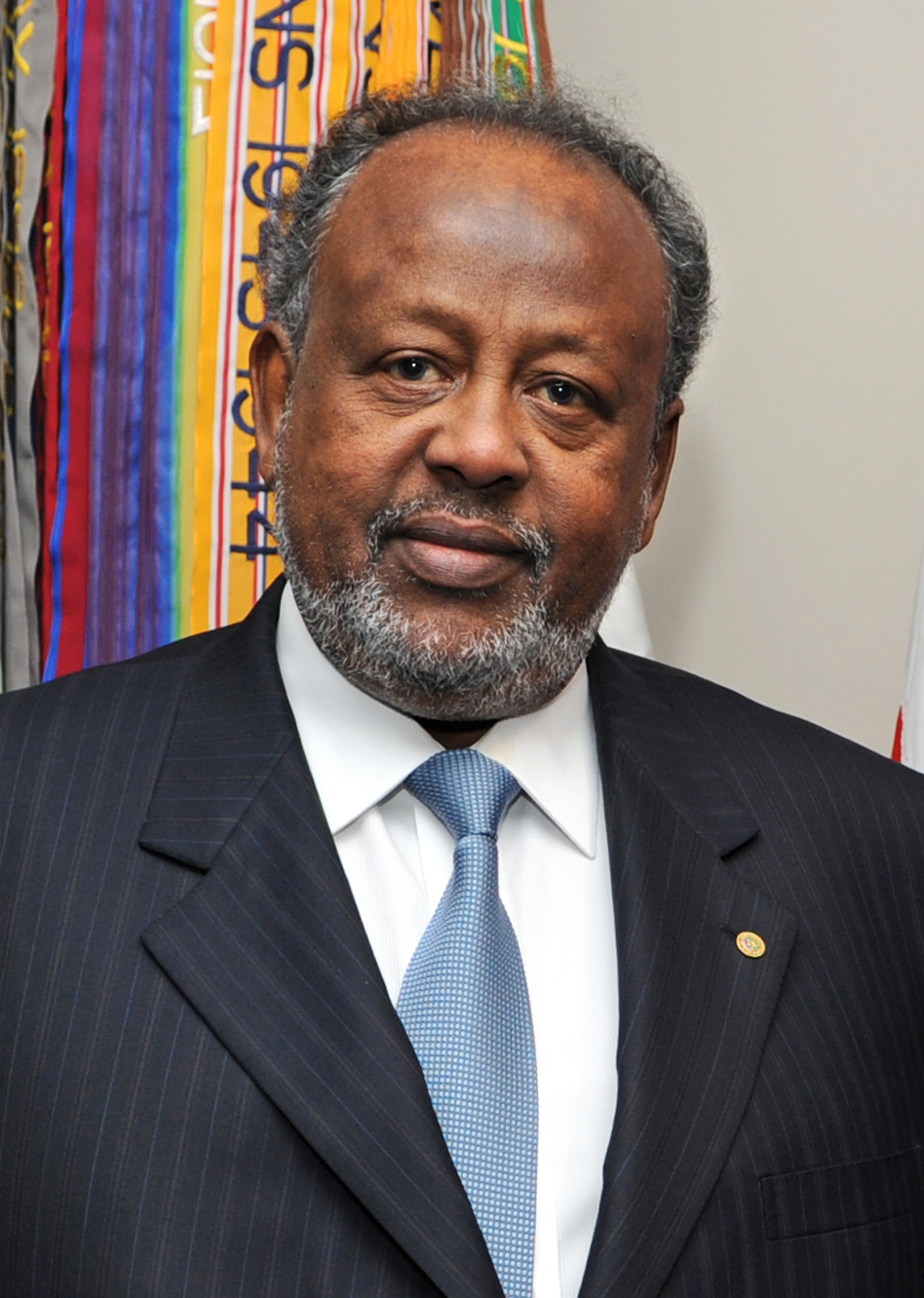
Nominee	Ismaïl Omar Guelleh
Party	RPP
Alliance	UMP
Popular vote	144,433
Percentage	100%
President before election
Ismaïl Omar Guelleh
UMP
Elected President
Ismaïl Omar Guelleh
UMP

Presidential elections were held in Djibouti on 8 April 2005. The incumbent President of Djibouti, Ismail Omar Guelleh, was re-elected to a second six-year term in an unopposed election.

== Background ==
Hassan Gouled Aptidon was president of Djibouti from independence in 1977 until he stepped down in 1999. He had reintroduced multi-party democracy in 1992 under international pressure, but the 1999 presidential election saw Aptidon's nephew, Ismail Omar Guelleh, elected with 74% of the vote. The last parliamentary elections in 2003 saw Guelleh's political party, the Union for a Presidential Majority win all 65 seats in an election the opposition claimed saw significant rigging.

== Campaign ==
The main opposition parties in Djibouti did not put up a candidate in the presidential election and called on their supporters to boycott the election. The only opposition candidate who had said they would stand in the election was Mohamed Daoud Chehem. However, on the 10 March 2005 he withdrew from the election as he said that he did not have enough money to take part in the election. A statement from one opposition party on the 18 March said that "change through the ballot box is almost impossible in the Republic of Djibouti".

Despite having no opponents President Guelleh campaigned strongly in the run up to the election. He held rallies in the evenings and pledged to reduce poverty, increase women's rights and improve the transparency of the government. He also accused the opposition of being afraid to stand against him and said that he regretted having no opponent in the election.

On the day of the election itself there was a protest against the election which was broken up by the police firing tear gas. The official news agency of Djibouti reported that there was a high turnout of over 70% of voters in the election, however members of the opposition said that this was incorrect.

== Results ==
Candidate	Party	Votes	%
Ismaïl Omar Guelleh	People's Rally for Progress	144,433	100.00
Total		144,433	100.00
Valid votes		144,433	96.85
Invalid/blank votes		4,692	3.15
Total votes		149,125	100.00
Registered voters/turnout		208,098	71.66
Source: African Elections Database

== Aftermath ==
Guelleh was sworn in as President for a second term on 9 May 2005 and pledged to increase economic development in Djibouti.
