= Constitution of Djibouti =

Fundamental law of Djibouti since 1992

The Constitution of Djibouti was adopted on 4 September 1992 and amended in 2010. The constitution is divided into 13 titles which together contain 97 articles.

Title 1 defines the state and its sovereignty. Article 1 of the constitution ordains Islam as the state religion, assures equality before the law, proclaims democracy and sovereignty, and establishes the official languages of French and Arabic. Article 2 establishes the capital of Djibouti (city) and recognizes the Flag of Djibouti. Article 7 divides the government into three branches: an executive branch, a legislative branch, and a judiciary.

Title 2 spells out the rights of the people, defining humans as sacred. Article 10 bans the death penalty; guarantees the rights to life, liberty, and personal security and integrity; requires statutory justification for prosecution; establishes the principal of innocent until proven guilty; guarantees the right to an attorney; and forbids detention without a judicial order. Article 11 protects the freedom of thought, the freedom of conscience, and the freedom of religion. Article 12 protects property. Article 13 protects privacy in communications. Article 14 guarantees freedom of movement. Article 16 protects the freedom of speech and freedom of the press, as well as the right to form labor unions and to go on a strike action. Article 16 prohibits torture and establishes punishment for torture. Article 17 requires Djiboutian citizens to defend the nation. Article 18 offers equal protection to "regular foreigners." Article 19 requires the government to protect Djiboutian citizens' legitimate rights and interests abroad.

Title 3 spells out the rights and obligations of the executive branch. A president serves as head of state. The president is elected to a five-year term, must be solely of Djiboutian nationality, and be between the age of forty and seventy-five years old on the deposit of candidature. Re-election is permissible. Elections take place between 30 and 40 days before the end of the current president's term. The president must receive an absolute majority of votes cast; if this is not obtained in the first vote, a runoff election is held between the top two candidates.

During a temporary vacancy in the presidency, the prime minister fills the office. When the vacancy is permanent, the president of the paramount Court fills the office, with a new election taking place between 30 and 45 days after the determination of the vacancy (the President of the Supreme Court is ineligible to run in this new election). The President of the Republic is the commander in chief, issues pardons, can submit any bill to referendum, refers matters which he believes are unconstitutional to the Constitutional Court, is the head of state, and can issue emergency directives.

Title 4 establishes the Legislative Branch. The legislature is a unicameral Parliament named the National Assembly. The legislature is led by the prime minister who is the head of government. Its members are called Deputies. Deputies hold five-year terms and must be at least 23-years old. Any Djiboutian citizen of age (except certain government figures) may run for election to the National Assembly. Deputies enjoy legal immunity; the state must take extraordinary measures to prosecute a Deputy.

Title 5 establishes the relationship between the legislative and executive branches.

Title 6 governs international treaties and agreements, which are negotiated and signed by the President and ratified by the National Assembly.

Title 7 establishes the judiciary. Judges have life tenure. The Court of Accounts has jurisdiction over public finances. There is also a Supreme Court, and there are other courts and tribunals. The Superior Council of the Magistrature governs judges and advises the President on judicial actions; the president presides over the Superior Council of the Magistrature.

Title 8 establishes the Constitutional Council, which wields judicial review. There are six judges on the council, each holding non-renewable terms of 8 years. Two judges are each picked by the President, the President of the National Assembly, and the Superior Council of the Magistrature. The council also oversees election disputes. This is a court of last resort.

Title 9 establishes the High Court of Justice.

Title 10 establishes federal units of Djibouti, known as territorial collectivities.

Title 11 creates the position of the Mediator of the Republic.

Title 12 provides amendment procedure.

Title 13 promulgates the constitution.
