= Union for the Presidential Majority =

Union for the Presidential Majority Union pour la Majorité Présidentielle
- Leader: Ismaïl Omar Guelleh
- President: Abdoulkader Kamil Mohamed
- Founded: 2003
- Headquarters: Djibouti City
- Ideology: Social welfarism Socialism; Social democracy
- Political position: Centre-left to left-wing
- National Assembly: 58 / 65

Party flag
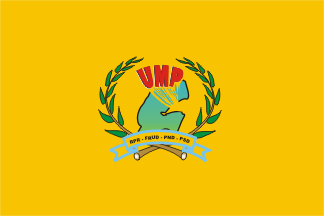

Website
- ump.dj

The Union for the Presidential Majority (French: Union pour la Majorité Présidentielle, UMP) is the ruling political coalition in Djibouti. The coalition supports the Presidency of Ismaïl Omar Guelleh.

The coalition originally formed to contest the 2003 parliamentary election, and support Guelleh in the 2005 presidential election.

The coalition is composed of four parties; the RPP, the FRUD, the PSD, and the UPR.

== Members ==
Name	Ideology	Leader	Joined
People's Rally for Progress; Rassemblement populaire pour le Progrès	Socialism	Ismaïl Omar Guelleh	2003
Front for the Restoration of Unity and Democracy; Front pour la Restauration de l'Unité et de la Démocratie	Afar interests	Ali Mohamed Daoud	2003
Social Democratic People's Party; Parti Populaire Social Démocrate	Social democracy	Moumin Bahdon Farah	2003
Union of Reform Partisans; Union des Partisans de la Réforme		Ibrahim Chehem Daoud	2008

=== Former Members ===
Name	Ideology	Time
National Democratic Party; Parti National Démocratique	Social democracy	2003-2011

== Electoral history ==
=== Presidential elections ===
Election	Party candidate	Votes	%	Result
2005	Ismaïl Omar Guelleh	144,433	100%	Elected ✓
2011	Ismaïl Omar Guelleh	89,942	80.63%	Elected ✓
2016	Ismaïl Omar Guelleh	111,389	87.07%	Elected ✓
2021	Ismaïl Omar Guelleh	155,291	97.30%	Elected ✓
2026	Ismaïl Omar Guelleh	204,874	97.01%	Elected ✓

=== National Assembly elections ===
Election	Party leader	Votes	%	Seats	+/–	Position	Result
2003	Ismaïl Omar Guelleh	53,293	62.7%	65 / 65	Steady	1st	Supermajority government
2008	Ismaïl Omar Guelleh	103,463	94.06%	65 / 65	Steady	1st	Supermajority government
2013	Ismaïl Omar Guelleh	74,016	61.5%	55 / 65	▼10	1st	Supermajority government
2018	Ismaïl Omar Guelleh	105,278	87.83%	57 / 65	▲2	1st	Supermajority government
2023	Ismaïl Omar Guelleh	159,658	93.68%	58 / 65	▲1	1st	Supermajority government
