= 2013 Djiboutian parliamentary election =

- 22 February 2013

All 65 seats in the National Assembly 33 seats needed for a majority
- Registered: 184,160
- Turnout: 66.60% (▼6.01pp)
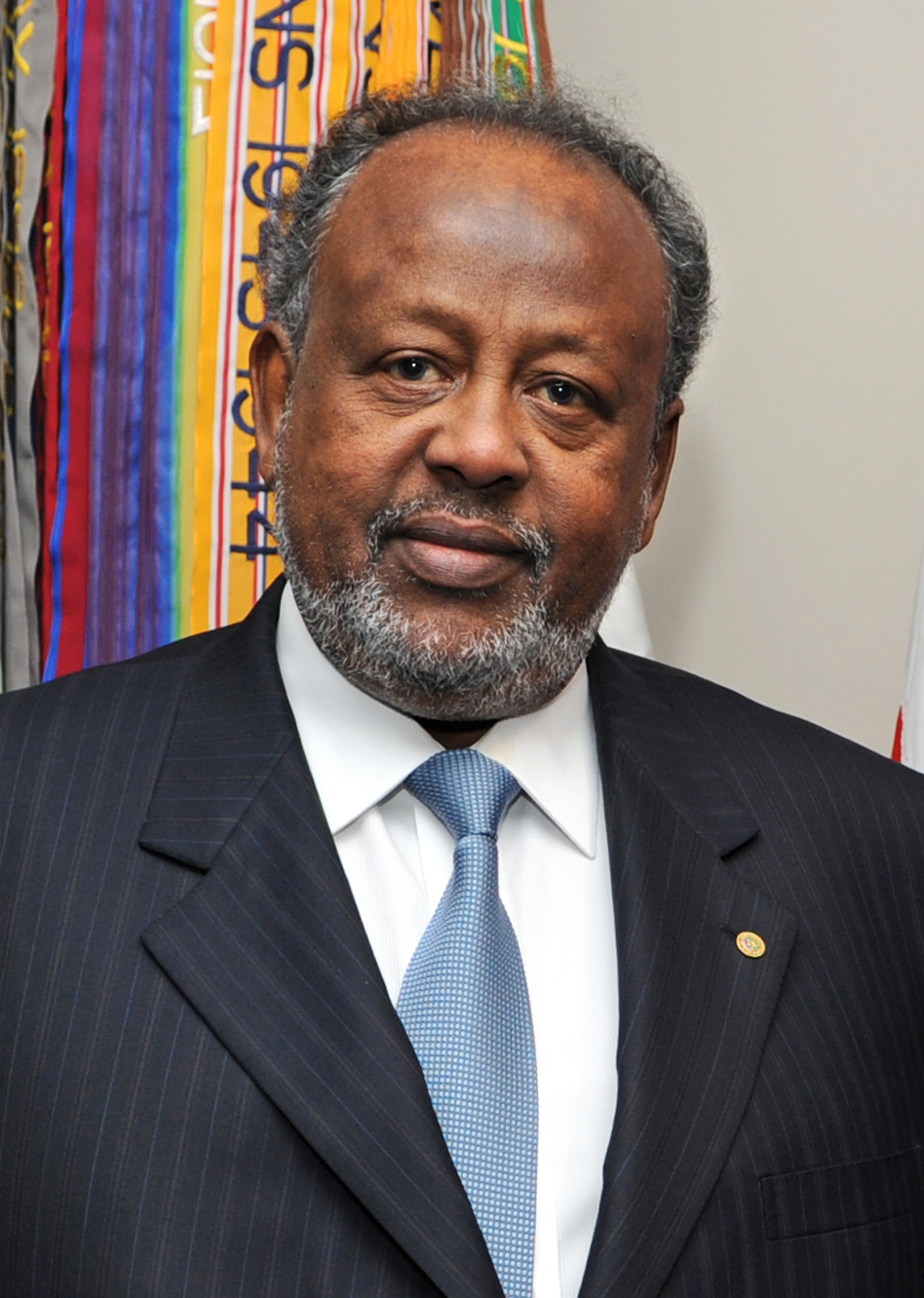
	First party	Second party
		USN
Leader	Ismaïl Omar Guelleh	Omar Elmi Khaireh
Party	UMP	USN
Seats won	55	10
Seat change	▼10	New
Popular vote	74,016	42,897
Percentage	61.53%	35.66%
Swing	▼38.47pp	New
- Results by region
President of the National Assembly before election
Idriss Arnaoud Ali
RPP
Elected President of the National Assembly
Idriss Arnaoud Ali
RPP

Parliamentary elections were held in Djibouti on 22 February 2013. After their boycott of the 2008 elections, opposition groups contested the elections as the Union for National Safety alliance.

According to government figures, the ruling Union for the Presidential Majority won 55 of 65 seats in Parliament, while the USN won the remaining 10 seats. It was the first time since independence in 1977 that opposition parties had been represented in the legislature. However, the USN claimed the figures for Djibouti city were falsified and released alternative results which would have reduced the UMP to 34 seats and increased their total from 10 to 31.

== Electoral system ==
In 2013 the previous winner-takes-all party block vote was abandoned. Instead the elections were held using closed list systems in which 80% of seats (rounded to the nearest integer) in each constituency were awarded to the party receiving the most votes. The remaining seats were allocated proportionally to other parties receiving over 10% of the vote using the D'Hondt method. In cases where no other party received more than 10% of the vote, all seats in a constituency were awarded to the party receiving the most votes.

== Results ==
Party	Votes	%	Seats	+/–
Union for the Presidential Majority	74,016	61.53	55	–10
Union for National Salvation	42,897	35.66	10	New
Centre of Unified Democrats	3,389	2.82	0	New
Total	120,302	100.00	65	0
Valid votes	120,302	98.09		
Invalid/blank votes	2,345	1.91		
Total votes	122,647	100.00		
Registered voters/turnout	184,160	66.60		
Source: Journal Officiel

=== By region ===
Region	UMP		USN		CUD	
Region	%	Seats	%	Seats	%	Seats
Djibouti	49.4	28	47.6	7	3.0	0
Arta	69.4	2	30.6	1	–	–
Ali Sabeh	51.0	5	44.4	1	4.6	0
Dikhil	88.3	11	9.5	0	2.3	0
Tadjourah	83.4	5	12.1	1	4.5	0
Obock	96.6	4	3.4	0	–	–
Total	61.5	55	35.7	10	2.8	0

== Aftermath ==
On 26 February 2013, UNS spokesman Daher Ahmed Farah said police fired tear gas on demonstrators that were protesting the election results. 300 people were arrested. "The situation is tense," Farah said. "The opposition won the elections and the victory was denied... the numbers were manipulated." The National Assembly began meeting for its new parliamentary term on 18 March 2013. Idriss Arnaoud Ali was re-elected without opposition as President of the National Assembly. 10 opposition deputies were not present.
