= 1997 Djiboutian parliamentary election =

- 19 December 1997

All 65 seats in the National Assembly 33 seats needed for a majority
- Registered: 166,276
- Turnout: 56.71% (▲8.21pp)
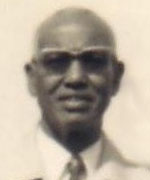
	First party
Leader	Hassan Gouled Aptidon
Party	RPP
Seats won	65
Seat change	Steady
Popular vote	72,073
Percentage	78.56%
Swing	▲3.97pp
- Results by region
President of the National Assembly before election
Said Ibrahim Badoul
RPP
Elected President of the National Assembly
Said Ibrahim Badoul
RPP

Parliamentary elections were held in Djibouti on 19 December 1997. The Front for the Restoration of Unity and Democracy, which had boycotted the last election, ran joint candidates with the ruling People's Rally for Progress. Together, they won all 65 seats in the National Assembly, with the PRP taking 54 and the FRUD 11. Voter turnout was 57%.

== Results ==
Party	Votes	%	Seats	+/–
RPP–FRUD	72,073	78.56	65	0
Party of Democratic Renewal	17,607	19.19	0	0
National Democratic Party	2,067	2.25	0	New
Total	91,747	100.00	65	0
Valid votes	91,747	97.29		
Invalid/blank votes	2,556	2.71		
Total votes	94,303	100.00		
Registered voters/turnout	166,276	56.71		
Source: African Elections Database
