= 1992 Djiboutian constitutional referendum =

4 September 1992

Do you approve the new constitution?
For	98.05%
Against	1.95%

Do you approve of limiting party politics to a maximum of four parties?
For	97.89%
Against	2.11%

A constitutional referendum was held in Djibouti on 4 September 1992. The new constitution would restore multi-party democracy for the first time since independence. A second question asked voters whether the number of political parties should be limited to four. Both were approved by over 97.9% of voters with a 75.2% turnout. The first multi-party elections were held in December that year.

== Results ==
=== New constitution ===
Choice	Votes	%
For	101,287	98.1
Against	2,013	1.9
Invalid/blank votes	1,504	-
Total	104,804	100
Source: Nohlen et al.

=== Limit of four political parties ===
Choice	Votes	%
For	101,125	97.9
Against	2,177	2.1
Invalid/blank votes	1,504	-
Total	104,804	100
Source: Nohlen et al.
