= Front for the Restoration of Unity and Democracy =

Political party in Djibouti

Front for the Restoration of Unity and Democracy Front pour la Restauration de l'Unité et de la Démocratie
- President: Ali Mohamed Daoud
- Founded: 1991
- Headquarters: Djibouti City
- Ideology: Afar interests; Regionalism
- Political position: Big tent
- National affiliation: Union for the Presidential Majority
- National Assembly: 12 / 65

Party flag

The Front for the Restoration of Unity and Democracy (French: Front pour la Restauration de l'Unité et de la Démocratie, FRUD; Arabic: الجبهة من أجل استعادة الوحدة والديمقراطية) is a political party in Djibouti. It is aligned with the interests of the Afar people who live in the country, although it has supporters residing outside of Djibouti.

== History ==
=== Uprising against the government and party split ===
Three Afar groups—Action for the Revision of Order in Djibouti, the Front for the Restoration of Right and Equality, and the Djibouti Patriotic Resistance Front—merged in 1991 to form FRUD. In late 1991, FRUD launched a rebellion against the Issa-dominated government.

Nearly 1,000 people died during the conflict until 1994. In that year, the party split into two factions: a moderate wing, led by Ali Mohamed Daoud, signed a peace agreement with the government on 26 December 1994 in Aba'a, while other wing, led by Ahmed Dini Ahmed, denounced this agreement and continued armed resistance. The radicals held a congress in northern Djibouti for six days in late September 1994, and announced on 30 September 1994 that the congress delegates "unanimously reaffirmed their determination to pursue armed struggle until their political goals are satisfied," while electing Dini at the head of the faction's executive committee.

=== Insurgency by FRUD-C ===
After the party's split, the FRUD-C (Front pour la restauration de l’unité et de la démocratie – Combattant, or Front for the Restoration of Unity and Democracy – Combatant; alternatively called "FRUD Ahmed Dini faction", "FRUD-Radicals", "FRUD-Armé" or "Armed FRUD") was organized by those FRUD members determined to keep fighting. They continued an insurgency against the government of Djibouti with the support of Eritrea with arms and probably logistics in an effort to cut the supply routes from Djibouti to landlocked Ethiopia during the Eritrean–Ethiopian War. Up to 2014, the insurgency caused 100 deaths.

Since then, there have only been few attacks. In January 2021, FRUD-C killed a policeman. On 7 October 2022, FRUD-C attacked a military barracks in Garabtisan, killing seven soldiers, wounding four. Six were reported as missing. This assault was strongly denounced not only by Djibouti's government, but also FRUD's moderate faction as "unjustifiable in the current context of political pluralism."

=== Activity of the moderate faction ===
While the radical FRUD elements continued to fight, the Daoud faction began to participate in national politics.

As a result of its December 1994 agreement with the government, the moderate faction was given two ministerial positions on 8 June 1995: FRUD President Daoud became Minister of Health and Social Affairs, while FRUD Secretary-General Ougoure Kifle Ahmed became Minister of Agriculture and Water Resources. The moderate faction was formally legalized in March 1996. On 15–16 April 1997, it held its First Ordinary Congress, electing a 153-member National Council and a 21-member Executive Committee. Although the party continued to be led by Daoud, who is an Afar, the composition of the leadership selected at this congress reflected the party's efforts to appeal to other ethnic groups aside from its Afar base. Djama Djellai, an Issa, was chosen as First Vice-President, and Ismael Youssouf, a Gadabursi, was chosen as Second Vice-President. The Executive Committee included several representatives of ethnic groups aside from the Afar: four were Issa, two were Gadabursi, two were Arabs, and one was Isaaq. FRUD took part in the December 1997 parliamentary election in alliance with the ruling People's Rally for Progress (RPP), and this alliance won 78.5% of the vote, taking all 65 seats in the National Assembly.

==== 1999 presidential election ====
Ismail Omar Guelleh of the RPP stood in the presidential election held on April 9, 1999, as the joint candidate of the RPP and FRUD, receiving 74.02% of the vote. Prior to the election, Abatte Ebo Adou, a FRUD parliamentary deputy, announced that he would stand as a presidential candidate and was expelled from FRUD as a result.

For its part, the radical faction eventually signed its own peace agreement with the government in 2001.

FRUD held its Second Ordinary Congress on 28–29 April 2002. Daoud was re-elected as FRUD President at this congress, and the party's Executive Committee was reduced from 27 to 19 members.

==== 2003 parliamentary election ====
In the parliamentary election held on 10 January 2003, the moderate faction was part of the Union for the Presidential Majority (Union pour la Majorité Présidentielle, UMP), which won 62.7% of the popular vote and all seats. The radical faction participated in the election as part of the opposition coalition, the Union for a Democratic Change.

==== Third Ordinary Congress ====
The moderate faction held its Third Ordinary Congress, attended by 1,250 delegates, on 30–31 May 2007. Daoud was re-elected as President of FRUD by acclamation, without opposition. At the congress, FRUD's National Council was expanded to 335 members; the FRUD Executive Committee named at this congress included 26 members, four of whom were women. FRUD was again part of the UMP for the February 2008 parliamentary election; the UMP again won all seats amidst an opposition boycott.

== Electoral history ==
=== National Assembly elections ===
Election	Party leader	Votes	%	Seats	+/–	Position	Result
1997	Ali Mohamed Daoud	72,073 joint candidate with RPP	78.56%	54 / 65	▲54	▲1st	RPP-FRUD coalition government
2003	Ali Mohamed Daoud	53,293 as part of the UMP	62.7%	65 / 65	▲11	1st	UMP coalition government
2008	Ali Mohamed Daoud	103,463 as part of the UMP	94.06%	65 / 65	Steady	1st	UMP coalition government
2013	Ali Mohamed Daoud	74,016 as part of the UMP	61.5%	55 / 65	▼10	1st	UMP coalition government
2018	Ali Mohamed Daoud	105,278 as part of the UMP	87.83%	57 / 65	▲2	1st	UMP coalition government
2023	Ali Mohamed Daoud	159,658 as part of the UMP	93.68%	58 / 65	▲1	1st	UMP coalition government
