= National Assembly (Djibouti) =

Legislative body of Djibouti

Coordinates: 11.5959°N 43.1486°E

National Assembly: الجمعية الوطنية (Arabic); Assemblée nationale (French); Golaha Qaranka (Somali); Agat Malah Buxa (Afar)
- 9th National Assembly

Type
- Type: Unicameral

History
- Founded: 1946 (Colonial); 1977 (Constituent Assembly); 1992 (Current constitution)
- New session started: 5 March 2023

Leadership
- President: Dileita Mohamed Dileita, RPP–UMP since 5 March 2023
- First Vice President: Safia Elmi Djibril, RPP–UMP since 5 March 2023
- Second Vice President: Omar Ahmed Wais, RPP–UMP since 5 March 2023

Structure
- Seats: 65
- Political groups: Majority (58): UPM (58); RPP (45); FRUD (12); PND (1); Minority (7): UDJ (7)
- Length of term: 5 years

Elections
- Voting system: Party-list proportional representation
- First election: 21 May 1982
- Last election: 24 February 2023
- Next election: 2028

Meeting place
- Assemblee Nationale; Djibouti City, Djibouti Region; Republic of Djibouti

Website
- www.assemblee-nationale.dj

Constitution
- Constitution of Djibouti

The National Assembly, formerly known as the Chamber of Deputies, is the unicameral parliament of the Republic of Djibouti. Established under Title V of the 1992 Constitution, it consists of 65 members who are elected by direct and secret universal suffrage and cannot simultaneously serve in the government of Djibouti. Elections are scheduled to be held once every five years, normally on the last Friday of February. The most recent elections were held on 24 February 2023.

== History ==
Djibouti’s legislative body traces its origins to the colonial era. From 1946 to 1957, the territory—then under foreign rule as French Somaliland—was governed by a Representative Council. The 1956 framework law introduced a Territorial Assembly, which functioned as the main legislative body until 1967, when it was replaced by the Chamber of Deputies of the French Territory of the Afars and the Issas. Following Djibouti’s independence following the 1977 referendum, the Chamber of Deputies remained in place, eventually evolving into the modern National Assembly.

== Overview ==
The National Assembly consists of 65 members known as deputies – 30 Somali (30 Issa) and 25 Afar. Members are elected to serve five-year terms in multi-member constituencies, which range from 4 to 37 seats each. Any Djiboutian citizen aged 23 or older, with full civil and political rights, is eligible to run for office. The country’s first multi-party parliamentary elections since independence in 1977 were held in 2003. The ruling coalition, led by the People's Rally for Progress (RPP), secured 62.7% of the vote but was awarded all legislative seats.

Since its inception, the National Assembly has been overwhelmingly dominated by the RPP, which currently heads the Union for a Presidential Majority (UMP) coalition. From 1981 to 1992, the RPP was the only legal political party. Opposition parties were legalized following the 1992 constitutional referendum, but the RPP continued to control the legislature. Beginning in 1997, the party ran elections as part of a coalition—rebranded in 2003 as the UMP—which maintained its firm grip on parliament. It was not until the 2013 elections that opposition parties finally secured representation. However, in the 2018 elections, which were boycotted by major opposition groups, the UMP retained a dominant two-thirds majority.

Djibouti’s political system remains highly centralized, with executive authority concentrated in the presidency, a position held by Ismaïl Omar Guelleh since 1999, which has left little room for legislative opposition. As of 2018, a quota mandates that at least 25% of parliamentary seats be held by women.

== Presidents ==
Name	Took office	Left office	Notes
Ahmed Dini Ahmed	13 May 1977	13 July 1977	
Saad Warsama Dirie	13 July 1977	May 1979	
Abdoulkader Waberi Askar	May 1979	10 February 1993	
Said Ibrahim Badoul	22 November 1993	21 January 2003	
Idriss Arnaoud Ali	21 January 2003	12 February 2015	
Mohamed Ali Houmed	10 April 2015	2023	
Dileita Mohamed Dileita	5 March 2023	Incumbent	

== Vice-Presidents ==
Name	Took office	Left office	Notes
Safia Elmi Djibril	5 March 2023	Incumbent	
Omar Ahmed Wais	5 March 2023	Incumbent	

== Building ==
The National Assembly building of Djibouti, constructed with partial funding from the Iranian government, was completed on 23 November 2014. However, the debt incurred for the project remains unpaid to this day. The inauguration ceremony was attended by the Speaker of the Islamic Consultative Assembly, Ali Larijani, who formally handed over the building.

== Latest election ==
Party	Votes	%	Seats	+/–
Union for the Presidential Majority	159,658	93.68	58	+1
Djibouti Union for Democracy and Justice	10,772	6.32	7	+2
Total	170,430	100.00	65	0
Registered voters/turnout	230,295	–		
Source: Official Journal
