= Hassan Gouled Aptidon =

President of Djibouti from 1977 to 1999

His Excellency Hassan Gouled Aptidon
- حسن جوليد ابتيدون
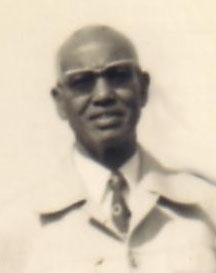
- Aptidon in 1977

1st President of Djibouti
- In office 27 June 1977 – 8 May 1999
- Prime Minister: Himself; Ahmed Dini Ahmed; Abdallah Mohamed Kamil; Barkat Gourad Hamadou
- Preceded by: Office established
- Succeeded by: Ismaïl Omar Guelleh

1st Prime Minister of Djibouti
- In office 27 June 1977 – 12 July 1977
- President: Himself
- Preceded by: Office established
- Succeeded by: Ahmed Dini Ahmed

2nd Vice President of the Government Council of French Somaliland
- In office 8 December 1958 – 12 April 1959
- Preceded by: Mahmoud Harbi
- Succeeded by: Ahmed Dini Ahmed

Personal details
- Born: 15 October 1916 Garissa, Lughaya District, British Somaliland
- Died: 21 November 2006 (aged 90) Djibouti City, Djibouti
- Party: People's Rally for Progress
- Spouse: Aïcha Bogoreh Darrar (died in 2001)
- Relations: Gouled-Guelleh family

Hassan Gouled Aptidon (Somali: Xasan Guuleed Abtidoon; Arabic: حسن جوليد أبتيدون; October 15, 1916 – November 21, 2006) was a Djiboutian politician who served as the first President of Djibouti from 1977 to 1999.

== Biography ==
He was born in the small village of Gerisa in the Lughaya district in British Somaliland. He was born into the Mamassan subset of the Issa clan. He played an important role in Djibouti's struggle for independence from France. Hassan Gouled began his career in the 1930s as a nurse. He was stationed in Dikhil in 1932. He was then an entrepreneur. In 1946, he founded with Mahamoud Harbi Farah the Somali and Dankali Youth Club. They were elected together in 1951 to the Representative Council of the colony, then separated. Hassan Gouled was elected French senator, against Mahmoud Harbi. He remained so from 1952 to 1957. Hassan Gouled campaigned against Mahamoud Harbi Farah of the Union Republicaine party, who sought to join the territory with neighboring Somalia. By the time of the 23 November 1958 elections, Mahamoud Harbi's party had disintegrated and with the majority of the Afar vote, his faction won election. Mahamoud Harbi subsequently fled Djibouti, and later died in a plane crash.

Hassan Gouled served as vice-president of the Government Council from 1958 to April 1959. Hassan Gouled also served in the French National Assembly 1959-1962 and the French Senate 1952–1958. He was defeated in parliamentary elections in 1962 by Moussa Ahmed Idriss of the Party of Popular Movement (PMP). In the 1960s, he led the Democratic Union Issa. It is a signatory to the agreement of Arta in September 1963. He was then education minister in a government led by Ali Aref Bourhan from 1963 to 1967. He was briefly jailed in July 1967, along with other officials of the PMP (which he had joined in 1965). He was elected to the Territorial Assembly in November 1968 and later became Minister of the Interior. Later he served as the first Prime Minister of Djibouti between May 1977 and July 1977.

== Towards independence ==
In 1974, Hassan Gouled called a vote with the support of François Mitterrand. He became president of the African People's League for Independence (LPAI) created in February 1975 by the merger of the African People's Union (UPA) and the League for the Future and Order. The General Secretary was Ahmed Dini.

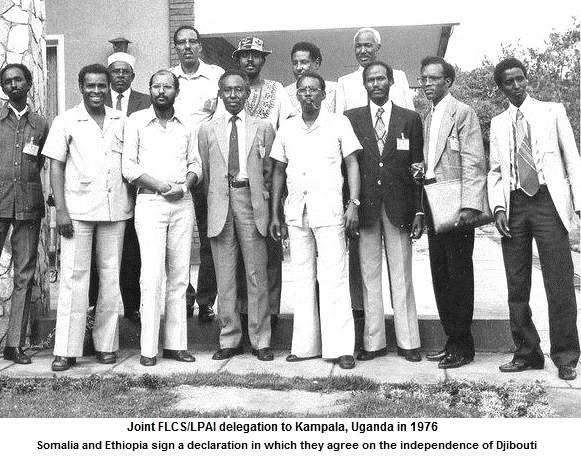
Joint FLCS-LPAI delegation to Kampala in 1976

He became President of the Governing Council on 18 May 1977 and was elected President of the future Republic of Djibouti on 28 May by the Chamber of Deputies. It remained so until 1999. After the attack on the "Zinc Palm" in December 1977, it banned the main opposition party, the MPL, and established a one-party system.

== Presidency ==
In 1981, Hassan Gouled turned the country into a one party state by declaring that his party, the People's Rally for Progress (Rassemblement populaire pour le progrès, RPP), was the sole legal one. As the RPP candidate, he was elected without opposition for a six-year term as president on 12 June 1981, receiving 84.58% of the vote. After the start of the Djiboutian Civil War in 1991, he allowed for a constitutional referendum on multiparty politics in September 1992, with four parties being permitted. In the parliamentary elections held in December 1992, only two parties competed, and the RPP won all 65 seats in the National Assembly. Gouled was reelected for a fourth term in May 1993 with 60.7% of the vote.

In the 1990s, the Djibouti economy deteriorated dramatically, with net external assets falling by 40 per cent. The World Bank issued "a correspondingly gloomy and highly critical" assessment, mentioning such social problems as the excessive consumption of the addictive and debilitating drug qat by Djibouti's citizens. During this period, Hassan Gouled's nephew Ismaïl Omar Guelleh not only maneuvered to be his successor, but increasingly came to handle affairs for the elderly Hassan Gouled.

On 4 February 1999, Gouled Aptidon announced that he would retire at the time of the next election, and an extraordinary congress of the RPP, the party chose Guelleh as its presidential candidate. Guelleh won the presidential election held in April 1999 and succeeded his uncle on 8 May 1999. Gouled Aptidon died at his home on 21 November 2006, aged 90.

Gouled's first wife, former First Lady Aïcha Bogoreh Darrar, a proponent of women's rights and various charities, died in 2001. He married his second wife after Bogoreh's death.

== Honours ==
=== Foreign honours ===
- Malaysia:
  - Honorary Recipient of the Order of the Crown of the Realm (1998)

Preceded by Position established	President of Djibouti; 1977–1999	Succeeded by Ismaïl Omar Guelleh
Preceded by Position established	Prime Minister of Djibouti; 1977	Succeeded by Ahmed Dini Ahmed
