= People's Rally for Progress =

Political party in Djibouti

People's Rally for Progress French: Rassemblement populaire pour le Progrès Arabic: التجمع الشعبي من أجل التقدم
- Leader: Ismaïl Omar Guelleh
- Founded: 4 March 1979 in Dikhil
- Headquarters: Djibouti City
- Ideology: Social welfarism Socialism
- Political position: Centre-left to left-wing
- National affiliation: Union for the Presidential Majority
- Colors: Green

Website
- www.rpp.dj

The People's Rally for Progress (Arabic: التجمع الشعبي من أجل التقدم, romanized: ạltãjamũʿu ạlsẖãʿ̊bīũ min ạảjal ạltãqadũma; French: Rassemblement populaire pour le Progrès, RPP) is a political party in Djibouti. It has dominated politics in the country since 1979, initially under the rule of President Hassan Gouled Aptidon. Today it is led by President Ismaïl Omar Guelleh and is in a coalition government with Front for the Restoration of Unity and Democracy (FRUD) and other parties. The RPP tends to hold more influence among the Issa population.

The RPP was founded in Dikhil on 4 March 1979. It was declared the sole legal party in October 1981, retaining this status until multiparty politics was introduced in the September 1992 referendum. At the party congress held on 19–20 March 1997, Gouled Aptidon was re-elected as RPP President and a 125-member Central Committee was elected. It contested the December 1997 parliamentary election in alliance with the moderate faction of FRUD (which had signed a peace agreement with the government in December 1994), and this alliance won 79% of the vote, taking all 65 seats in the National Assembly.

On 4 February 1999, President Gouled Aptidon announced that he would retire at the time of the next election, and an extraordinary congress of the RPP, chose Guelleh as its presidential candidate. As the joint candidate of the RPP and moderate wing of the Front for the Restoration of Unity and Democracy (FRUD), Guelleh won the presidential election held on 9 April 1999 with 74% of the vote, defeating his only challenger, the independent candidate Moussa Ahmed Idriss.

In the parliamentary election held on 10 January 2003, the party was part of the Union for a Presidential Majority (Union pour la Majorité Présidentielle, UMP), that won 63% of the popular vote and all 65 seats.

The RPP opened its Eighth Ordinary Congress on 4 March 2004, coinciding with the party's 25th anniversary. At this congress, Guelleh was unanimously re-elected as RPP President by acclamation for another three-year term, and the RPP Central Committee was expanded from 180 to 250 members. On 4 March 2007, the RPP held its Ninth Ordinary Congress; Guelleh was again re-elected as RPP President, and three women were added to the Political Bureau, expanding it to 17 members. It contested the February 2008 parliamentary election together with its UMP coalition partners, and the UMP again won all 65 seats amidst an opposition boycott.

== Electoral history ==
=== Presidential elections ===
Election	Party candidate	Votes	%	Result
1981	Hassan Gouled Aptidon	97,473	84.58%	Elected ✓
1987	Hassan Gouled Aptidon	90,675	99.23%	Elected ✓
1993	Hassan Gouled Aptidon	45,162	60.7%	Elected ✓
1999	Ismaïl Omar Guelleh	76,853	74.02%	Elected ✓
2005	Ismaïl Omar Guelleh	144,433	100%	Elected ✓
2011	Ismaïl Omar Guelleh	89,951	80.64%	Elected ✓
2016	Ismaïl Omar Guelleh	111,389	87.07%	Elected ✓
2021	Ismaïl Omar Guelleh	167,536	97.44%	Elected ✓
2026	Ismaïl Omar Guelleh	204,874	97.01%	Elected ✓

=== National Assembly elections ===
Election	Party leader	Votes	%	Seats	+/–	Position	Result
1977	Hassan Gouled Aptidon	as RPI	65.8%	65 / 65	▲65	▲1st	Supermajority government
1982	Hassan Gouled Aptidon	77,984	100%	65 / 65	Steady	1st	Sole legal party
1987	Hassan Gouled Aptidon	88,193	100%	65 / 65	Steady	1st	Sole legal party
1992	Hassan Gouled Aptidon	53,578	74.59%	65 / 65	Steady	1st	Supermajority government
1997	Hassan Gouled Aptidon	72,073 joint candidate list with FRUD	78.56%	54 / 65	Steady	1st	RPP-FRUD coalition government
2003	Ismaïl Omar Guelleh	53,293 as part of the UMP	62.7%	65 / 65	Steady	1st	UMP coalition government
2008	Ismaïl Omar Guelleh	103,463 as part of the UMP	94.06%	65 / 65	Steady	1st	UMP coalition government
2013	Ismaïl Omar Guelleh	74,016 as part of the UMP	61.5%	55 / 65	▼10	1st	UMP coalition government
2018	Ismaïl Omar Guelleh	105,278 as part of the UMP	87.83%	57 / 65	▲2	1st	UMP coalition government
2023	Ismaïl Omar Guelleh	159,658 as part of the UMP	93.68%	58 / 65	▲1	1st	UMP coalition government

== See also ==
- Mohamed Dini Farah
