= Hasna =

Hasna (Arabic: حسناء) is a feminine given name meaning beauty in Arabic. Notable people with this name include:

== Given name ==
- Hasna Begum (1935–2020), Bangladeshi philosopher and feminist
- Hasna Benhassi (born 1978), Moroccan middle-distance runner
- Hasna Barkat Daoud, Djiboutian lawyer and politician
- Hasna Mohamed Dato (born 1959), Djiboutian politician
- Hasna Doreh, Somali commander
- Hasna Hassan Ali, Djiboutian politician
- Hasna Jasimuddin Moudud (born 1946), Bangladeshi writer and politician
- M. Hasna Maznavi (1985–2025), American writer and activist
- Hasna Sal (born 1972), American glass sculptor
- Hasna Xhukiçi (born 1988), Albanian model
