= Ministries of Djibouti =

Departments within the government of Djibouti

The Ministries of Djibouti are headed by the Cabinet. It runs the day-to-day operations of the Government of Djibouti. The Council of Ministers is in turn appointed by the President, the actual head of government, on the proposal of the Prime Minister, who serves as its most senior minister.

Ministry	Title of Minister	Incumbent
Ministry of Agriculture, Livestock, & Fisheries	Minister of Agriculture, Livestock, & Fisheries	Mohamed Ahmed Awaleh
Ministry of Communication & Culture	Minister of Communication & Culture	Ali Hassan Bahdon
Ministry of Defense	Minister of Defense	Hassan Darar Houffaneh
Ministry of Economy, Finance, & Planning	Minister of Economy, Finance, & Planning	Ilyas Moussa Dawaleh
Ministry of Education & Professional Training	Minister of Education & Professional Training	Djama Elmi Okieh
Ministry of Energy & Water	Minister of Energy & Water	Ali Yacoub
Ministry of Foreign Affairs & Intl. Cooperation	Minister of Foreign Affairs & Intl. Cooperation	Mahamoud Ali Youssouf
Ministry of Habitat, Urban Planning, Environment, & Town Planning	Minister of Habitat, Urban Planning, Environment, & Town Planning	Mohamed Moussa Ibrahim Balala
Ministry of Health	Minister of Health	Kassim Issack Osman
Ministry of Infrastructure & Transport	Minister of Infrastructure & Transport	Moussa Ahmed Hassan
Ministry of Interior	Minister of Interior	Hassan Omar Mohamed Bourhan
Ministry of Justice & Penal Affairs	Minister of Justice & Penal Affairs	Ali Farah Assoweh
Ministry of Labor	Minister of Labor	Adbi Houssein Ahmed
Ministry of Muslim Affairs & Charitable Assets	Minister of Muslim Affairs & Charitable Assets	Aden Ali Aden
Ministry of the Promotion of Women & Family Welfare & Social Affairs	Minister of the Promotion of Women & Family Welfare & Social Affairs	Hasna Barkat Daoud
Ministry of Women and Family	Minister for Women and the Family (and Social Affairs and Solidarity)	Mouna Osman Aden
