= Ministry of Women and Family (Djibouti) =

Government organization in Djibouti

Ministry of Women and Family Djibouti is a governmental organization in Djibouti that is dedicated to promoting gender equality, empowering women and supporting families in Djibouti. It was established in 2008 as ministry of women and family affairs but the agency has been in existence since 1999.

== Ministers ==
- Hawa Ahmed Youssouf – 1999–2005
- Aïcha Mohamed Robleh – 2005–2010
- Hasna Barkat Daoud – 2010–2016
- Moumina Houmed Hassan – 2016–2024
- Mouna Osman Aden – from 2024

== See also ==
- Ministries of Djibouti
