= Mohamed Ali Mohamed =

Djiboutian politician

Minister of Economy and Finance of Djibouti
- In office June 1995 – December 1997
- Preceded by: Ahmed Aden Youssouf
- Succeeded by: Yacin Elmi Bouh

Personal details
- Party: People's Rally for Progress

Mohamed Ali Mohamed (Somali: Maxamed Cali Maxamed) (born 29 April 1952) was a Djiboutian politician of the People's Rally for Progress (PDP).

Mohamed was born in the city of Djibouti. He worked at the Ministry of Trade and was first elected to the National Assembly of Djibouti in May 1982. In the December 1992 parliamentary election, he was the seventh candidate on the RPP candidate list for Djibouti city. After serving as Minister of the Economy, he was appointed as Minister of Finance and the Economy on 8 June 1995. As Minister of Finance, he announced austerity measures on 15 August 1995, following an International Monetary Fund recommendation for reduced government spending. In addition to raising the income tax by 50%, these measures aimed at reducing the amount spent on the civil service. Mohamed hoped that spending could be reduced by 6.6 billion Djiboutian francs in the period from September 1995 to December 1996.

In the December 1997 parliamentary election, Mohamed was re-elected as the second candidate on the joint candidate list of the RPP and the Front for the Restoration of Unity and Democracy (FRUD) for Djibouti city. On 28 December 1997, he was moved from his position as Minister of Finance to that of Minister of Labour and Vocational Training; subsequently, he was appointed as Minister of Energy and Natural Resources on 12 May 1999. He was also Secretary-General of the RPP until a session of the RPP Central Committee on 4 July 2003 chose Idriss Arnaoud Ali to replace Mohamed.

In the January 2003 parliamentary election, Mohamed was re-elected to the National Assembly as the second candidate on the candidate list of the ruling coalition, the Union for a Presidential Majority (UMP), in Djibouti city. He was not included on the UMP candidate list in the February 2008 parliamentary election and was succeeded by Moussa Bouh Odowa as Minister of Energy and Natural Resources on 31 March 2008. Mohamed was appointed as Technical Adviser to the Prime Minister on 1 April 2008.
