= Economy of Djibouti =

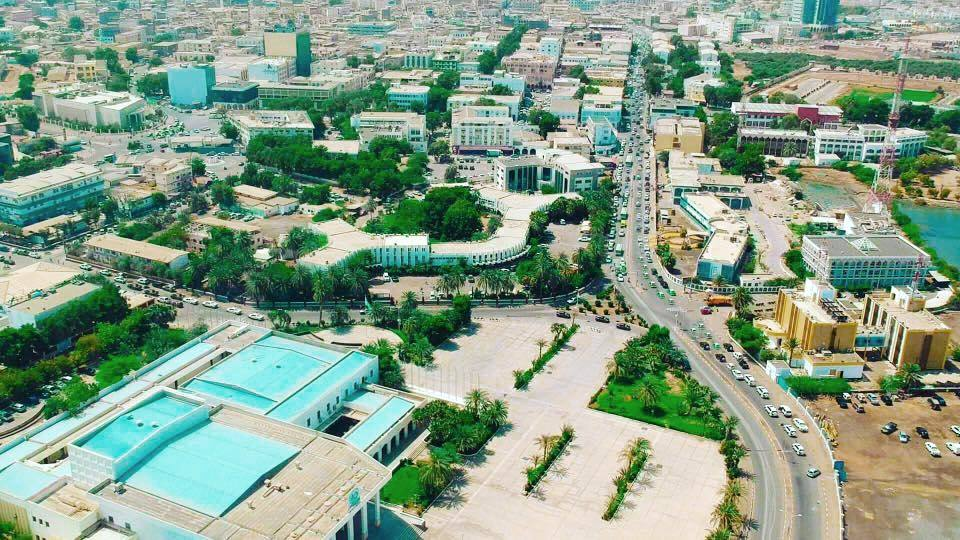
- A view of Djibouti's central district
- Currency: Djiboutian franc (DJF)
- Fixed exchange rates: U.S. dollar = 177.721 DJF
- Fiscal year: Calendar year
- Trade organisations: AL, AU, CEN-SAD, IGAD

Statistics
- GDP: ▲$5.003 billion (nominal, 2026); ▲$10.72 billion (PPP, 2026)
- GDP growth: 6.0% (2025); 6.0% (2026e)
- GDP per capita: ▲$4,681 (nominal, 2026); ▲$10,030 (PPP, 2026)
- GDP per capita growth: 5.1% (2025)
- GDP by sector: Agriculture: 2.58%; Industry: 15.44%; Services: 81.98%; (2024 est.)
- Inflation (CPI): ▼1.4% (2026)
- Population below national poverty line: 23%
- Human Development Index: ▼0.513 low (2023) (175st); ▲0.341 low IHDI (2023)
- Labour force: 294,600 (2012 est.)
- Labour force by occupation: Agriculture: 10%; Industry: 21.2%; Tertiary sector of the economy
- Unemployment: 40% (2017 est.)
- Youth unemployment: ▲76.8% (2025)
- Main industries: Dairy, Fishing, Salt, Construction, Mining

External
- Exports: $155.5 million (2017 est.)
- Export goods: Reexports, Hides and skins, Coffee, Scrap metal
- Main export partners: Ethiopia 76.5% (2023)
- Imports: $1.172 billion (2017 est.)
- Import goods: Machinery and Equipment, Foodstuffs, Beverages, Chemicals, Petroleum products, Consumer Goods
- Main import partners: China 31.7%; India 12.1%; UAE 9.58% (2023)

Public finance
- Government debt: 85% (2017 est.)
- Revenue: $615 million
- Spending: $860 million
- All values, unless otherwise stated, are in US dollars.

Djibouti has a developing economy. Its economic potential is derived in large part from its strategic location on the Red Sea. Djibouti is mostly barren, with little development in the agricultural and industrial sectors. The country has a harsh climate, a largely unskilled labour force, and limited natural resources. The country's most important economic asset is its strategic location, connecting the Red Sea and the Gulf of Aden. As such, Djibouti's economy is commanded by the services sector, providing services as both a transit port for the region and as an international transshipment and refueling centre.

From 1991 to 1994, Djibouti experienced a civil war which had devastating effects on the economy. Since then, the country has benefited from political stability. In recent years, Djibouti has seen significant improvement in macroeconomic stability, with its annual gross domestic product improving at an average of over 3 percent since 2003. This comes after a decade of negative or low growth and is attributed to fiscal adjustment aimed at improving public financing, reforms in port management and foreign investment.

Despite the recent modest and stable growth, Djibouti is faced with many economic challenges, particularly job creation and poverty reduction. With an average annual population growth rate of 2.5 percent, the economy cannot significantly benefit national income per capita growth. Unemployment is extremely high, with some estimates placing it at almost 60 percent, and is a major contributor to widespread poverty. In recent years, the country's dependence on Chinese investment and debt has also come under scrutiny.

According to a 2020 report by the World bank, Djibouti was 112th among 190 economies when it comes to the ease of doing business.

== Economic performance ==
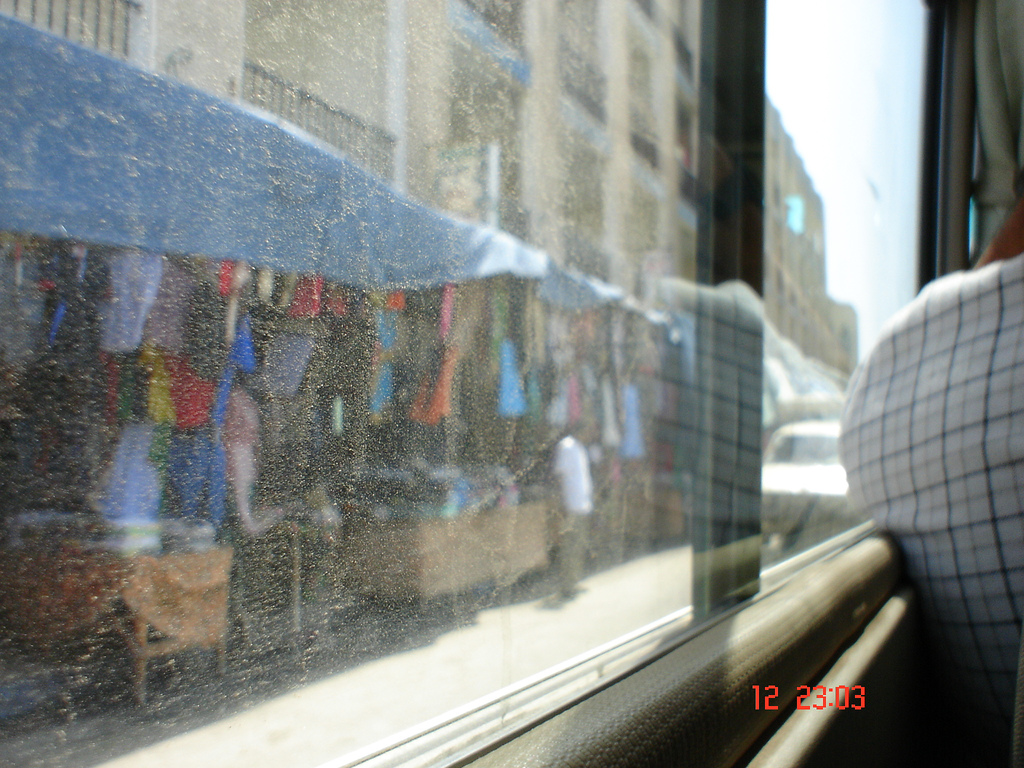
Bus down the central market in Djibouti City.

After experiencing armed conflict and economic hardship during the 1990s, Djibouti has experienced stable economic growth in recent years as a result of relative political stability and achievements in macroeconomic adjustment efforts.

Fiscal adjustment measures included downsizing the civil service, implementing a pension reform that placed the system on a much stronger financial footing, and strengthening public expenditure institutions. From 2003 to 2005, annual real GDP growth averaged 3.1 percent in the mid-2000s, driven by good performance in the services sector, strong consumption and reached a value as high as 7.8 percent in 2019. In the 21st century, inflation has been kept low through fixed pegging of the Djibouti franc to the US dollar, but experienced a sharp spike in the late 2000s, when it reached values three times higher than the average of the last 20 years.

Despite experiencing economic growth, the country continues to struggle with high unemployment. Official numbers put the unemployment rate at just over 10 percent, but international estimates consider it to be closer to 60 percent. Furthermore, reliance on diesel-generated electricity and the need to import basic necessities like food and water leave average consumers vulnerable to global price shocks.

Djibouti's gross domestic product expanded by an average of more than 6 percent per year, from US$341 million in 1985 to US$3.3 billion in 2019.

Low tax revenue and high spending on public infrastructure has seen Djibouti struggle with its budget deficit. Additionally, the country's public debt has increased sharply—from 50.2 percent of GDP in 2015 to an expected 72.9 percent in 2020.

=== Impact of COVID-19 ===
Despite not being hit as hard as other countries by the COVID-19 pandemic, Djibouti's economy suffered the effects of the global slowdown in trade and diminished traffic through the Doraleh port. Real GDP growth slumped to 1.4 percent in 2020 from 7.8 percent in 2019. The pandemic also contributed to a sharp deceleration in investment, which increased by just 10.3 percent of GDP in 2020, compared to a 26.3 percent growth in 2019, as well as in the value added by the services sector, which saw a modest 2 percent increase in 2020, after growing by 8.2 percent in 2019.

Djibouti's recovery projections are closely tied to the timeframe in which global shipping and trade will return to pre-pandemic levels, with a full recovery expected to happen in the following couple of years, if the COVID-19 pandemic does not last beyond the second half of 2021.

== Balance of payments ==
Djibouti's merchandise trade balance has shown a large deficit. This is due to the country's enormous need for imports and narrow base of exports. Although Djibouti runs a substantial surplus in its services balance, the surplus has been smaller than the deficit in the merchandise trade balance. As a result, Djibouti's has developed a high level of trade deficit, reaching a peak of 130 billion Djibouti francs in 2019.

== Regional situation ==
Positioned on a primary shipping lane between the Gulf of Aden and the Red Sea, Djibouti holds considerable strategic value in the international trade and shipping industries. The facilities of the Port of Djibouti are important to sea transportation companies for fuel bunkering and refuelling. Its transport facilities are used by several landlocked African countries for the re-export of their goods. Djibouti earns transit taxes and harbour fees from this trade, these form the bulk of government revenue. Threats of pirates patrolling the Gulf of Aden, off the coast of Somalia, with the intentions of capturing large cargo ships, oil, and chemical tankers has created the need for larger nations such as the United States, France, and Japan to embed logistics bases or military camps from which they can defend their freight from piracy.

The port of Djibouti functions as a small French naval facility, and the United States has also stationed hundreds of troops in Camp Lemonnier, Djibouti, its only African base, in an effort to counter terrorism in the region.

Since 2010 China has become an important trading and military partner for Djibouti, including it in its African Road and Belt Initiative through the construction of infrastructure projects like a railway link to Ethiopia and the Doraleh port. In 2017, it also began operating a large naval base near de Doraleh port, which serves as China's first ever overseas military base. In 2009, China overtook the United States in becoming Djibouti's largest trading partner. Between 57 percent and 70 percent of Djibouti's debt is made up of Chinese loans.

Chinese influence in Djibouti, particularly through its military base and financial debt, has been criticized in recent years as being more beneficial to the stability of the current political regime than for the country as a whole.

== Sectors ==
=== Agriculture ===
Agriculture is the third economic activity in Djibouti which makes up only 3 percent of the wider economy value. Djibouti depends on imports in most foods. Climatic conditions and poor soils limit farm output, and domestic food production meets about 15% of demand. 10% of the Djiboutian workforce are employed in agriculture.

=== Tourism ===
In 2013, 63,000 foreign tourists visited Djibouti, Djibouti City is the principal tourist destination for visitors, revenues from tourism fell just US$43 million in 2013.

== Infrastructure ==
=== Energy ===
Djibouti's electrical energy is supplied primarily by thermal plants (about 120 MW) and imported hydroelectricity from Ethiopia. However, the supplemental supply of power from Ethiopia does not always satisfy Djibouti's demand for power. According to USAID's Energy sector overview for Djibouti, Djibouti has the potential to generate more than 300MW of electrical power from renewable energy sources, and much more from other resources. Based on 2020 data, Djibouti's national electrification rate reached 42%, (1% in rural areas, 54% in urban areas).

=== Transport ===
Transport in Djibouti is facilitated through a relatively young system of roads, railways and ports.

=== Telecommunications ===
Telecommunications in Djibouti falls under the authority of the Ministry of Communication & Culture.

== Trade ==
Exports of Djibouti by product category (2019) Chemical products Transportation Machines Mineral products Plastics and rubbers Metals Foodstuffs Precious metals Textiles Instruments Animal products Vegetable products Paper goods Footwear and headwear Miscellaneous Stone and glass Wood products Animal and vegetable bi-products Animal hides Arts and antiques Weapons

Principal exports from the region transiting Djibouti are coffee, salt, hides, dried beans, cereals, other agricultural products, chalk, and wax. Djibouti itself has few exports, and the majority of its imports come from France. Most imports are consumed in Djibouti and the remainder goes to Ethiopia and Somalia. Djibouti's unfavorable balance of trade is offset partially by invisible earnings such as transit taxes and harbor dues. In 1999, U.S. exports to Djibouti totalled $26.7 million while U.S. imports from Djibouti were less than $1 million. The City of Djibouti has the only paved airport in the republic.

Djibouti requires an Electronic Cargo Tracking Note (ECTN, also known as BESC) for all import cargo; carriers must show the ECTN number on the bill of lading, and the note is obtained at the port of loading through a platform approved by the Djibouti Ports and Free Zones Authority.

=== Free trade zone ===
In July 2018, Djibouti inaugurated the first phase of the Djibouti International Free Trade Zone (DIFTZ), developed by the Djibouti Ports and Free Zones Authority together with Chinese partners including China Merchants Group and the Dalian Port Authority. The initial 240-hectare phase represented an investment of about US$370 million; on completion the zone is planned to cover 4,800 hectares — which would make it the largest free trade zone in Africa — for a total investment of around US$3.5 billion.

== Investment climate ==
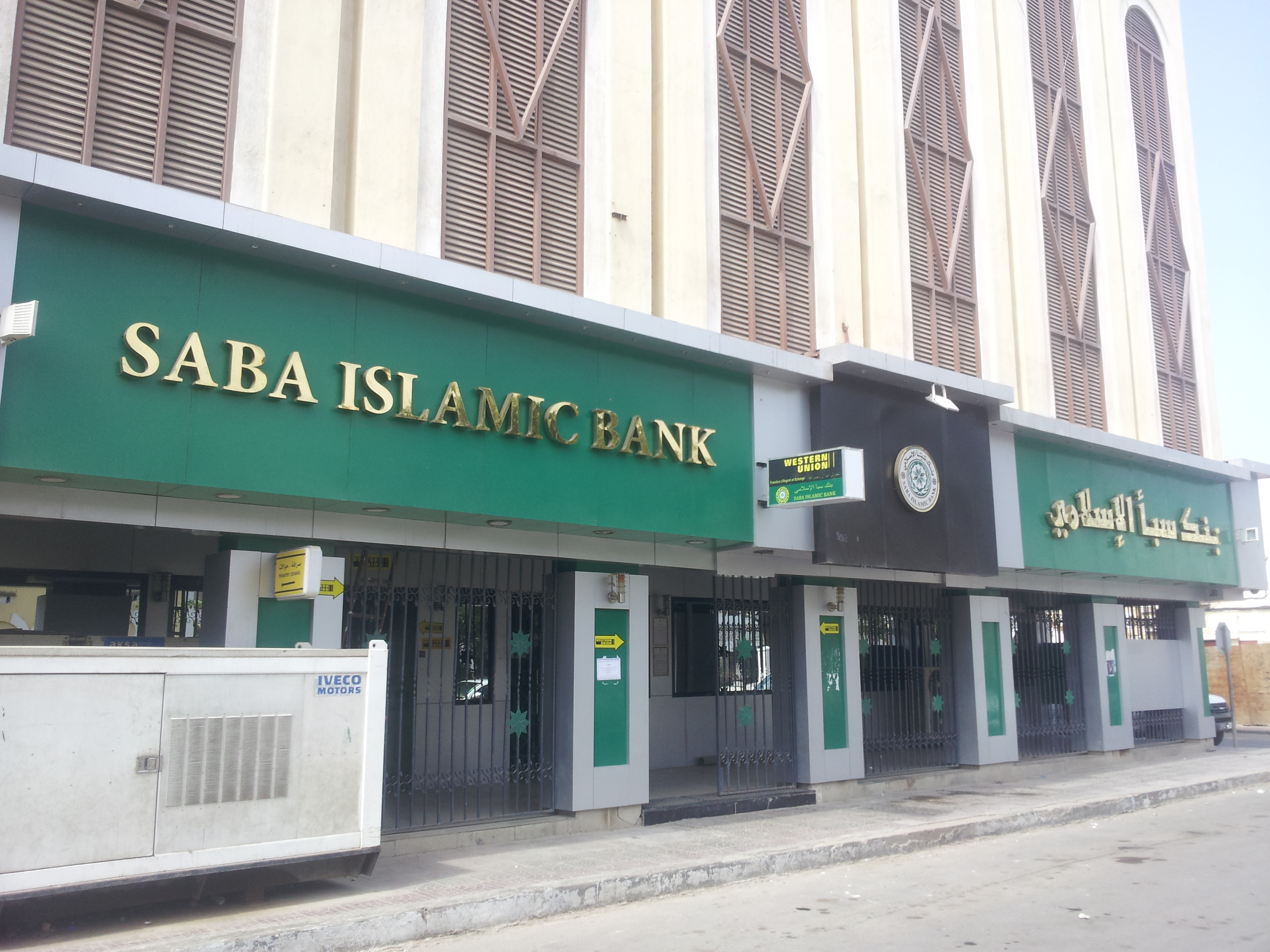
A Saba Islamic Bank branch in Djibouti City

=== Background ===
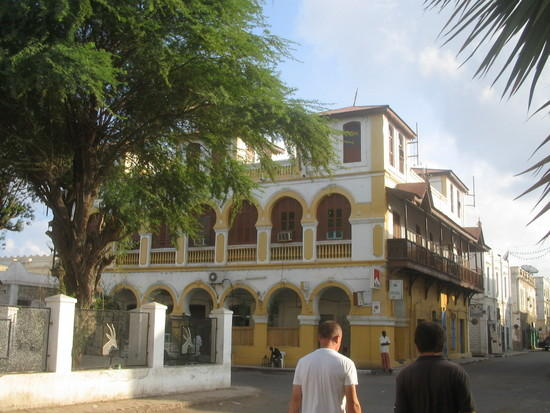
European Quarter, Djibouti City

Djibouti's economy is based on service activities connected with the country's strategic location and status as a free trade zone in the Horn of Africa. Two-thirds of inhabitants live in the capital and the remainder of the populace is mostly nomadic herders. Low amounts of rainfall limit crop production to fruits and vegetables, and requiring most food to be imported. The government provides services as both a transit port for the region and an international transshipment and refueling centre. Djibouti has few natural resources and little industry. All of these factors contribute to its heavy dependence on foreign assistance to help support its balance of payments and to finance development projects.

An unemployment rate of 60 percent continues to be a major problem. Inflation is not a concern, however, because of the fixed tie of the franc to the US dollar. Per capita consumption dropped an estimated 35 percent over the last seven years because of recession, civil war, and a high population growth rate. Faced with a multitude of economic difficulties, the government has fallen in arrears on long-term external debt and has been struggling to meet the stipulations of foreign aid donors.

The Djiboutian franc has been pegged to the US dollar since 1949 through a currency board. This arrangement has remained in place since its inception.

According to a financial risk assessment from 2018, the country has been suffering from increasing corruption and a decline in international governance and transparency indices, growing debt and over-reliance on Ethiopia and China for trade and FDI, respectively.

=== Openness to foreign investment ===
Officially, the government of Djibouti welcomes all foreign direct investment. Djibouti's assets include a strategic geographic location, an open trade regime, a stable currency, substantial tax breaks and other incentives. Potential areas of investment include Djibouti's port and the telecommunications sectors. President Ismail Omar Guellehh first elected in 1999, has named privatization, economic reform, and increased foreign investment as top priorities for his government. The president pledged to seek the help of the international private sector to develop the country's infrastructure.

Djibouti has no major laws that would discourage incoming foreign investment. In principle there is no screening of investment or other discriminatory mechanisms. However, a number of hurdles to foreign investment in the country exist. For example, certain sectors, most notably public utilities, are state owned and some parts are not currently open to investors. In 2017, a law was passed granting the government the right to unilaterally alter or terminate contracts with foreign entities. Conditions of the structural adjustment agreement recently signed by Djibouti and the International Monetary Fund stipulate increased privatization of parastatal and government-owned monopolies. There are no patent laws in Djibouti.

Furthermore, there are concerns about the rule of law, the independence of courts, and how this affects the protection of investments in the country. A Freedom House report, for example, mentions the case of Dubai-based port operator DP World which has been embroiled in a legal battle with Djibouti since 2012, "when Djibouti sold part of its concession in the Doraleh Container Terminal to a Chinese state-owned competitor of DP World, the original concession partner."

In 2018, Djibouti seized DP World's port assets, but ruling the nationalization illegal, the London Court of International Arbitration in 2019 ordered Djibouti to restore the rights and benefits of the concession to DP World. The country subsequently rejected the ruling and asked the Djibouti high court to unilaterally nullify the LCIA decision.

A Santander report concluded that despite its strategic importance, FDI into Djibouti is hampered by "mediocre governance, corruption, the lack of a sound judicial framework, an unstable regional geopolitical situation, a poorly diversified economy with little resilience to outside shocks, and a fragile ecosystem prone to environmental crisis."

As in most African nations, access to licenses and approvals is complicated not so much by law as by administrative procedures. In Djibouti, the administrative process has been characterized as a form of 'circular dependency.' For example, the finance ministry will issue a license only if an investor possesses an approved investor visa, while the interior ministry will only issue an investor visa to a licensed business. The Djiboutian government is increasingly realizing the importance of establishing a one-stop shop to facilitate the investment process.

=== Gender ===
In May 2015 Choukri Djibah, Director of Gender in the Department of Women and Family, launched the project SIHA (Strategic Initiative for the Horn of Africa) designed to support and reinforce the economic capacity of women in Djibouti, funded with a grant from the European Union of 28 Million Djibouti francs.

== Macro-economic trend ==
The following table shows the main economic indicators in 1990-2026. Inflation below 5% is in green.

Year	GDP			GDP growth (real)	Inflation	Government debt (% of GDP)
Year	Total (bil. US$ PPP)	Per capita (US$ PPP)	Total (bil. US$ nominal)	GDP growth (real)	Inflation	Government debt (% of GDP)
1990	n/a	n/a	0.6	n/a	▲n/a	n/a
1995	▲1.5	▲2442	▲0.7	▼ -3.5	▲4.9	n/a
2000	▲1.7	▼2300	▲0.8	▲0.7	▲1.2	n/a
2005	▲2.1	▲2715	▲1.0	▲3.1	▲3.3	n/a
2006	▲2.3	▲2892	▲1.1	▲4.8	▲3.5	n/a
2007	▲2.5	▲3077	▲1.2	▲5	▲5.9	n/a
2008	▲2.7	▲3274	▲1.4	▲5.8	▲8.7	n/a
2009	2.7	▲3301	1.4	▲1.6	▲5.6	▲29.5
2010	▲2.9	▲3429	▲1.5	▲4.1	▲2.5	▼27.9
2011	▲3.2	▲3696	▲1.7	▲7.3	▲5.2	▼25.7
2012	▲3.4	▲3881	▲1.9	▲4.8	▲4.2	▼25.0
2013	▲3.6	▲4073	▲2.0	▲5	▲1.1	▼24.6
2014	▲3.9	▲4366	▲2.2	▲7.2	▲1.3	▲26.9
2015	▲4.3	▲4649	▲2.4	▲7.3	▲ -0.5	▲40.3
2016	▲4.6	▲4946	▲2.6	▲7.1	▲2.4	▲45.9
2017	▲4.9	▲5225	▲2.8	▲5.5	▲0.6	▲48.0
2018	▲5.4	▲5682	▲2.9	▲4.8	▲0.1	▼47.5
2019	▲5.9	▲6036	▲3.1	▲5.5	▲3.3	▼41.1
2020	▲6.1	▲6183	3.1	▲1.2	▲1.8	▲42.1
2021	▲6.7	▲6668	▲3.4	▲4.4	▲1.2	▼40.3
2022	▲7.5	▲7409	▲3.6	▲5.2	▲5.2	▼38.3
2023	▲8.3	▲8097	▲3.9	▲6.8	▲1.4	▼35.6
2024	▲9.1	▲8764	▲4.2	▲7	▲2.1	▼34.0
2025	▲10.0	▲9436	▲4.4	▲6	▲ -0.3	▼32.1
2026	▲10.9	▲10166	▲4.7	▲6	▲1.5	▼29.6

== See also ==
- Transport in Djibouti
- Ministry of Economy and Finance (Djibouti)
- Djibouti and the World Bank
- IMF Relations with Djibouti
- List of companies based in Djibouti
- United Nations Economic Commission for Africa
