= Souleiman Miyir Ali =

Djiboutian politician

Souleiman Miyir Ali (born 1961) is a Djiboutian politician and a member of the Pan-African Parliament from Djibouti.

Ali, a member of the People's Rally for Progress (RPP), was first elected to the National Assembly in the December 1997 parliamentary election as the 10th candidate on the joint candidate list of the RPP and the Front for the Restoration of Unity and Democracy (FRUD) in Djibouti Region. He was re-elected in the January 2003 parliamentary election as the 12th candidate on the candidate list of the Union for a Presidential Majority (UMP) coalition in Djibouti Region.

On 10 March 2004, Ali was chosen by the National Assembly as one of Djibouti's initial five members of the Pan-African Parliament. In the National Assembly, he served as President of the Legislation and General Administration Commission during the same parliamentary term.

Ali was re-elected to the National Assembly in the February 2008 parliamentary election as the 12th candidate on the UMP's candidate list for Djibouti Region. Following the election, he was re-elected as President of the Legislation and General Administration Commission on 25 February 2008.

== See also ==
- List of members of the Pan-African Parliament
