= Djibouti Union for Democracy and Justice =

Political party in Djibouti

Djibouti Union for Democracy and Justice French: Union Djiboutienne pour la Démocratie et la Justice Arabic: الاتحاد الجيبوتي من أجل الديمقراطية والعدالة
- Leader: Ilaya Ismail Guedi Hared
- Founded: 2002
- Ideology: Political liberties advocacy
- Political position: Big tent
- National Assembly: 7 / 65

The Djibouti Union for Democracy and Justice (French: Union Djiboutienne pour la Démocratie et la Justice, Arabic: الاتحاد الجيبوتي من أجل الديمقراطية والعدالة) is a political party in Djibouti.

== History ==
The party was founded in 2002 when a restriction of the 1992 constitution was removed allowing for more than just 4 political parties. under the leadership of Ilaya Ismail Guedi Hared, a former cabinet director for President Hassan Gouled Aptidon. The party's secretary general, Farah Ali Waberi, resigned in 2005 to protest the Union for Democratic Change's (UAD's) decision to boycott the 2005 Djiboutian presidential election. The party opposed the 2010 amendment to the constitution that allowed Ismaïl Omar Guelleh to run for a third term. Hared's niece, Zahra Guedi was elected to lead a UAD diaspora group in Paris in November 2013. The party ran in a coalition with the Djibouti Party for Development in 2018 winning several seats in the National Assembly.

=== 2023 election ===
During the 2023 Djiboutian parliamentary election, all opposition political parties boycotted the election to protest the undemocratic leadership of Ismaïl Omar Guelleh and the erosion of political and press freedoms across the country. The UBJ was the sole exception, and besides Guelleh's Union for the Presidential Majority, was the only party to contest the election. The party won 6.32% of the popular vote and 7 seats in the National Assembly. Abdulmalik Jama Ali, one of the party's representatives in the assembly, stated that the party was happy with the conduct of the election.

== Electoral history ==
=== National Assembly elections ===
Election	Party leader	Votes	%	Seats	+/–	Position	Result
2003	Ilaya Ismail Guedi Hared	31,581 as part of the UAD	37.60%	0 / 65	New	2nd	Extra-parliamentary
2008	Ilaya Ismail Guedi Hared	Election boycotted					Extra-parliamentary
2013	Ilaya Ismail Guedi Hared	42,897 as part of the USN	35.66%	10 / 65	▲10	2nd	Opposition
2018	Ilaya Ismail Guedi Hared	13,088 joint list with PDD	10.92%	5 / 65	▼5	2nd	Opposition
2023	Ilaya Ismail Guedi Hared	10,772	6.32%	7 / 65	▲2	2nd	Opposition
