= 2018 Djiboutian parliamentary election =

← 2013	23 February 2018	2023 →

All 65 seats in the National Assembly 33 seats needed for a majority
- Registered: 194,169
- Turnout: 63.83% (▼2.77pp)
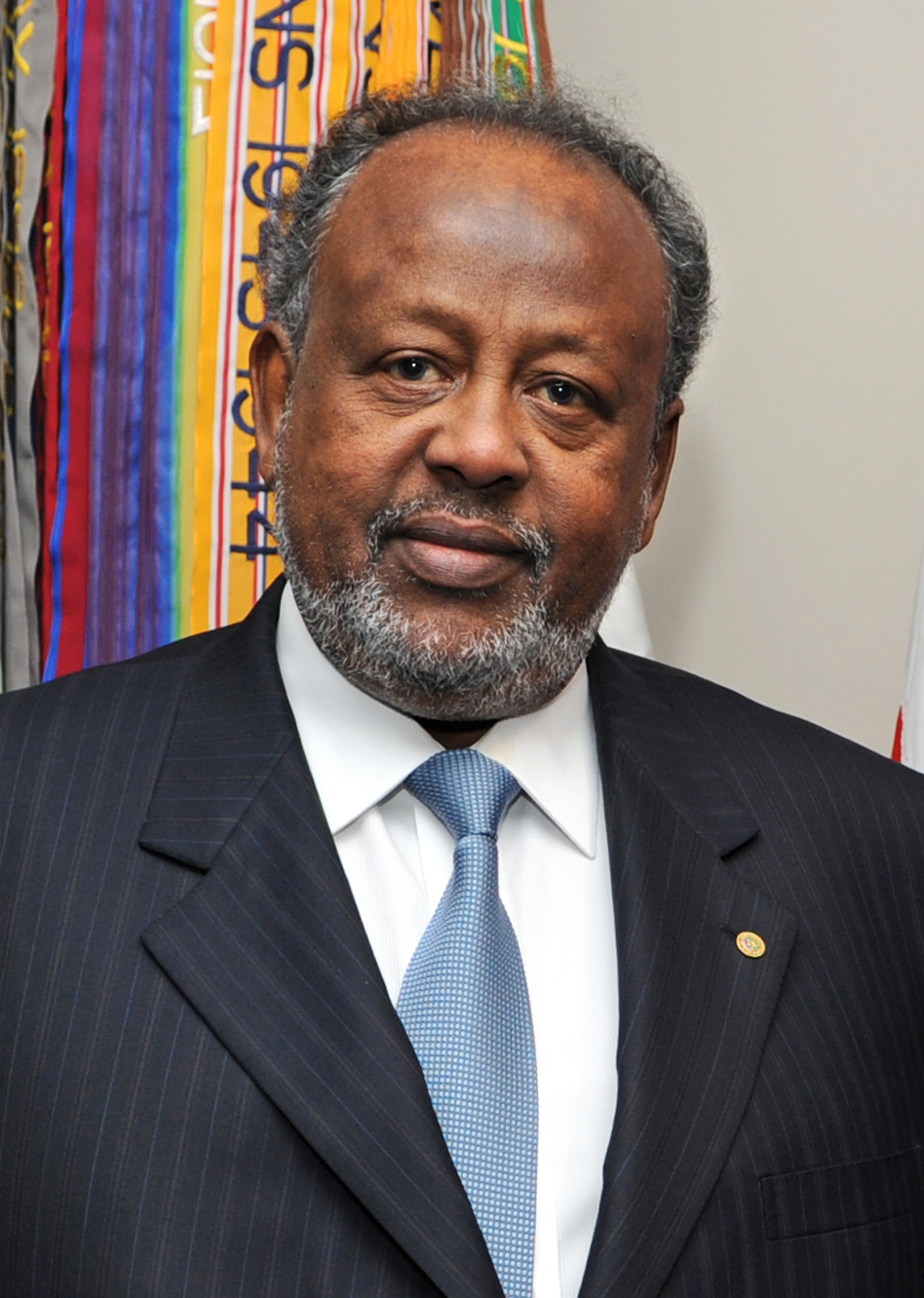

	First party	Second party
Leader	Ismaïl Omar Guelleh
Party	UMP	UDJ–PDD
Seats won	57	7
Seat change	▲2	New
Popular vote	105,278	13,088
Percentage	87.83%	10.92%
Swing	▲26.30pp	New
- Results by region
President of the National Assembly before election
Mohamed Ali Houmed
RPP
Elected President of the National Assembly
Mohamed Ali Houmed
RPP

Parliamentary elections were held in Djibouti on 23 February 2018. The election was boycotted by the main opposition parties, including some of the parties in the Union for National Salvation coalition, which had won 10 seats in the previous elections in 2013.

According to government figures, the ruling Union for the Presidential Majority won 57 of 65 seats in Parliament. The opposition Union for Democracy and Justice–Djibouti Party for Development (UDJ–PDD) won seven seats in Djibouti city electoral district. The UMP ran unopposed in three electoral districts (Dikhil, Obock and Arta, 18 seats).

== Electoral system ==
The elections were held using a closed list system in which 80% of seats (rounded to the nearest integer) in each constituency were awarded to the party receiving the most votes. The remaining seats were allocated proportionally to other parties receiving over 10% of the vote using the D'Hondt method. In cases where no other party received more than 10% of the vote, all seats in a constituency were awarded to the party receiving the most votes. There was also a 25% female quota, up from 10% in the previous election.

== Results ==
Party	Votes	%	Seats	+/–
Union for the Presidential Majority	105,278	87.83	57	+2
UDJ–PDD	13,088	10.92	7	–
Centre of Unified Democrats	811	0.68	1	+1
Republican Alliance for Development	684	0.57	0	–
Total	119,861	100.00	65	0
Valid votes	119,861	96.71		
Invalid/blank votes	4,073	3.29		
Total votes	123,934	100.00		
Registered voters/turnout	194,169	63.83		
Source: Presidency of Djibouti, IPU

=== By region ===
Region	UMP		UDJ–PDD		CUD		RAD	
Region	%	S	%	S	%	S	%	S
Djibouti	80.6	28	19.4	7	-	-	-	-
Arta	100.0	3	-	-	-	-	-	-
Ali Sabeh	89.5	5	-	-	10.5	1	-	-
Dikhil	100.0	11	-	-	-	-	-	-
Tadjourah	94.8	6	-	-		-	5.2	0
Obock	100.0	4	-	-	-	-	-	-
Total	87.8	57	10.9	7	0.7	1	0.6	0
