= List of political parties in Djibouti =

Djibouti is a one-party dominant state with the People's Rally for Progress currently in power. There are currently no opposition members in the National Assembly, partially because of the rule that the party or coalition with a majority vote in each district wins all of that district's seats. This voting system is seen to facilitate the dominance of the pro-presidential coalition. The main opposition coalitions are the Union for Democratic Change (UAD) and Union for Democratic Movements (UMD).

== Parties ==
=== Coalitions ===
Coalition	Abbr.	Parties	Ideology	Seats
Union for the Presidential Majority; Union pour la majorité présidentielle	UMP	List of parties: People's Rally for Progress; Front for the Restoration of Unity and Democracy; National Democratic Party; Social Democratic People's Party; Union of Reform Partisans	Social democracy	58 / 65
Union for National Salvation; Union pour le Salut National	USN	List of parties: National Democratic Party; Republican Alliance for Democracy; Movement for Democratic Renewal and Development; Djibouti Party for Development; Djibouti Union for Democracy and Justice; Movement for Development and Freedom		7 / 65

=== Pro-government ===
Name	Native name	Ideology	Notes
People's Rally for Progress	Rassemblement populaire pour le Progrès	Socialism	Dominant party since 1979
Front for the Restoration of Unity and Democracy	Front pour la Restauration de l'Unité et de la Démocratie	Afar interests Third Way; Liberal socialism	Party representing afar peoples
Social Democratic People's Party	Parti Populaire Social Démocrate	Social democracy	Formed by a former RPP minister
Union of Reform Partisans	Union des Partisans de la Réforme	N/A	Formed as an offshoot of FRUD

=== Anti-government ===
Name	Native name	Ideology	Notes
National Democratic Party	Parti National Démocratique	N/A	Boycotted its first election
Republican Alliance for Democracy	Alliance Républicaine pour la Démocratie	N/A	Former member of the Union for a Democratic Change
Movement for Democratic Renewal and Development	Mouvement pour le Renouveau Démocratique et le Développement	Conservatism	Former ally of the Front for the Restoration of Unity and Democracy
Djibouti Party for Development	Parti Djiboutien pour le Développement	N/A	N/A
Djibouti Union for Democracy and Justice	Union Djiboutienne pour la Démocratie et la Justice	N/A	N/A

=== Defunct ===
Name	Native name	Ideology	Notes
Afar Democratic Union	Union démocratique afar	Democratic socialism Afar interests	Colonial-era political party
Democratic Union Issa	Union démocratique issa	Democratic socialism Issa interests	Colonial-era political party
Party of the Popular Movement	Parti du mouvement populaire	Democratic socialism	Colonial-era political party
Republican Union	Union républicaine	African nationalism Somali nationalism	Colonial-era political party
