= Central Bank of Djibouti =

Monetary Authority of Djibouti

Coordinates: 11°35′46″N 43°8′44″E

Central Bank of Djibouti البنك المركزي الجيبوتي

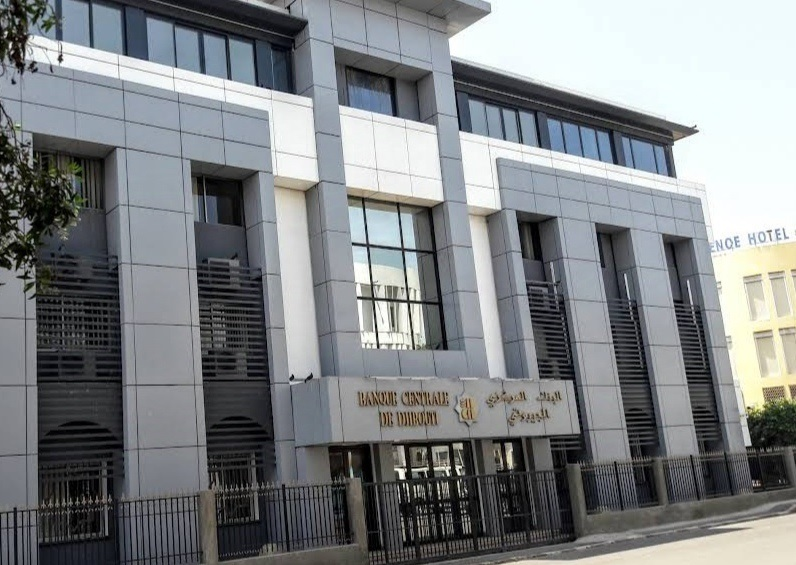
- Central bank of: Djibouti
- Headquarters: Djibouti
- Established: 18 April 1979
- Ownership: 100% state ownership
- Governor: Ahmed Osman Ali
- Currency: Djiboutian franc DJF (ISO 4217)
- Reserves: 350 million USD
- Website: Official website

The Central Bank of Djibouti (French: Banque Centrale de Djibouti) is the monetary authority of Djibouti. It is responsible for managing the country's currency, the Djiboutian franc, as well as the national foreign exchange position and accounting.

== Duties ==
Objectives of the Central Bank of Djibouti include:

- To issue and redeem notes and coins
- To supervise, regulate and inspect any financial institution which operates in and from within Djibouti
- To promote the financial stability and soundness of financial institutions
- To supervise, regulate or approve the issue of financial instruments by financial institutions or by residents
- To assist with the detection and prevention of financial crime
- To foster close relations between financial institutions themselves and between the financial institutions and the Government
- To manage exchange control and regulate transactions in foreign currency or gold on behalf of the Government
- To advise and assist the Government and public bodies on banking and other financial and monetary matters
- To perform such functions as may be necessary to fulfill the said objects.

The bank is responsible to the Djiboutian government. It was established by the decree 79030 of 18 April 1979.

== Governors ==
- Abdi Mohamed Luc Aden, 1979–1991
- Djama Mahamoud Haid, 1991–2013
- Ahmed Osman Ali, 2013–present

== See also ==
- Central banks and currencies of Africa
- Djiboutian franc, the unit of currency
- Ministry of Economy and Finance (Djibouti)
- Economy of Djibouti
- List of central banks
