= Ministry of Youth and Culture =

The Ministry of Youth and Culture is a governmental body of Djibouti currently headed by H.E. Dr. Hibo Moumin Assoweh. The body is focused on promoting and improving youth entrepreneurship and cultural development in Djibouti.

== List of ministers ==
- Abdillahi Mohamed Barkat (1999)
- Dini Abdallah Bililis (1999–2001)
- Akban Goita Moussa (2002–2005)
- Badoul Hassan Badoul (2006–2009)
- Hasna Barkat Daoud (2010–2016)
- Hibo Moumin Assoweh (2021–present)
