= Mohamed Dini Farah =

Djiboutian politician

Mohamed Dini Farah (Somali: Maxamed Diini Faarax) (born 1943) is a Djiboutian politician. He is a former minister and President of the Parliamentary Group of the People's Rally for Progress (RPP), currently serving as a deputy in the National Assembly of Djibouti.

Farah was born in Tadjourah. He was Minister of the Civil Service and Administrative Reform from 8 June 1995 to 19 April 1997, then Minister of Public Works. Farah was elected to the National Assembly in the December 1997 parliamentary election as the second candidate on the joint candidate list of the RPP and the Front for the Restoration of Unity and Democracy (FRUD) in Tadjourah Region. Following this election, he was appointed as Minister of Justice, in charge of Human Rights, on 28 December 1997.

Farah was subsequently appointed as Minister of Health on 12 May 1999. He was re-elected in the January 2003 parliamentary election as the second candidate on the candidate list of the governing coalition, the Union for a Presidential Majority (UMP), in Tadjourah Region. In the National Assembly, he became the President of the RPP Parliamentary Group.

In addition to serving on the RPP Central Committee, Farah was elected to the RPP Executive Committee as the party's National Secretary for Youth on 3 July 2003. He is also Honorary President of the RPP National Youth League as of 2003.

In the February 2008 parliamentary election, Farah was the 13th candidate on the candidate list of the governing coalition, the Union for a Presidential Majority (UMP), in the District of Djibouti. He was re-elected to a seat, and after the election, he was appointed as President of the National Defense and Security Commission in the National Assembly on 25 February 2008.
