= Ministry of Economy and Finance (Djibouti) =

Government ministry

Ministry of Economy and Finance of Djibouti
- Ministère de l'Economie et des Finances
- Emblem of Djibouti

Agency overview
- Jurisdiction: Government of Djibouti
- Headquarters: Cité Ministérielle, Djibouti City, Djibouti
- Agency executive: Ilyas Moussa Dawaleh, Minister of Economy, Finance and Planning
- Website: https://economie.gouv.dj/

The Ministry of Economy and Finance of Djibouti is the governmental body in charge of the public finances and economy of Djibouti.

== Ministers responsible for finance and economy ==
Name	Took office	Left office	Notes
Ibrahim Mohamed Sultan	1976	1986	
Mohamed Djama Elabeh	1986	1990	
Moussa Bouraleh Robleh	1990	1993	
Ahmed Aden Youssouf	1993	1995	
Mohamed Ali Mohamed	1995	1997	
Yacin Elmi Bouh	1997	2005	
Ali Farah Assoweh	May 2005	May 2011	
Ilyas Moussa Dawaleh	May 2011	Incumbent	

== See also ==
- Ministries of Djibouti
- Economy of Djibouti
- Central Bank of Djibouti
