= Mohamed Farah (disambiguation) =

Mo Farah is a British distance runner.

Mohamed Farah may also refer to:

- Mohamed Farrah Aidid (1934–1996), Somali military commander
- Mohamed Farah (footballer) (1961–2020), Somali footballer
- Mohamed Dini Farah (born 1943), Djiboutian politician
