= Social Democratic People's Party =

The Social Democratic People's Party may refer to:

- Social Democratic People's Party (Djibouti)
- Social Democratic People's Party (Turkey)
