= Moumina Houmed Hassan =

Djiboutian politician and minister

Minister for Women and Family
- In office May 2016 – 24 May 2021
- Preceded by: Hasna Barkat Daoud
- Succeeded by: Mouna Osman Aden

Moumina Houmed Hassan is a Djiboutian politician who served as the country's Minister for Women and the Family between 2016 and 2021. Hassan was appointed to this role in Prime Minister Abdoulkader Kamil Mohamed's cabinet in a reshuffle in May 2016. She replaced Hasna Barkat Daoud.

== Female Genital Mutilation ==
As a Minister, Hassan has developed, in conjunction with UNICEF and UNFPA, a new strategy for 2018-2022 to combat female genital mutilation. Despite legislation against the practice, in 2012, 80% of Djiboutian women aged 15–49 were affected, though there is a downward trend. Hassan states that legislation alone will not stop FGM. The strategy calls for increased awareness and education by mobilizing communities, traditional leaders, artists, media, with the backing of technical and financial partners. Hassan has advocated for development of specific strategies to deal with HIV/AIDS prevalence among women in countries like Djibouti, keeping in mind local social and cultural norms.

== Early career ==
Prior to joining the Cabinet, Hassan was Executive Secretary of the Secretariat for Reform of Public Administration. The focus during Hassan's tenure was on modernization of legal texts governing administrative action, development of human resource manuals to be used in government ministries and the implementation of citizen service declaration.
