= Ministry of Energy and Water (Djibouti) =

The Ministry of Energy and Water (now Ministry of Energy and Natural Resources) is a governmental organization of Djibouti that is aimed towards the control of the energy supply, electricity, water, climate of the country. The current minister is Yonis Guedi.

== List of Ministers ==
- Ali Abdi Farah (1995)
- Moussa Bouh Odowa
- Fouad Ahmed Aye
- Ali Yacoub Mahamoud (2014 - 2015)
- Dr Yacin Houssein Bouh (2016 - 2017))
- Yonis Ali Guedi (2017 - current)

== See also ==
- Ministries of Djibouti
