= Mouna Osman Aden =

Djiboutian politician

Minister of Women and Family
- Incumbent
- Assumed office 24 May 2021
- President: Ismaïl Omar Guelleh
- Preceded by: Moumina Houmed Hassan

Mouna Osman Aden is a Djiboutian politician, Minister of Women and Family of Djibouti since 2021. She previously served as Minister of Social Affairs and Solidarity between 2019 and 2021. She has previously coordinated government programmes against malaria and tuberculosis and has been a technical advisor to the Minister of Health on HIV, malaria and tuberculosis.

== Early career ==
Aden began working at the Ministry of Health in 2000 as coordinator of the National Malaria Control Programme and, from 2005, of the Expanded Immunisation Programme for one year until 2006, when she was appointed director of the Anti-Tuberculosis Centre until 2009.

For five years thereafter, Aden served as executive secretary of the Ministry of Health's Intersectoral Committee for the Fight against HIV/AIDS, malaria and tuberculosis and as technical advisor to the Minister of Health on those illnesses. Aden subsequently worked at the Ministry of Social Affairs, where she developed the national Vision 2035 strategy.

She first joined President Guelleh's government in 2016 when she was appointed Secretary of State for Social Affairs. She implemented programmes to combat poverty, the free health coverage programme (PASS), programmes to provide access to basic social services, and the 2018-2022 national social protection strategy, whose objectives were aligned with the United Nations' Sustainable Development Goals. This strategy involved legislative reform to organise the social and solidarity economy, the implementation of assistance programmes for poor households, and easier access to microfinance and improvements for disabled and elderly groups.

== Political career ==
In a cabinet reshuffle, Aden was named Minister of Social Affairs and Solidarity on 5 May 2019, a newly created Ministry.

During her term in office, Aden spearheaded a new social protection strategy, established as a fundamental right in the country, the fight against the COVID-19 pandemic, and created the first national social registry to identify and support beneficiaries of social programmes. She also coordinated the National Social Action Week and expanded social assistance programmes, especially in rural areas.

She was named Minister of Women and Family on 24 May 2021 and was sworn in the following day. She has coordinated efforts to combat female genital mutilation.

In April 2025 she signed the African Union Convention on the Elimination of Violence against Women and Girls.
