= Union of Reform Partisans =

Political party in Djibouti

Union of Reform Partisans French: Union des Partisans de la Réforme Arabic: اتحاد الإصلاح المحاربون
- Leader: Ibrahim Chehem Daoud
- Founded: 1992
- Split from: Front for the Restoration of Unity and Democracy
- Ideology: Social democracy
- Political position: Centre-left
- National affiliation: Union for the Presidential Majority
- National Assembly: 0 / 65

The Union of Reform Partisans (French: Union des Partisans de la Réforme, Arabic: اتحاد الإصلاح المحاربون) is a political party in Djibouti. It was formed in 2005 as an offshoot of the Front for the Restoration of Unity and Democracy (FRUD). Ibrahim Chehem Daoud is the President of the UPR.

The UPR participated in Djibouti's first regional and communal elections held on 10 and 31 March 2006, winning seats in the regions of Obock and Tadjourah.

In the February 2008 parliamentary election, the UPR was part of the governing Union for the Presidential Majority (Union pour la Majorité Présidentielle, UMP) coalition.

At the opening of an extraordinary congress of the ruling RPP on 4 March 2009, UPR President Ibrahim Chehem Daoud called for a constitutional amendment that would allow President Ismaïl Omar Guelleh to run for a third term in 2011.

== Electoral history ==
=== National Assembly elections ===
Election	Party leader	Votes	%	Seats	+/–	Position	Result
2008	Ibrahim Chehem Daoud	103,463 as part of the UMP	94.06%	65 / 65	Steady	1st	UMP coalition government
2013	Ibrahim Chehem Daoud	74,016 as part of the UMP	61.5%	55 / 65	▼10	1st	UMP coalition government
2018	Ibrahim Chehem Daoud	105,278 as part of the UMP	87.83%	57 / 65	▲2	1st	UMP coalition government
2023	Ibrahim Chehem Daoud	159,658 as part of the UMP	93.68%	58 / 65	▲1	1st	UMP coalition government
