= Djiboutian franc =

Currency of Djibouti

Franc djiboutien (French); الفرنك الجيبوتي (Arabic); Faranka Jabuuti (Somali); Gabuuti faranki (Afar)
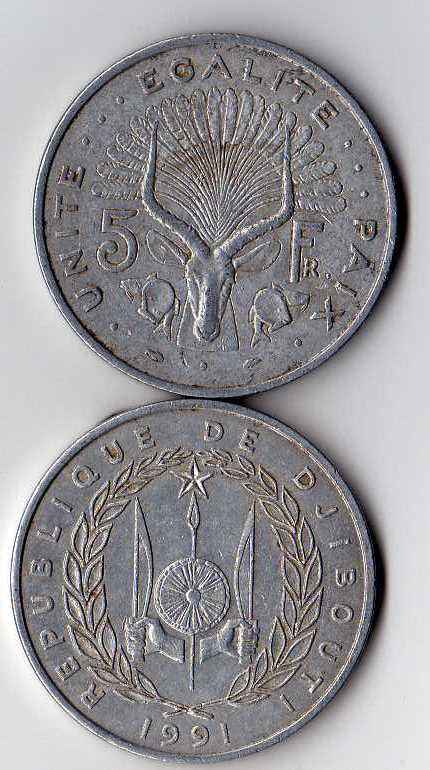
- 5 Djiboutian francs, minted in 1991.

ISO 4217
- Code: DJF (numeric: 262)

Unit
- Symbol: Fdj

Denominations
- Subunit
- 1/100: centime
- Banknotes: 40 (commemorative), 1000, 2000, 5000, 10,000 Fdj
- Coins: 1, 2, 5, 10, 20, 50, 100, 250, 500 Fdj

Demographics
- User(s): Djibouti

Issuance
- Central bank: Central Bank of Djibouti
- Website: www.banque-centrale.dj
- Printer: Polish Security Printing Works
- Website: Polska Wytwórnia Papierów Wartościowych

Valuation
- Inflation: 2.1% (2015 est.)
- Source: The World Factbook, 2013 est.
- Pegged with: U.S. dollar = 177.721 francs

The Djiboutian franc (Arabic: فرنك, French: Franc, Somali: Faranka, Afar: Faranki) is the currency of Djibouti. Its ISO 4217 currency code is DJF. Historically, it was subdivided into 100 centimes.

== History ==
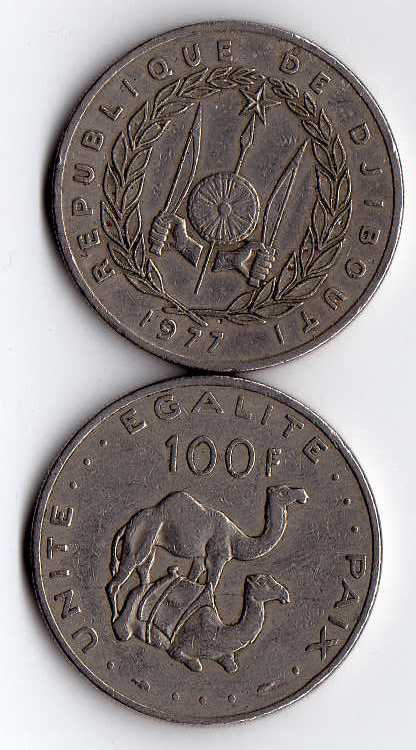
100 Djiboutian francs (1977).

From 1884, when the French Somaliland protectorate was established, the French franc circulated alongside the Indian rupee and the Maria Theresa thaler. These coexisted with 2 francs = 1 rupee and 4.2 francs = 1 Maria Theresa thaler.

From 1908, francs circulating in Djibouti were legally fixed at the value of the French franc. Starting in 1910, banknotes were issued for the then colony by the Bank of Indochina. Chamber of Commerce paper money and tokens were issued between 1919 and 1922.

In 1948, the first coins were issued specifically for use in Djibouti, in the name of the "Côte Française des Somalis". In 1949, an independent Djiboutian franc came into being when the local currency was pegged to the US dollar at a rate of 214.392 francs = 1 dollar. This was the value which the French franc had under the Bretton Woods system until a few months before. Consequently, Djiboutian currency appreciated relative to the French franc, and the Djiboutian economy was not affected by the further devaluations of the French franc.

In 1952, the Public Treasury took over the production of paper money. French Somaliland's change of name in 1967 to the French Territory of the Afars and the Issas was reflected on both the territory's coins and notes. In 1971 and 1973, the franc was revalued against the US dollar, first to a rate of 197.466 to the dollar, then 177.721, a rate which has been maintained ever since. A further change in coin and banknote design followed independence in 1977.

== Coins ==
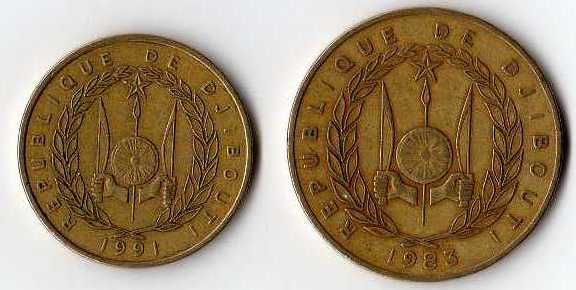
10 and 20 Djiboutian francs, reverse (c. 1991 and 1983).

Between 1920 and 1922, the Chamber of Commerce issued tokens struck in zinc, aluminium, bronze and aluminium-bronze in denominations of 5, 10, 25 and 50 centimes and 1 franc. Shapes included round, hexagonal and octagonal.

In 1948, aluminium 1, 2 and 5 francs were introduced. Aluminium-bronze 20 francs were introduced in 1952, followed by 10 francs in 1965. Cupro-nickel 50 and 100 francs were introduced in 1970, with aluminium-bronze 500 francs added in 1989.

From 2013, new coins of 250 francs were put in circulation to complement the other denominations.

Coins of the Djiboutian franc (1977–present)
Image		Value	Technical parameters				Description			Dates	
Obverse	Reverse	Value	Diameter	Thickness	Mass	Composition	Edge	Obverse	Reverse	Year of minting	Year of issue
		1 franc	23 mm	1.4 mm	1.3 g	Aluminum	Smooth	Coat of arms of Djibouti	Head of waterbuck	1977, 1996, 1997, 1999	1977
		2 francs	27.1 mm	1.4 mm	2.2 g	Aluminum	Smooth	Coat of arms of Djibouti	Head of waterbuck	1977, 1991, 1996, 1997, 1999	1977
		5 francs	31.1 mm	2.3 mm	3.75 g	Aluminum	Smooth	Coat of arms of Djibouti	Head of waterbuck	1977, 1986, 1989, 1991, 1996, 1997, 1999	1977
		10 francs	20 mm	1.3 mm	3 g	Aluminium-bronze	Smooth	Coat of arms of Djibouti	Djibouti harbour	1977, 1983, 1989, 1991, 1996, 1997, 1999, 2004, 2007, 2010, 2013, 2016, 2017	1977
		20 francs	23.5 mm	1.45 mm	4	Aluminium-bronze	Smooth	Coat of arms of Djibouti	Djibouti harbour	1977, 1982, 1983, 1986, 1991, 1996, 1997, 1999, 2007, 2010, 2016, 2017	1977
		50 francs	25.5 mm	2.1 mm	6.9 g	Copper-nickel	Milled	Coat of arms of Djibouti	Two dromedaries	1977, 1982, 1983, 1986, 1989, 1991, 1997, 1999, 2007, 2010, 2016, 2017	1977
		100 francs	30 mm	2.3 mm	12 g	Copper-nickel	Milled	Coat of arms of Djibouti	Two dromedaries	1977, 1983, 1991, 1996, 1997, 1999, 2004, 2007, 2010, 2013, 2017, 2025	1977
		250 francs	29 mm	2.1 mm	10g	Bimetallic: copper-nickel centre in brass ring	Milled	Coat of arms of Djibouti	Djibouti francolin	2012	2012
		500 francs	28 mm	3 mm	12.9 g	Aluminium-bronze	Smooth	Coat of arms of Djibouti	Laurel wreath	1989, 1991, 1997, 1999, 2010, 2025	1989
These images are to scale at 2.5 pixels per millimetre. For table standards, see the coin specification table.											

== Banknotes ==
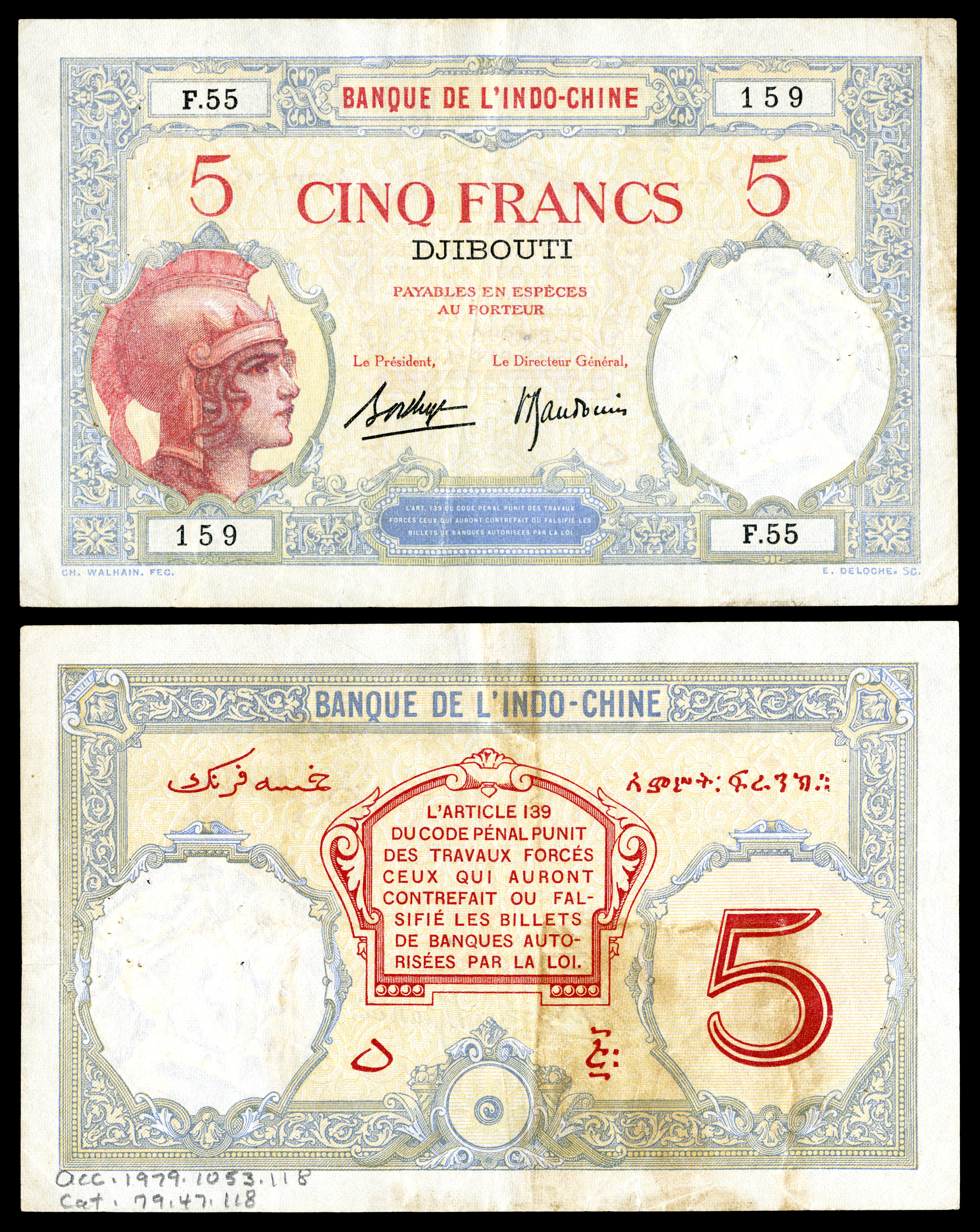
Banque de l'Indochine, 5 French Somaliland Francs (1943).

Between 1910 and 1915, banknotes were introduced in denominations of 5, 20 and 100 francs. Chamber of Commerce notes were introduced in 1919 in denominations of 5, 10 and 50 centimes and 1 franc. The decline in the value of the French franc following World War I caused 500 and 1000 franc banknotes to be introduced in 1927 and 1938, respectively. 10 franc notes were introduced in 1946.

When the Public Treasury took over the production of paper money in 1952, the 5, 10 and 20 franc notes ceased production and 5000 franc notes were introduced. In 1970, the 50 and 100 franc notes were replaced by coins. In 1977, the National Bank of Djibouti took over production of banknotes. The only subsequent changes have been the introduction of 10,000 franc notes in 1984 and the replacement of the 500 franc note with a coin in 1989.

Banknotes of the Djiboutian franc (1979–1988)
Image		Value	Main Colour	Dimensions	Description			Date of issue	
Obverse	Reverse	Value	Main Colour	Dimensions	Obverse	Reverse	Watermark	Year of printing	Year of issue
		500 francs	Multiple colors	140 × 75 mm	Man at left, rocks in sea, storks at right	Stern of ship at right	Coat of arms of Djibouti	1979, 1988	1979
		1000 francs	Red	152 × 81 mm	Woman at left, people by diesel passenger trains at center	Trader with camels at center	Coat of arms of Djibouti	1979, 2005	1979
		5000 francs	Multiple colors	162 × 87 mm	Man at right, forest scene at center	Aerial view	Coat of arms of Djibouti	1979	1979
		10,000 francs	Brown and red	170 × 90 mm	Woman holding baby	Fish and harbor scene	Coat of arms of Djibouti	1984	1984
Banknotes of the Djiboutian franc (1997–2009)
Image		Value	Main Colour	Dimensions	Description			Date of issue	
Obverse	Reverse	Value	Main Colour	Dimensions	Obverse	Reverse	Watermark	Year of printing	Year of issue
		1000 francs	Red	155 × 70 mm	Ali Ahmed Oudoum	Port of Djibouti	Coat of arms of Djibouti	2005	2005
		2000 francs	Blue	160 × 80 mm	Young girl and camel caravan	Statue with shield and government building	Coat of arms of Djibouti	1997, 2008	1997
		5000 francs	Violet	168 × 80 mm	Mahmoud Harbi	Dancers	Coat of arms of Djibouti	2002	2002
		10,000 francs	Green	175 × 81 mm	President Hassan Gouled Aptidon	Central Bank building	Coat of arms of Djibouti	1999, 2009	1999
Banknotes of the Djiboutian franc (2017)
Image		Value	Main Colour	Dimensions	Description			Date of issue	
Obverse	Reverse	Value	Main Colour	Dimensions	Obverse	Reverse	Watermark	Year of printing	Year of issue
		40 francs	Multicolored	153 × 70 mm	Whale shark, corals	Port of Djibouti	Coat of arms of Djibouti	2017	2017
These images are to scale at 0.7 pixel per millimetre (18 pixel per inch). For table standards, see the banknote specification table.

== Exchange rate ==
Current exchange rates
From Google Finance:	AUD CAD CHF CNY EUR GBP HKD JPY USD
From Yahoo! Finance:	AUD CAD CHF CNY EUR GBP HKD JPY USD
From XE.com:	AUD CAD CHF CNY EUR GBP HKD JPY USD
From OANDA:	AUD CAD CHF CNY EUR GBP HKD JPY USD

Note: Rates obtained from these websites may contradict with pegged rate mentioned above

== See also ==
- CFA franc
- Comorian franc
- Congolese franc
- Swiss franc
- Economy of Djibouti
