= Mariam Ibrahim Farah =

Djiboutian politician

Member of the National Assembly
- In office 2003–
- Constituency: Dikhil Region

Mariam Ibrahim Farah is a Djiboutian politician. In 2003 she was elected to the National Assembly as one of the first group of women to enter the legislature.

== Career ==
Prior to the 2003 elections, a new electoral law was passed, requiring party lists to consist of at least 10% of each gender. Farah was elected in Dikhil Region as a representative of the Union for the Presidential Majority, one of seven successful female candidates who became the first women in the National Assembly.
