= Ismahan Abdi Douksieh =

Djiboutian politician

Member of the National Assembly
- In office 2003–
- Constituency: Djibouti Region

Ismahan Abdi Douksieh is a Djiboutian politician. In 2003 she was elected to the National Assembly as one of the first group of women to enter the legislature.

== Career ==
Prior to the 2003 elections, a new electoral law was passed, requiring party lists to consist of at least 10% of each gender. Douksieh was elected in Djibouti Region as a representative of the Union for the Presidential Majority, one of seven successful female candidates who became the first women in the National Assembly.
