= Kadidja Mohamed Ali =

Djiboutian politician

Member of the National Assembly
- In office 2003–
- Constituency: Djibouti Region

Kadidja Mohamed Ali is a Djiboutian politician. In 2003, she was elected to the National Assembly as one of the first women to enter the legislature.

== Career ==
Prior to the 2003 elections, a new electoral law was passed that required at least 10% of party lists to consist of each gender. Ali was elected in Djibouti Region as a representative of the Union for the Presidential Majority. She was one of the seven successful female candidates who became the first women in the National Assembly.
