= Hasna Sal =

American glass sculptor

- Born: Mumbai, Maharashtra, India
- Education: London School of Journalism; Wentworth Institute of Technology; Harvard University
- Occupations: Public Artist, Architect, Lecturer, Author
- Children: Aaram Zack Salam

Hasna Sal is an American Public Artist Architect known for designing and sculpting large-scale installations and wearable sculpture.

== Education and Career ==
Sal received a diploma with distinction in journalism from the London School of Journalism before studying architecture at the Wentworth Institute of Technology in Boston, Massachusetts. She graduated with a NAAB accredited B. Arch degree magna cum laude in 2002. She then moved to Kansas to pursue a career in architecture. From 2006 to 2009, she also taught design at the University of Kansas to architectural engineering students in Lawrence KS as an Adjunct Professor. She pursued master's in landscape architecture at Harvard University in 2011 but left before receiving a degree. Sal created her firm Glass Concepts 360 and began her professional career as public art architect specializing in glass. Sal has earned name for herself amongst American women glass artists with her work. Sal went on to graduate with a master's degree in design studies at Harvard University in 2025. She was also a faculty at the College of Arts and Sciences, Harvard as a Teaching Fellow. Sal is a Lecturer at the School of Architecture at the University of Miami and has been reappointed as Associate with Harvard LSAI until June 30, 2027. Sal is also on the board of directors for a non-profit organisation based in Boston called HEAL Trafficking.

== Public Art Career ==
In 2015, Sal started her own glass sculpture and jewelry company, Glass Concepts 360, in Olathe. Her sculptures include sculptural sinks, window panels, wall sculptures, coffee tables, light fixtures, tableware and jewelry, with "Art in Living" being the theme of her work. She created a 600-pound nativity triptych, measuring 7 feet 9 inches tall, 8 feet 6 inches wide and 2 feet deep, which was freestanding and lit with LED. The nativity scene was installed at St. Catherine of Siena Parish in Kansas City. In March 2019, the Nativity Triptych was relocated to Savior Pastoral Center in Kansas City, KS.

In September 2018, Sal showcased her handmade jewelry at the New York Fashion Week in collaboration with Indian fashion designer Archana Kochhar. Sal was invited to return at the February 2019 New York Fashion Week for a solo show.

In September 2019, Sal showcased her handmade glass accessories at the New York Fashion Week at Sony Hall, NYC in collaboration with Australian fashion designer Daniel Alexander. Sal was invited to return to the February 2020 New York Fashion Week for a solo show.

In September 2019, Sal's glass sculptures were displayed as part of the Globe Indian Cuisine Restaurant, an Indian restaurant in Topeka, owned by Sunil Gotru.

In July 2020, Sal showcased thirteen wall sculptures in glass, with the pieces on display at St. Michael the Archangel Church in Leawood, Kansas. The theme of the exhibit was “human trafficking.”

In October 2020, Sal completed a permanent exterior public art installation at Lykins Square Park in Kansas City MO, memorializing victims of human trafficking. These panels are in glass encased by metal frame. The title is "Into The Light". The installation consists of four panels which are 2 feet in width and 4 feet in height. They are placed 14 feet off ground level. The themes of the panels are isolation, damnation, redemption and salvation.

In November 2020, Sal came on board the Public Art Master Plan Core Team for Johnson County Parks and Recreation Department.

In February 2021, Sal showcased a solo online exhibition of her sculptures hosted by RG Endres Gallery, an extension of the City Hall of the city of Prairie Village in Kansas. The online exhibition is expected to continue through the month of March.

In September 2021, Sal won the new Kansas City International Airport concourse wall installation project. Sal completed the installation in Fall 2022. Watch NowWatch Now

In October 2021, Sal received selection in an international open-call competition to present at the Larnaca Biennale in Larnaca, Cyprus. The Biennale is to showcase from 13 October to 26 November 2021.

In November 2021, Sal published her book titled Poems of Glass.

In November 2021, Sal won Neighborhood Stabilization Merit Award by Historic Kansas City for her memorial installation titled "Into the Light".|

In November 2021, Sal exhibited her Glass artwork and poetry installation titled "Into the Light" at the Westport Presbyterian Church.

In January 2022, Sal exhibited her Glass artwork and poetry installation titled "Into the Light" at the Kansas City Museum.

In February 2022, Benedictine College hosted Sal's artwork installation - "Into the Light" as part of their Social Justice Week.

In June 2022, Sal received gallery representation with Eva Reynolds Gallery.

In July 2022, Sal founded the Hasna Sal Public Art Foundation with the aim to support her mission of melding public art, storytelling, and social activism, particularly through creative placemaking that raises awareness on critical issues like human trafficking, domestic abuse, and community resilience.

In July 2022, Sal was prominently featured in a leading newspaper in Kerala for her work with glass.

In August 2022, Sal was one of the 150 artists selected from 40 nations to feature at the international competition by Biennale Chianciano in Italy.

In September 2022, Sal's installation "Helping Hand" found a permanent place at the YWCA in St Joseph.

In October 2022, Sal's permanent exterior public art installation ‘Live in Light ‘, comprising 03 painted and lighted glass panels on steel posts were installed at Independence Plaza Park, Kansas City MO.

In November 2022, Sal's two prominent artwork installations - Lykins Park and Camaraderie which address the issue of human trafficking became part of the Kansas City Museum’s permanent collection.

In December 2022, Sal was chosen to showcase her work at the 41st Annual Smithsonian Craft Show to be held in May, 2023.

In March 2024, Sal secured a place in the Girl Power international group show by HMVC Gallery New York. The Exhibit is set to be showcased from March 1st to March 31st, 2024. Sal’s glass painting titled ‘ Eternal’ has been selected by HMVC Gallery New York for its upcoming show titled ‘Girl Power’.

In March 2024, Sal’s glass painting titled Motherhood was displayed on the billboard of Times Square, New York City as part of the winning entries of a national competition by HMVC Gallery New York.

In June 2025, Sal published her book titled Vembanad Lake and Its Untold Stories.

In October 2025, Sal's nativity installation was permanently installed in Independence Boulevard Christian Church in Kansas City, Missouri.

In November 2025, Sal presented Vembanad Lake and Its Untold Stories at Tropical Biosummit 2025, Kochi, Kerala.

In January 2026, Sal's installation "Glass Maples" was accepted into the ‘Sculpture in the Landscape Exhibition 2026‘ at the Himalayan Garden & Sculpture Park in North Yorkshire, England.

In May 2026, Sal's book titled Vembanad Lake and Its Untold Stories was added into Harvard University’s official library catalog - HOLLIS, with a physical copy available at the Frances Loeb Library at the Harvard Graduate School of Design.

In September 2026, Sal was chosen as a Speaker for the International Biophilia Summit.

In September 2026, Sal published research in the "International Journal of Humanities and Social Science Invention” examining the production of Kumayam as a sustainable product for building construction.
