= Hasna Hassan Ali =

Djiboutian politician

Member of the National Assembly
- In office 2003–2013
- Constituency: Tadjourah Region

Hasna Hassan Ali, also known as Hasna Hassantou, is a Djiboutian politician. In 2003 she was elected to the National Assembly as one of the first group of women to enter the legislature.

== Career ==
Prior to the 2003 elections, a new electoral law was passed, requiring party lists to consist of at least 10% of each gender. Ali was elected in Tadjourah Region as a representative of the Union for the Presidential Majority, one of seven successful female candidates who became the first women in the National Assembly. She also served as president of the Association of Women of Tadjourah and of the northern branch of the Popular Savings and Credit Union.
