= Social Democratic People's Party (Djibouti) =

Political party in Djibouti

Social Democratic People's Party French: Parti Populaire Social Démocrate Arabic: حزب الشعب الديمقراطي الاجتماعي
- Leader: Hasna Moumin Bahdon
- Founded: 2002
- Ideology: Social democracy
- Political position: Centre-left
- National affiliation: Union for the Presidential Majority

The Social Democratic People's Party (French: Parti Populaire Social Démocrate, Arabic: حزب الشعب الديمقراطي الاجتماعي) is a centre-left, social democratic political party, in Djibouti. The party was founded in 2002by Moumin Bahdon Farah, now led by his daughter Hasna Moumin Bhadon s part of the governing coalition, the Union for a Presidential Majority (UMP).

Prior to founding the PPSD, Farah was Minister of Foreign Affairs and Secretary-General of the People's Rally for Progress (RPP), the governing party. He was removed from the RPP leadership in 1996 and joined the opposition. Farah subsequently founded the PPSD in 2002; he filed a declaration for the PPSD at the Interior Ministry on 26 October 2002, and Interior Minister Abdoulkader Doualeh Waïs announced that the party was legally registered on 31 October 2002. Speaking in a television interview on 22 November 2002, Farah said that his new party was not part of the opposition, expressing support for the government and stating that the PPSD planned to ally with the RPP. The party opened its first congress on 7 December 2002. In the parliamentary election held on 10 January 2003, the PPSD was part of the Union for the Presidential Majority (Union pour la Majorité Présidentielle), which won 62.7% of the popular vote and all seats.

The PPSD held an extraordinary congress on 25 November 2004, at which Farah announced the party's support for President Ismail Omar Guelleh's candidacy in the April 2005 presidential election. The party remained part of the UMP in the February 2008 parliamentary election.

== Electoral history ==
=== National Assembly elections ===
Election	Party leader	Votes	%	Seats	+/–	Position	Result
2003	Moumin Bahdon Farah	53,293 as part of the UMP	62.7%	65 / 65	Steady	1st	UMP coalition government
2008	Moumin Bahdon Farah	103,463 as part of the UMP	94.06%	65 / 65	Steady	1st	UMP coalition government
2013	Moumin Bahdon Farah	74,016 as part of the UMP	61.5%	55 / 65	▼10	1st	UMP coalition government
2018	Moumin Bahdon Farah	105,278 as part of the UMP	87.83%	57 / 65	▲2	1st	UMP coalition government
2023	Moumin Bahdon Farah	159,658 as part of the UMP	93.68%	58 / 65	▲1	1st	UMP coalition government
