= Yacin Elmi Bouh =

Djiboutian politician

Yacin Elmi Bouh ياسين علمي بوح

Minister of Economy and Finance of Djibouti
- In office 1997–2005
- Preceded by: Mohamed Ali Mohamed
- Succeeded by: Ali Farah Assoweh

Minister of the Interior and Decentralization
- In office 22 May 2005 – ??

Personal details
- Born: 4 June 1962 (age 63) Djibouti, Djibouti

Yacin Elmi Bouh (Arabic: ياسين علمي بوح, Somali: Yaasiin Cilmi Buux) is a Djiboutian politician. He was Minister of Economy and Finance from 1997 to 2005 and has been Minister of Interior and Decentralization since 22 May 2005.

He was a candidate for the post of Vice-President of the Commission of the African Union in the election held at the summit of the organization on 30 and 31 January 2017 in Addis Ababa.

== Early life and education ==
Bouh was born in the city of Djibouti. He studied primary and secondary schools in Djibouti, culminating in a Higher Leaving Certificate Series B – Economical.

=== Education ===
He received his Baccalauréat (A level), with major in Economics at the Djibouti High School in 1982. He received Law Diploma (1983–1985) at the Law University of Nantes, BA in Public Law (1986) and MA in Public Law (1987).

=== Training ===
He developed legal texts at the Institut de l’Administration Publique in Paris between 2 January 1988 and 31 March 1988, and was planning projects and public finances at the University of Pittsburgh between 1 June and 31 August 1990.
