= Hawa Ahmed Youssouf =

Djiboutian civil servant and politician

Minister-Delegate for International Cooperation
- In office 2005–

Minister-Delegate for the Promotion of Women, Family and Social Affairs
- In office 1999–2005
- Succeeded by: Aïcha Mohamed Robleh

Member of the National Assembly
- In office 2003–
- Constituency: Djibouti Region

Personal details
- Born: 9 November 1966 (age 59) Djibouti, Djibouti
- Education: University of Reims Champagne-Ardenne

Hawa Ahmed Youssouf (Somali: Xaawa Axmed Yuusuf) (born November 9, 1966) is a Djiboutian civil servant and politician. In 1999 she was appointed Minister-Delegate for the Promotion of Women, Family and Social Affairs, the first female minister in the country. Four years later she also became one of the first group of women elected to the National Assembly.

== Career ==
Youssouf was born on November 9, 1966, in Djibouti. She gained a master's degree in international relations from the University of Reims Champagne-Ardenne, and began working in banking in 1991. In 1992 she became a technical advisor in the Ministry and in 1998 was appointed director of the new Directorate for the Promotion of Women.

In 1999 she was appointed Minister-Delegate for the Promotion of Women, Family and Social Affairs, the first woman appointed to a cabinet position. Prior to the 2003 elections, a new electoral law was passed, requiring party lists to consist of at least 10% of each gender. She was elected in Djibouti Region as a representative of the Union for the Presidential Majority, one of seven successful female candidates who became the first women in the National Assembly. In 2005 she was appointed Minister-Delegate of International Cooperation.

Youssouf is an advocate against Female Genital Mutilation (FGM). In August 2017, she presented a series of talks at a three-day visit to Norway on the subject after remarking earlier at a United Nations conference that while Article 333 of the Djiboutian Penal Code in the last seven years severely sanctioned perpetrators of female genital mutilation, "still some 90 percent of the 7 to 8-year old girls are exposed to this harmful tradition" in Djibouti.

Youssouf has also served on international committees interested in bringing an end to political destabilization in sub-Saharan Africa. In 2012, she was the African Union Special Representative to the Central African Republic, engaged in helping to "raise funding for the disarmament, demobilization and reintegration" of victims affected by the activities of the Buzizi government.
