= Union for National Salvation =

Political coalition in Djibouti

Union for National Salvation Union pour le Salut National
- President: Ahmed Youssof Houmed
- Founded: 16 January 2013
- Headquarters: Djibouti City
- National Assembly: 0 / 65

Website
- Facebook page

The Union for National Salvation (French: Union pour le Salut National USN) is a political coalition in Djibouti.

Led by Ahmed Youssof Houmed, the coalition was formed to contest the 2013 parliamentary election. The party won 21 seats in the election, although the USN cited what it referred to as cases of mass fraud and ballot tampering, and called for demonstrations.

The coalition is composed of six parties; the ARD, the UDJ, the MRD, the PND, the PDD, and MoDel.
