= Hasna Mohamed Dato =

Djiboutian politician

Member of the Pan-African Parliament
- Incumbent
- Assumed office 2004

Member of the National Assembly of Djibouti
- Incumbent
- Assumed office January 2003
- Constituency: Djibouti Region

Secretary-Rapporteur of the Legislation and General Administration Commission
- Incumbent
- Assumed office 26 January 2003

Personal details
- Born: November 10, 1959 (age 66) Obock, Djibouti
- Party: People's Rally for Progress

Hasna Mohamed Dato (born 10 November 1959) is a Djiboutian politician and a member of the Pan-African Parliament from Djibouti.

Dato was born in Obock and is a member of the People's Rally for Progress (RPP). She was elected to the National Assembly of Djibouti in the January 2003 parliamentary election as the 35th candidate on the candidate list of the Union for a Presidential Majority (UMP) coalition in Djibouti Region. Following this election, she was chosen as the Secretary-Rapporteur of the Legislation and General Administration Commission in the National Assembly on 26 January 2003.

On 10 March 2004, Dato was chosen by the National Assembly as one of Djibouti's initial five members of the Pan-African Parliament.

== See also ==
- List of members of the Pan-African Parliament
