= Ali Farah Assoweh =

Djiboutian politician

Minister of Economy and Finance of Djibouti
- In office 22 May 2005 – 12 May 2011
- Preceded by: Yacin Elmi Bouh
- Succeeded by: Ilyas Moussa Dawaleh

Personal details
- Born: 1965 (age 60–61)
- Party: People's Rally for Progress

Ali Farah Assoweh is a Djiboutian politician and member of the cabinet.

He is trained as an economist, and a member of the People's Rally for Progress. He was appointed by President Ismail Omar Guelleh as Minister of Economy and Finance, in charge of planning and privatization on 22 May 2005. He was reassigned on 12 May 2011 as Minister of Justice, in charge of human rights.
