= Djibouti and the World Bank =

Djibouti's relation with the WBG

In 1980, Djibouti became a member of the World Bank Group (WBG). The WBG includes five different organizations: the International Bank for Reconstruction and Development (IBRD), the International Development Association (IDA), the International Finance Corporation (IFC), the Multilateral Investment Guarantee Agency (MIGA) and the International Centre for Settlement of Investment Disputes (ICSID). Accounting for more than thirteen thousand projects across 173 countries, the WBG is one of the main lending facilities of the world. The WBG works together with governments and private sectors in order to enhance countries efforts towards development and poverty reduction.

== Background ==
Djibouti's location has been crucial in shaping its development. Situated in the Horn of Africa, Djibouti is one of the smallest countries in the world. It is bordered by Eritrea, Somalia and Ethiopia, the latter being completely dependent on Djibouti for its maritime exports. Overlooking the Red Sea and the Gulf of Aden, the port of Djibouti is one of the most strategic trade facilities connecting Asia, Europe and Africa.

Its geographic location, its port and the presence of military bases have contributed to Djibouti's economic growth. However, these have also shaped a model of economic growth which has become unsustainable, as stated in the most recent Country Partnership Strategy. Despite having benefited from sustained growth since 1990s, Djibouti is still affected by poverty and inequality. In fact, the 2017 estimates for poverty show that 35% of the population lives in poverty, 21% in extreme poverty and that the Gini coefficient has raised from 40% to 42% in 2017.

The discouraging data regarding poverty and inequality have prompted the country to set its development goals in Vision 2035, the government development plan aimed at strengthening governance, economic integration and human development. In addition to this, Djibouti, as of September 2018, has signed with IDA a commitment of US$150 million to carry out 11 projects.

== Country Partnership Strategy ==
The most recent developments of the relations between the World Bank Group and Djibouti are summarized by the 2014-2017 Country Partnership Strategy (CPS) which has been cooperatively signed by IDA, IFC and MIGA. The strategy stems from the need to develop an alternative to the capital driven growth model of the country. Recent economic growth has in fact been the result of intense foreign direct investments, rents from its military bases and the activities related to the port of Djibouti. The reliance on public sector activities and on capital driven growth has been indicated as an obstacle to Djibouti development.

The CPS clearly states that the two main pillars consist of reducing country's vulnerabilities and strengthening the business sector. With reference to the former, the objective is to design programs and policies that address the country's human security issues. These include very broad aspects connected to socioeconomic factors of urban and rural areas such as unemployment, health, education and access to water and power. According to the Human Development Index, Djibouti ranks as low as 172nd out of 189 countries. With reference to the second pillar, it is worth noting that recent improvements have been reported in the Doing Business 2019, a program that compares regulatory frameworks for medium and small sized business across 190 nations. Djibouti has in fact ameliorated its position, jumping from 154th to 99th in the Ease of Doing Business ranking.

The inherent risks to the implementation of the strategy lie on the very nature of Djibouti's institutional system and its geographical location. First of all, Djibouti is exposed to natural disasters such as floods, earthquakes and tsunamis. Secondly, despite its recent internal stabilities, the country is suffering from ongoing conflicts in adjacent countries. Djibouti has seen a considerable number of refugees and asylum seekers fleeing to the country from Eritrea, Ethiopia, Somalia and Yemen. As of March 2018, the number of refugees and asylum-seekers amounts to 27 000 people. Moreover, the implementation of such strategy also depends on the political leadership and its willingness to commit to the programs. Lastly, social tensions continue to grow as the unemployment rate grows higher, especially among the young population.

The resources that have been allocated include an indicative envelope of US$25 million under IDA. In addition to this, the World Bank also uses trust funds activities to support its projects.

== Performance and Learning Review of CPS FY2014-2017 ==
The progress of the development strategy suggested by the World Bank is traced in the Performance and Learning Review (PLR) of 2016, issued by IDA, IFC and MIGA in May 2016. The PLR assessed that there have been comparatively more improvements with respect to the first pillar - reducing vulnerabilities - rather that the second pillar- strengthening the business environment. The country has participated to programs regarding social protection, rural development, urban poverty reduction and health sector performance.

== Projects ==
Over the course of the years, Djibouti has implemented 57 projects, 38 of them are closed and 19 are still active

The active projects are listed on the table below.

Project Title	Amount ( US$ millions)	Approval Date
Integrated Slum Upgrading Project	20.0	November 9, 2018
Towards Zero Stunting in Djibouti	15.0	July 9, 2018
Djibouti Support For Women and Youth Entrepreneurship	15.0	June 8, 2018
Public Administration Modernization Project	15.0	April 25, 2018
National Strategy for Development of Statistics (NSDS) and Strengthening of National Account Production	0.42	April 6, 2018
Sustainable Electrification Program	23.3	June 2, 2017
Governance for Private Sector and Finance Development Additional Fin.	5.1	December 14, 2016
Second Additional Financing for PRODERMO	7.0	May 31, 2016
Djibouti Social Safety Net Second Additional Financing	4.0	May 31, 2016
Enhancing income opportunities in DJ	2.73	June 19, 2015
DJ Social Safety Net Project Additional Financing	5.0	October 28, 2014
Djibouti: Governance for Private Sector Development and Finance Project	2.0	June 23, 2014
Second Urban Poverty Reduction Project (PREPUD II)	5.6	May 14, 2014
DJ Geothermal Power Generation Project	6.0	June 5, 2013
DJ (GEF) Geothermal Power Generation Program	6.04	June 5, 2013
DJ Improving Health Sector Performance	7.0	April 2, 2013
DJ Crisis Response - Social Safety Net Project	5.0	June 12, 2012
DJ-Rural Community Development & Ware Mobilization - Additional Financing	3.0	June 12, 2012
DJ-Rural Community Development and Water Mobilization Project (PRODERMO)	5.83	June 14, 2011

=== Integrated Slum Upgrading Project (ISUP) ===
As recently as November 9, the World Bank has approved a US$20 million project aimed at improving social and environmental conditions in the slums of urban areas of the country. The need to improve living conditions of the capital city, Djibouti (city), and other areas, derives from a combination of country specific factors: vulnerability to climate change, rapid and uncontrolled urbanization, rising number of refugees and Internally Displaced People. The main challenges within this social context concern the provision of basic infrastructure and the access to social services such as schools, housing and jobs. The project is coherent with the Zero Slum Project (ZSP) launched by the government.
