= Ilyas Moussa Dawaleh =

Djiboutian politician

- إلياس موسى دوله
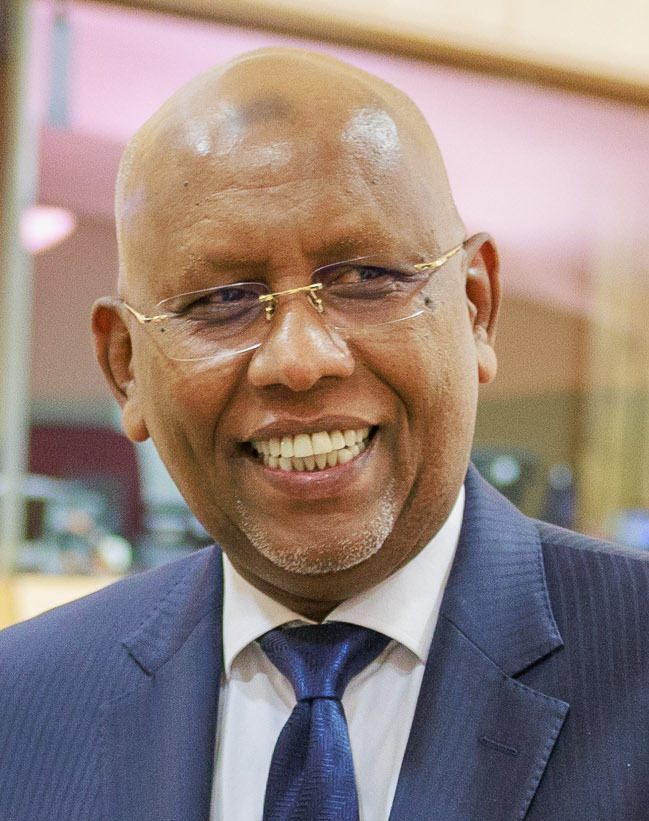
- Moussa Dawaleh in 2023

Minister of Economy and Finance of Djibouti
- Incumbent
- Assumed office 12 May 2011
- Preceded by: Ali Farah Assoweh

Personal details
- Party: People's Rally for Progress

Ilyas Moussa Dawaleh is a Djiboutian politician and since 2011 Minister of Economy, Finance, and Planning.

Moussa Dawaleh was chief operating officer of the Port of Djibouti from 1996 to 2004.

Moussa Dawaleh has been the Minister of Economy and Finance, and responsible for industry since 12 May 2011. He has also been the secretary general of the People's Rally for Progress since September 2012.
