= Djibouti and the International Monetary Fund =

Relations between the International Monetary Fund and Djibouti began in 1978, at the time of Djibouti's membership. Since that time, Djibouti has taken out three different kinds of loans or credit lines from the IMF. A Stand-By-Credit, an Enhanced Structural Adjustment Facility, and Poverty Reduction and Growth Facility plan.

== Background ==
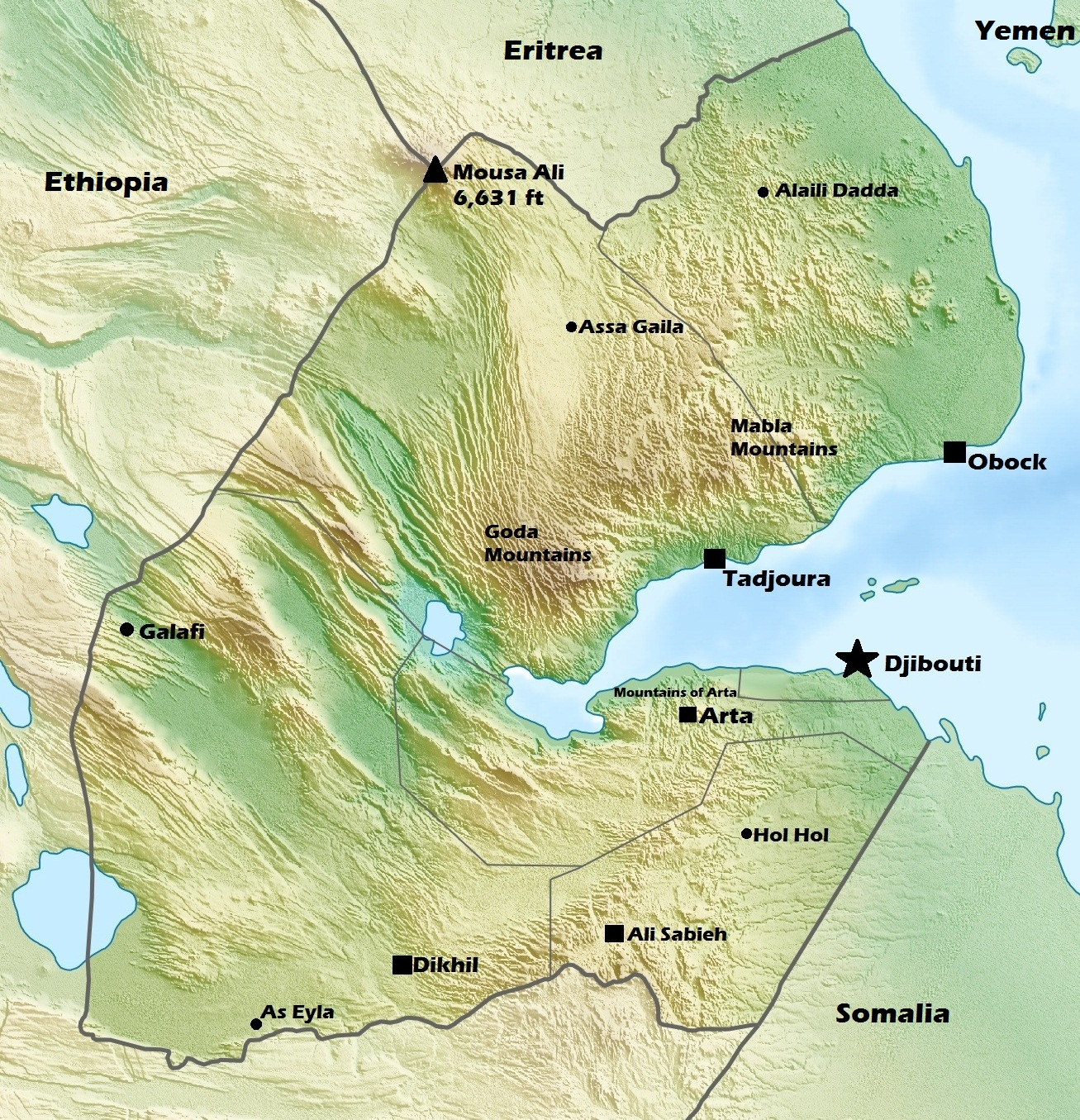
Map of Djibouti

Located strategically between Eritrea and Ethiopia, Djibouti is a main port city that is home to foreign military bases. Djibouti is also the country that blocks Ethiopia's borders from touching the Red Sea. For many years Djibouti was known as a poor African nation, however with recent mass foreign investment, as well as public infrastructure projects, and loans from the International Monetary Fund and other international banks, Djibouti is flourishing into a growing economy with intentions to become an economically strong African country. Presently, Djibouti has seen tremendous GDP growth, reaching 6.7% in 2017.

== 1996 - 2007 ==
In 1996 the IMF extended the first Stand-By-Credit to Djibouti. It was the first line of credit that Djibouti had obtained from the IMF, and its total amount was for $6.7 million US dollars for a total loan period of 14 months which was to be used to fund multiple infrastructure projects. These projects included the infrastructure for their port, the airport, electric, water, and telecommunications throughout the nation.

Even in 1996, when the first loan was received by the IMF, an evaluation had been done and it was determined that there was a need to secure funding for health and education. There was also a study that was to be conducted the decipher the lengths to which poverty entrenched the economy and the impact it had on the nation.

The deal that Djibouti and the IMF made with each other was that the IMF would help with providing them a line of credit in order to fix their economy, fund infrastructure, and help them begin in a restriction-free trade and exchange deal in order to allow them to obtain foreign currency. In exchange, in order to ensure a balance of payments, the IMF imposed the conditions of i) cutbacks to the nominal wage bill ii) reduction in defense and security personnel (which the World Bank was requested to help with), and iii) reform of the civil service system.

In 1997 and 1998 Djibouti filed for two extensions of their Stand-By-Credit loan, in order to give them more time for restructuring. In the Fall of 1999 was the first ESAF (Enhanced Structural Adjustment Facility) loan that was granted to Djibouti from the IMF. This loan was valued at $26.5 million US dollars. It was determined by the IMF that Djibouti had made significant progress from 1996 - 1998 in order to be able to grant them long term loan like the ESAF. The goal was to maintain yearly GDP growth at a steady 3%.

At the conclusion of the ESAF loan, which concluded in 2004, there was a 4-year gap until another IMF staffer was able to release another evaluation of Djibouti.

== 2008 - 2012 ==
In 2008, the IMF approved a $20 million PRGF (Poverty Reduction and Growth Facility) loan, which was to be aimed primarily at fighting poverty in the region. During the past few years it had been established that Djibouti had maintained a healthy amount of growth due to foreign investment in their port, in order to take on a new loan from the IMF. This loan would be extended until 2012.

== 2013 - Present ==
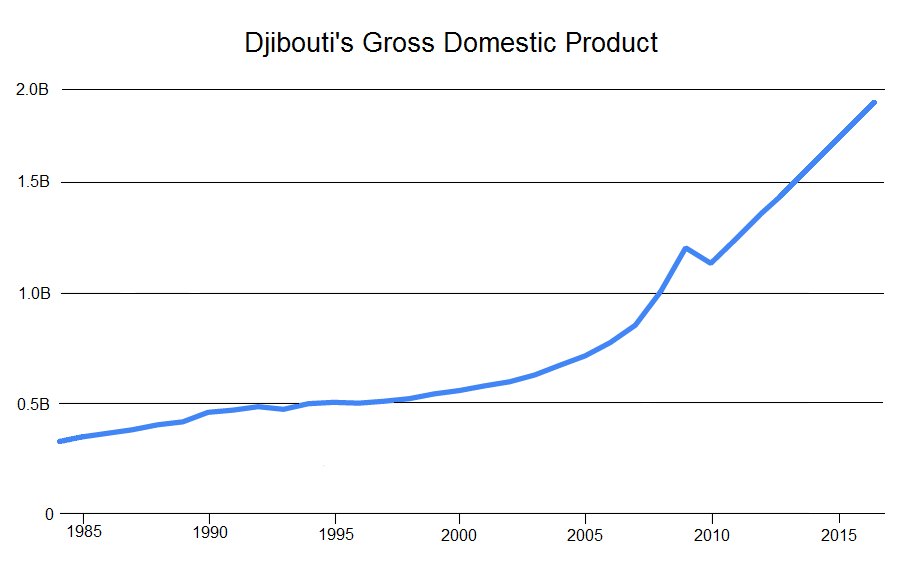
A 2015 capture of GDP growth from Djibouti

With the increase of Chinese investment, an approved Chinese military base, a massive influx of Chinese foreign investment, as well as supplementations of funds by the IMF, Djibouti has been able to maintain a steady increase in GDP growth while maintaining a low inflation rate. Funds received from China came with the understanding that Djibouti, along with many other countries, would help in the structuring and establishing of the Chinese Belt and Road Initiative in their respective countries.

The IMF continues to fund Djibouti's ventures however, it has less of a need for loans from the IMF with the constant flow of foreign investment. Presently Djibouti holds $12.03 million in outstanding payments owed.
