= Ministry of Justice & Penal Affairs (Djibouti) =

The Ministry of Justice & Penal Affairs of Djibouti is responsible for disciplining the courts, providing access and general justice, creating penitentiary policy, and handling human rights issues. In addition, the ministry develops regulations that pertain to criminal, civil and administrative matters.

== List of ministers (Post-1977 upon achieving independence) ==
- Ismael Ali Youssouf (1977–1978)
- Helaf Orbis Ali (1978–1982)
- Omar Kamil Warsama (1982–1986)
- Helaf Orbis Ali (1986–1990)
- Ougoure Hassan Ibrahim (1991–1993)
- Moumin Bahdon Farah (1993–1996)
- Hassan Farah Miguil (1996–1997)
- Mohamed Dini Farah (1998–1999)
- Ibrahim Idriss Djibril (1999–2001)
- Ismael Ibrahim Hemed (2001–2011)
- Ali Farah Assoweh (2011–2016)
- Moumin Ahmed Cheick (2016–2019)
- Ali Hassan Bahdon (2019–present)

== See also ==
- Justice ministry
- Politics of Djibouti
