= Ministry of Health of Djibouti =

The ministry of Health of Djibouti is a governmental organization that is responsible for the health related activities and affairs of the country and oversees the medical aspects of its citizens' lives. Dr. Ahmed Robleh Abdilleh is the current Minister.

== List of Ministers ==
- Ahmed Youssouf - 1977
- Mohamed Dini Farah - 1999 - 2004
- Abdallah Abdillahi Miguil - 2005 - 2009
- Dr Kassim Issak Osman - 2013
- Dr. Ahmed Robleh Abdilleh - 2021 till date

== See also ==
Ministries Of Djibouti
