= Aïcha Mohamed Robleh =

Djiboutian writer (born 1965)

Minister of Promotion of Women, Family Well-Being, and Social Affairs
- In office 2005–?
- President: Ismaïl Omar Guelleh
- Preceded by: Hawa Ahmed Youssouf
- Succeeded by: ?

Personal details
- Born: 1965 (age 60–61) Djibouti, French Somaliland (now the present-day Djibouti)

Aïcha Mohamed Robleh (Somali: Caasha Maxamed Rooble; born 1965) is a Djiboutian writer.

== Biography ==
Robleh was born in Djibouti, and holds a degree in the field of workplace relations, focusing on work-health matters. She was a departmental head in the office of the Minister for Employment until in 2003 she was elected to the National Assembly. In 2005 she became the Minister of Promotion of Women, Family Well-Being, and Social Affairs. She has written numerous plays, and is the founder of the stage company La Voix de l'Est. In 1998 UNESCO recognized her play La Dévoilée. A film which she directed based on her work, on the subject of female genital mutilation, was premiered in 2015.
