= Emblem of Djibouti =

National Emblem of Djibouti
- Armiger: Republic of Djibouti
- Adopted: 1977

The national emblem of Djibouti was introduced after attaining independence from France on 27 June 1977. It was made by Hassan Robleh. It is bordered on the sides with laurel branches. Within this perimeter there is a vertical spear, in front of which is a shield. Underneath the shield, two hands rise away from the spear, both of which carry a large machete. These two hands symbolize the two main indigenous ethnic groups that make up the Djiboutian people: the Afars and the Issas, and they have roots in Ethiopia and Somalia. The spear is topped by a red star. The star symbolizes the unity between the Issa and the Afar peoples. A Djibouti law established the seal and states its significance, and has been translated into English.

== Historical Coat of Arms ==
Coat of Arms of The Ottoman Empire from 1846 to 1882

Coat of Arms of The Ottoman Empire from 1882 to 1883

Coat of Arms of The Khedivate of Egypt from 1874 to 1884

Coat of Arms of The Russian Empire from January 14 to February 5 1889

Coat of Arms of France from 1905 to 1977

Emblem of Vichy France from 1940 to 1942

Coat of Arms of The United Kingdom from 1942 to 1943

Emblem of Free France from 1943 to 1944

== See also ==
- The similar coat of arms of Ukraine
