= 2008 Djiboutian parliamentary election =

- 8 February 2008

All 65 seats in the National Assembly 33 seats needed for a majority
- Registered: 151,490
- Turnout: 72.61% (▲24.77pp)
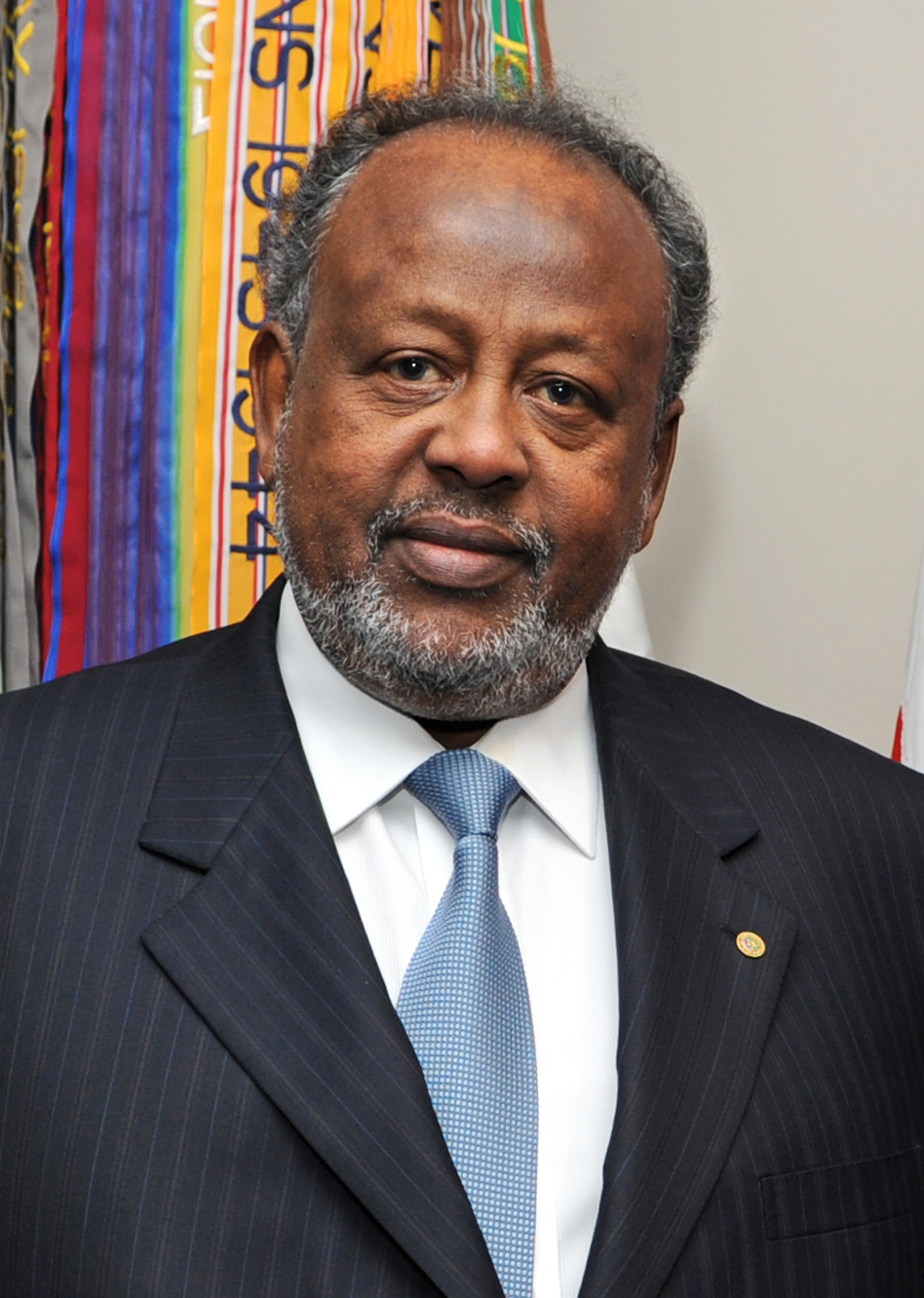
	First party
Leader	Ismaïl Omar Guelleh
Party	UMP
Seats won	65
Seat change	Steady
Popular vote	103,463
Percentage	100%
Swing	▲31.36pp
- Results by region
President of the National Assembly before election
Idriss Arnaoud Ali
RPP
Elected President of the National Assembly
Idriss Arnaoud Ali
RPP

Parliamentary elections were held in Djibouti on 8 February 2008. There were 65 candidates running for the 65 seats in the National Assembly, with all of the candidates coming from the ruling coalition, the Union for the Presidential Majority (UMP). The opposition boycotted the election, and the UMP won all 65 seats.

In boycotting the election, the opposition complained that the electoral system guaranteed victory for the UMP; in the previous parliamentary elections in 2003, the UMP won all 65 seats despite the opposition receiving 38% of the vote. The opposition unsuccessfully demanded that proportional representation be introduced. Ismael Guedi Hared, a leader of the opposition Union for a Democratic Alternative, said that the country effectively had a one-party system, that "none of the democratic rules [were] respected", and that the government was unwilling to accept proportional representation because it was fearful of discontent.

== Background ==
In a decree on 26 December 2007, President Ismail Omar Guelleh set the election date for 8 February 2008. Subsequently, in a presidential decree on 6 January 2008, campaigning was scheduled to begin at midnight on 25 January and run until midnight on 6 February.

The newly formed Arta Region was represented as a separate constituency for the first time in the 2008 election. Three seats were at stake there.

== Campaign ==
The UMP filed its list of candidates at the Interior Ministry on 10 January 2003. More than a third of its candidates were new, and nine of its candidates (14% of the total) were women. In addition to the main governing party, the People's Rally for Progress (RPP), the UMP coalition included the National Democratic Party (PND), the moderate faction of the Front for the Restoration of Unity and Democracy (FRUD), the People's Social Democratic Party (PSD), and the Union of Reform Partisans (UPR). Prime Minister Dileita Mohamed Dileita headed the UMP list. According to Dileita, the government's refusal to introduce proportional representation was due to the need to preserve "the tribal balance", pointing to chaotic conditions of neighboring Somalia as an example to avoid. He did, however, say that it might be necessary to consider introducing proportional representation at some future time.

== Conduct ==
The African Union and the Arab League observed the election and gave it a positive assessment. The Constitutional Council validated the results on 17 February, and the National Assembly met for the first session of its new term on 20 February, re-electing Idriss Arnaoud Ali as President of the National Assembly.

== Results ==
Yacin Elmi Bouh, the Minister of the Interior, announced on 9 February that the UMP had won all 65 seats and placed turnout at 72.61%, which he said was the highest in 15 years. Out of 151,490 registered voters, 109,999 were said to have voted, with 103,463 votes in favor of the UMP and 6,536 null votes. However, the number of people registering to vote had been low.

Party	Votes	%	Seats	+/–
Union for the Presidential Majority	103,463	100.00	65	0
Total	103,463	100.00	65	0
Valid votes	103,463	94.06		
Invalid/blank votes	6,536	5.94		
Total votes	109,999	100.00		
Registered voters/turnout	151,490	72.61		
Source: African Elections Database
