= Republican Alliance for Democracy =

Opposition political party in Djibouti

Republican Alliance for Democracy French: Alliance Républicaine pour la Démocratie Arabic: التحالف الجمهوري من أجل الديمقراطية
- Leader: Qasim Ahmed Dini
- Founded: 1992
- Ideology: Liberalism; Social liberalism; Equality of rights; Economic liberalism
- National affiliation: Union for National Salvation
- National Assembly: 0 / 65

The Republican Alliance for Democracy (French: Alliance Républicaine pour la Démocratie, Arabic: التحالف الجمهوري من أجل الديمقراطية) is an opposition political party in Djibouti, founded by Ahmed Dini Ahmed. In the parliamentary election held on 10 January 2003, the party was part of the Union for a Democratic Change (Union pour l'Alternance Démocratique), which won 37.3% of the popular vote but no seats in the National Assembly.
