= 2003 Djiboutian parliamentary election =

- 10 January 2003

All 65 seats in the National Assembly 33 seats needed for a majority
- Registered: 178,799
- Turnout: 47.84% (▼8.87pp)
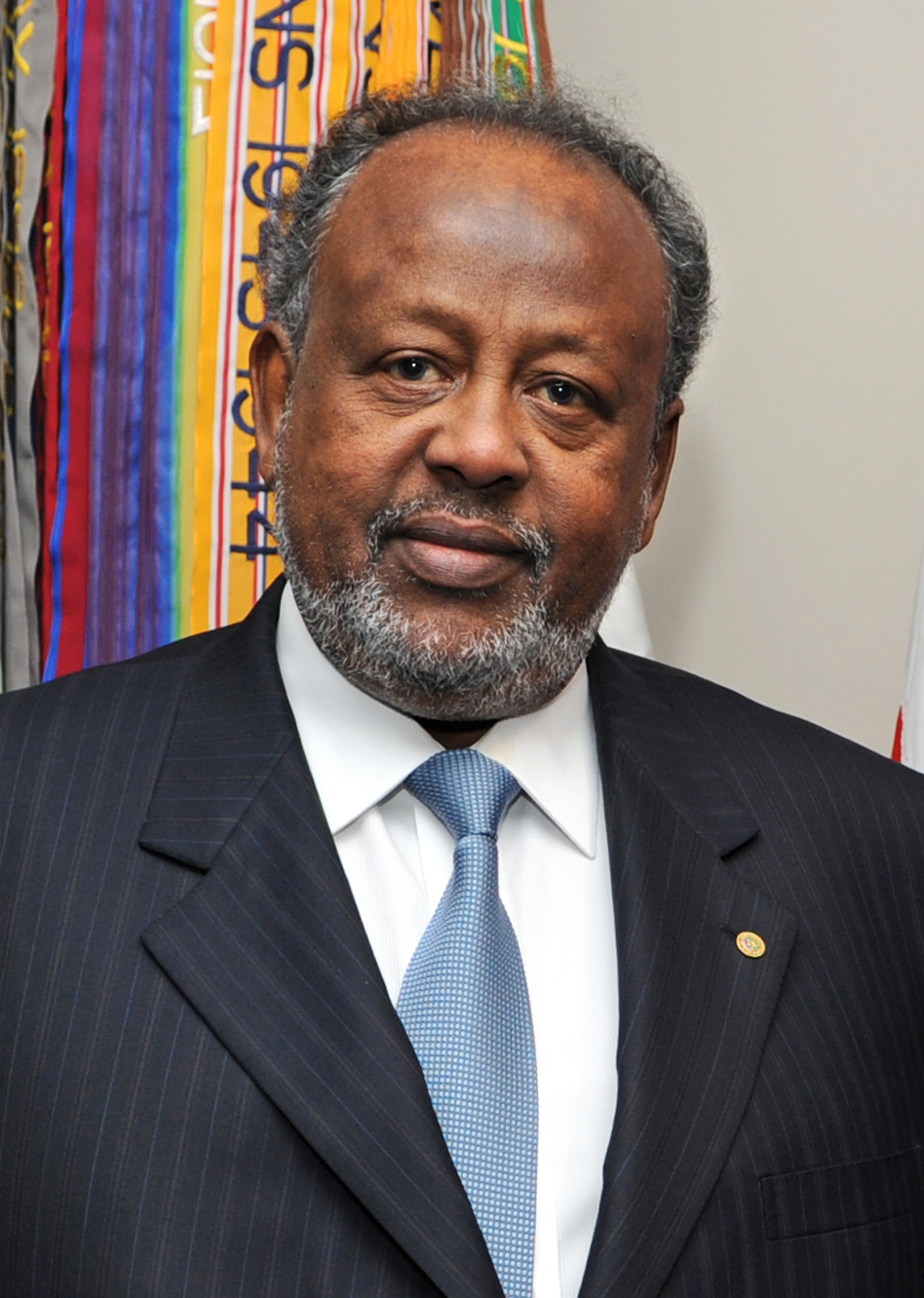
	First party
Leader	Ismaïl Omar Guelleh
Party	UMP
Seats won	65
Seat change	Steady
Popular vote	52,411
Percentage	62.40%
Swing	▼18.11pp
- Results by region
President of the National Assembly before election
Said Ibrahim Badoul
RPP
Elected President of the National Assembly
Idriss Arnaoud Ali
RPP

Parliamentary elections were held in Djibouti on 10 January 2003 to elect the National Assembly of Djibouti. The ruling coalition of President Ismail Omar Guelleh won all 65 seats in the election, defeating an opposition coalition.

The elections were the first in which women were elected to parliament after a new law was passed requiring a minimum of 10% male or female candidates in candidate lists.

== Background ==
After being a one-party state from 1977 to 1992, limited opposition was allowed in the previous two parliamentary elections. However, the 1997 elections still saw supporters of President Guelleh win every seat in Parliament. The situation was changed for the 2003 elections, with a law that had previously restricted the number of political parties to four expiring, and full multi-party democracy was allowed.

== Electoral system ==
Members of the National Assembly were elected from five constituencies with different numbers of seats. In each constituency, the party or coalition with the most votes won all of the seats in the constituency.

== Campaign ==
The elections were contested between two coalitions. The ruling Union for a Presidential Majority led by Prime Minister Dileita Mohamed Dileita comprised the parties People's Rally for Progress, Front for Restoration of Unity and Democracy, National Democratic Party and the Social Democratic People's Party. They were opposed by the Union for a Democratic Alternative (UAD) coalition led by a former Prime Minister Ahmed Dini Ahmed. The UAD consisted of the Republican Alliance for Democracy, Movement for Democratic Renewal and Development, Djibouti Party for Development and the Djibouti Union for Democracy and Justice.

Five of the parties in these coalitions were new, having been formed after the law restricting the number of political parties had expired. The opposition alliance was hurt by the decision of Aden Robleh Awaleh and his National Democratic Party to move from the opposition to being a member of the government coalition. Government supporters attacked the opposition leader Ahmed Dini Ahmed for his previous role as a leader of the Front for the Restoration of Unity and Democracy during the Djiboutian Civil War in the early 1990s. The Union for the Presidential Majority called for voters to support them so they could continue to bring economic development to Djibouti and to reduce poverty and unemployment. Meanwhile, the opposition criticised the government's record, accusing it of numerous failures and called on voters to bring political change to Djibouti.

== Results ==
The results saw the Union for the Presidential Majority win all of the seats in the Djibouti parliament after topping the vote in all five constituencies. The opposition came closest to winning seats in the capital Djibouti city where they won just short of 45% of the vote. The election saw seven women – Hawa Ahmed Youssouf, Ismahan Abdi Douksieh, Hasna Hassan Ali, Mariam Ibrahim Farah, Kadidja Mohamed Ali, Hasna Mohamed Dato and Aïcha Mohamed Robleh – elected to parliament for the first time.

International election monitors generally praised the election saying that "the electoral operations have been free from irregularities". However the opposition denounced the results saying that they were fraudulent and that there had been ballot stuffing, multiple voting and some voting cards had not been distributed. The opposition leader Dini said he would take their case to the constitutional court, but called on his supporters to not launch street protests.

Party	Votes	%	Seats	+/–
Union for the Presidential Majority	52,411	62.40	65	0
Union for a Democratic Alternative	31,581	37.60	0	0
Total	83,992	100.00	65	0
Valid votes	83,992	98.19		
Invalid/blank votes	1,548	1.81		
Total votes	85,540	100.00		
Registered voters/turnout	178,799	47.84		
Source: African Elections Database
