= Hasna Barkat Daoud =

- حسناء بركات داود
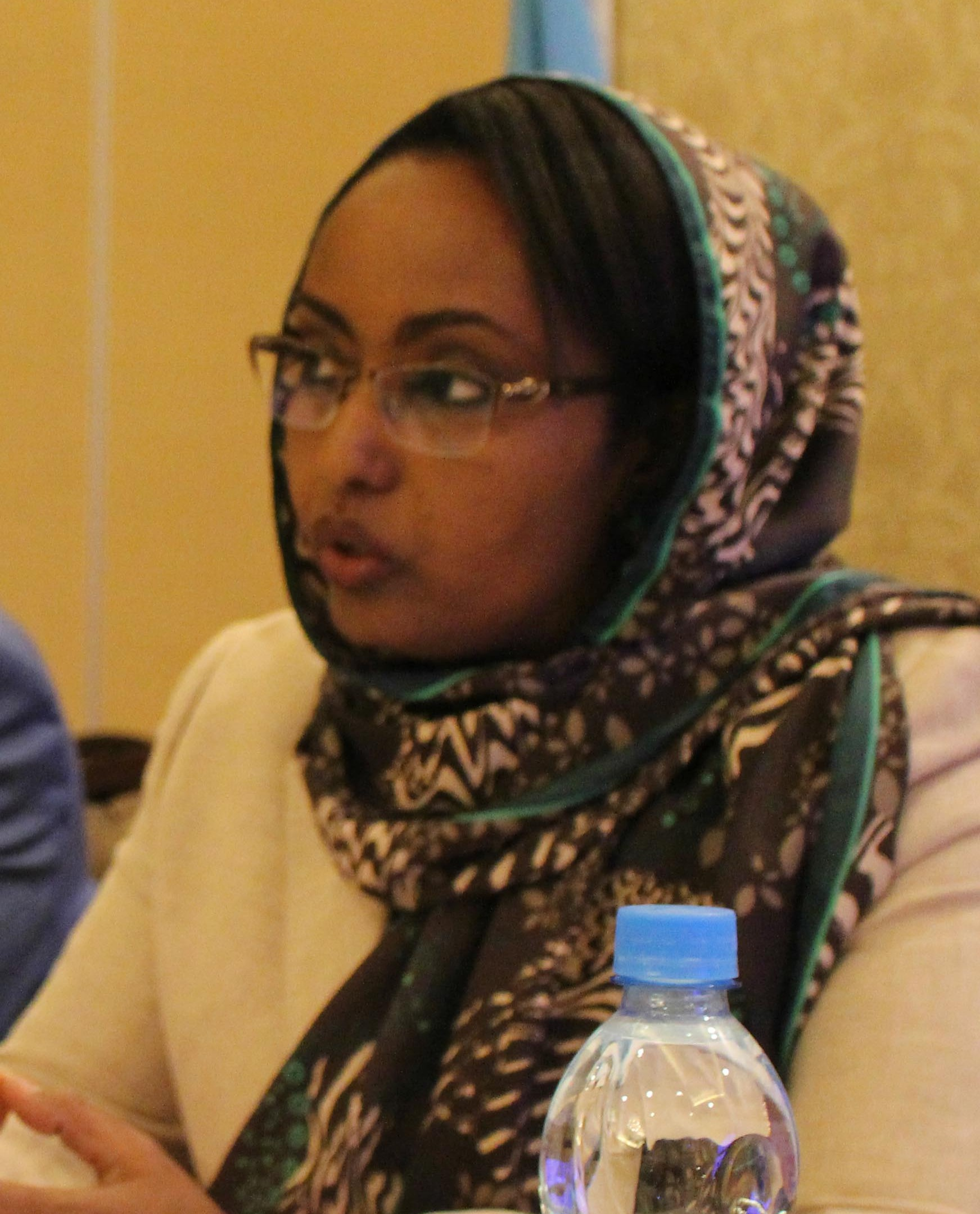
- Daoud in 2015

Minister of Youth, Sport and Tourism
- Incumbent
- Assumed office 2010

Minister of Women and Family Planning
- Incumbent
- Assumed office 2012

Personal details
- Occupation: Lawyer

Hasna Barkat Daoud is a Djiboutian lawyer and former government minister.

== Career ==
Hasna Barkat Daoud was minister of youth, sport and tourism since at least 2010 under President Ismaïl Omar Guelleh. In this capacity she represented Djibouti at the May 2010 Sixth Meeting of the executive committee of the Greater Horn Horizon Forum which discussed the role of youth, the media and non-governmental organisations in the region. Daoud had been Minister of Women and Family Planning and concurrently Minister of Relations with Parliament since at least 2012. In her women and family planning role she hosted a United Nations Economic Commission for Africa conference on the eradication of female genital mutilation in February 2014, a cause close to the heart of first lady Kadra Mahamoud Haid. Daoud launched the Intergovernmental Authority on Development Women and Peace Forum on 25 October 2015 in Djibouti. At this event she emphasised the role of women in peacemaking, regional integration and social and economic development. Daoud attended the 18th International Conference on AIDS and STIs in Africa in Harare, Zimbabwe in December 2015.

Daoud stood down from both ministerial roles on 15 May 2016. She now practices as a lawyer in the capital city.
