= Oceania =

Continent/geographical region in the Pacific Ocean

Coordinates: 13°21′0″S 176°8′22″W

- An orthographic projection of Oceania, in the intermediate conception that includes Australia and New Guinea but excludes the Malay Archipelago
- Area: 9,000,000 km^{2} (3,500,000 sq mi) (7th)
- Population: ▲44,491,724 (2021, 6th)
- Population density: 5.19/km^{2} (13.4/sq mi)
- GDP (nominal): $1.830 trillion (2026, 6th)
- GDP per capita: $75.648 (2026, 2nd)
- Religions: 62.1% Christianity; 32.7% Protestantism; 24.1% Catholicism; 4.8% other Christian; 36.4% no religion; 1.3% other
- Demonym: Oceanian
- Countries: (14): Australia; Cook Islands; Fiji; Kiribati; Marshall Islands; Micronesia; Nauru (Naoero); New Zealand; Niue; Palau; Papua New Guinea; Samoa; Solomon Islands; Tonga; Tuvalu; Vanuatu; Indonesia (via Western New Guinea provinces)
- Dependencies: External (23): Australia (5); Ashmore and Cartier Islands; Christmas Island; Cocos (Keeling) Islands; Coral Sea Islands; Norfolk Island; Fiji (1); Rotuma; France (3); French Polynesia; New Caledonia; Wallis and Futuna; New Zealand (1); Tokelau; Papua New Guinea (1); Bougainville; United Kingdom (1); Pitcairn Islands; United States (11); American Samoa; Baker Island; Guam; Howland Island; Jarvis Island; Johnston Atoll; Kingman Reef; Midway Atoll; Northern Mariana Islands; Palmyra Atoll; Wake Island; Internal (10): Chile (1); Easter Island; Indonesia (7); Maluku (Aru Islands); Central Papua; Highland Papua; Papua; South Papua; Southwest Papua; West Papua; Japan (1); Ogasawara; United States (1); Hawaii
- Languages: Official (30): Bislama; Carolinian; Chamorro; Chinese; Cook Islands Māori; English; Fiji Hindi; Fijian; French; Gilbertese; Hawaiʻian; Hiri Motu; Indonesian; Malay; Japanese; Māori; Marshallese; Nauruan; New Zealand Sign Language; Niuean; Norfuk; Palauan; Pitkern; Rapa Nui; Rotuman; Samoan; Spanish; Tok Pisin; Tokelauan; Tongan; Tuvaluan
- Time zones: UTC+8 (Western Australia, Australia) to UTC–6 (Easter Island, Chile) (west to east)
- Largest cities: 10 largest cities in Oceania: 1 Sydney, Australia; 2 Melbourne, Australia; 3 Brisbane, Australia; 4 Perth, Australia; 5 Auckland, New Zealand; 6 Adelaide, Australia; 7 Honolulu, United States; 8 Gold Coast–Tweed Heads, Australia; 9 Christchurch, New Zealand; 10 Newcastle–Maitland, Australia
- UN M49 codes: 009 – Oceania; 001 – World

Oceania (Note: UK: /ˌoʊ.si.ˈɑː.ni.ə, ˌoʊ.ʃi.-, -ˈeɪ.n-/ OH-s(h)ee-AH-nee-ə, -AY-, US: /ˌoʊ.ʃi.ˈæ.ni.ə, -ˈɑː.n-/ OH-shee-A(H)N-ee-ə) is a geographical region including The CommonwAustralasia, Melanesia, Micronesia, and Polynesia. Outside of the English-speaking world, Oceania is generally considered a continent, while Mainland Australia is regarded as its continental landmass. Spanning the Eastern and Western hemispheres, at the centre of the water hemisphere, Oceania is estimated to have a land area of about 9,000,000 square kilometres (3,500,000 sq mi) and a population of around 44.4 million as of 2022. Oceania is the smallest continent in land area and the second-least populated after Antarctica.

Oceania has a diverse mix of economies from the highly developed and globally competitive financial markets of Australia, French Polynesia, Hawaii, New Caledonia, and New Zealand, which rank high in quality of life and the Human Development Index, to the much less developed economies of Kiribati, Papua New Guinea, Tuvalu, Vanuatu, and Western New Guinea. The largest and most populous country in Oceania is Australia, and the largest city is Sydney. Puncak Jaya in Indonesia is the highest peak in Oceania at 4,884 m (16,024 ft).

The first settlers of Australia, New Guinea, and the large islands just to the east arrived more than 60,000 years ago. Oceania was first explored by Europeans from the 16th century onward. Portuguese explorers, between 1512 and 1526, reached the Tanimbar Islands, some of the Caroline Islands, and west New Guinea. Spanish and Dutch explorers followed, then British and French. On his first voyage in the 18th century, James Cook, who later arrived at the highly developed Hawaiian Islands, went to Tahiti and followed the east coast of Australia for the first time. The arrival of European settlers in subsequent centuries resulted in a significant alteration in the social and political landscape of Oceania. The Pacific theatre saw major action during the First and Second World Wars.

The rock art of Aboriginal Australians is the longest continuously practiced artistic tradition in the world. Most Oceanian countries are parliamentary democracies, with tourism serving as a large source of income for the Pacific island nations.

== Etymology ==
Oceania is from the French océanie, coming from Greek Okeanòs, Ωκεανός, ocean. It was coined in 1812 by geographer Conrad Malte-Brun.

== Definition ==
=== Characteristics ===
Oceania with its sovereign states and dependent territories within the subregions Australasia, Melanesia, Micronesia, and Polynesia

Definitions of Oceania vary. The broadest definition encompasses the islands between mainland Asia and the Americas. The island nation of Australia is the only piece of land in the area which is large enough to typically be considered a continent, as Zealandia is usually considered a microcontinent. The culture of the people who lived on these islands was often distinct from that of Asia and pre-Columbian America. Before Europeans arrived in the area, the sea shielded Australia and south-central Pacific islands from cultural influences that spread through large continental landmasses and adjacent islands. The islands of the Malay Archipelago, north of Australia, mainly lie on the continental shelf of Asia, and their inhabitants had more exposure to mainland Asian culture as a result of this closer proximity.

Mercator Planisphere by A.-H. Brué (1816), showing Océanie, the Grand Océan, and Polynésie including all the islands of the Pacific Ocean

The geographer Conrad Malte-Brun coined the French expression Terres océaniques ('Oceanic lands') c. 1804. In 1814, another French cartographer, Adrien-Hubert Brué, coined from this expression the shorter Océanie, which derives from the Latin word oceanus, and this from the Greek word ὠκεανός (ōkeanós), 'ocean'. The term Oceania is used because it is the ocean that links the parts of the region together, unlike the other continental groupings. John Eperjesi's 2005 book The Imperialist Imaginary says that since the mid-19th century, Western cartographers have used the term Oceania to organize and classify the Pacific region.

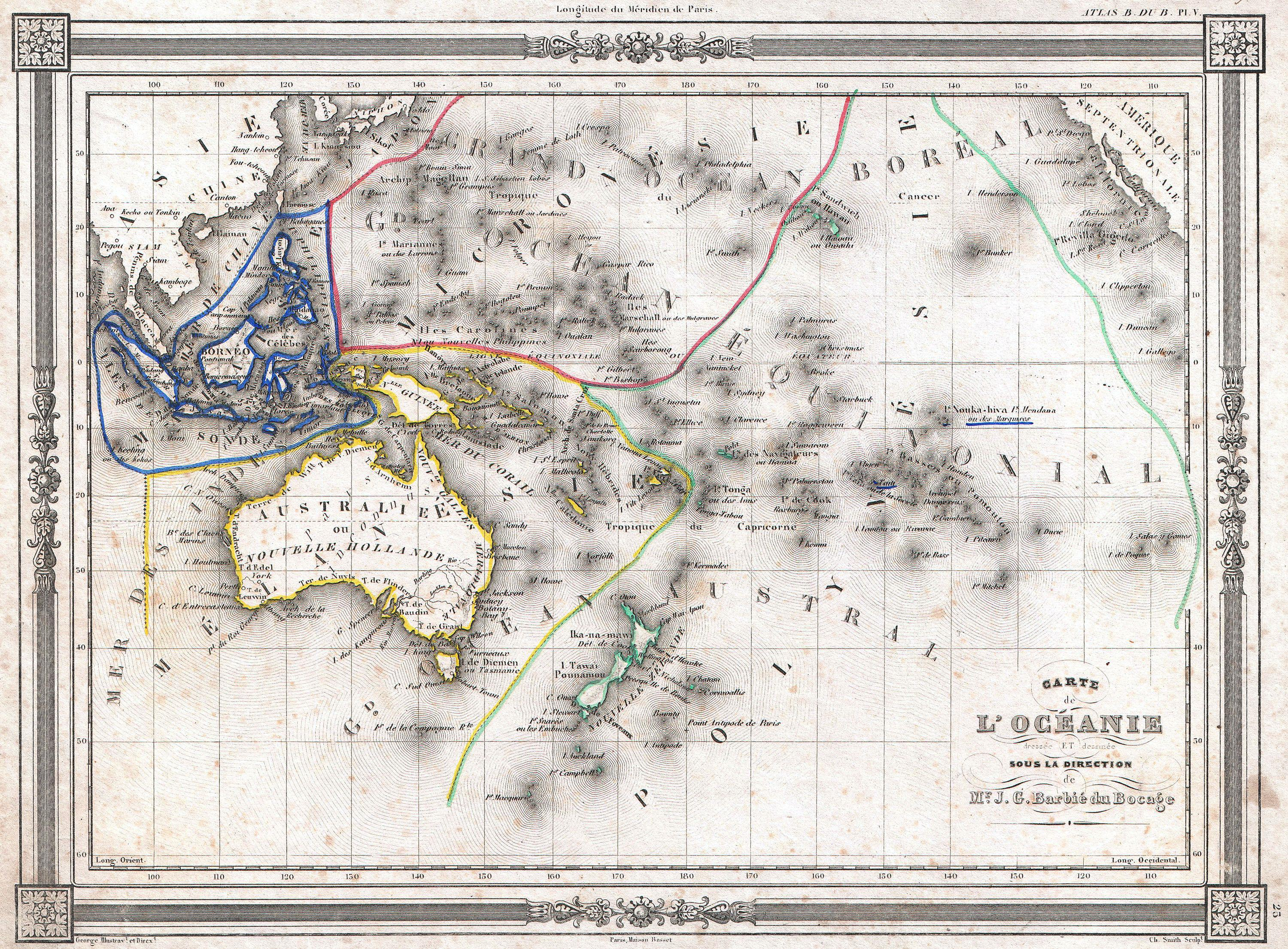
1852 map by Jean-Denis Barbié du Bocage. Includes regions of Polynesia, Micronesia, Melanesia, and Malesia

In the 19th century, many geographers divided Oceania into mostly racially based subdivisions: Australasia, Malesia (encompassing the Malay Archipelago), Melanesia, Micronesia, and Polynesia. The 2011 book Maritime Adaptations of the Pacific, by Richard W. Casteel and Jean-Claude Passeron, states that Oceania has traditionally been considered a continent in anthropological studies, similar to Africa, Asia, and the Americas. Bartholomew described Oceania as one of six major world divisions, including Australia and Pacific islands. American author Samuel Griswold Goodrich wrote in his 1854 book History of All Nations that some 19th-century geographers classified the Pacific islands as a third continent called Oceania, alongside the New and Old Worlds. In this book, the other two continents were categorised as being the New World (the Americas) and the Old World (Afro-Eurasia). In his 1879 book Australasia, British naturalist Alfred Russel Wallace commented that geographers commonly used Oceania to refer to the Pacific islands, with Australia as its central landmass. He did not explicitly label Oceania a continent in the book, but did note that it was one of the six major divisions of the world. The Oxford Handbook of World History (2011) describes that Oceania is often treated as a secondary topic in world history, appearing at the end of global narratives as a marginal region.

In most non-English-speaking countries, Oceania is treated as a continent in the sense that it is "one of the parts of the world", and Australia is only seen as an island nation. In other non-English-speaking countries, Australia and Eurasia are thought of as continents, while Asia, Europe, and Oceania are regarded as "parts of the world". Various writers from English-speaking countries have also described Oceania as a continent over the years. Prior to the 1950s, before the popularisation of the theory of plate tectonics, Antarctica, Australia, and Greenland were sometimes described as island continents, but none were usually taught as one of the world's continents in the English-speaking countries. In his 1961 book The United States and the Southwest Pacific, American author Clinton Hartley Grattan commented that, by 1961, the term Oceania to describe Australia, New Zealand, and the Pacific Islands was considered somewhat outdated. Australia is a founding member of the Pacific Islands Forum in 1971, and at times has been interpreted as the largest Pacific island. Some geographers group the Australian tectonic plate with others in the Pacific to form a geological continent. National Geographic defines Oceania as a continent based on its connection to the Pacific Ocean rather than landmass. Others have labelled it as the "liquid continent". The Pacific Ocean itself has been labelled as a "continent of islands", and it contains approximately 25,000 islands, which is more than all the other major oceans combined. In a 1991 article, American archeologist Toni L. Carrell wrote, The vast size and distances within the Pacific Basin make it challenging to view it as a single geographical unit. Oceania's subregions of Australasia, Melanesia, Micronesia, and Polynesia cover two major plates: the Australian Plate (also known as the Indo-Australian Plate) and the Pacific Plate, in addition to two minor plates: the Nazca Plate and the Philippine Sea Plate. The Australian Plate includes Australia, Fiji, New Caledonia, Papua New Guinea, Vanuatu, and parts of New Zealand. The Pacific Plate covers the Solomon Islands and parts of New Zealand, as well as Micronesia (excluding the westernmost islands near the Philippine Sea Plate) and Polynesia (excluding Easter Island). The Nazca Plate, which includes Easter Island, neighbours the South American Plate, and is still considered to be a separate tectonic plate, despite only containing a handful of islands.

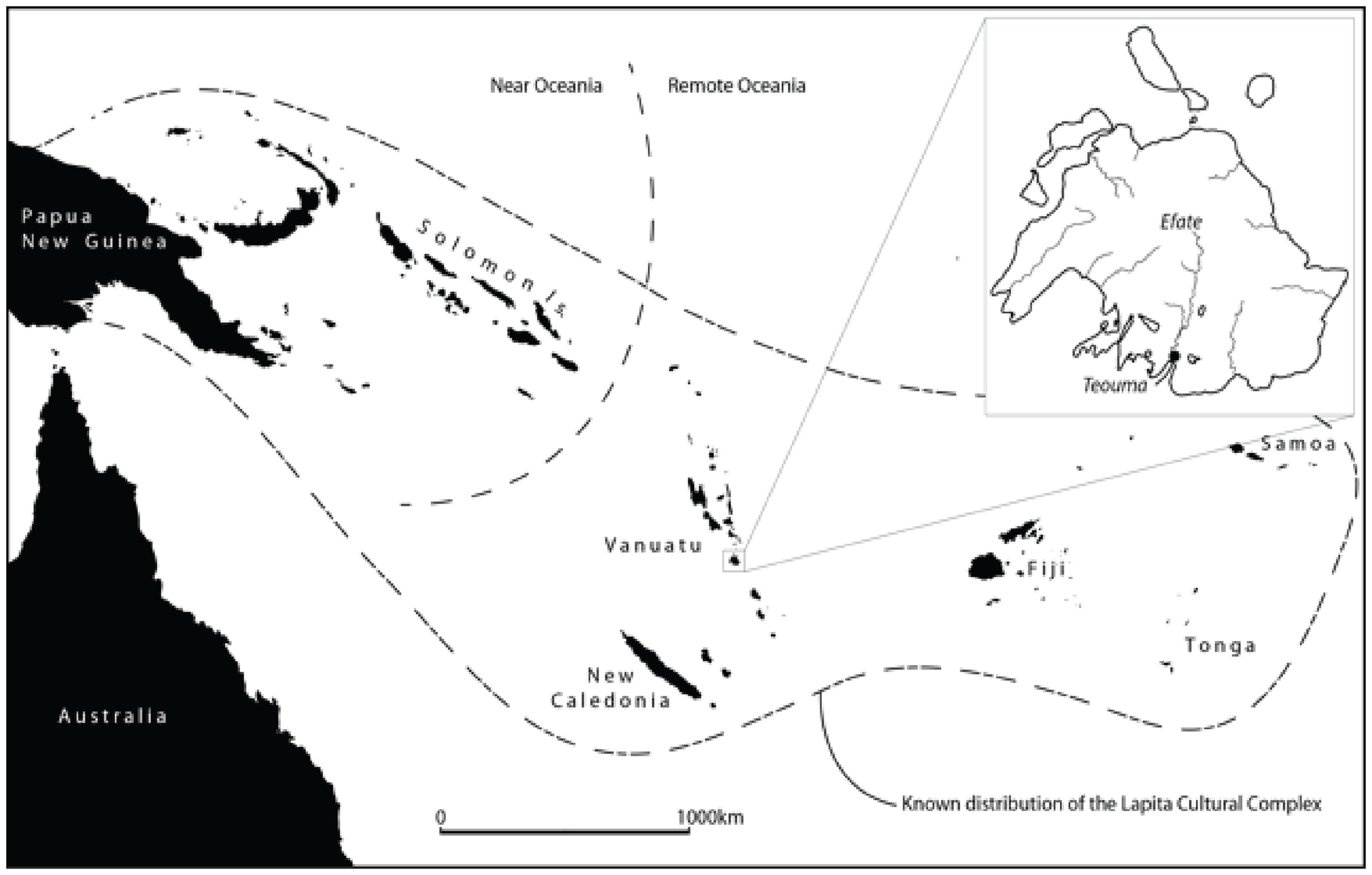
Map displaying parts of Near Oceania and Remote Oceania with a focus on Efate

The new terms Near Oceania and Remote Oceania were proposed in 1973 by anthropologists Roger Green and Andrew Pawley. By their definition, Near Oceania consists of New Guinea, the Bismarck Archipelago, and the Solomon Islands, except the Santa Cruz Islands. They are designed to dispel the outdated categories of Melanesia, Micronesia, and Polynesia; many scholars now replace those categories with Green's terms since the early 1990s, but the old categories are still used in science, popular culture and general usage.

=== Boundaries ===
Islands that are generally considered to be at the geographic extremes of Oceania are: the Bonin Islands, a politically integral part of Japan; Hawaii, a state of the United States; Clipperton Island, a possession of France; Rapa Nui (Easter Island), belonging to Chile; and Macquarie Island, belonging to Australia.

==== United Nations interpretation ====
The United Nations (UN) has used its own geopolitical definition of Oceania since its foundation in 1947, which utilizes four of the five subregions from the 19th century: Australasia, Melanesia, Micronesia, and Polynesia. This definition consists of discrete political entities and so excludes the Bonin Islands, Hawaii, Clipperton Island, and the Juan Fernández Islands, along with Easter Island, which was annexed by Chile in 1888. It is used in statistical reports, by the International Olympic Committee, and by many atlases. The UN categorizes Oceania, and by extension the Pacific area, as one of the major continental divisions of the world, along with Africa, Asia, Europe, and the Americas. Their definition includes American Samoa, Australia and their external territories, the Cook Islands, Federated States of Micronesia, French Polynesia, Fiji, Guam, Kiribati, the Marshall Islands, Nauru, New Caledonia, New Zealand, Niue, the Northern Mariana Islands, Palau, Papua New Guinea Pitcairn Islands, Samoa, the Solomon Islands, Tokelau, Tonga, Tuvalu, Vanuatu, Wallis and Futuna, and the United States Minor Outlying Islands (Baker Island, Howland Island, Jarvis Island, Midway Atoll, Palmyra Atoll, and Wake Island). The original UN definition of Oceania from 1947 included these same countries and semi-independent territories, which were mostly still colonies at that point. Hawaii had not yet become a U.S. state in 1947, and as such was part of the original UN definition of Oceania. The island states of Indonesia, Japan, the Philippines, Singapore, and Taiwan, all located within the bounds of the Pacific or associated marginal seas, are excluded from the UN definition; already in 1947 Dutch New Guinea was counted as part of Asia. The states of Hong Kong and Malaysia, located in both mainland Asia and marginal seas of the Pacific, are also excluded, as are Brunei, East Timor, and Indonesian New Guinea/Western New Guinea. The CIA World Factbook also categorizes Oceania as one of the major continental divisions of the world, but the name "Australia and Oceania" is used. Their definition does not include all of Australia's external territories, but is otherwise the same as the UN's definition, and is also used for statistical purposes. The Pacific Islands Forum expanded during the early 2010s, and areas that were already included in the UN definition of Oceania, such as French Polynesia, gained membership.

==== Early interpretations ====
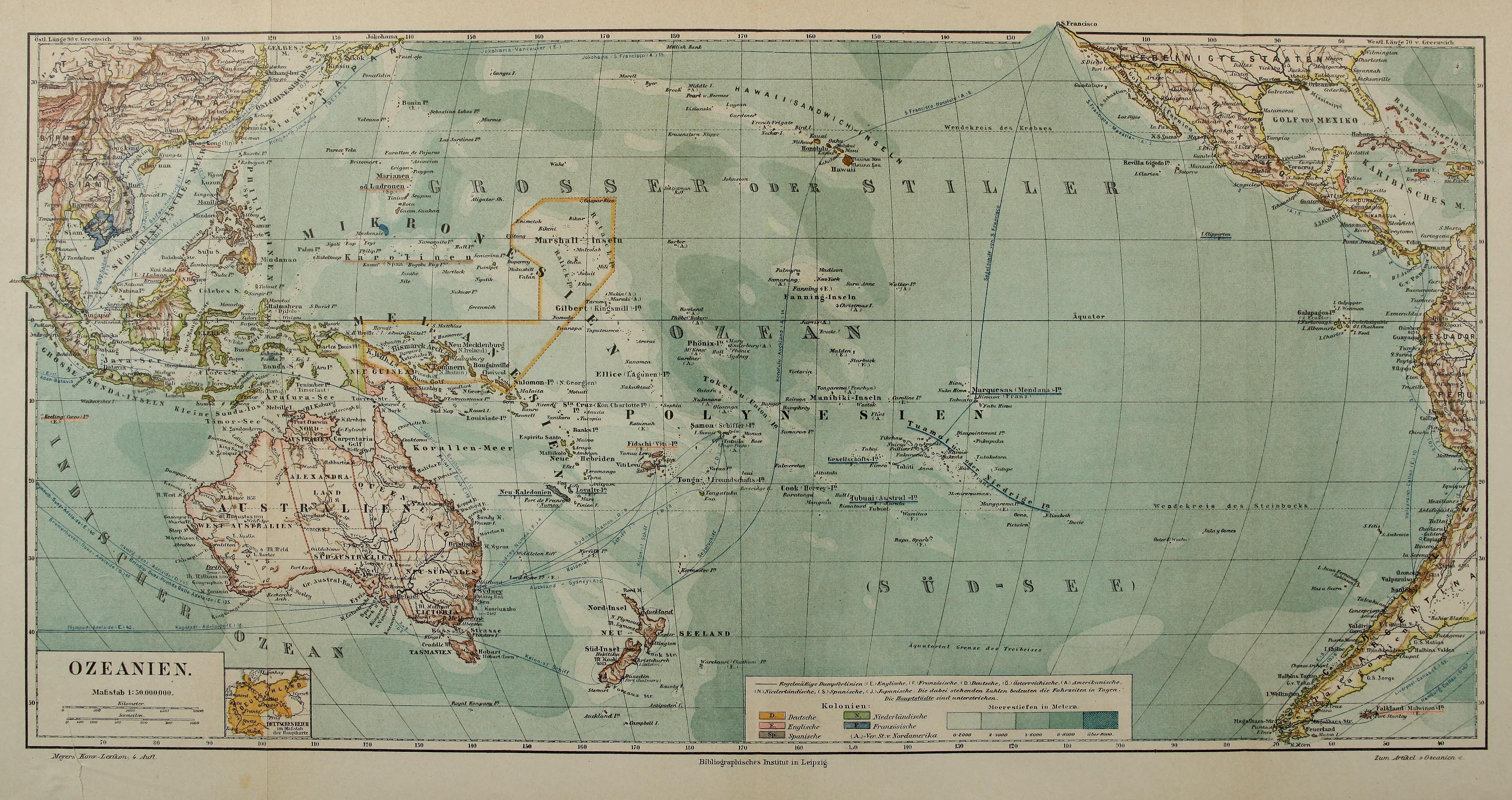
A German map of Oceania from 1884, showing the region to encompass Australia and all islands between Asia and Latin America

French writer Gustave d'Eichthal remarked in 1844 that Oceania's boundaries extended across the entire Pacific Ocean. Conrad Malte-Brun in 1824 defined Oceania as covering Australia, New Zealand, the islands of Polynesia (which then included all the Pacific islands) and the Malay Archipelago. Worcester described Oceania as a collection of numerous Pacific islands, categorizing it as one of the world's five major divisions. He also viewed Oceania as covering Australia, New Zealand, the Malay Archipelago and the islands of Melanesia, Micronesia, and Polynesia. In 1887, the Royal Asiatic Society of Great Britain and Ireland referred to Australia as the area's westernmost land, while in 1870, British Reverend Alexander Mackay identified the Bonin Islands as its northernmost point, and Macquarie Island as its southernmost point. The Bonin Islands at that time were a possession of Britain; Macquarie Island, to the south of Tasmania, is a subantarctic island in the Pacific. It was politically associated with Australia and Tasmania by 1870.

Alfred Russel Wallace believed in 1879 that Oceania extended to the Aleutian Islands, which are among the northernmost islands of the Pacific. The islands, now politically associated with Alaska, have historically had inhabitants who were related to Indigenous Americans, in addition to having non-tropical biogeography similar to that of Alaska and Siberia. Wallace insisted that while the surface area of this wide definition was greater than that of Asia and Europe combined, the land area was only a little greater than that of Europe. American geographer Sophia S. Cornell claimed that the Aleutian Islands were not part of Oceania in 1857. She stated that Oceania was divided up into three groups: Australasia (which included Australia, New Zealand, and the Melanesian islands), Malesia (which included all present-day countries within the Malay Archipelago, not the modern country of Malaysia) and Polynesia (which included both the Polynesian and Micronesian islands in her definition). Aside from mainland Australia, areas that she identified as of high importance were Borneo, Hawaii, Indonesia's Java and Sumatra, New Guinea, New Zealand, the Philippines, French Polynesia's Society Islands, Tasmania, and Tonga.

American geographer Jesse Olney's 1845 book A Practical System of Modern Geography defined Oceania as consisting of the many islands of the Pacific located southeast of Asia. Olney divided up Oceania into three groups: Australasia (which included Australia, New Guinea, and New Zealand), Malesia and Polynesia (which included the combined islands of Melanesia, Micronesia, and Polynesia in his definition). Publication Missionary Review of the World claimed in 1895 that Oceania was divided into five groups: Australasia, Malesia, Melanesia, Micronesia, and Polynesia. It did not consider Hawaii to be part of Polynesia, due to its geographic isolation, commenting that Oceania also included "isolated groups and islands, such as the Hawaiian and Galápagos." In 1876, French geographer Élisée Reclus described Australia's plant life as highly distinctive and noted that Hawaii and the Galápagos had significant numbers of unique, endemic plant species. Rand McNally & Company, an American publisher of maps and atlases, defined Oceania as including Australia and the Pacific islands while classifying the Malay Archipelago as part of Asia. British linguist Robert Needham Cust argued in 1887 that the Malay Archipelago should be excluded since it had participated in Asian civilisation. Cust considered Oceania's four subregions to be Australasia, Melanesia, Micronesia and Polynesia. New Zealand was categorised by him as being in Polynesia; and the only country in his definition of Australasia was Australia. His definition of Polynesia included both Easter Island and Hawaii, which had not yet been annexed by either Chile or the United States.

The Journal of the Royal Statistical Society stated in 1892 that Australia was a large island within Oceania rather than a small continent. It additionally commented:

It is certainly not necessary to consider the Hawaiian Islands and Australia as being in the same part of the world; it is, however, permissible to unite in one group all the islands which are scattered over the great ocean. It should be remarked that if we take the Malay Archipelago away from Oceania, as do generally the German geographers, the insular world contained in the great ocean is cut in two, and the least populated of the five parts of the world is diminished to increase the number of inhabitants of the most densely populated continent.

Regarding Australia and the Pacific, Chambers's New Handy Volume American Encyclopædia observed in 1885 that the term "Oceania" has been used interchangeably with "Australasia," though often excluding the Malay Archipelago, which some writers referred to as "Malesia". It added that there was controversy over the exact limits of Oceania, saying that the encyclopaedia mentioned the lack of agreement among geographers about the exact boundaries of Oceania. British physician and ethnologist James Cowles Prichard stated that the Aleutian and Kuril Islands, along with the coasts of Asia and America, marked the northern boundary of Oceania. However, Prichard argued that these islands were generally not considered part of Oceania because their inhabitants were not connected to the indigenous peoples of the more remote Pacific islands. He added that Hawaii was the most northerly area to be inhabited by races associated with Oceania.

The 1926 book Modern World History, 1776&ndash- 1926, by Alexander Clarence Flick, considered Oceania to include all islands in the Pacific, and associated the term with the Malay Archipelago, the islands of Melanesia, Micronesia, and Polynesia, the Aleutian Islands, Japan's Ryukyu Islands, Taiwan, and the Kuril Islands. He further included in his definition Sakhalin, an island which is geologically part of the Japanese Archipelago, but that has been administered by Russia since World War II. Hong Kong, partly located in another marginal sea of the Pacific (the South China Sea), was also included in his definition. Australia and New Zealand were grouped by Flick as Australasia and categorised as being in the same area of the world as the islands of Oceania. Flick described the demographic composition of Oceania, stating that the majority of the population consisted of "brown and yellow races," while whites were primarily "owners and rulers." Hutton Webster's 1919 book Medieval and Modern History also defined Oceania broadly, stating that it encompassed all islands in the Pacific. Webster broke Oceania up into two subdivisions: the continental group, which included Australia, the Japanese archipelago, the Malay Archipelago, and Taiwan, and the oceanic group, which included New Zealand and the islands of Melanesia, Micronesia, and Polynesia.

Charles Marion Tyler's 1885 book The Island World of the Pacific Ocean considered Oceania to ethnographically encompass Australia, New Zealand, the Malay Archipelago, and the islands of Melanesia, Micronesia, and Polynesia. However, Tyler included other Pacific islands in his book as well, such as the Aleutian Islands, the Bonin Islands, the Japanese archipelago, the Juan Fernández Islands, the Kuril Islands, the Ryukyu Islands, Taiwan, California's Channel Islands and Farallon Islands, Canada's Vancouver Island and Queen Charlotte Islands (now known as Haida Gwaii), Chile's Chiloé Island, Ecuador's Galápagos Islands, Mexico's Guadalupe Island, Revillagigedo Islands, San Benito Islands and Tres Marías Islands, and Peru's Chincha Islands. Islands in marginal seas of the Pacific were also covered in the book, including Alaska's Pribilof Islands and China's Hainan. Tyler additionally profiled the Anson Archipelago, which during the 19th century was a designation for a widely scattered group of purported islands in the Northwestern Pacific Ocean between Japan and Hawaii. The Anson archipelago included phantom islands such as Ganges Island and Los Jardines which were proven to not exist, as well as real islands such as Marcus Island and Wake Island. Tyler described Australia as "the leviathan of the island groups of the world". In his 1857 book A Treatise on Physical Geography, Francis B. Fogg defined Oceania, or "the Maritime World," as being divided into three major subregions: Australasia, Malesia, and Polynesia. Fogg defined Polynesia as covering the combined islands of Melanesia, Micronesia, and Polynesia, as well as the Ryukyu Islands. He listed additional significant islands in the Pacific beyond those in the standard subregions of Oceania. Scottish academic John Merry Ross in 1879 considered Polynesia to cover the entire South and Central Pacific area, not just islands ethnographically within Polynesia. He wrote in The Globe Encyclopedia of Universal Information that, in its broadest sense, Polynesia could include islands spanning from Sumatra to the Galápagos, along with Australia. Ross acknowledged that Oceania had historically been applied to this vast region but noted that, by his time, the Malay Archipelago was often excluded.

==== Historical and contemporary interpretations ====
In a 1972 article for the Music Educators Journal titled Musics of Oceania, author Raymond F. Kennedy wrote:

Many meanings have been given to the word Oceania. The most inclusive–but not always the most useful–embraces about 25,000 land areas between Asia and the Americas. A more popular and practical definition excludes Indonesia, East Malaysia (Borneo), the Philippines, Taiwan, Japan, and other islands closely related to the Asian mainland, as well as the Aleutians and the small island groups situated near the Americas. Thus, Oceania most commonly refers to the land areas of the South and Central Pacific.

Kennedy defined Oceania as including Australasia, Melanesia, Micronesia, and Polynesia. The U.S. Government Publishing Office's Area Handbook for Oceania from 1971 states that Australia and New Zealand are the principal large sovereignties of the area. It further states:

In its broadest definition, Oceania embraces all islands and island groups of the Pacific Ocean that lie between Asia and the two American continents. In popular usage, however, the designation has a more restricted application. The islands of the North Pacific, such as the Aleutians and the Kuriles, are usually excluded. In addition, the series of sovereign island nations fringing Asia (Japan, Taiwan, the Philippines, East Malaysia, the Republic of Indonesia) is not ordinarily considered to be part of the area.

In 1948, American military journal Armed Forces Talk broke the islands of the Pacific up into five major subdivisions: Indonesia, Melanesia, Micronesia, Polynesia, and the non-tropical Islands. The Indonesian subdivision consisted of the islands of the Malay Archipelago, while the non-tropical islands were categorised as being North Pacific islands, such as Alaska's Kodiak archipelago, the Aleutian Islands, Japan, the Kuril Islands, and Sakhalin. Japan's Bonin and Ryukyu Islands are also considered to be subtropical islands, with the main Japanese archipelago being non-tropical. The journal associated the term Oceania with the Melanesian, Micronesian, and Polynesian subdivisions, but not with the Indonesian or non-tropical subdivisions. The Pacific Islands Handbook (1945), by Robert William Robson, stated that, "Pacific Islands generally are regarded as Pacific islands lying within the tropics. There are a considerable number of Pacific Islands outside the tropics. Most of them have little economic or political importance." He noted the political significance of the Aleutian Islands, which were invaded by the Japanese military in World War II, and categorised New Zealand's Antipodes Islands, Auckland Islands, Bounty Islands, Campbell Islands, Chatham Island and Kermadec Islands as being non-tropical islands of the South Pacific, along with Australia's Lord Howe Island and Norfolk Island. The Kermadec Islands, Lord Howe Island, and Norfolk Island are also considered to be subtropical islands. Other non-tropical areas below the equator, such as Chiloé Island, Macquarie Island, Tasmania, and the southern portions of mainland Australia and New Zealand, were not included in this category.

According to the 1998 book Encyclopedia of Earth and Physical Sciences, Oceania refers to Australasia, Melanesia, Micronesia, Polynesia, and more than 10,000 islands scattered across the Pacific Ocean. It notes that "the term [has] also come under scrutiny by many geographers. Some experts insist that Oceania encompasses even the cold Aleutian Islands and the islands of Japan. Disagreement also exists over whether or not Indonesia, the Philippines, and Taiwan should be included in Oceania." The Japanese Archipelago, the Malay Archipelago and Taiwan and other islands near China are often deemed as a geological extension of Asia, since they do not have oceanic geology, instead being detached fragments of the Eurasian continent that were once physiographically connected. Certain Japanese islands off the main archipelago are not geologically associated with Asia. The book The World and Its Peoples: Australia, New Zealand, Oceania (1966) asserts that, "Japan, Taiwan, the Aleutian Islands, Indonesia, the Philippines and Malaysia [and] the Pacific archipelagos bordering upon the Far East Asian mainland are excluded from Oceania", and that "all the islands lying between Australia and the Americas, including Australia, are part of Oceania." Furthermore, the book adds that Hawaii is still within Oceania, despite being politically integrated into the U.S., and that the Pacific Ocean "gives unity to the whole" since "all these varied lands emerge from or border upon the Pacific."

The 1876 book The Countries of the World, by British scientist and explorer Robert Brown, labelled the Malay Archipelago as Northwestern Oceania, but Brown still noted that these islands belonged more to the Asian continent. They are now often referred to as Maritime Southeast Asia, with Indonesia, Malaysia, the Philippines, and Singapore being founding members of the ASEAN regional organisation for Southeast Asia in 1967 (Brunei and East Timor did not exist as independent nations at that point). Brown also categorised Japan and Taiwan as being in the same part of the world as the islands of Oceania, and excluded them from The Countries of the World: Volume 5, which covered mainland Asia and Hong Kong. However, Brown did not explicitly associate Japan or Taiwan with the term Oceania. He divided Oceania into two subregions: Eastern Oceania, which included the islands of Melanesia, Micronesia, and Polynesia, and Southwestern Oceania, which included Australia and New Zealand. The Galápagos Islands, the Juan Fernández Islands, and the Revillagigedo Islands were identified as the easternmost areas of Oceania in the book. Brown wrote, "they lie nearest the American continent of all oceanic islands, and though rarely associated with Polynesia, and never appearing to have been inhabited by any aboriginal races, are, in many ways, remarkable and interesting." Brown went on to add, "the small islands lying off the continent, like the Queen Charlotte's in the North Pacific, the Farallones off California, and the Chinchas off Peru are – to all intents and purposes – only detached bits of the adjoining shores. But in the case of the Galápagos, at least, this is different." The Juan Fernández Islands and the neighbouring Desventuradas Islands are today seen as the easternmost extension of the Indo-West Pacific biogeographic region. The islands lie on the Nazca Plate with Easter Island and the Galápagos Islands, and have a significant south-central Pacific component to their marine fauna. According to scientific journal PLOS One, the Humboldt Current helps create a biogeographic barrier between the marine fauna of these islands and South America. Chile's government has occasionally considered them to be within Oceania along with Easter Island. Chile's government also categorizes Easter Island, the Desventuradas Islands, and the Juan Fernández Islands as being part of a region titled Insular Chile. They further include in this region Salas y Gómez, a small uninhabited island to the east of Easter Island. PLOS One describes Insular Chile as having "cultural and ecological connections to the broader insular Pacific."

A map of member states for the Pacific Islands Forum; the member states are depicted in blue. The PIF is a governing organisation for the Pacific, and all of its members are seen as being politically within Oceania. Territories ethnographically associated with Oceania, but not politically associated with Oceania, such as Easter Island, Hawaii, and Western New Guinea, have considered gaining representation in the PIF. The Pacific island nations of Indonesia, Japan, Malaysia, the Philippines, Singapore, and Taiwan are dialogue partners, but none have full membership. East Timor, located in the marginal seas of the Pacific and Indian Oceans, also has observer status.

An exclusive economic zone map of the Pacific which includes areas not politically associated with Oceania, that may be considered geographically or geologically within Oceania

In her 1997 book Australia and Oceania, Australian historian Kate Darian-Smith defined the area as covering Australia, New Zealand, and the islands of Melanesia, Micronesia, and Polynesia. She excluded Hawaii from her definition, but not Easter Island. The International Union for Conservation of Nature stated in a 1986 report that they include Easter Island in their definition of Oceania "based on its Polynesian and biogeographic affinities even though it is politically apart", further noting that other oceanic islands administered by Latin American countries had been included in definitions of Oceania. In 1987, the Journal of Australasian Cave Research described Oceania as being "the region from Irian Jaya (Western New Guinea, a province of New Guinea) in the west to Galápagos Islands (Ecuador) and Easter Island (Chile) in the east." In a 1980 report on venereal diseases in the South Pacific, the British Journal of Venereal Diseases categorised the Desventuradas Islands, Easter Island, the Galápagos Islands and the Juan Fernández Islands as being in an eastern region of the South Pacific, along with areas such as Pitcairn Islands and French Polynesia, but noted that the Galápagos Islands were not a member of the South Pacific Commission, like other islands in the South Pacific. The South Pacific Commission is a developmental organisation formed in 1947 and is currently known as the Pacific Community; its members include Australia and other Pacific Islands Forum members. In a 1947 article on the formation of the South Pacific Commission for the Pacific Affairs journal, author Roy E. James stated the organisation's scope encompassed all non-self-governing islands below the equator to the east of Papua New Guinea (which itself was included in the scope and then known as Dutch New Guinea). Easter Island and the Galápagos Islands were defined by James as falling within the organisation's geographical parameters. The 2007 book Asia in the Pacific Islands: Replacing the West, by New Zealand Pacific scholar Ron Crocombe, defined the term "Pacific Islands" as being islands in the South Pacific Commission, and stated that such a definition "does not include Galápagos and other [oceanic] islands off the Pacific coast of the Americas; these were uninhabited when Europeans arrived, then integrated with a South American country and have almost no contact with other Pacific Islands." He adds, "Easter Island still participates in some Pacific Island affairs because its people are Polynesian."

Thomas Sebeok's two-volume 1971 book Linguistics in Oceania defines Easter Island, the Galápagos Islands, the Juan Fernández Islands, Costa Rica's Cocos Island and Colombia's Malpelo Island (all oceanic) as making up a Spanish language segment of Oceania. Cocos Island and Malpelo Island are the only landmasses located on the Cocos Plate, which is to the north of the Nazca Plate. The book observed that a native Polynesian language was still understood on Easter Island, unlike on the other islands, which were uninhabited when discovered by Europeans and were mostly used as prisons for convicts. Additionally, the book includes Taiwan and the entire Malay Archipelago as part of Oceania. While not oceanic in nature, Taiwan and Malay Archipelago countries like Indonesia and the Philippines share Austronesian ethnolinguistic origins with Melanesia, Micronesia and Polynesia, hence their inclusion in the book. Hainan, which neighbours Taiwan, also has Austronesian ethnolinguistic origins, although it was not included in the book. The book defined Oceania's major subregions as being Australia, Indonesia (which included all areas associated with the Malay Archipelago), Melanesia, Micronesia, and Polynesia. In 2010, Australian historian Bronwen Douglas claimed in The Journal of Pacific History that "a strong case could be made for extending Oceania to at least Taiwan, the homeland of the Austronesian language family whose speakers colonised significant parts of the region about 6,000 years ago." For political reasons, Taiwan was a member of the Oceania Football Confederation during the 1970s and 1980s, rather than the Asian Football Confederation.

Ian Todd's 1974 book Island Realm: A Pacific Panorama also defines oceanic Latin American islands as making up a Spanish-language segment of Oceania, and includes the Desventuradas Islands, Easter Island, the Galápagos Islands, Guadalupe Island, the Juan Fernández Islands, the Revillagigedo Islands, and Salas y Gómez. Cocos Island and Malpelo Island were not explicitly referenced in the book, despite being areas that would fall within this range. All other islands associated with Latin American countries were excluded, as they are continental in nature, unlike Guadalupe Island and the Revillagigedo Islands (both situated on the Pacific Plate) and the oceanic islands situated on the Cocos Plate and Nazca Plate. Todd defined the oceanic Bonin Islands as making up a Japanese language segment of Oceania, and excluded the main Japanese archipelago. Todd further included the Aleutian Islands in his definition of Oceania. The island chain borders both the Pacific Plate and the North American Plate, and is geologically a partially submerged volcanic extension of the Aleutian Range on the Alaskan mainland. He did not include the volcanic Kuril Islands and Ryukyu Islands, which similarly border both the Eurasian Plate and the Pacific Plate, nor did he include the neighbouring Kodiak archipelago in the North Pacific Ocean, which is firmly situated on the North American Plate. The Stockholm Journal of East Asian Studies stated in 1996 that Oceania was defined as Australia and an ensemble of various Pacific Islands, "particularly those in the central and south Pacific [but] never those in the extreme north, for example the Aleutian chain." In the Pacific Ocean Handbook (1945), author Eliot Grinnell Mears claimed, "it is customary to exclude the Aleutians of the North Pacific, the American coastal islands and the Netherlands East Indies", and that he included Australia and New Zealand in Oceania for "scientific reasons; Australia's fauna is largely continental in character, New Zealand's are clearly insular; and neither Commonwealth realm has close ties with Asia." In his 2002 book Oceania: An Introduction to the Cultures and Identities of Pacific Islanders, Andrew Strathern excluded Okinawa and the rest of the Ryukyu Islands from his definition of Oceania, but noted that the islands and their indigenous inhabitants "show many parallels with Pacific island societies."

In the 2006 book Extinction and Biogeography of Tropical Pacific Birds, American paleontologist David Steadman wrote, "no place on earth is as perplexing as the 25,000 islands that make Oceania." Steadman viewed Oceania as encompassing Melanesia, Micronesia, and Polynesia (including Easter Island and Hawaii). He excluded from his definition the larger islands of New Guinea and New Zealand, and argued that Cocos Island, the Galápagos Islands, the Revillagigedo Islands, and other oceanic islands near the Americas were not part of Oceania, due to their biogeographical affinities with that area and lack of prehistoric indigenous populations. In his 2018 book Regionalism in South Pacific, Chinese author Yu Changsen wrote that some "stress a narrow vision of the Pacific as those Pacific Islands excluding Australia and even sometimes New Zealand", adding that the term Oceania "promotes a broader concept that has room for Australia and New Zealand."

American marine geologist Anthony A. P. Koppers wrote in the 2009 book Encyclopedia of Islands that, "as a whole, the islands of the Pacific Region are referred to as Oceania, the tenth continent on earth. Inherent to their remoteness and because of the wide variety of island types, the Pacific Islands have developed unique social, biological, and geological characteristics." Koppers considered Oceania to encompass the entire 25,000 islands of the Pacific Ocean. In this book, he included the Aleutian Islands, the Galápagos Islands, the Japanese archipelago, the Kuril Islands and continental islands off the coast of the Americas such as the Channel Islands, the Farallon Islands and Vancouver Island; all of these islands lie in or close to the Pacific Ring of Fire, as is the case with New Guinea and New Zealand, which were also included. In the 2013 book The Environments of the Poor in Southeast Asia, East Asia and the Pacific, Paul Bullen critiqued the definition of Oceania in Encyclopedia of Islands, and wrote that since Koppers included areas such as Vancouver Island, it is "not clear what the referents of 'Pacific Region', 'Oceania' or 'Pacific Islands' are." Bullen added, "Asia, Europe, and the Maritime Continent are not literal geographic continents. The 'Asia–Pacific region' would comprise two quasi-continents. 'The Pacific' would not refer to the Pacific Ocean and everything in it, e.g., the Philippines." The Concise Oxford Dictionary of World Place Names (2017), by John Everett-Heath, states that Oceania is "a collective name for more than 10,000 islands in the Pacific Ocean" and that "it is generally accepted that Indonesia, Japan, the Philippines, Taiwan, and the islands north of Japan (the Kurils and Aleutians) are excluded." In his 1993 book A New Oceania: Rediscovering Our Sea of Islands, New Guinea-born Fijian scholar Epeli Hauʻofa wrote that, "Pacific Ocean islands from Japan, through the Philippines and Indonesia, which are adjacent to the Asian mainland, do not have oceanic cultures, and are therefore not part of Oceania."

The Oxford Handbook of Prehistoric Oceania (2018) defined Oceania as only covering Austronesian-speaking islands in Melanesia, Micronesia, and Polynesia, with this definition including New Guinea and New Zealand. Other Austronesian areas, such as Indonesia and the Philippines, were not included due to their closer cultural proximity to mainland Asia. Australia was also not included, as it was settled several thousand years before the arrival of Austronesian-speaking peoples in Melanesia, Micronesia, and Polynesia. The book stated, "this definition of Oceania might seem too restrictive: Why not include Australia, for example, or even too broad, for what does Highland New Guinea have to do with Hawaiʻi?", further noting that, "a few other islands in the Pacific such as those of Japan or the Channel Islands off the southern California coast are not typically considered Oceania as the indigenous populations of these places do not share a common ancestry with Oceanic groups, except for a time far before humans sailed Pacific waters." It has been theorised that the indigenous Jōmon people of the Japanese archipelago are related to Austronesians, along with the indigenous inhabitants of the Ryukyu Islands. Some also theorize that Indigenous Australians are related to the Ainu people, who are the original inhabitants of Japan's Hokkaido, the Kuril Islands and the southern part of Sakhalin. In their 2019 book Women and Violence: Global Lives in Focus, Kathleen Nadeau and Sangita Rayamajhi wrote:

The Philippines, Malaysia, Brunei, and most of Indonesia are not usually considered to be part of the region of Oceania as it is understood today. These regions are usually considered to be part of Maritime Southeast Asia. These regions, as well as the large East Asian islands of Taiwan, Hainan, and the Japanese archipelago, have varying degrees of cultural connections.

In Reptiles and Amphibians of the Pacific Islands: A Comprehensive Guide (2013), George R. Zug claimed that "a standard definition of Oceania includes Australia, Papua New Guinea, the Solomon Islands, New Caledonia, and New Zealand, and the oceanic islands of Polynesia, Micronesia, and Melanesia." He went on to write that his preferred definition of Oceania emphasizes islands with oceanic geology, stating that oceanic islands are "islands with no past connections to a continental landmass" and that "these boundaries encompass the Hawaiian and Bonin Islands in the north and Easter Island in the south, and the Palau Islands in the west to the Galápagos Islands in the east." Australia, New Guinea, New Zealand and New Caledonia (which is geologically associated with New Zealand) were all excluded, as these areas are descendants of the ancient Pangaea supercontinent, along with landmasses such as the Americas and Afro-Eurasia. Volcanic islands which are geologically associated with continental landmasses, such as the Aleutian Islands, Japan's Izu Islands, the Kuril Islands, the Ryukyu Islands, and most of the Solomon Islands, were also excluded from his definition. Unlike the United Nations, the World Factbook defines the still-uninhabited Clipperton Island as being a discrete political entity, and they categorize it as part of North America, presumably due to its relative proximity (situated 1,200 kilometres off Mexico on the Pacific Plate). Clipperton is not politically associated with the Americas, as is the case with other oceanic islands near the Americas, having had almost no interaction with the continent throughout its history. From the early 20th century to 2007, the island was administratively part of French Polynesia, which itself was known as French Oceania up until 1957. In terms of marine fauna, Clipperton shares similarities with areas of the Pacific which are much farther removed from the Americas. Scottish author Robert Hope Moncrieff considered Clipperton to be the easternmost point of Oceania in 1907, while Ian Todd also included it in his definition of Oceania in Island Realm: A Pacific Panorama.

Other uninhabited Pacific Ocean landmasses have been explicitly associated with Oceania, including the highly remote Baker Island and Wake Island (now administered by the U.S. military). This is due to their location in the centre of the Pacific, their biogeography and their oceanic geology. Less isolated oceanic islands that were once uninhabited, such as the Bonin Islands, the Galápagos Islands and the Juan Fernández Islands, have since been sparsely populated by citizens of their political administrators. Archaeological evidence suggests that Micronesians may have lived on the Bonin Islands c. 2,000 years ago, but they were uninhabited at the time of European discovery in the 16th century.

==== Boundaries between subregions ====
Depending on the definition, New Zealand could be part of Polynesia, or part of Australasia with Australia. New Zealand was originally settled by the Polynesian Māori, and has long maintained a political influence over the subregion. Through immigration and high Māori birth rates, New Zealand has attained the largest population of Polynesians in the world, while Australia has the third largest Polynesian population (consisting entirely of immigrants). Modern-day Indigenous Australians are loosely related to Melanesians, and Australia maintains political influence over Melanesia, which is mostly located on the same tectonic plate. Despite this, Australia is rarely seen as a part of the subregion. As with Australia and New Zealand, Melanesia's New Caledonia has a significant non-indigenous European population, numbering around 71,000. Conversely, New Caledonia has still had a similar history to the rest of Melanesia, and its French-speaking Europeans make up only 27% of the total population. As such, it is not also culturally considered a part of the predominantly English-speaking Australasia. Some cultural and political definitions of Australasia include most or all of Melanesia, due to its geographical proximity to Australia and New Zealand, but these are rare. Australia, New Zealand and the islands of Melanesia are more commonly grouped together as part of the Australasian biogeographical realm. Papua New Guinea is geographically the closest country to Australia, and is often geologically associated with Australia as it was once physically connected. Australia's Indian Ocean external territories of Christmas Island and Cocos (Keeling) Islands are situated within the bounds of the Australian Plate and have been geographically associated with Southeast Asia, due to their proximity to western Indonesia. Both were uninhabited when discovered by Europeans during the 17th century. Approximately half of the population on these islands are European Australian mainlanders (with smaller numbers being European New Zealanders), while the other half are immigrants from China or the nearby Malay Archipelago. Australia's Indian Ocean external territory Heard Island and McDonald Islands lie on the Antarctic Plate and are also thought of as being in Antarctica or no region at all, due to their extreme geographical isolation. The World Factbook defines Heard Island and McDonald Islands as part of Antarctica, while placing Christmas Island and Cocos (Keeling) Islands as the westernmost extent of Oceania.

Norfolk Island, an external territory of Australia, was inhabited in prehistoric times by either Melanesians or Polynesians, and is geographically adjacent to the islands of Melanesia. The current inhabitants are mostly European Australians, and the UN categorizes it as being in the Australasia subregion. The 1982 edition of the South Pacific Handbook, by David Stanley, groups Australia, New Zealand, Norfolk Island, and Hawaiʻi together under an "Anglonesia" category. This is despite the geographical distance separating these areas from Hawaiʻi, which technically lies in the North Pacific. The 1985 edition of the South Pacific Handbook also groups the Galápagos Islands as being in Polynesia, while noting that they are not culturally a part of the subregion. The islands are typically grouped with others in the southeastern Pacific that were never inhabited by Polynesians.

The Bonin Islands are in the same biogeographical realm as the geographically adjacent Micronesia, and are often grouped in with the subregion because of this.

== History ==
=== Colonisation of Oceania ===
==== Australia ====
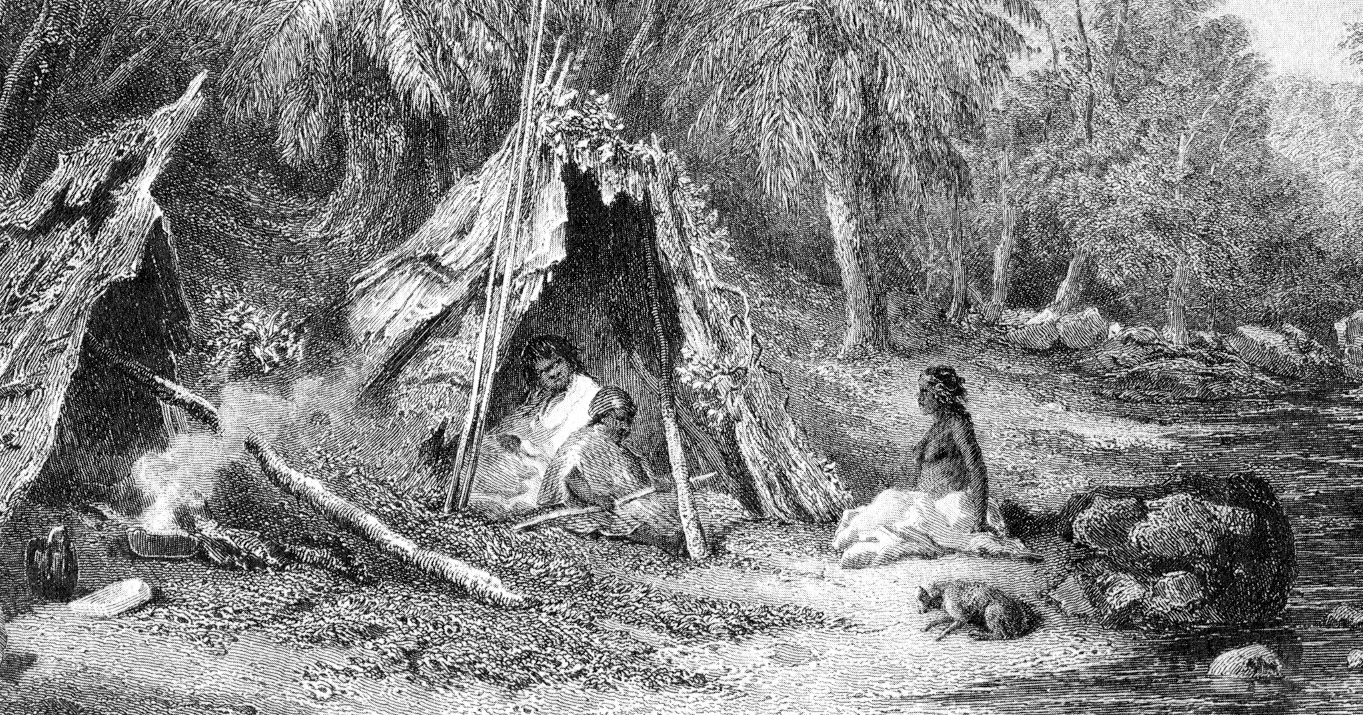
A 19th-century engraving of an Aboriginal Australian encampment

Indigenous Australians are the original inhabitants of the Australian continent and nearby islands who migrated from Africa to Asia c. 70,000 years ago and arrived in Australia c. 50,000 years ago. They are believed to be among the earliest human migrations out of Africa. Although they likely migrated to Australia through Southeast Asia, they are not demonstrably related to any known Asian or Polynesian population. There is evidence of genetic and linguistic interchange between Australians in the far north and the Austronesian peoples of modern-day New Guinea and the islands, but this may be the result of recent trade and intermarriage.

They reached Tasmania c. 40,000 years ago by migrating across a land bridge from the mainland that existed during the last ice age. It is believed that the first early human migration to Australia was achieved when this landmass formed part of the Sahul continent, connected to the island of New Guinea via a land bridge. The Torres Strait Islanders are indigenous to the Torres Strait Islands, which are at the northernmost tip of Queensland near Papua New Guinea. The earliest definite human remains found in Australia are those of Mungo Man, which have been dated to c. 40,000 years old.

It is estimated that 4% to 6% of the genome in Melanesians (e.g., Papua New Guinean and Bougainville Islander) derives from the Denisovan hominin, an ancient human species discovered in 2010, while no Eurasians or Africans displayed contributions of the Denisovan genes.

==== Melanesia ====
The original inhabitants of the group of islands now named Melanesia were likely the ancestors of the present-day Papuan-speaking people. Migrating from Southeast Asia, they appear to have occupied these islands as far east as the main islands in the Solomon Islands archipelago, including Makira and possibly the smaller islands farther to the east.

Particularly along the north coast of New Guinea and in the islands north and east of New Guinea, the Austronesian people, who had migrated into the area somewhat more than 3,000 years ago, came into contact with these pre-existing populations of Papuan-speaking peoples. In the late 20th century, some scholars theorised a long period of interaction, which resulted in many complex changes in genetics, languages, and culture among the peoples.

==== Micronesia ====
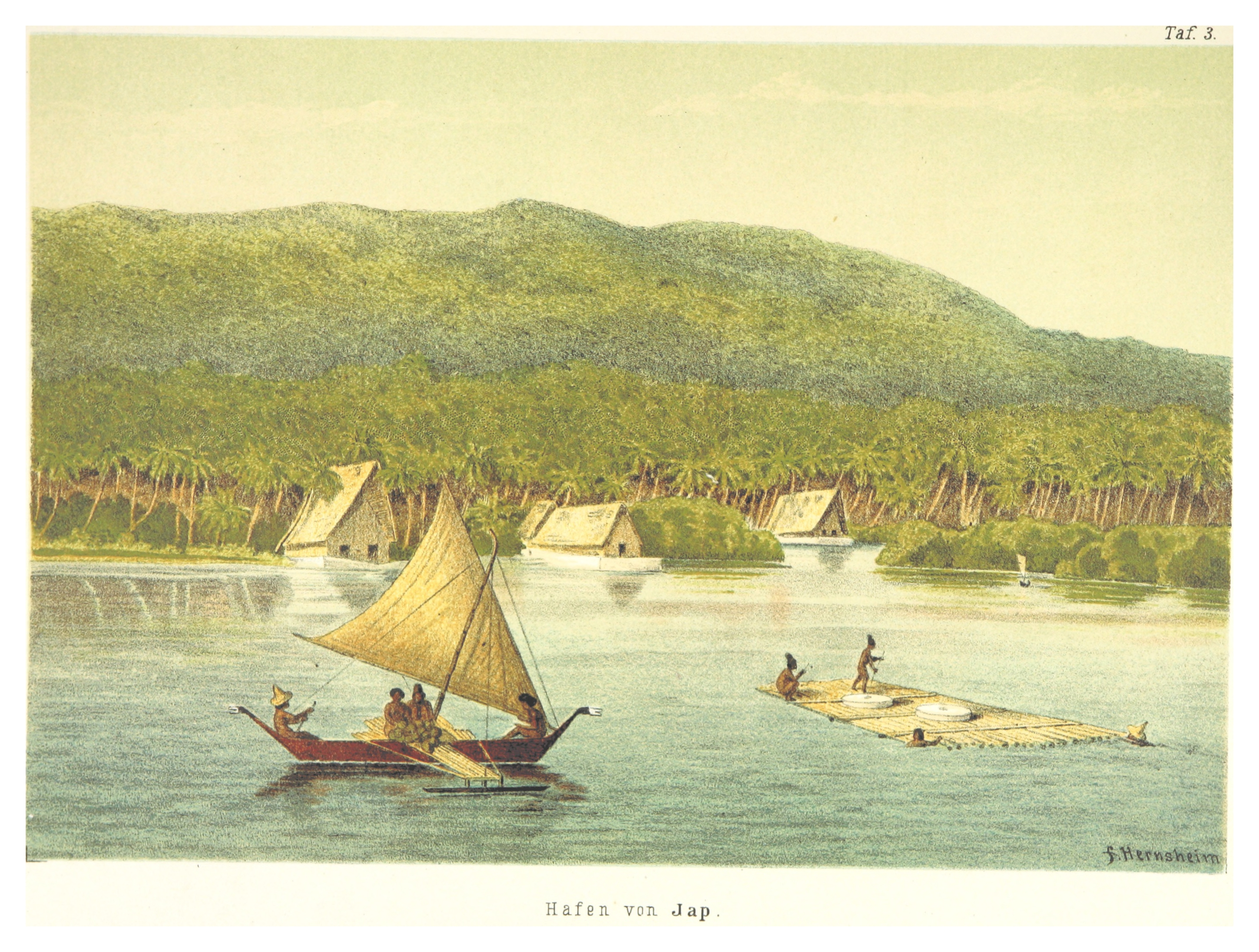
Stone money transport to Yap Island in Micronesia (1880)

Chronological dispersal of Austronesian people across the Pacific (per Bellwood in Chambers, 2008)

Micronesia began to be settled several millennia ago, although there are competing theories about the origin and arrival of the first settlers. There are numerous difficulties with conducting archaeological excavations in the islands, due to their size, settlement patterns, and storm damage. As a result, much evidence is based on linguistic analysis.

The earliest archaeological traces of civilisation have been found on the island of Saipan, dated to 1500 BCE or slightly before. The ancestors of the Micronesians settled there over 4,000 years ago. A decentralised chieftain-based system eventually evolved into a more centralised economic and religious culture centred on Yap and Pohnpei. The prehistories of many Micronesian islands, such as Yap, are not known very well.

The first people of the Northern Mariana Islands navigated to the islands and discovered them at some point between 4000 BCE and 2000 BCE from Southeast Asia. They became known as the Chamorros. Their language was named after them. The ancient Chamorro left several megalithic ruins, including Latte stone. The Refaluwasch or Carolinian people came to the Marianas in the 1800s from the Caroline Islands. Micronesian colonists gradually settled the Marshall Islands during the 2nd millennium BCE, with inter-island navigation made possible using traditional stick charts.

==== Polynesia ====
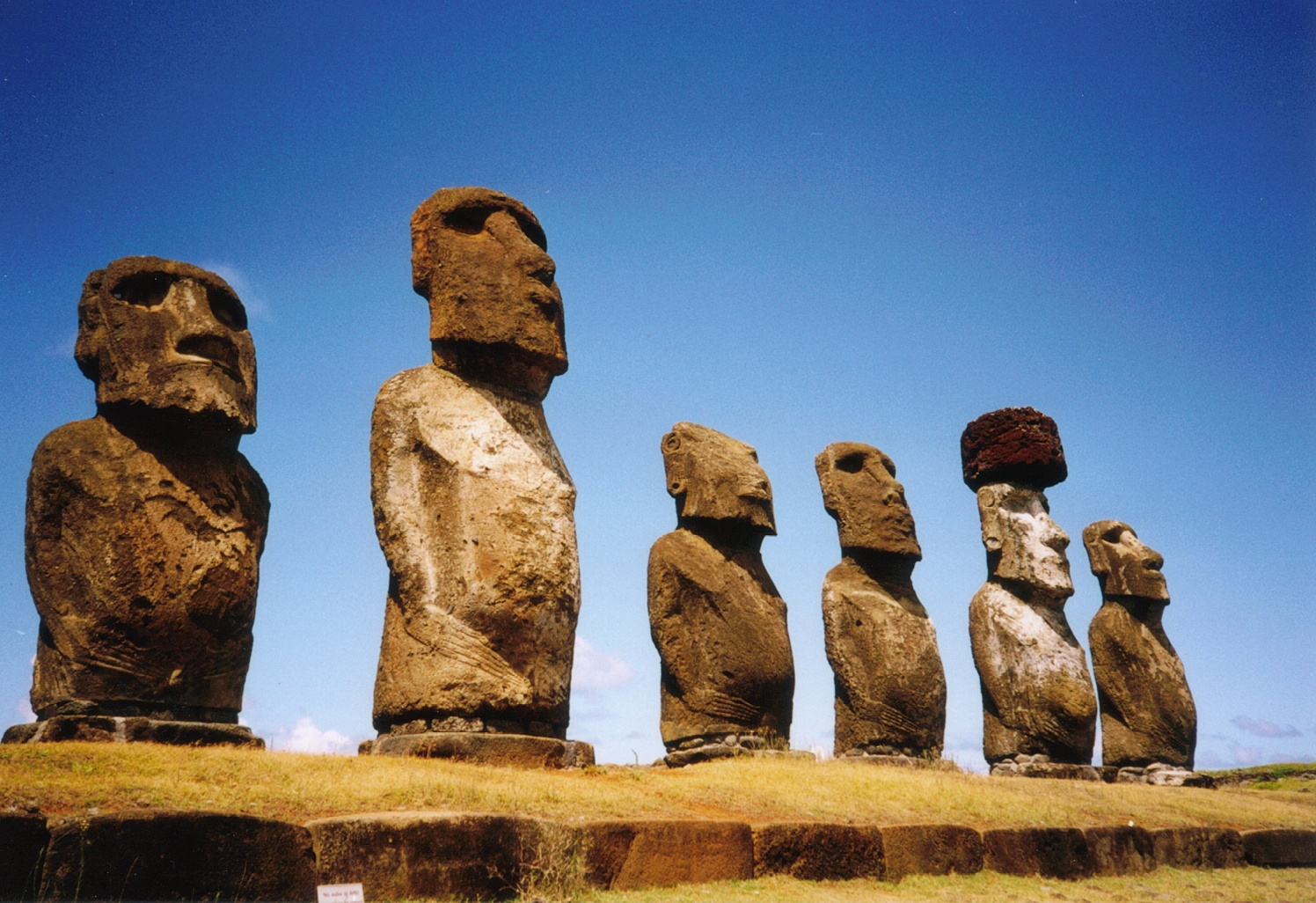
Moai at Ahu Tongariki on Rapa Nui (Easter Island)

The Polynesian people are considered to be, by linguistic, archaeological, and human genetic ancestry, a subset of the sea-migrating Austronesian people; tracing Polynesian languages places their prehistoric origins in the Malay Archipelago and, ultimately, in Taiwan. Between c. 3000 and 1000 BCE, speakers of Austronesian languages began spreading from Taiwan into Island Southeast Asia, as tribes whose natives were thought to have arrived through South China c. 8,000 years ago reached the edges of western Micronesia and on into Melanesia.

In the archaeological record, there are well-defined traces of this expansion that allow the path it took to be followed and dated with some certainty. It is thought that by roughly 1400 BCE, "Lapita Peoples", so-named after their pottery tradition, appeared in the Bismarck Archipelago of north-west Melanesia.

Easter Islanders claimed that a chief, Hotu Matuꞌa, discovered the island in one or two large canoes with his wife and extended family. They are believed to have been Polynesian. Around 1200, Tahitian explorers discovered and began settling the area. This date range is based on glottochronological calculations and on three radiocarbon dates from charcoal that appears to have been produced during forest clearance activities. Moreover, a recent study, which included radiocarbon dates from what is thought to be very early material, suggests that the island was discovered and settled as recently as 1200.

=== European exploration ===
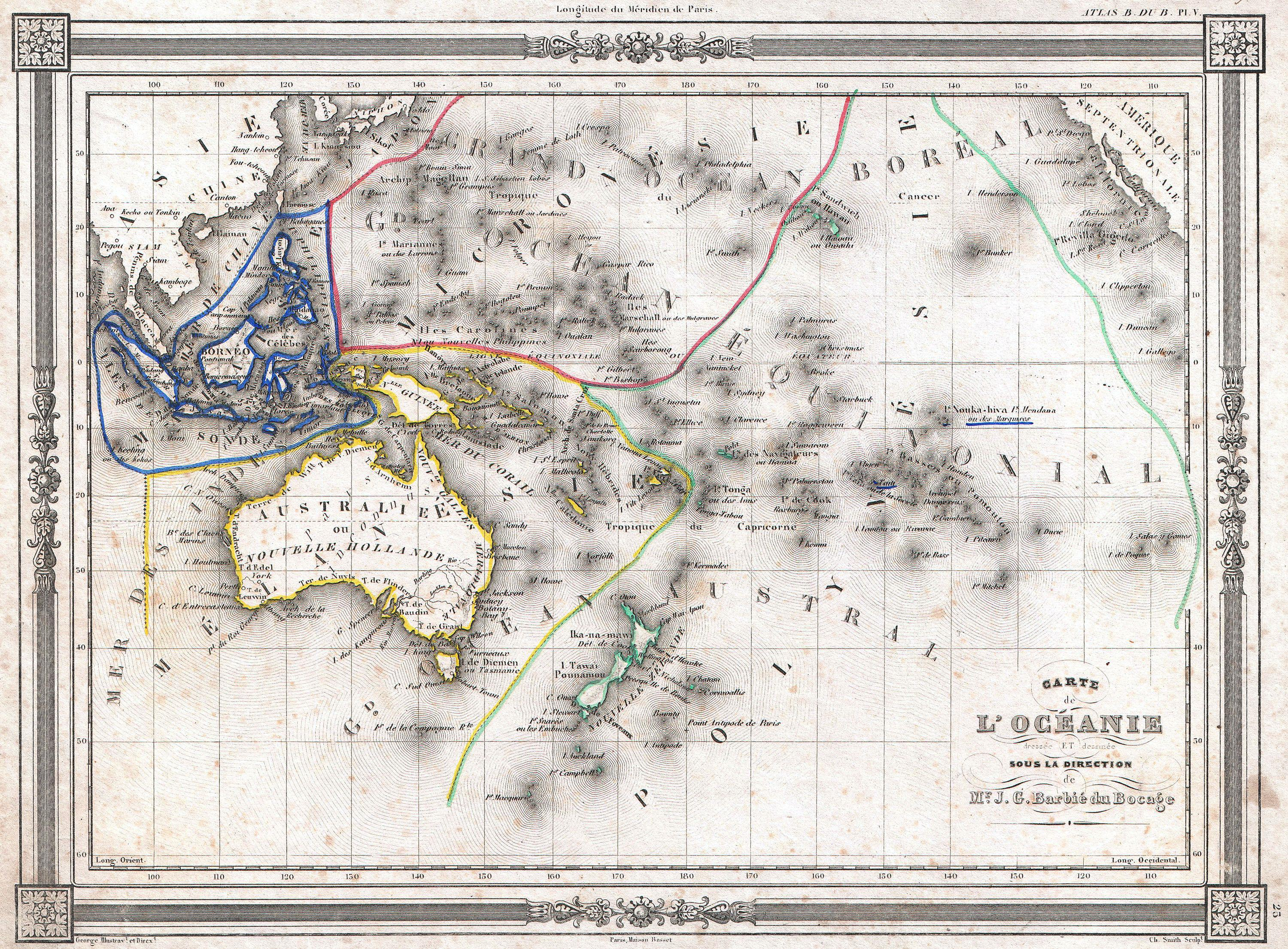
1852 map of Oceania by J. G. Barbié du Bocage. Includes regions of Polynesia, Micronesia, Melanesia, and Malesia.

Oceania was first explored by Europeans from the 16th century onwards. Portuguese navigators, between 1512 and 1526, reached the Maluku Islands (by António de Abreu and Francisco Serrão in 1512), Timor, the Aru Islands (Martim A. Melo Coutinho), the Tanimbar Islands, some of the Caroline Islands (by Gomes de Sequeira in 1525), and west Papua New Guinea (by Jorge de Menezes in 1526). In 1519, a Spanish expedition led by Ferdinand Magellan sailed down the east coast of South America, found and sailed through the strait that bears his name, and on 28 November 1520 entered the ocean which he named "Pacific". The three remaining ships, led by Magellan and his captains Duarte Barbosa and João Serrão, then sailed north and caught the trade winds which carried them across the Pacific to the Philippines, where Magellan was killed. One surviving ship led by Juan Sebastián Elcano returned west across the Indian Ocean, and the other went north in the hope of finding the westerlies and reaching Mexico. Unable to find the right winds, it was forced to return to the East Indies. The Magellan-Elcano expedition achieved the first circumnavigation of the world and reached the Philippines, the Mariana Islands, and other islands of Oceania.

From 1527 to 1595, several other large Spanish expeditions crossed the Pacific Ocean, leading to the arrival in the Marshall Islands and Palau in the North Pacific, as well as Tuvalu, the Marquesas Islands, the Solomon Islands archipelago, the Cook Islands, and the Admiralty Islands in the South Pacific.

In the quest for Terra Australis, Spanish explorations in the 17th century, such as the expedition led by the Portuguese navigator Pedro Fernandes de Queirós, sailed to the Pitcairn and Vanuatu archipelagos, and sailed the Torres Strait between Australia and New Guinea, named after navigator Luís Vaz de Torres. Willem Janszoon made the first completely documented European landing in Australia (1606), on the Cape York Peninsula. Abel Tasman circumnavigated and landed on parts of the Australian continental coast and discovered Van Diemen's Land (now Tasmania), New Zealand in 1642, and Fiji. He was the first known European explorer to reach these islands.

On 23 April 1770, British explorer James Cook made his first recorded direct observation of Aboriginal Australians at Brush Island near Bawley Point. On 29 April, Cook and crew made their first landfall on the mainland of the continent at a place now known as the Kurnell Peninsula. It is here that James Cook made first contact with an Aboriginal tribe known as the Gweagal. His expedition became the first recorded Europeans to have encountered the eastern coastline of Australia.

==== European settlement and colonisation ====
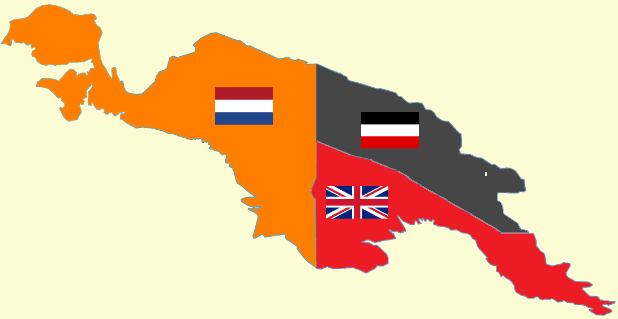
New Guinea from 1884 to 1919. The Netherlands controlled the western half of New Guinea, Germany the northeastern part, and Britain the southeastern part.

In 1789, the mutiny on the Bounty against William Bligh led to several of the mutineers escaping the Royal Navy and settling on the Pitcairn Islands, which later became a British colony. Britain also established colonies in Australia in 1788, New Zealand in 1840, and Fiji in 1872, with much of Oceania becoming part of the British Empire. The Gilbert Islands (now known as Kiribati) and the Ellice Islands (now known as Tuvalu) came under Britain's sphere of influence in the late 19th century.

French Catholic missionaries arrived on Tahiti in 1834; their expulsion in 1836 caused France to send a gunboat in 1838. In 1842, Tahiti and Tahuata were declared a French protectorate, to allow Catholic missionaries to work undisturbed. On 24 September 1853, under orders from Napoleon III, Admiral Febvrier Despointes took formal possession of New Caledonia.

The Spanish explorer Alonso de Salazar landed in the Marshall Islands in 1529. They were named by Krusenstern, after English explorer John Marshall, who visited them together with Thomas Gilbert in 1788, en route from Botany Bay to Canton (two ships of the First Fleet). In 1905, the British government transferred some administrative responsibility over southeast New Guinea to Australia (which renamed the area "Territory of Papua"), and in 1906, transferred all remaining responsibility to Australia. The Marshall Islands were claimed by Spain in 1874. Germany established colonies in New Guinea in 1884, and Samoa in 1900. The United States also expanded into the Pacific, beginning with Baker Island and Howland Island in 1857, and with Hawaiʻi becoming a US territory in 1898. Disagreements between the US, the UK, and Germany over Samoa led to the Tripartite Convention of 1899.

=== Modern history ===
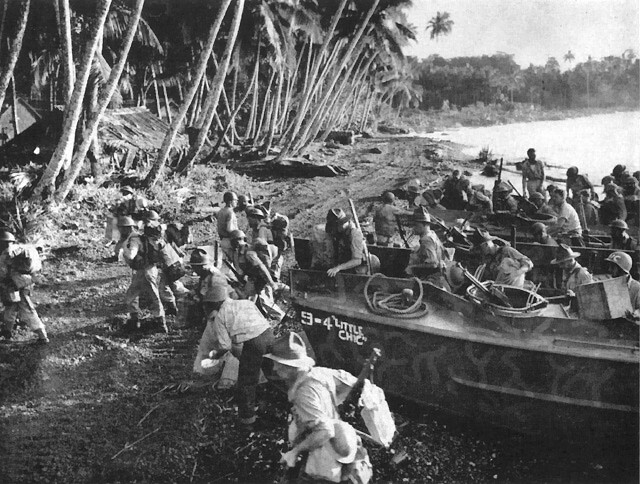
New Zealand troops land on Vella Lavella, in Solomon Islands

One of the first land offensives in Oceania was the occupation of German Samoa in August 1914 by New Zealand forces. The campaign to take Samoa ended without bloodshed after over 1,000 New Zealanders landed on the German colony. Australian forces attacked German New Guinea in September 1914. A company of Australians and a British warship besieged the Germans and their colonial subjects, ending with a German surrender.

The attack on Pearl Harbor by the Japanese Imperial General Headquarters, was a surprise military strike conducted by the Imperial Japanese Navy against the United States naval base at Pearl Harbor, Hawaii, on the morning of 7 December 1941. The attack led to the United States' entry into World War II. The Japanese subsequently invaded New Guinea, the Solomon Islands, and other Pacific islands. The Japanese were turned back at the Battle of the Coral Sea and the Kokoda Track campaign before they were finally defeated in 1945. Some of the most prominent Oceanic battlegrounds were the Battle of Bita Paka, the Solomon Islands campaign, the Air raids on Darwin, the Kokoda Track, and the Borneo campaign. The United States fought the Battle of Guam from 21 July to 10 August 1944, to recapture the island from Japanese military occupation.

Australia and New Zealand became dominions in the 20th century, adopting the Statute of Westminster Act in 1942 and 1947, respectively. In 1946, Polynesians were granted French citizenship, and the islands' status was changed to an overseas territory; the islands' name was changed in 1957 to Polynésie Française (French Polynesia). Hawaii became a U.S. state in 1959. Fiji and Tonga became independent in 1970. On 1 May 1979, in recognition of the evolving political status of the Marshall Islands, the United States recognised the constitution of the Marshall Islands and the establishment of the government of the Republic of the Marshall Islands. The South Pacific Forum was founded in 1971, and it became the Pacific Islands Forum in 2000.

== Geography ==
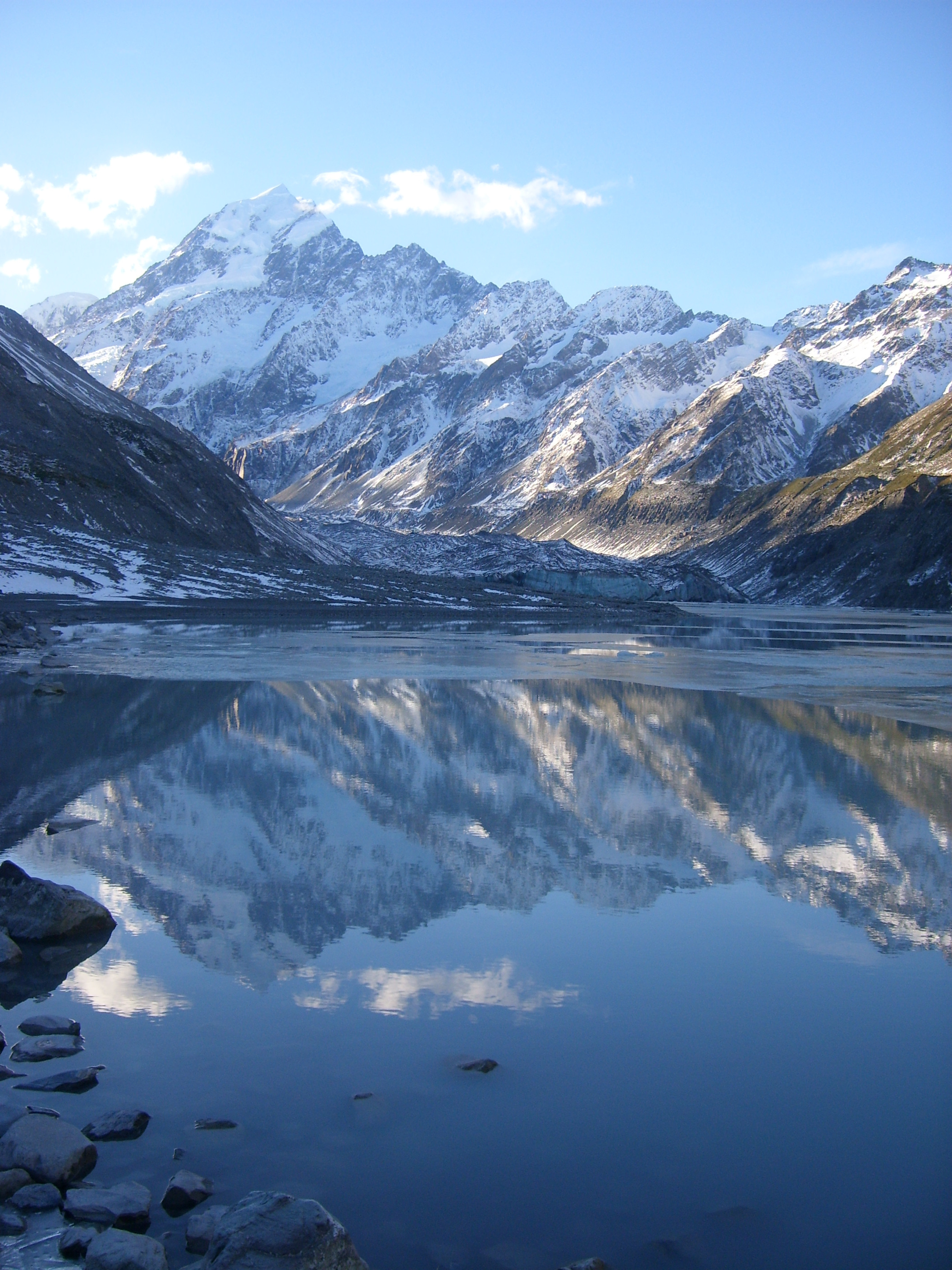
Aoraki / Mount Cook, located on the South Island of New Zealand

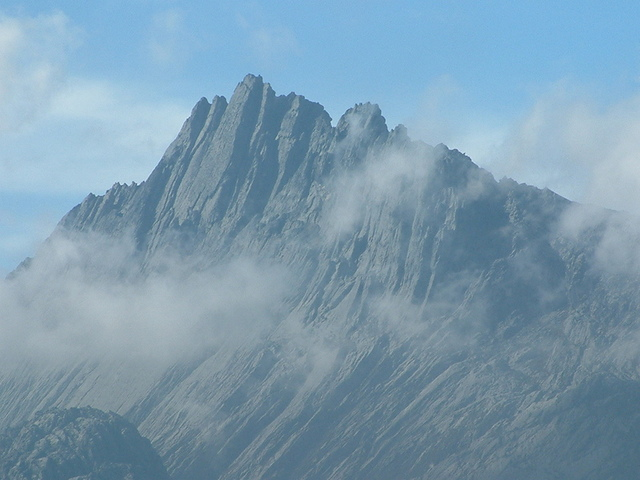
Puncak Jaya / Carstensz Pyramid, highest summit in Oceania

Under a four subregion model, the islands of Oceania extend to New Guinea in the west, the Bonin Islands in the northwest, the Hawaiian Islands in the northeast, Easter Island and Sala y Gómez Island in the east, and Macquarie Island in the south. Excluded under most definitions of Oceania are the Pacific landmasses of Taiwan, the Ryukyu Islands, and the Japanese archipelago, which are all on the margins of Asia, as well as the Aleutian Islands and other Alaskan or Canadian islands. In its periphery, Oceania's islands would sprawl 28 degrees north to the Bonin Islands in the Northern Hemisphere, and 55 degrees south to Macquarie Island in the Southern Hemisphere.

Oceanian islands are of four basic types: continental islands, high islands, coral reefs, and uplifted coral platforms. High islands are of volcanic origin, and many contain active volcanoes. Among these are Bougainville, Hawaiʻi, and the Solomon Islands.

Oceania is one of eight terrestrial biogeographic realms, which constitute the major ecological regions of the planet. Related to these concepts are Near Oceania, that part of western Island Melanesia which has been inhabited for tens of millennia, and Remote Oceania, which is more recently settled. Although the majority of the Oceanian islands lie in the South Pacific, a few of them are not restricted to the Pacific Ocean – Kangaroo Island and Ashmore and Cartier Islands, for instance, are situated in the Southern Ocean and Indian Ocean, respectively, and Tasmania's west coast faces the Southern Ocean. The coral reefs of the South Pacific are low-lying structures that have built up on basaltic lava flows under the ocean's surface. One of the most dramatic is the Great Barrier Reef off northeastern Australia, with chains of reef patches. A second island type formed of coral is the uplifted coral platform, which is usually slightly larger than the low coral islands. Examples include Banaba (formerly Ocean Island) and Makatea in the Tuamotu group of French Polynesia.

=== Regions ===
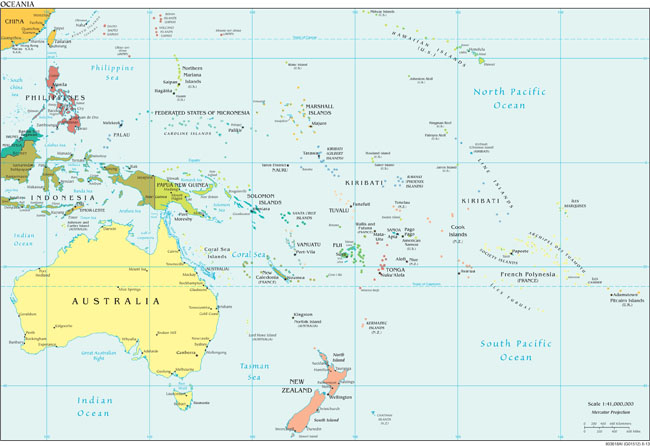
A map of Oceania from the CIA World Factbook

Micronesia, which lies north of the equator and west of the International Date Line, includes the Mariana Islands in the northwest, the Caroline Islands in the centre, the Marshall Islands to the west and the islands of Kiribati in the southeast.

Melanesia, to the southwest, includes New Guinea, the world's second largest island after Greenland and by far the largest of the Pacific islands. The other main Melanesian groups from north to south are the Bismarck Archipelago, the Solomon Islands, the Santa Cruz Islands, Vanuatu, Fiji, and New Caledonia.

Polynesia, stretching from Hawaii in the north to New Zealand in the south, also encompasses Tuvalu, Tokelau, Samoa, Tonga, and the Kermadec Islands to the west, the Cook Islands, Society Islands and Austral Islands in the centre, and the Marquesas Islands, the Tuamotus, Mangareva Islands, and Easter Island to the east.

Australasia comprises Australia, New Zealand, and neighbouring islands in the Pacific Ocean. Along with India, most of Australasia lies on the Indo-Australian Plate, with the latter occupying the Southern area. It is flanked by the Indian Ocean to the west and the Southern Ocean to the south.

=== Geology ===
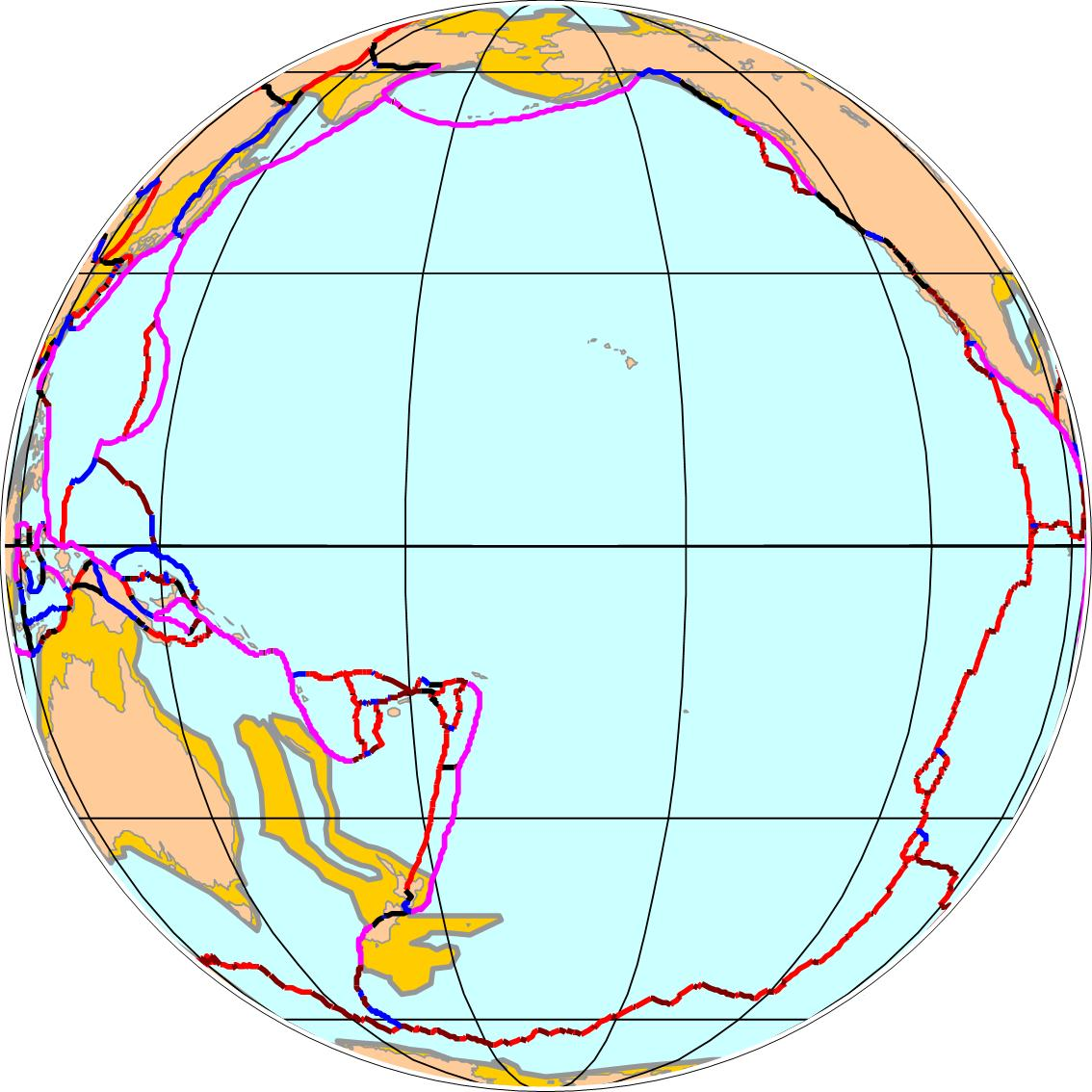
The Pacific Plate comprises most of Oceania, excluding Australasia and the western portion of Melanesia.

The Pacific Plate, which makes up most of Oceania, is an oceanic tectonic plate that lies beneath the Pacific Ocean. At 103 million square kilometres (40,000,000 sq mi), it is the largest tectonic plate. The plate contains an interior hot spot forming the Hawaiian Islands. It is almost entirely oceanic crust. The oldest member disappearing by way of the plate tectonics cycle is early-Cretaceous (145 to 137 million years ago).

Australia became part of the Indo-Australian Plate 45 to 40 million years ago, and this is in the process of separating again, with the Australian Plate being relevant to Oceania. It is the lowest, flattest, and oldest landmass on Earth, and it has had a relatively stable geological history. Geological forces such as tectonic uplift of mountain ranges or clashes between tectonic plates occurred mainly in Australia's early history, when it was still a part of Gondwana. Australia is situated in the middle of the tectonic plate, has occasional mid-sized earthquakes, and currently has no active volcanism (but some volcanoes in southeast Australia erupted within the last 10,000 years).

The geology of New Zealand is noted for its volcanic activity, earthquakes, and geothermal areas because of its position on the boundary of the Australian and Pacific Plates. Much of the basement rock of New Zealand was once part of the supercontinent of Gondwana, along with South America, Africa, Madagascar, India, Antarctica, and Australia. The rocks that now form the continent of Zealandia were nestled between Eastern Australia and Western Antarctica.

The Australia-New Zealand continental fragment of Gondwana split from the rest of Gondwana in the late Cretaceous epoch (95–90 Ma). By 75 Ma, Zealandia was essentially separate from Australia and Antarctica, although only shallow seas might have separated Zealandia and Australia in the north. The Tasman Sea, and part of Zealandia, then locked together with Australia to form the Australian Plate (40 Ma), and a new plate boundary was created between the Australian and Pacific Plates.

Most islands in the Pacific are high islands (volcanic islands), such as Easter Island, American Samoa, and Fiji, among others, having peaks up to 1300 m rising abruptly from the shore. The Northwestern Hawaiian Islands were formed c. 7 to 30 million years ago, as shield volcanoes over the same volcanic hotspot that formed the Emperor Seamounts to the north and the Main Hawaiian Islands to the south. Hawaii's tallest mountain, Mauna Kea, is 4,205 m (13,796 ft) above mean sea level.

=== Flora ===
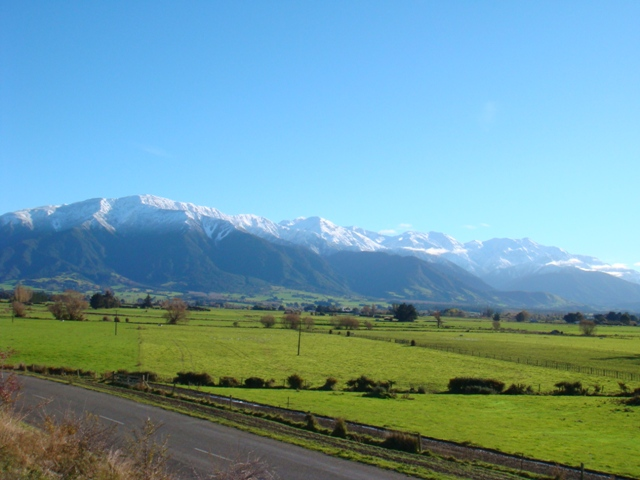
New Zealand countryside

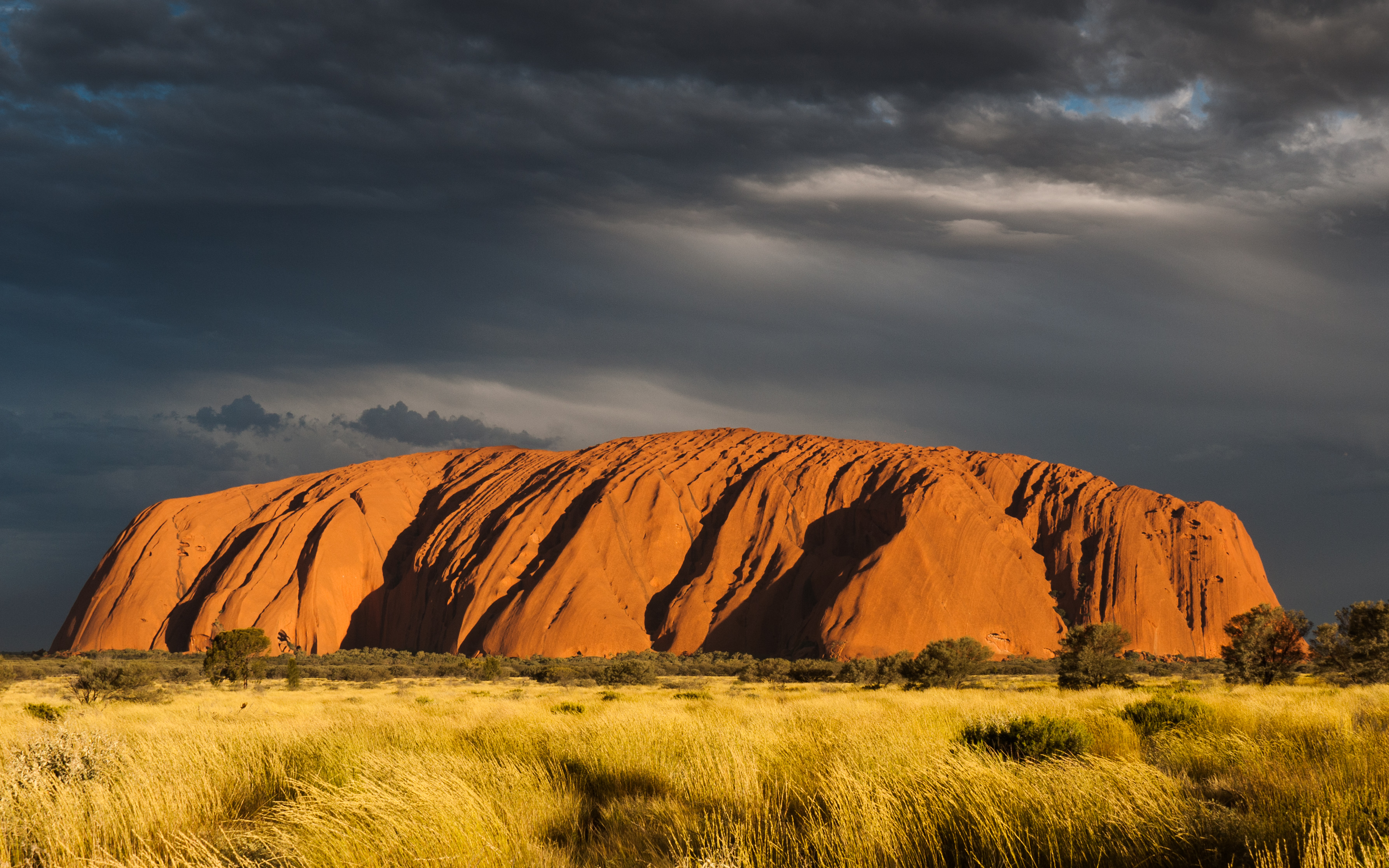
Uluru (Ayers Rock) in Central Australia

The most diverse country of Oceania when it comes to the environment is Australia, with tropical rainforests in the north-east, mountain ranges in the south-east, south-west, and east, and a desert in the centre. Desert or semi-arid land, commonly known as the outback, makes up by far the largest portion of land. The coastal uplands and a belt of Brigalow grasslands lie between the coast and the mountains, while inland of the dividing range are large areas of grassland. The northernmost point of the east coast is the tropical-rainforested Cape York Peninsula.

Prominent features of the Australian flora are adaptations to aridity and fire, which include scleromorphy and serotiny. These adaptations are common in species from the large and well-known families Proteaceae (Banksia), Myrtaceae (Eucalyptus – gum trees), and Fabaceae (Acacia – wattle). The flora of Fiji, Solomon Islands, Vanuatu, and New Caledonia is tropical dry forest, with tropical vegetation that includes palm trees, Premna protrusa, Psydrax odorata, Gyrocarpus americanus, and Derris trifoliata.

New Zealand's landscape ranges from the fjord-like sounds of the southwest to the tropical beaches of the far north. The South Island is dominated by the Southern Alps. There are 18 peaks of more than 3000 metres (9800 ft) in the South Island. All summits over 2,900 m are within the Southern Alps, a chain that forms the backbone of the South Island; the highest peak of which is Aoraki / Mount Cook, at 3,754 metres (12,316 ft). Earthquakes are common, though usually not severe, averaging 3,000 per year. There is a wide variety of native trees, adapted to all the various microclimates in New Zealand.

In Hawaii, one endemic plant, Brighamia, now requires hand-pollination because its natural pollinator is presumed to be extinct. The two species of Brighamia – B. rockii and B. insignis – are represented in the wild by around 120 individual plants. To ensure these plants set seed, biologists rappel down 910-metre (3,000 ft) cliffs to brush pollen onto their stigmas.

The area of primary forest decreased in Oceania by 17 000 hectares per year in 1990–2000, 25 600 ha per year in 2000–2015 and 20 200 ha per year in 2015–2025.

=== Fauna ===
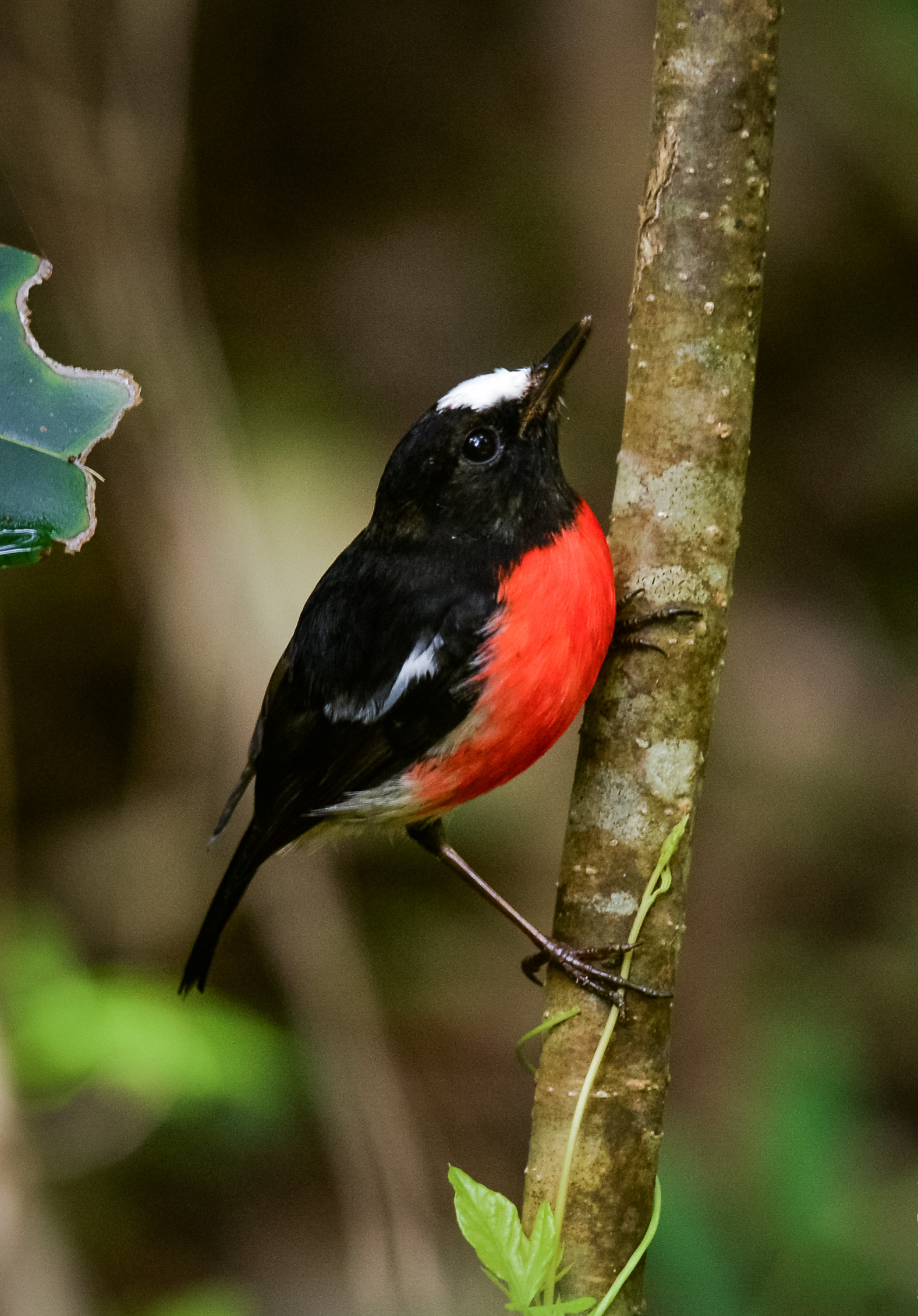
The Pacific robin inhabits the islands of the south-western Pacific.

The aptly named Pacific kingfisher is found in the Pacific Islands, as is the Red-vented bulbul, Polynesian starling, Brown goshawk, Pacific Swallow and the Cardinal myzomela, among others. Birds breeding on Pitcairn include the fairy tern, common noddy, and red-tailed tropicbird. The Pitcairn reed warbler, endemic to Pitcairn Island, was added to the endangered species list in 2008.

Native to Hawaii is the Hawaiian crow, which has been extinct in the wild since 2002. The brown tree snake is native to the northern and eastern coasts of Australia, Papua New Guinea, Guam, and the Solomon Islands. Native to Australia, New Guinea and proximate islands are birds of paradise, honeyeaters, Australasian treecreepers, Australasian robins, kingfishers, butcherbirds, and bowerbirds.

A unique feature of Australia's fauna is the relative scarcity of native placental mammals, and dominance of the marsupials – a group of mammals that raise their young in a pouch, including the macropods, possums, and dasyuromorphs. The passerines of Australia, also known as songbirds or perching birds, include wrens, the magpie group, thornbills, corvids, pardalotes and lyrebirds. Predominant bird species in the country include the Australian magpie, Australian raven, the pied currawong, crested pigeons and the laughing kookaburra. The koala, emu, platypus and kangaroo are national animals of Australia, and the Tasmanian devil is also one of the well-known animals in the country. The goanna is a predatory lizard native to the Australian mainland.

The birds of New Zealand evolved into an avifauna that included a large number of endemic species. As an island archipelago, New Zealand accumulated bird diversity, and when Captain James Cook arrived in the 1770s, he noted that the bird song was deafening. The mix includes species with unusual biology, such as the kākāpō, which is the world's only flightless, nocturnal, lek-breeding parrot, but also many species that are similar to neighbouring land areas. Some of the more well-known and distinctive bird species in New Zealand are the kiwi, kea, takahē, kākāpō, mohua, tūī, and the bellbird. The tuatara is a notable reptile endemic to New Zealand.

Australia, New Zealand, New Guinea, Wallacea, and the islands of the Pacific Ocean collectively possess 42% of the world's parrot species, including half of all Critically Endangered parrots, many of which are endemic to the region.

=== Climate ===
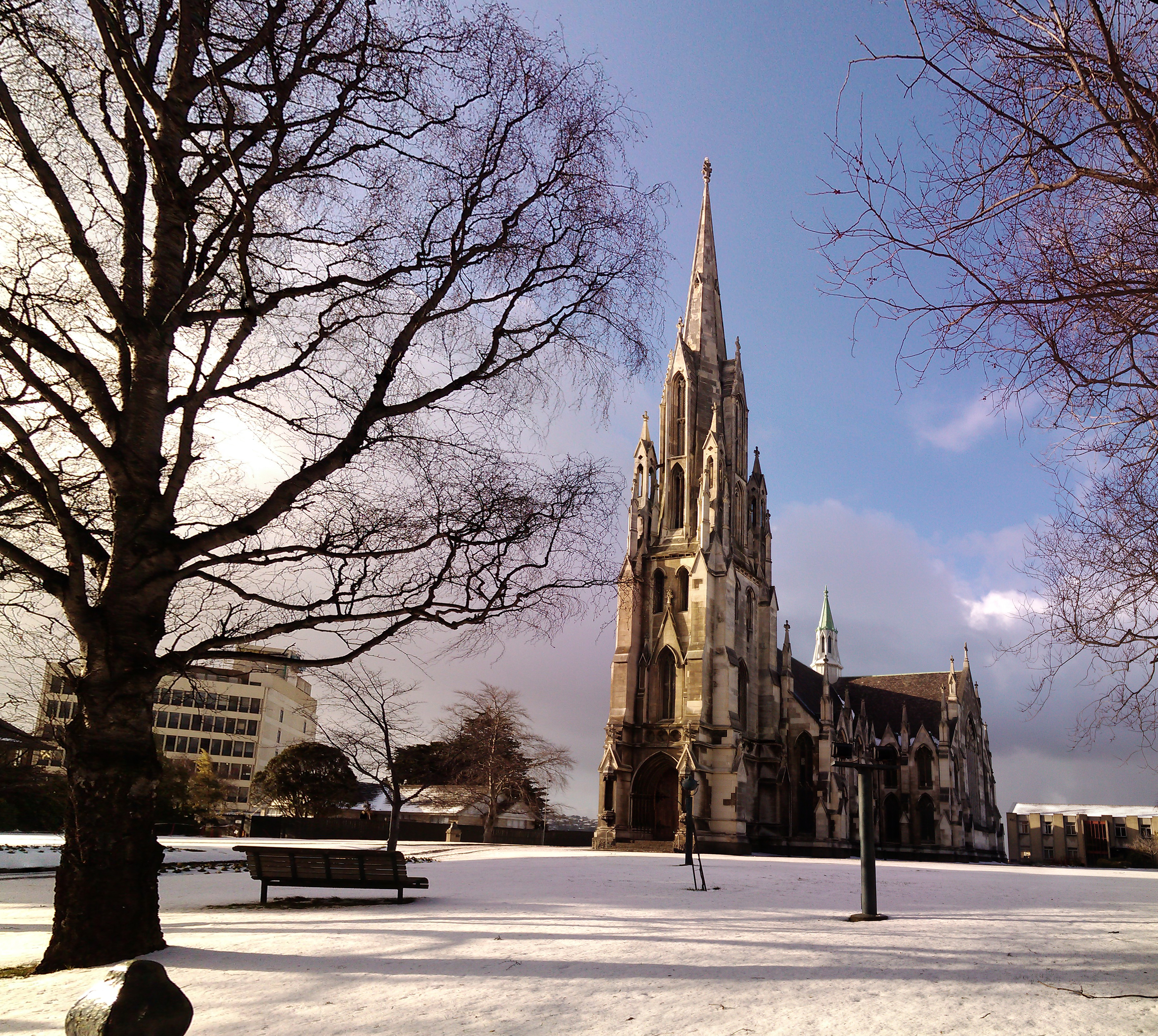
August 2011 winter's snowfall in Dunedin, Otago

The Pacific Islands are ruled by a tropical rainforest and tropical savanna climate. In the tropical and subtropical Pacific, the El Niño Southern Oscillation (ENSO) affects weather conditions. In the tropical western Pacific, the monsoon and the related wet season during the summer months contrast with dry winds in the winter, which blow over the ocean from the Asian landmass. November is the only month in which all the tropical cyclone basins are active.

To the southwest of the region, in the Australian landmass, the climate is mostly desert or semi-arid, with the southern coastal corners having a temperate climate, such as oceanic and humid subtropical climate on the east coast and Mediterranean climate in the west. The northern parts of the country have a tropical climate. Snow falls frequently on the highlands near the east coast, in the states of Victoria, New South Wales, Tasmania and in the Australian Capital Territory.

Most regions of New Zealand belong to the temperate zone with a maritime climate (Köppen climate classification: Cfb) characterised by four distinct seasons. Conditions vary from extremely wet on the West Coast of the South Island to almost semi-arid in Central Otago and subtropical in Northland. Snow falls in New Zealand's South Island and at higher altitudes in the North Island. It is extremely rare at sea level in the North Island.

Hawaii, although being in the tropics, experiences many different climates, depending on latitude and its geography. The island of Hawaii, for example, hosts 4 (out of 5 in total) climate groups on a surface as small as 10,430 km^{2} (4,028 sq mi) according to the Köppen climate types: tropical, arid, temperate, and polar. The Hawaiian Islands receive most of their precipitation during the winter months (October to April). A few islands in the northwest, such as Guam, are susceptible to typhoons in the wet season.

The highest recorded temperature in Oceania occurred in Oodnadatta, South Australia (2 January 1960) and in Onslow, Western Australia (13 January 2022), both of which recorded a Temperature of 50.7 °C (123.3 °F). The lowest temperature ever recorded in Oceania was −25.6 °C (−14.1 °F), at Ranfurly in Otago in 1903, with a more recent temperature of −21.6 °C (−6.9 °F) recorded in 1995 in nearby Ophir. Pohnpei of the Senyavin Islands in Micronesia is the wettest settlement in Oceania, and one of the wettest places on Earth, with annual recorded rainfall exceeding 7,600 mm (300 in) each year in certain mountainous locations. The Big Bog on the island of Maui is the wettest place, receiving an average of 10,271 mm (404.4 in) each year.

Köppen climate classification of selected regions in Oceania
Australia

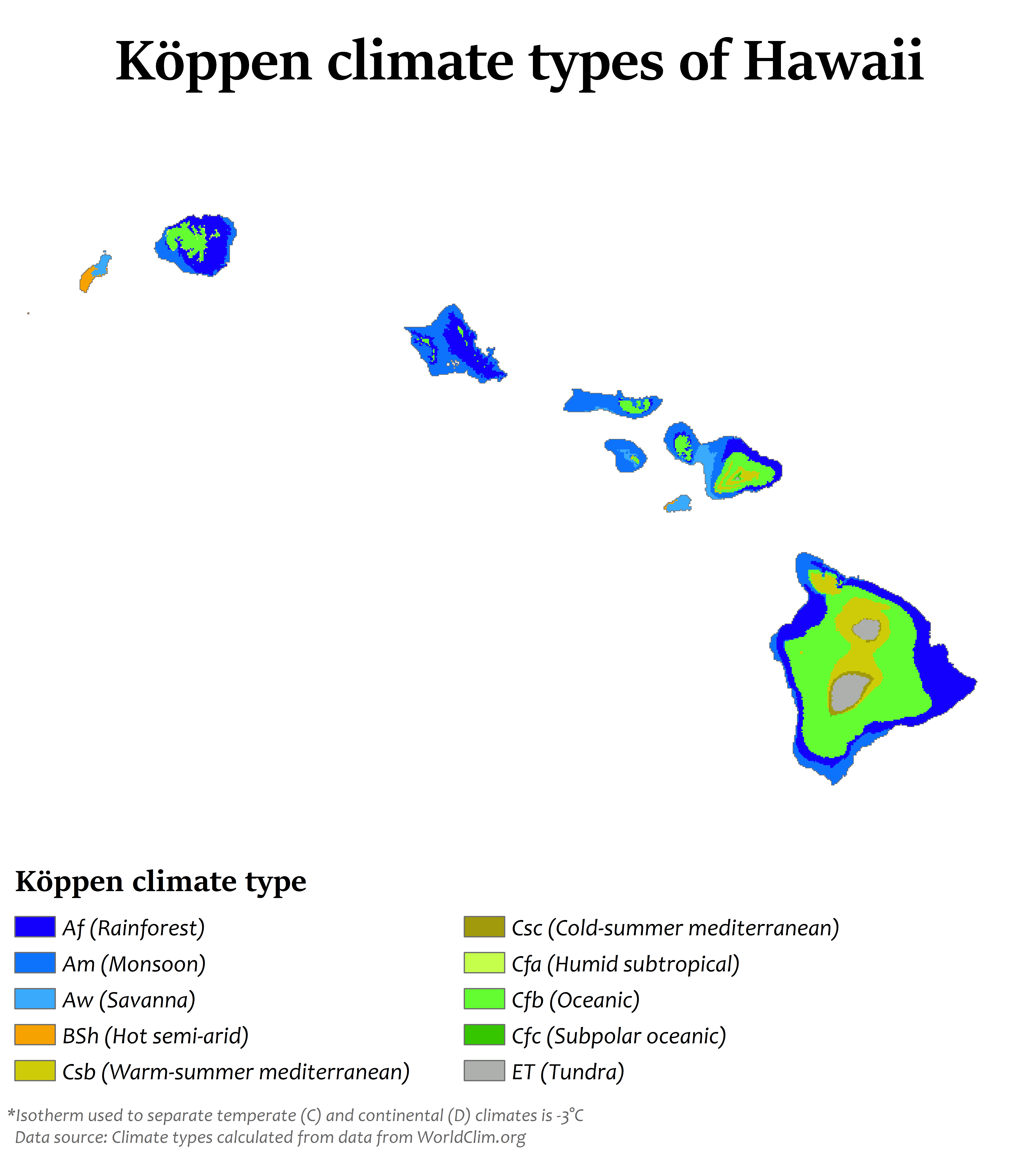
Hawaii

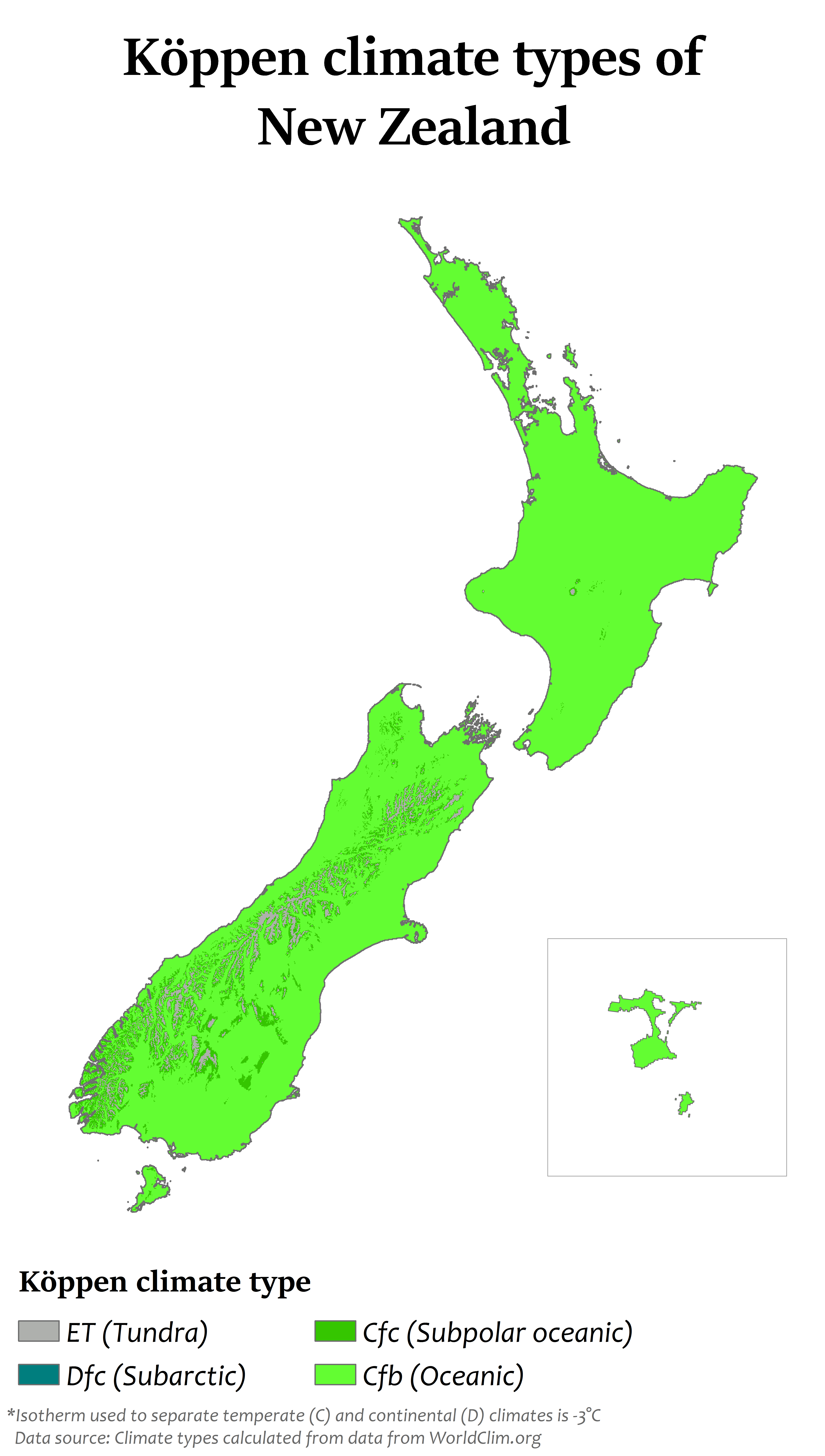
New Zealand

Papua New Guinea

Australasia and adjacent islands

==== Climate change ====
Climate change is affecting many parts of Oceania, especially the small island countries in the Pacific Ocean. Rising sea levels increase the risk of coastal flooding and erosion, which can damage homes, roads and other infrastructure. According to the World Meteorological Organization, sea levels in the South-West Pacific are rising faster than the global average. This is a major concern for low-lying islands and coastal communities.

Ocean warming is another important problem in the region. Marine heatwaves have become more frequent and intense, affecting coral reefs and marine ecosystems. Warmer ocean temperatures can cause coral bleaching, while ocean acidification can make it harder for corals to grow. These changes ca affect fishing, tourism and the livelihoods of people who dependent on the ocean.

== Politics ==
=== Australia ===
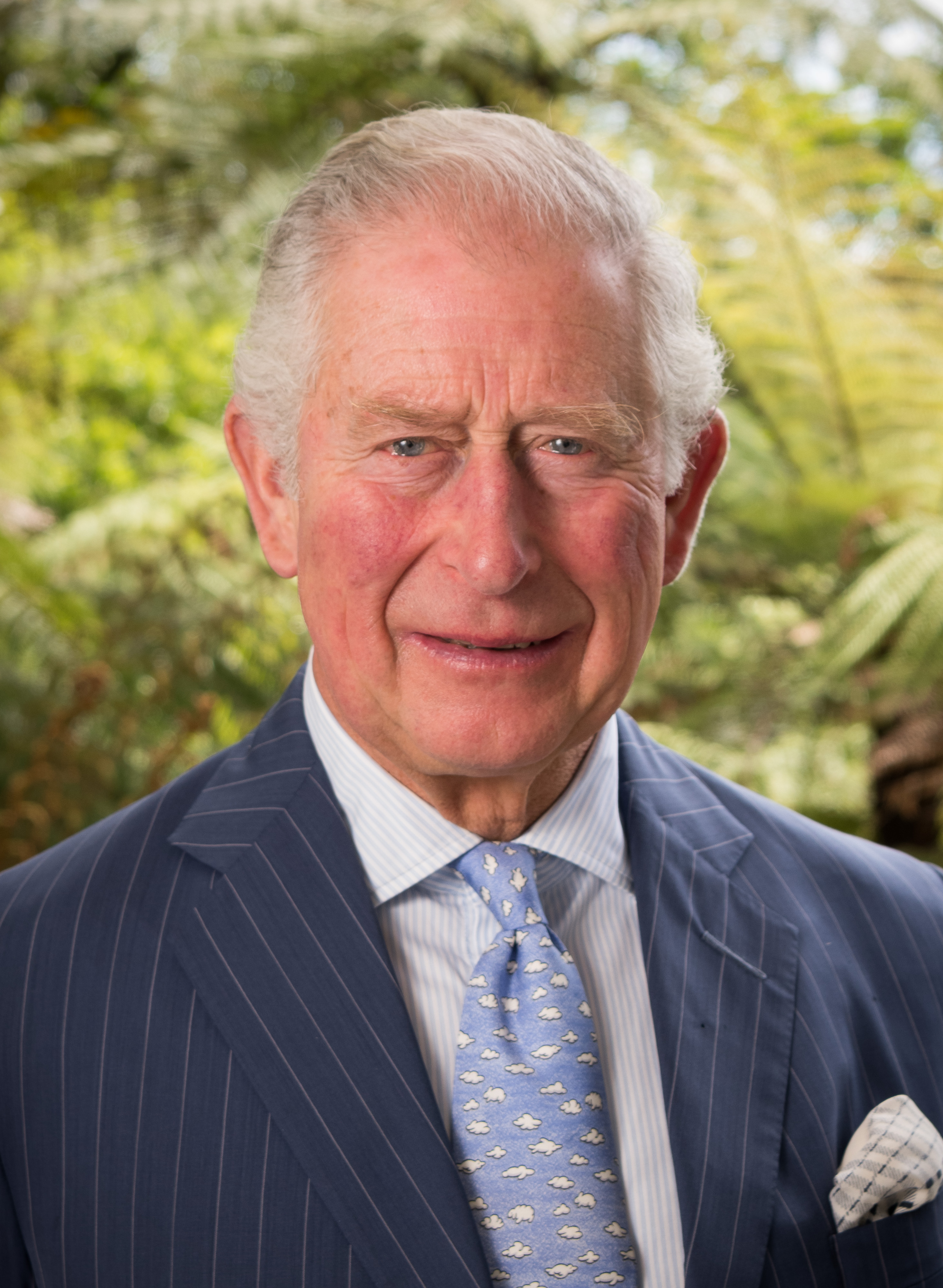
Charles is Head of the Commonwealth and King of five Oceanian countries: Australia, New Zealand, Papua New Guinea, Solomon Islands, and Tuvalu.

Australia is a federal parliamentary constitutional monarchy with Charles III at its apex as the King of Australia, a role that is distinct from his position as monarch of the other Commonwealth realms. The King is represented in Australia by the Governor-General at the federal level and by the Governors at the state level, who by convention act on the advice of his ministers. There are two major political groups that usually form government, federally and in the states: the Australian Labor Party and the Coalition, which is a formal grouping of the Liberal Party and its minor partner, the National Party. Within Australian political culture, the Coalition is considered centre-right, and the Labor Party is considered centre-left. The Australian Defence Force is by far the largest military force in Oceania.

=== New Zealand ===
New Zealand is a constitutional monarchy with a parliamentary democracy, although its constitution is not codified. Charles III is the King of New Zealand and the head of state. The King is represented by the Governor-General, whom he appoints on the advice of the Prime Minister. The New Zealand Parliament holds legislative power and consists of the King and the House of Representatives. A parliamentary general election must be called no later than three years after the previous election. New Zealand is identified as one of the world's most stable and well-governed states, with high government transparency and among the lowest perceived levels of corruption.

=== Pacific Islands ===
Government building in the Samoan capital Apia housing administrative ministerial offices

In Samoan politics, the Prime Minister of Samoa is the head of government. The 1960 constitution, which formally came into force with independence from New Zealand in 1962, builds on the British pattern of parliamentary democracy, modified to take account of Samoan customs. The national government (malo) generally controls the legislative assembly. Politics of Tonga takes place in a framework of a constitutional monarchy, whereby the King of Tonga is the Head of State.

Fiji has a multiparty system with the Prime Minister of Fiji as head of government. The executive power is exercised by the government. Legislative power is vested in both the government and the Parliament of Fiji. Fiji's Head of State is the President.

In the politics of Papua New Guinea, the Prime Minister is the head of government, and the head of state is the monarch of the United Kingdom, represented by a Governor-General. In Kiribati, a parliamentary regime, the President of Kiribati is the head of state and government, and the country has a multi-party system.

New Caledonia remains an integral part of the French Republic. Inhabitants of New Caledonia are French citizens. New Caledonia sends two representatives to the French National Assembly and two senators to the French Senate.

Hawaii is dominated by the Democratic Party. As codified in the Hawaiian Constitution, there are three branches of government: executive, legislative, and judicial. The governor is elected statewide.

== Economy ==
The linked map below shows the exclusive economic zones (EEZs) of the islands of Oceania and neighbouring areas, as a guide to the following table (few land boundaries can be drawn on a map of the Pacific at this scale).

=== Australia ===
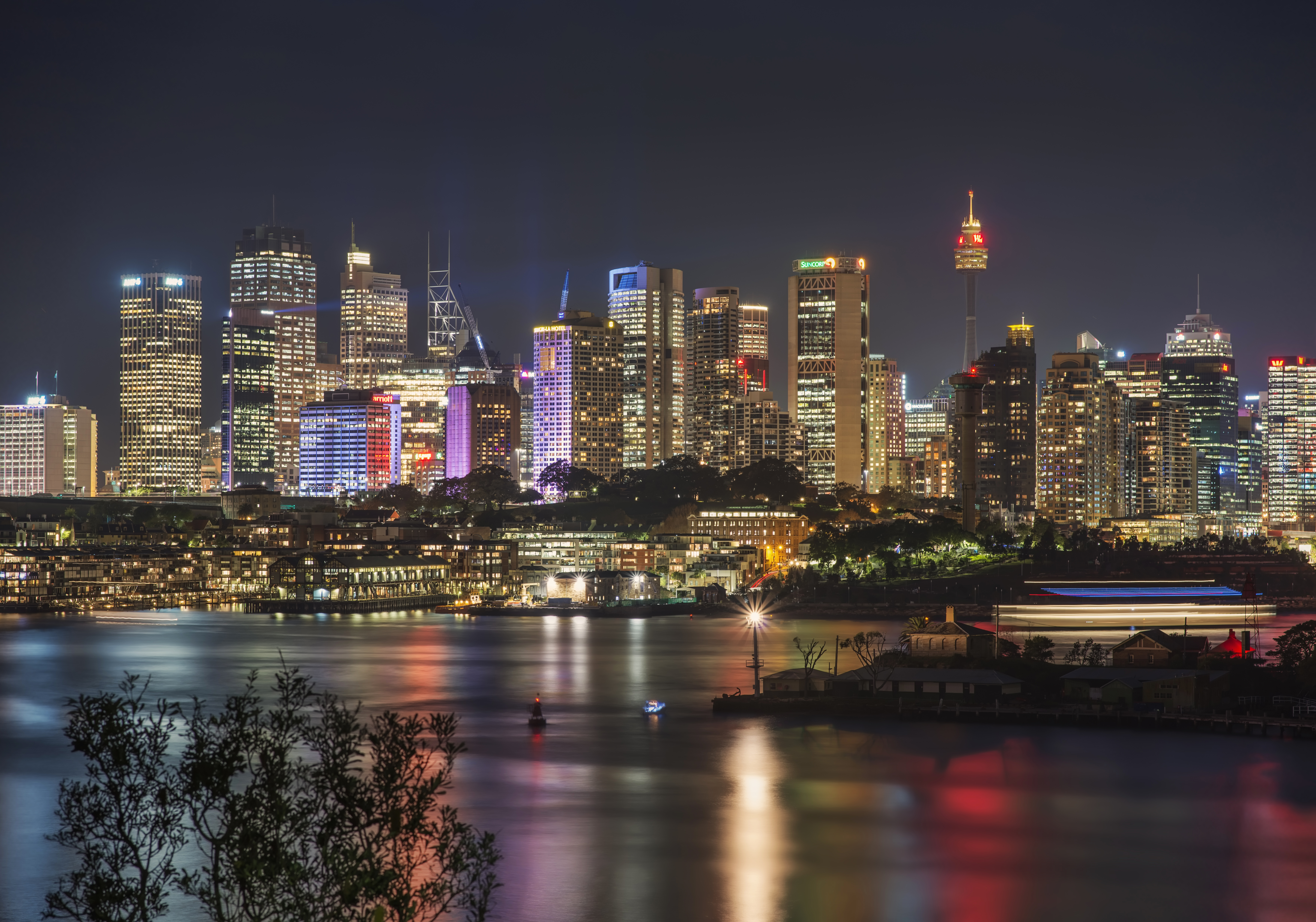
The skyline of Sydney

Australia and New Zealand are the only highly developed independent nations in the region, although the economy of Australia is by far the largest and most dominant economy in the region and one of the largest in the world. New Caledonia, Hawaiʻi ʻi, and French Polynesia are highly developed too, but are not sovereign states. Australia's per-capita GDP is higher than that of the UK, Canada, Germany, and France in terms of purchasing power parity. New Zealand is also one of the most globalised economies and depends greatly on international trade.

The Australian Securities Exchange in Sydney is the largest stock exchange in Australia and in the South Pacific. In 2012, Australia was the 12th largest national economy by nominal GDP and the 19th-largest measured by PPP-adjusted GDP.

Mercer Quality of Living Survey ranks Sydney tenth in the world in terms of quality of living, making it one of the most livable cities. It is classified as an Alpha World City by GaWC. Melbourne also ranked highly in the world's most liveable city list, and is a leading financial centre in the Asia–Pacific region.

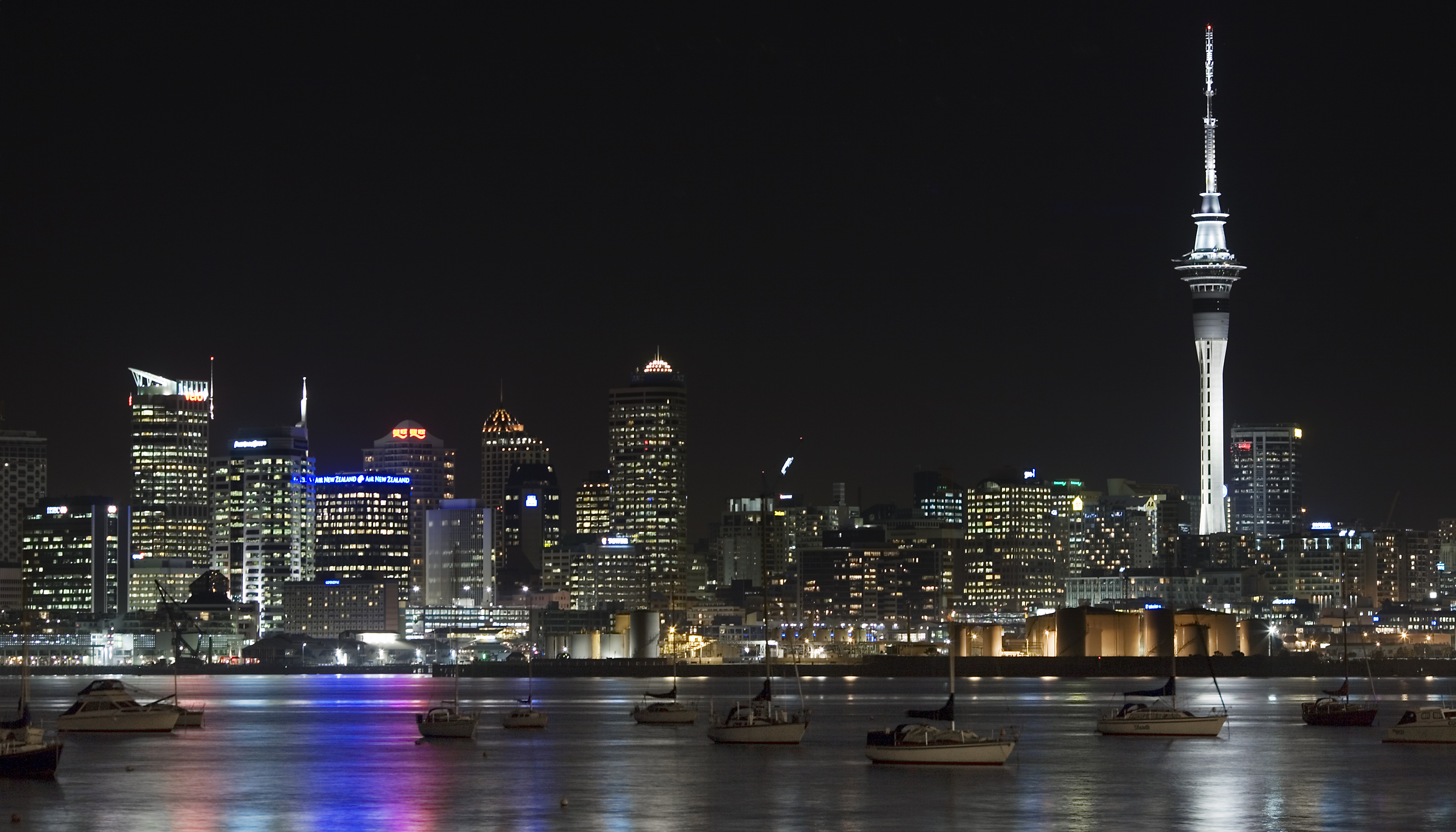
Auckland's central business district at night in 2006

The majority of people living in Australia work in health care, retail and education sectors. Australia boasts the largest amount of manufacturing in the region, producing cars, electrical equipment, machinery and clothes.

=== New Zealand ===
New Zealand's economy is the 53rd-largest in the world measured by nominal gross domestic product (GDP) and 68th-largest in the world measured by purchasing power parity (PPP). A major economic and cultural powerhouse of the Southern Hemisphere, Auckland is ranked as a Beta+ world city by the Globalization and World Cities Research Network. Auckland and Wellington are frequently ranked among the world's most liveable cities, with Auckland being ranked first in the world according to the Global Liveability Ranking.

New Zealand has a large GDP for its population of 5.2 million, and sources of revenue are spread throughout the large island nation. The country has one of the most globalised economies and depends greatly on international trade – mainly with Australia, Canada, China, the European Union, Japan, Singapore, South Korea and the United States. New Zealand's 1983 Closer Economic Relations agreement with Australia means that the economy aligns closely with that of Australia. In 2005, the World Bank praised New Zealand as the most business-friendly country in the world. The economy diversified and by 2008, tourism had become the single biggest generator of foreign exchange. The New Zealand dollar is the 10th-most traded currency in the world.

=== Pacific Islands ===
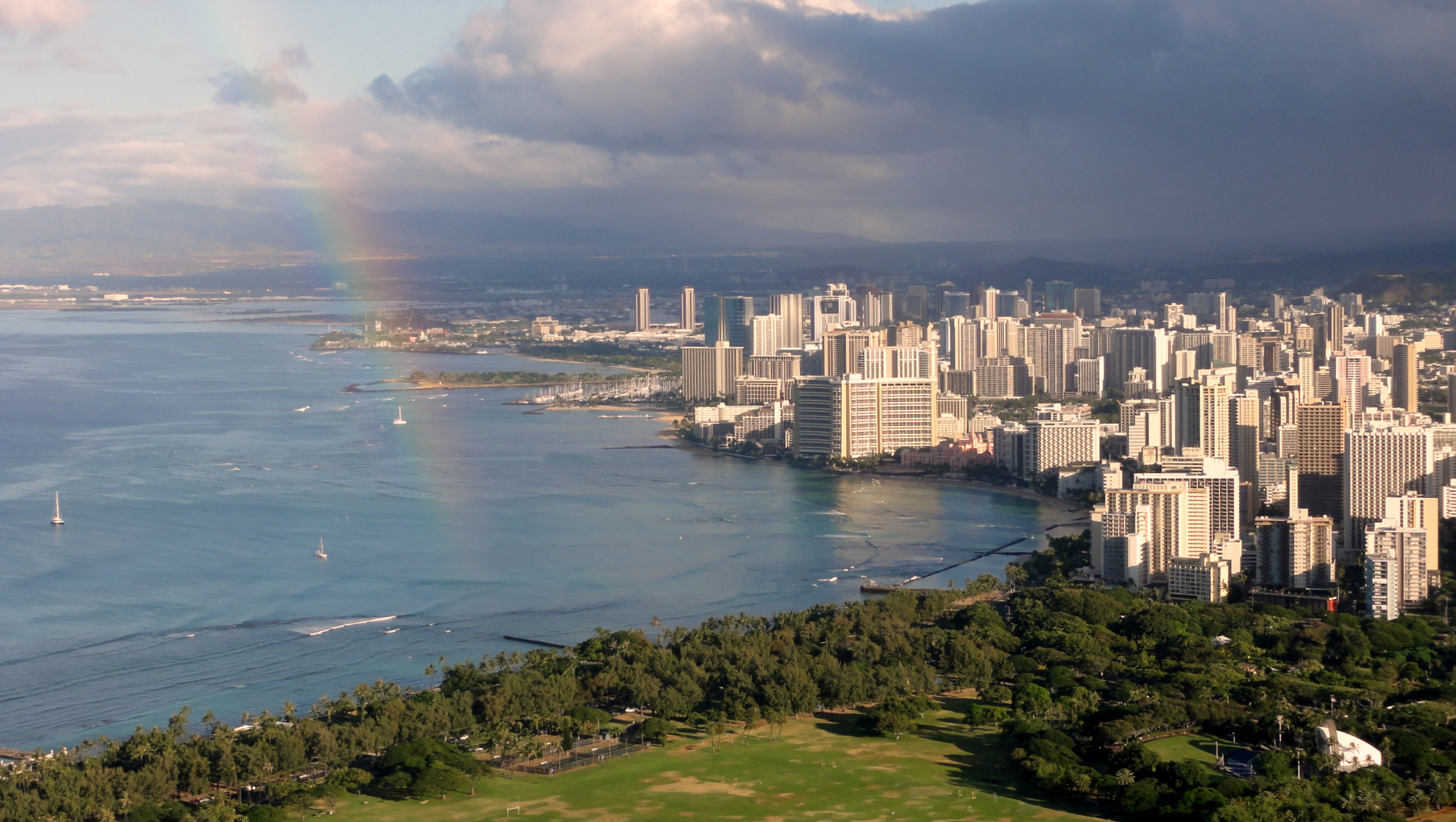
Honolulu viewed from Diamond Head crater

The overwhelming majority of people living in the Pacific islands work in the service industry, which includes tourism, education, and financial services. Oceania's largest export markets include Japan, China, the United States, and South Korea. The smallest Pacific nations rely on trade with Australia, New Zealand, and the United States for exporting goods and for accessing other products. Australia and New Zealand's trading arrangements are known as Closer Economic Relations. Australia and New Zealand, along with other countries, are members of Asia–Pacific Economic Cooperation (APEC) and the East Asia Summit (EAS), which may become trade blocs in the future, particularly EAS.

The main produce from the Pacific is copra or coconut, but timber, beef, palm oil, cocoa, sugar, and ginger are also commonly grown across the tropics of the Pacific. Fishing provides a major industry for many of the smaller nations in the Pacific, although many fishing areas are exploited by other larger countries, namely Japan. Natural Resources, such as lead, zinc, nickel, and gold, are mined in Australia and the Solomon Islands. Oceania's largest export markets include Japan, China, the United States, India, South Korea, and the European Union.

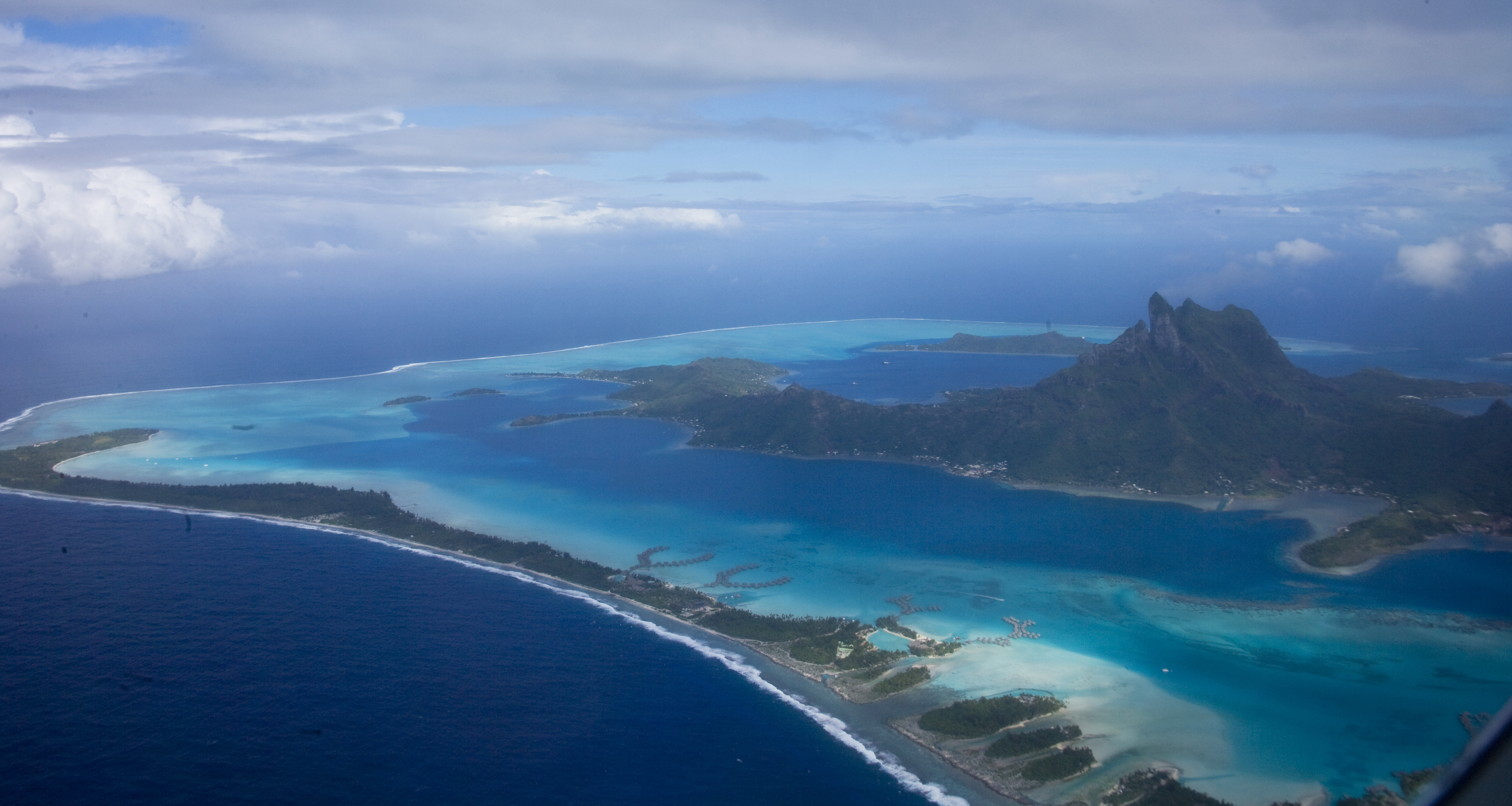
Aerial view of Bora Bora, French Polynesia

Endowed with forest, mineral, and fish resources, Fiji is one of the most developed of the Pacific island economies, though it remains a developing country with a large subsistence agriculture sector. Agriculture accounts for 18% of gross domestic product, although it employed some 70% of the workforce as of 2001. Sugar exports and the growing tourist industry are the major sources of foreign exchange. Sugar cane processing makes up one-third of industrial activity. Coconuts, ginger, and copra are also significant.

The history of Hawaii's economy can be traced through a succession of dominant industries: sandalwood, whaling, sugarcane, pineapple, the military, tourism, and education. Hawaiian exports include food and clothing. These industries play a small role in the Hawaiian economy, due to the shipping distance to viable markets, such as the West Coast of the contiguous U.S. The state's food exports include coffee, macadamia nuts, pineapple, livestock, sugarcane, and honey. As of 2015, Honolulu was ranked high on world livability rankings, and was also ranked as the 2nd safest city in the U.S.

=== Tourism ===
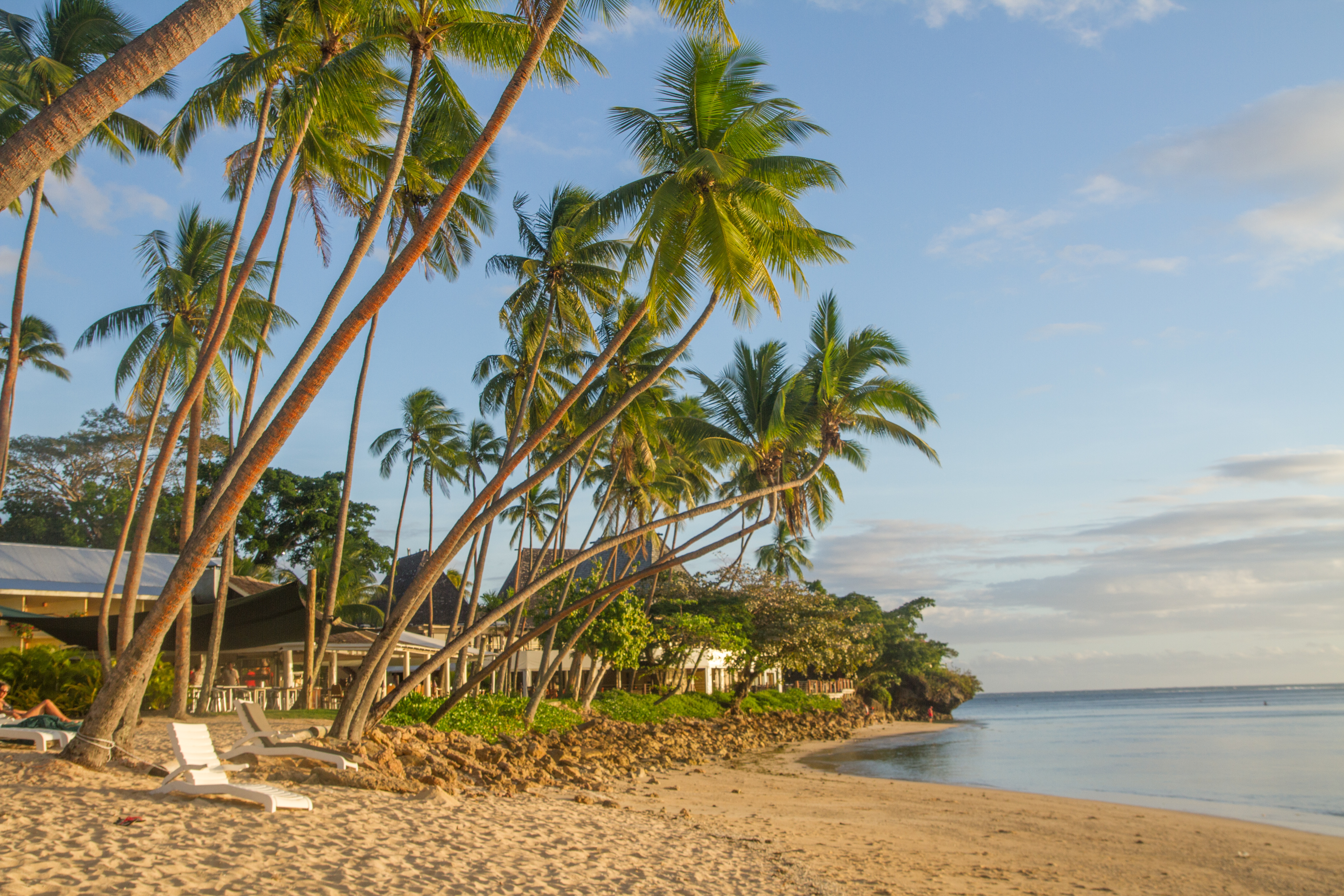
Shangri-La's Fijian Resort

Tourists mostly come from Japan, the United Kingdom, and the United States. Fiji currently attracts almost half a million tourists each year, more than a quarter of whom come from Australia. This has contributed $1 billion or more to Fiji's economy since 1995, but the Government of Fiji likely underestimates these figures due to the invisible economy inside the tourism industry.

Vanuatu is widely recognised as one of the premier vacation destinations for scuba divers wishing to explore coral reefs of the South Pacific region. Tourism has been promoted, in part, by Vanuatu being the site of several reality-TV shows. The ninth season of the reality TV series Survivor was filmed in Vanuatu, entitled Survivor: Vanuatu – Islands of Fire. Two years later, Australia's Celebrity Survivor was filmed at the same location used by the U.S. version.

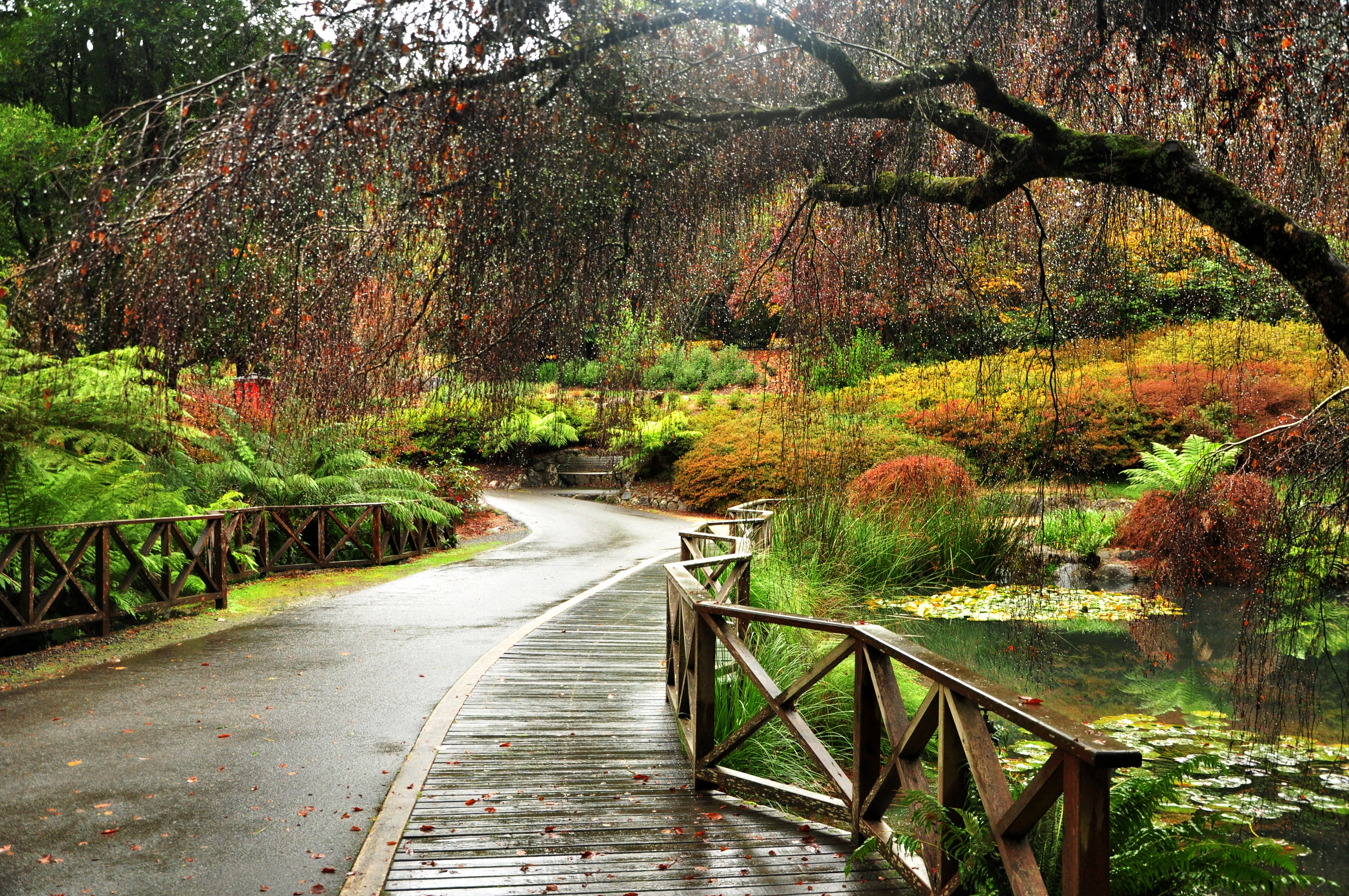
Dandenong Ranges in Victoria are popular among tourists.

Tourism in Australia is an important component of the Australian economy. In the financial year 2014/15, tourism represented 3% of Australia's GDP, contributing A$47.5 billion to the national economy. In 2015, there were 7.4 million visitor arrivals. Popular Australian destinations include Sydney Harbour (Sydney Opera House, Sydney Harbour Bridge, Royal Botanic Garden, etc.), Gold Coast (theme parks such as Warner Bros. Movie World, Dreamworld and Sea World), Walls of Jerusalem National Park and Mount Field National Park in Tasmania, Royal Exhibition Building in Melbourne, the Great Barrier Reef in Queensland, the Twelve Apostles in Victoria, Uluru (Ayers Rock) and the Australian outback.

Tourism in New Zealand contributed NZ$7.3 billion (or 4%) of the country's GDP in 2013, as well as directly supporting 110,800 full-time equivalent jobs (nearly 6% of New Zealand's workforce). International tourist spending accounted for 16% of New Zealand's export earnings (nearly NZ$10 billion). International and domestic tourism contribute, in total, NZ$24 billion to New Zealand's economy every year. Tourism New Zealand, the country's official tourism agency, is actively promoting the country as a destination worldwide. Milford Sound in the South Island is acclaimed as New Zealand's most famous tourist destination.

In 2003 alone, according to state government data, there were over 6.4 million visitors to the Hawaiian Islands with expenditures of over $10.6 billion. Due to the mild year-round weather, tourist travel is popular throughout the year. In 2011, Hawaiʻi saw increasing arrivals and share of foreign tourists from Canada, Australia, and China increasing 13%, 24% and 21% respectively from 2010.

== Demographics ==
The demographic table below shows the subregions and countries of geopolitical Oceania. The countries and territories in this table are categorised according to the scheme for geographic subregions used by the United Nations. The information shown follows sources in cross-referenced articles; where sources differ, provisos have been clearly indicated. These territories and regions are subject to various additional categorisations, depending on the source and purpose of each description.

Arms	Flag	Name of region, followed by countries	Area (km^{2})	Population (2021)	Population density (per km^{2})	Capital	ISO 3166-1
Australasia
Australia	(Ashmore and Cartier Islands)	Ashmore and Cartier Islands (Australia)	199	0	0		AU
Australia	(Australia)	Australia	7,686,850	25,921,089	3.1	Canberra	AU
Australia	(Australia)	Christmas Island (Australia)	135	1,692	12.5	Flying Fish Cove	CX
Australia	(Australia)	Cocos (Keeling) Islands (Australia)	14	593	42.4	West Island	CC
Australia	(Australia)	Coral Sea Islands (Australia)	10	4	0.4		AU
New Zealand	(New Zealand)	New Zealand	268,680	5,129,727	17.3	Wellington	NZ
Australia	(Australia)	Norfolk Island (Australia)	35	2,302	65.8	Kingston	NF
		Australasia (total)	7,955,923	29,645,874	3.7		
Melanesia
Fiji	(Fiji)	Fiji	18,270	924,610	49.2	Suva	FJ
France	(France)	New Caledonia (France)	19,060	287,800	14.3	Nouméa	NC (FR-NC)
	(Indonesia)	Aru Islands Regency, Maluku (Indonesia)	6,426	108,834	17	Dobo	ID (ID-MA)
	(Indonesia)	Central Papua (Indonesia)	61,073	1,431,000	23	Wanggar, Nabire Regency	ID (ID-PT)
	(Indonesia)	Highland Papua (Indonesia)	51,213	1,430,500	28	Walesi, Jayawijaya Regency	ID (ID-PE)
Papua (province)	(Indonesia)	Papua (Indonesia)	82,681	1,035,000	13	Jayapura	ID (ID-PA)
	(Indonesia)	South Papua (Indonesia)	117,849	522,200	4.4	Salor, Merauke Regency	ID (ID-PS)
	(Indonesia)	Southwest Papua (Indonesia)	39,123	621,904	16	Sorong	ID (ID-PD)
West Papua (province)	(Indonesia)	West Papua (Indonesia)	60,275	561,403	9	Manokwari	ID (ID-PB)
Papua New Guinea	(Papua New Guinea)	Papua New Guinea	462,840	9,949,437	17.5	Port Moresby	PG
Solomon Islands	(Solomon Islands)	Solomon Islands	28,450	707,851	21.1	Honiara	SB
Vanuatu	(Vanuatu)	Vanuatu	12,200	319,137	22.2	Port Vila	VU
		Melanesia (total)	1,000,231	14,373,536	14.4		
Micronesia
Federated States of Micronesia	(Federated States of Micronesia)	Federated States of Micronesia	702	113,131	149.5	Palikir	FM
United States	(United States)	Guam (United States)	549	170,534	296.7	Hagåtña	GU (US-GU)
Kiribati	(Kiribati)	Kiribati	811	128,874	141.1	South Tarawa	KI
Marshall Islands	(Marshall Islands)	Marshall Islands	181	42,050	293.2	Majuro	MH
Nauru	(Nauru)	Naoero	21	12,511	540.3	Yaren (de facto)	NR
United States	(United States)	Northern Mariana Islands (United States)	477	49,481	115.4	Saipan	MP (US-MP)
Palau	(Palau)	Palau	458	18,024	46.9	Ngerulmud	PW
United States	(United States)	Wake Island (United States)	2	150	75	Wake Island	UM (UM-79)
		Micronesia (total)	3,307	526,343	163.5		
Polynesia
United States	(United States)	American Samoa (United States)	199	45,035	279.4	Pago Pago, Fagatogo	AS (US-AS)
New Zealand	(New Zealand)	Cook Islands (New Zealand)	240	17,003	72.4	Avarua	CK
Chile	(Chile)	Easter Island (Chile)	164	5,761	35.1	Hanga Roa	CL (CL-VS)
France	(France)	French Polynesia (France)	4,167	304,032	67.2	Papeete	PF (FR-PF)
United States	(United States)	Hawaii (United States)	16,636	1,360,301	81.8	Honolulu	US (US-HI)
United States	(Johnston Atoll)	Johnston Atoll (United States)	276.6	0	0	Johnston Atoll	UM (UM-67)
United States	(Midway Atoll)	Midway Atoll (United States)	2,355	39	6.37	Midway Atoll	UM (UM-71)
New Zealand	(New Zealand)	Niue (New Zealand)	260	1,937	6.2	Alofi	NU
United Kingdom	(United Kingdom)	Pitcairn Islands (United Kingdom)	47	47	1	Adamstown	PN
Samoa	(Samoa)	Samoa	2,944	218,764	66.3	Apia	WS
New Zealand	(New Zealand)	Tokelau (New Zealand)	10	1,849	128.2	Atafu (de facto)	TK
Tonga	(Tonga)	Tonga	748	106,017	143.2	Nukuʻalofa	TO
Tuvalu	(Tuvalu)	Tuvalu	26	11,204	426.8	Funafuti	TV
France	(France)	Wallis and Futuna (France)	274	11,627	43.4	Mata-Utu	WF
		Polynesia (total minus mainland New Zealand)	25,715	2,047,444	79.6		
Total			8,919,530	50,099,312	5.1		
Total minus mainland Australia			1,232,680	24,178,223	16.6		

=== Largest city for regions ===
- Australasia (metro, urban or proper largest city: Sydney)
- Melanesia (metro, urban or proper largest city: Jayapura)
- Micronesia (metro, urban or proper largest city: Dededo)
- Polynesia (metro, urban or proper largest city: Auckland)

=== Cities by metropolitan area ===
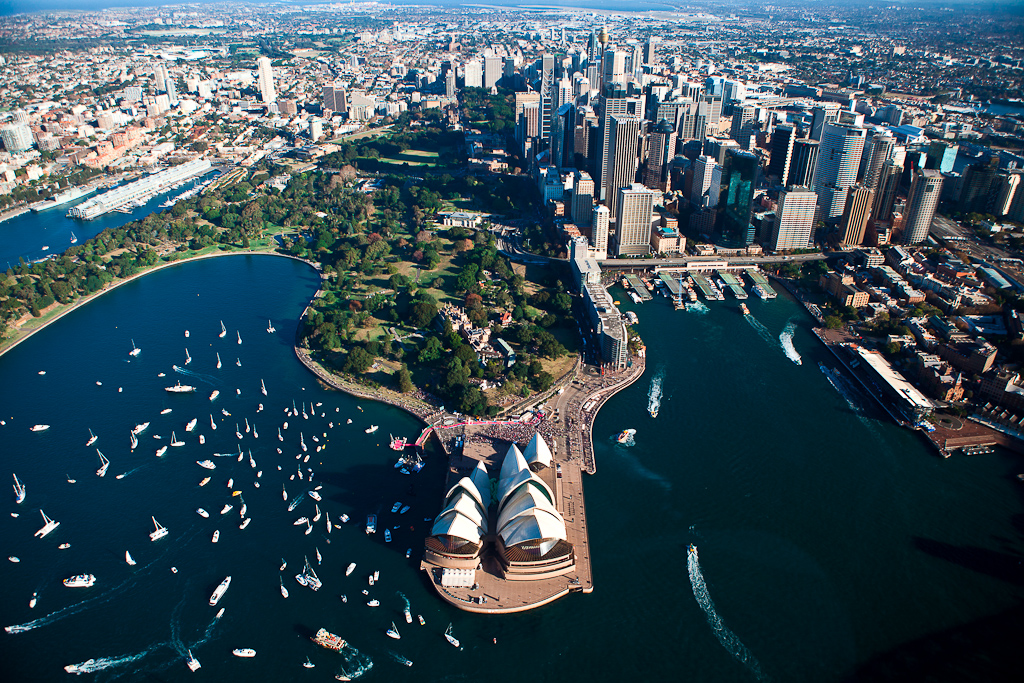
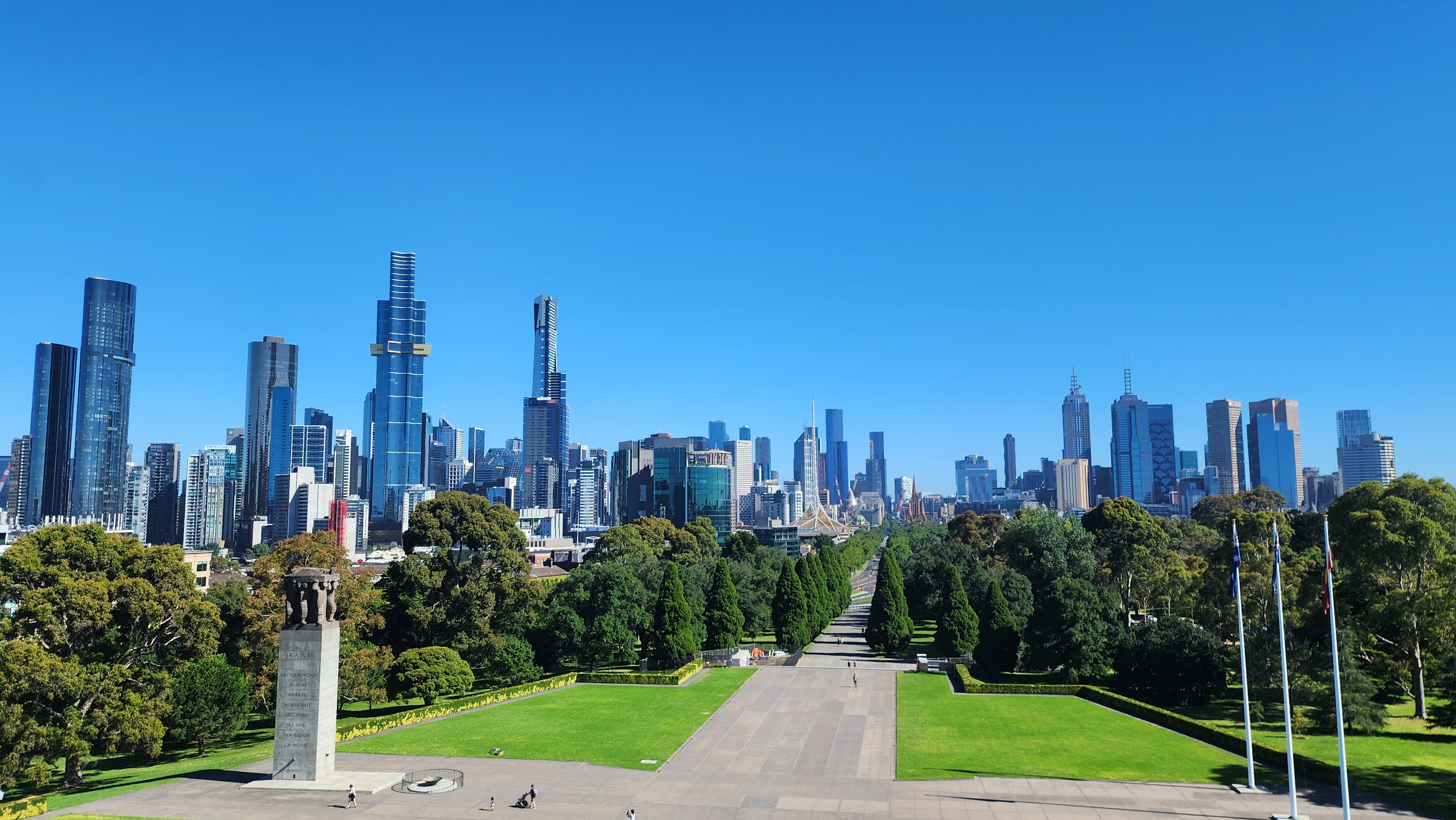
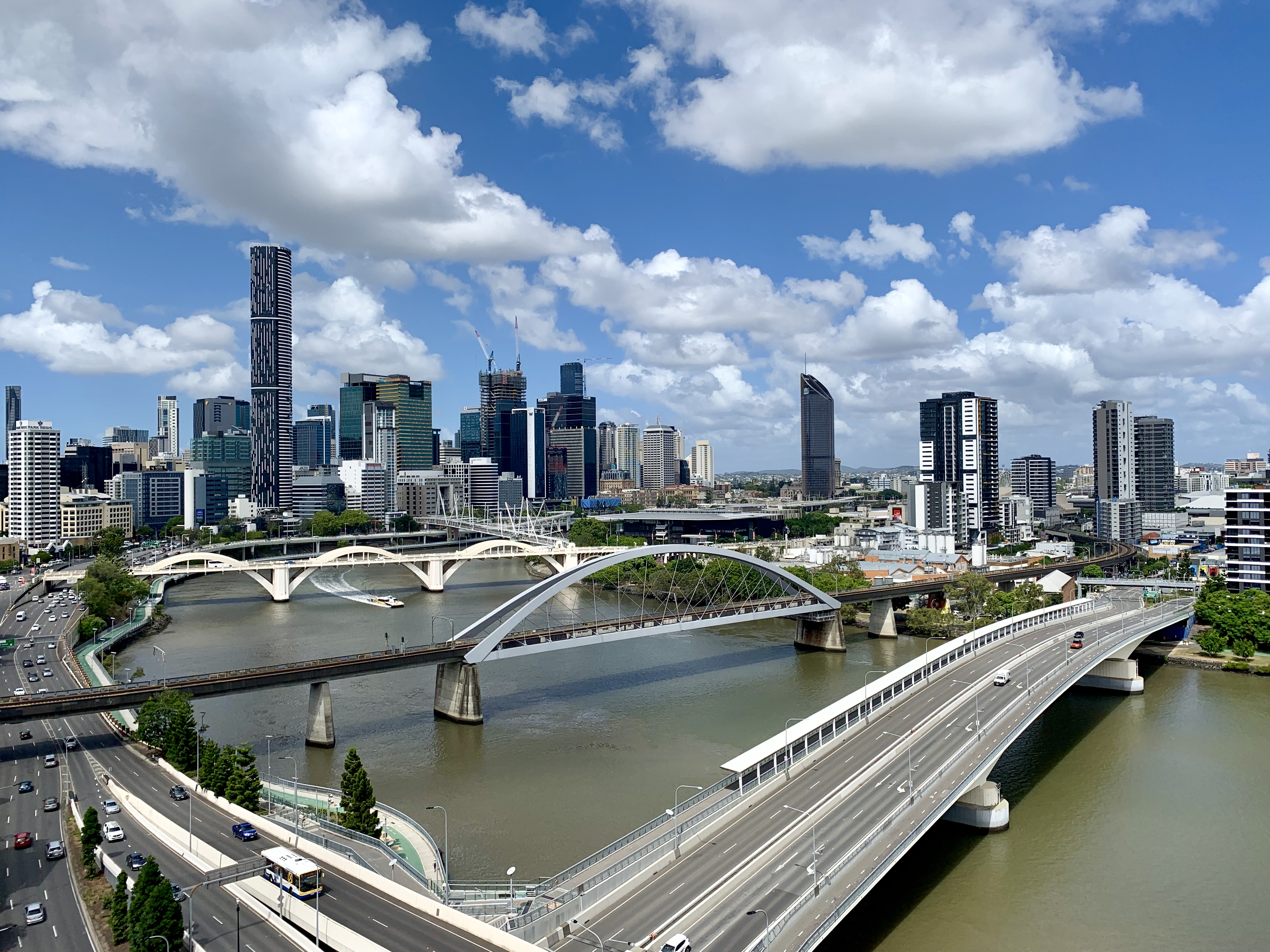
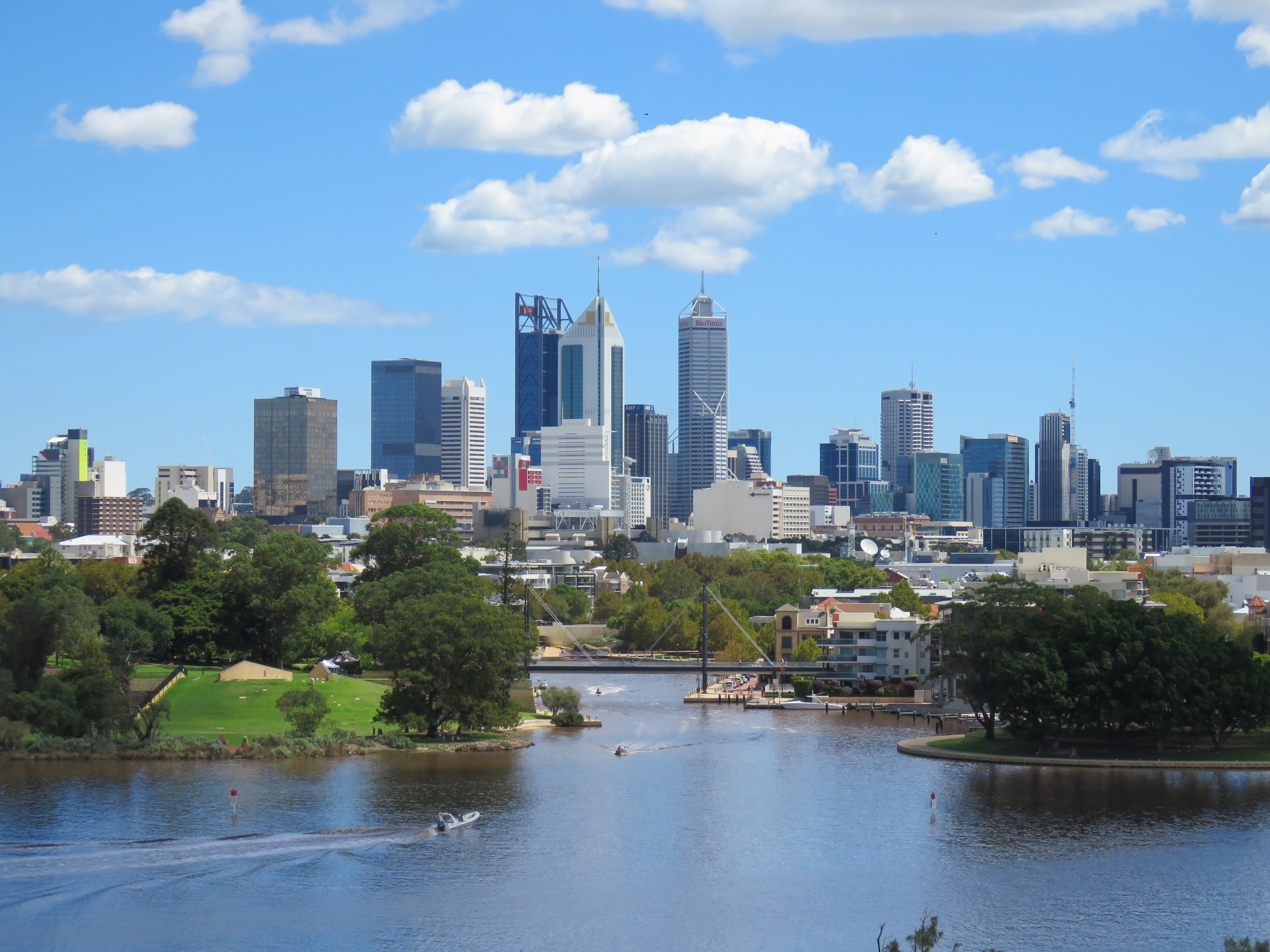
Largest population centres of Oceania June 2025 estimate (SSGA18 boundaries)
	Rank	City name	Country	Pop.	Rank	City name	Country	Pop.
Sydney Melbourne	1	Sydney	Australia	5,131,326	11	Canberra	Australia	435,019	Brisbane Perth
Sydney Melbourne	2	Melbourne	Australia	5,031,195	12	Jayapura	Indonesia	414,862	Brisbane Perth
Sydney Melbourne	3	Brisbane	Australia	2,408,223	13	Port Moresby	Papua New Guinea	420,000	Brisbane Perth
Sydney Melbourne	4	Perth	Australia	2,043,138	14	Christchurch	New Zealand	407,800	Brisbane Perth
Sydney Melbourne	5	Auckland	New Zealand	1,547,200	15	Sunshine Coast, Queensland	Australia	317,404	Brisbane Perth
Sydney Melbourne	6	Adelaide	Australia	1,333,927	16	Wollongong	Australia	295,669	Brisbane Perth
Sydney Melbourne	7	Honolulu	United States	953,207	17	Sorong	Indonesia	294,978	Brisbane Perth
Sydney Melbourne	8	Gold Coast, Queensland	Australia	646,983	18	Hobart	Australia	224,462	Brisbane Perth
Sydney Melbourne	9	Wellington	New Zealand	497,200	19	Geelong	Australia	196,393	Brisbane Perth
Sydney Melbourne	10	Newcastle, New South Wales	Australia	436,171	20	Hamilton, New Zealand	New Zealand	192,100	Brisbane Perth

=== Religion ===
The predominant religion in Oceania is Christianity (73%). A 2011 survey found that 92% in Melanesia, 93% in Micronesia and 96% in Polynesia described themselves as Christians. Traditional religions are often animist, and prevalent among traditional tribes is the belief in spirits (masalai in Tok Pisin) representing natural forces. In the 2018 census, 37% of New Zealanders affiliated themselves with Christianity, and 48% declared no religion. In the 2016 Census, 52% of the Australian population declared some variety of Christianity and 30% stated "no religion".

In recent Australian and New Zealand censuses, large proportions of the population say they belong to "no religion" (which includes atheism, agnosticism, deism, and secular humanism). In Tonga, everyday life is heavily influenced by Polynesian traditions and especially by the Christian faith. The Ahmadiyya mosque in the Marshall Islands is the only mosque in Micronesia. Another one in Tuvalu belongs to the same sect. The Baháʼí House of Worship in Tiapapata, Samoa, is one of seven designations administered in the Baháʼí Faith.

Hinduism is a minority faith in Oceania. Fiji has the highest percentage of Hindus in Oceania at 29.7% In absolute numbers, Australia has the largest population of Hindus in Oceania constituting 2.7% of the country's population. In New Zealand, Hindus form 2.65% of the population of. Samoa also has a significant Hindu population.

Other religions in the region include Islam and Buddhism, which are prominent minority religions in Australia and New Zealand. Judaism, Sikhism and Jainism are also present. Sir Isaac Isaacs was the first Australian-born Governor-General of Australia and was the first Jewish vice-regal representative in the British Empire. Prince Philip Movement is followed around Yaohnanen village on the southern island of Tanna in Vanuatu.

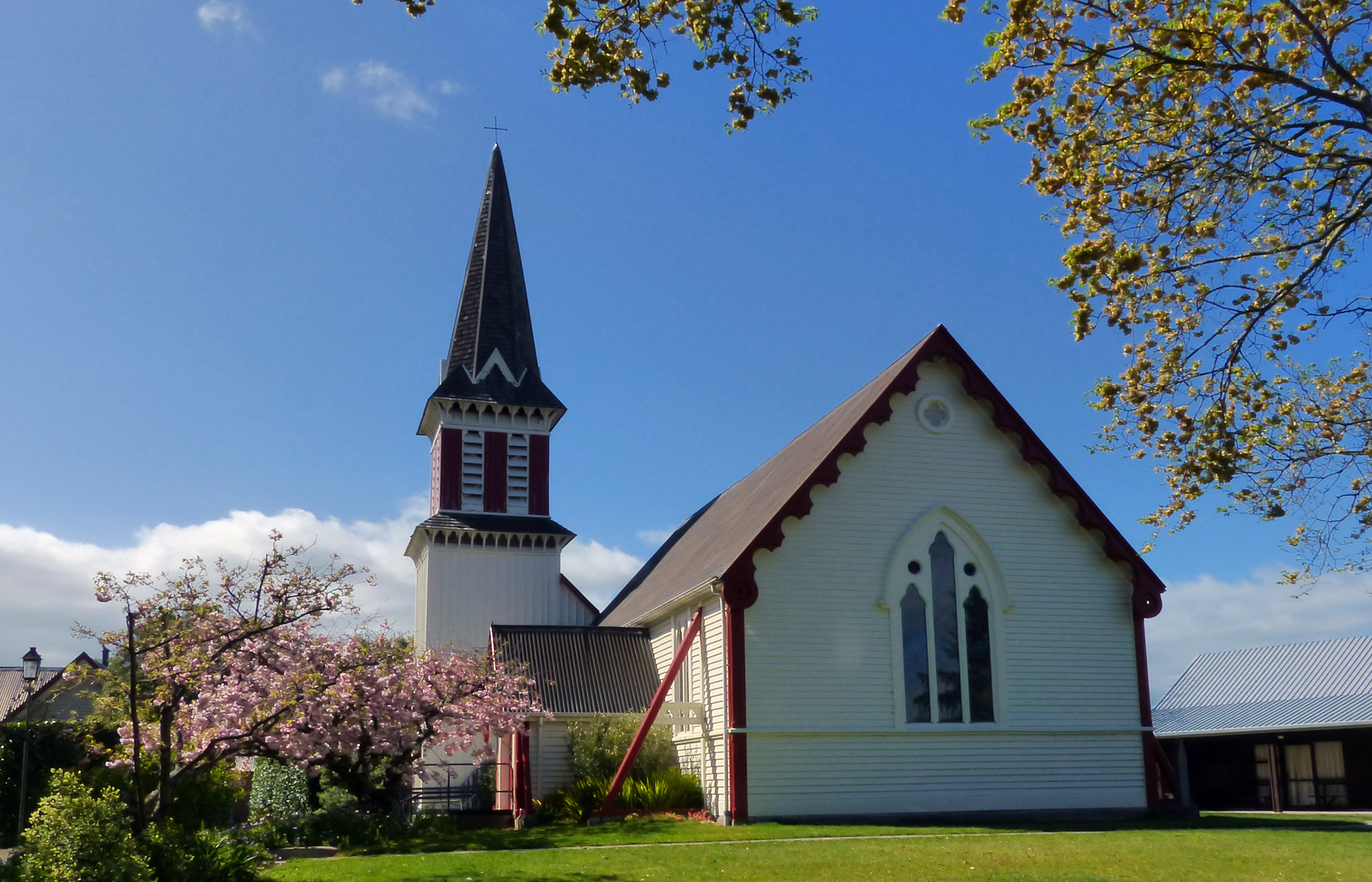
Holy's Innocent Anglican Church in Amberley, New Zealand

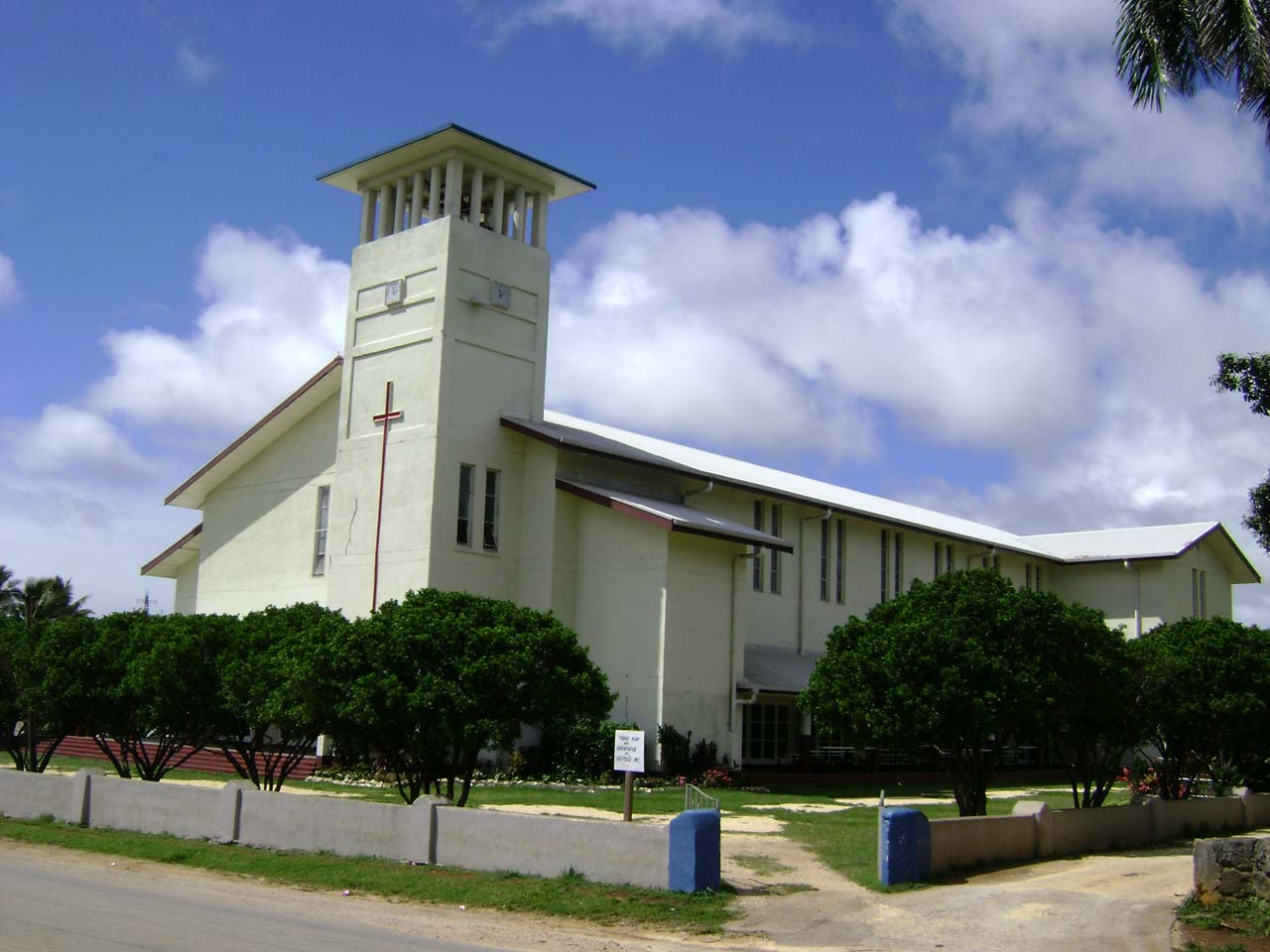
Saione, the church of the King, a Free Wesleyan Church in Kolomotuʻa, Tonga. Especially, British and American missionaries brought various Protestant denominations to Oceania.

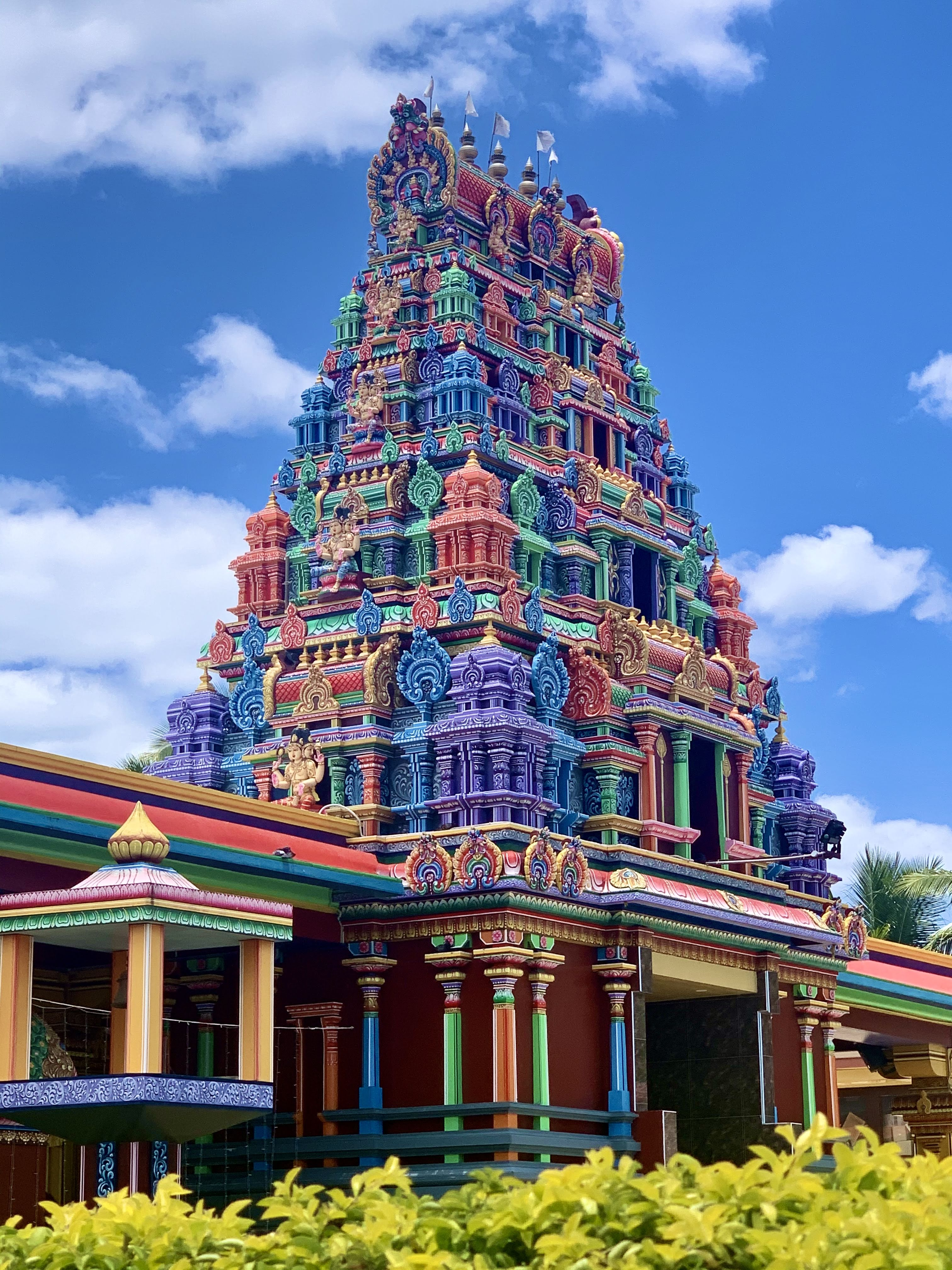
Sri Siva Subramaniya temple in Fiji

=== Languages ===
Native languages of Oceania fall into three major geographic groups:

- The large Austronesian language family, with such languages as Malay (Indonesian), and Oceanic languages such as Gilbertese, Fijian, Māori, and Hawaiʻian
- The Aboriginal Australian languages, including the large Pama–Nyungan family
- The Papuan languages of New Guinea and neighbouring islands, including the large Trans–New Guinea family

Immigrants brought their own languages to the region. Common non-indigenous languages include English in Australia, New Zealand, Hawaii, and many other territories; French in New Caledonia, French Polynesia, Wallis and Futuna; Japanese in the Bonin Islands; and Spanish on Easter Island and the Galápagos Islands. There are also Creoles formed from the interaction of Malay or the colonial languages with indigenous languages, such as Tok Pisin, Bislama, Chavacano, various Malay trade and creole languages, Hawaiian Pidgin, Norfuk, and Pitkern. Contact between Austronesian and Papuan resulted in several instances in mixed languages such as Maisin.

=== Immigration ===
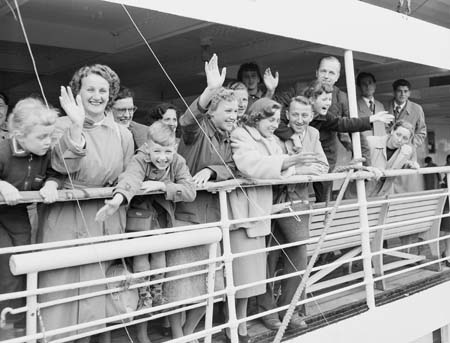
Dutch immigrants arriving in Melbourne, Australia in 1954

The most multicultural areas in Oceania, which have a high degree of immigration, are Australia, New Zealand, and Hawaii. Since 1945, more than 7 million people have settled in Australia. From the late 1970s, there was a significant increase in immigration from Asian and other non-European countries, making Australia a multicultural country.

Sydney is the most multicultural city in Oceania, having more than 250 different languages spoken, with about 40% of residents speaking a language other than English at home. Furthermore, 36 percent of the population reported having been born overseas, with top countries being Italy, Lebanon, Vietnam, and Iraq, among others. Melbourne is also fairly multicultural, having the largest Greek-speaking population outside of Europe, and the second largest Asian population in Australia after Sydney.

European migration to New Zealand provided a major influx following the signing of the Treaty of Waitangi in 1840. Subsequent immigration has been chiefly from the British Isles, but also from continental Europe, the Pacific, the Americas, and Asia. Auckland is home to over half (51.6 percent) of New Zealand's overseas-born population, including 72 percent of the country's Pacific Island-born population, 64 percent of its Asian-born population, and 56 percent of its Middle Eastern and African-born population.

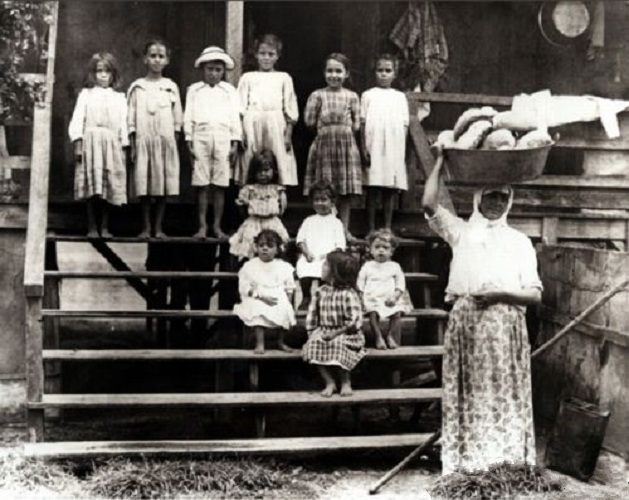
Many Portuguese immigrants in Hawaii were Azorean or Madeiran.

Hawaii is a majority-minority state. Chinese workers on Western trading ships settled in Hawaii starting in 1789. In 1820, the first American missionaries arrived to preach Christianity and teach the Hawaiians Western ways. As of 2015, a large proportion of Hawaii's population has Asian ancestry – especially Filipino, Japanese, Korean and Chinese. Many are descendants of immigrants brought to work on the sugarcane plantations in the mid-to-late 19th century. Almost 13,000 Portuguese immigrants had arrived by 1899; they also worked on the sugarcane plantations. Puerto Rican immigration to Hawaii began in 1899 when Puerto Rico's sugar industry was devastated by two hurricanes, causing a worldwide shortage of sugar and a huge demand for sugar from Hawaii.

Between 2001 and 2007, Australia's Pacific Solution policy transferred asylum seekers to several Pacific nations, including the Nauru detention centre. Australia, New Zealand, and other nations took part in the Regional Assistance Mission to Solomon Islands between 2003 and 2017 after a request for aid.

=== Archaeogenetics ===
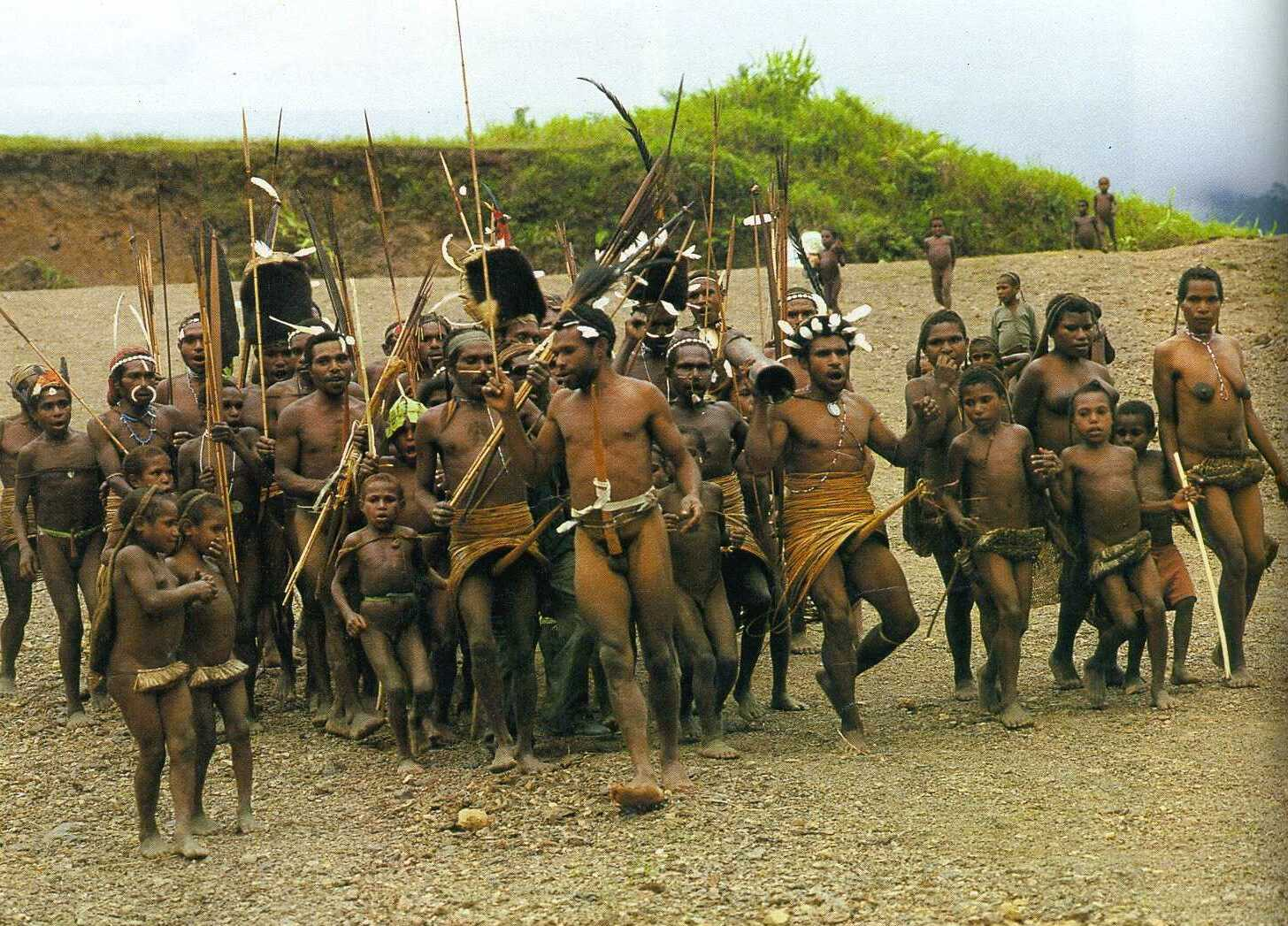
Yali in the Yahukimo Regency, Highland Papua

Archaeology, linguistics, and existing genetic studies indicate that Oceania was settled by two major waves of migration. The first migration of Australo-Melanesians took place c. 40 to 80 thousand years ago, and these migrants, Papuans, colonised much of Near Oceania. Approximately 3.5 thousand years ago, a second expansion of Austronesian speakers arrived in Near Oceania, and the descendants of these people spread to the far corners of the Pacific, colonising Remote Oceania. Mitochondrial DNA (mtDNA) studies quantify the magnitude of the Austronesian expansion and demonstrate the homogenising effect of this expansion. With regards to Papuan influence, autochthonous haplogroups support the hypothesis of a long history in Near Oceania, with some lineages suggesting a time depth of 60 thousand years. Santa Cruz, a population located in Remote Oceania, is an anomaly with extreme frequencies of autochthonous haplogroups of Near Oceanian origin.

Large areas of New Guinea are unexplored by scientists and anthropologists due to extensive deforestation and mountainous terrain. Known indigenous tribes in Papua New Guinea have very little contact with local authorities aside from the authorities knowing who they are. Many remain preliterate and, at the national or international level, the names of tribes and information about them are extremely hard to obtain. The Indonesian provinces of Papua and West Papua on the island of New Guinea are home to an estimated 44 uncontacted tribal groups.

== Culture ==
=== Australia ===
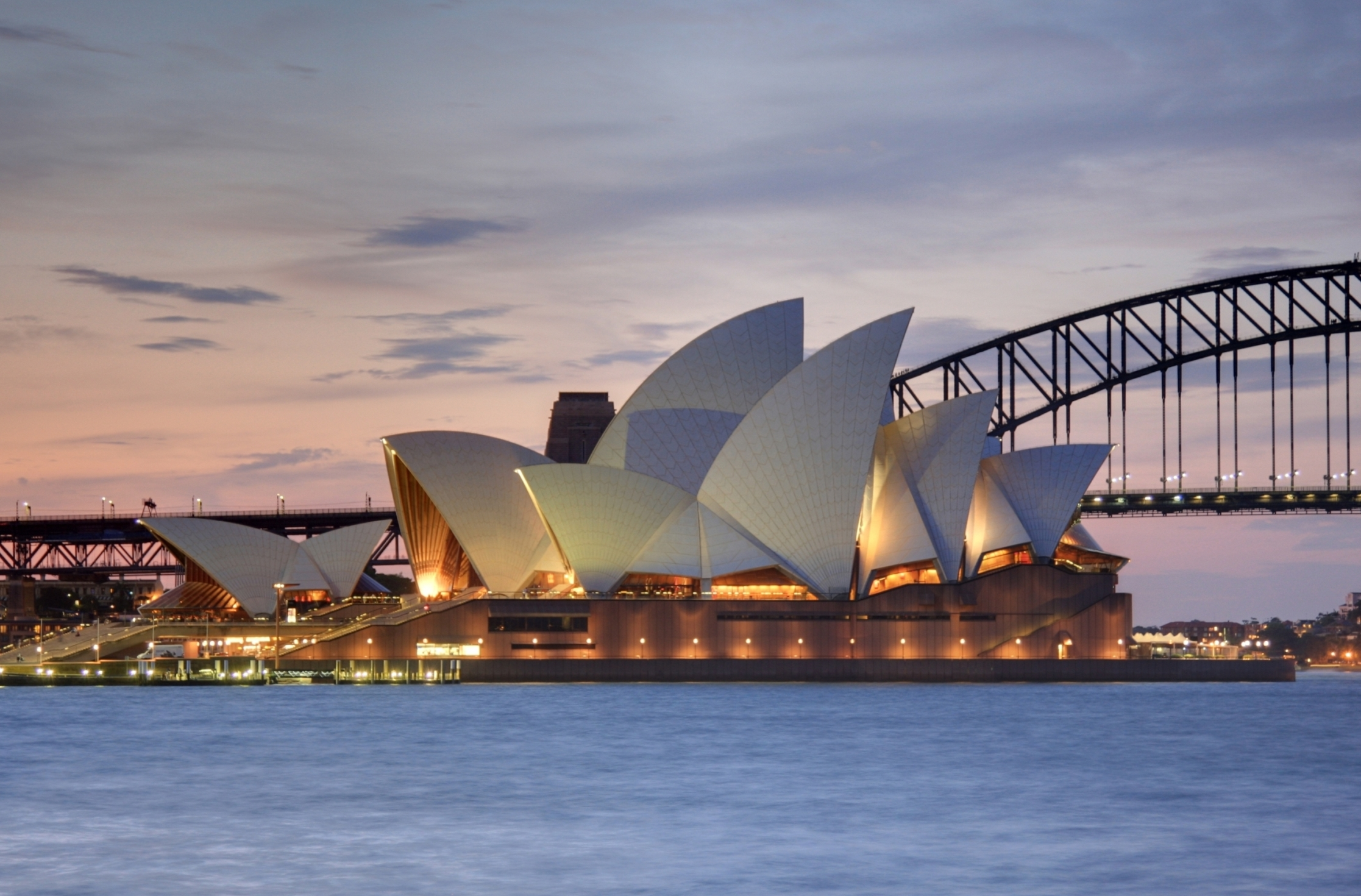
On 28 June 2007, the Sydney Opera House became a UNESCO World Heritage Site.

Since 1788, the primary influence behind Australian culture has been Anglo-Celtic Western culture, with some Indigenous influences. The divergence and evolution that have occurred in the ensuing centuries have resulted in a distinctive Australian culture. Since the mid-20th century, American popular culture has strongly influenced Australia, particularly through television and cinema. Other cultural influences come from neighbouring Asian countries, and through large-scale immigration from non-English-speaking nations. The Story of the Kelly Gang (1906), the world's first feature-length film, spurred a boom in Australian cinema during the silent film era. The Australian Museum in Sydney and the National Gallery of Victoria in Melbourne are the oldest and largest museums in Oceania. The city's New Year's Eve celebrations are the largest in Oceania.

Australia is also known for its cafe and coffee culture in urban centres. Australia and New Zealand were responsible for the flat white coffee. Most Indigenous Australian tribal groups subsisted on a simple hunter-gatherer diet of native fauna and flora, otherwise called bush tucker. The first settlers introduced British food to the continent, much of which is now considered typical Australian food, such as the Sunday roast. Multicultural immigration transformed Australian cuisine; post-World War II European migrants, particularly from the Mediterranean, helped to build a thriving Australian coffee culture, and the influence of Asian cultures has led to Australian variants of their staple foods, such as the Chinese-inspired dim sim and Chiko Roll.

=== Hawaii ===
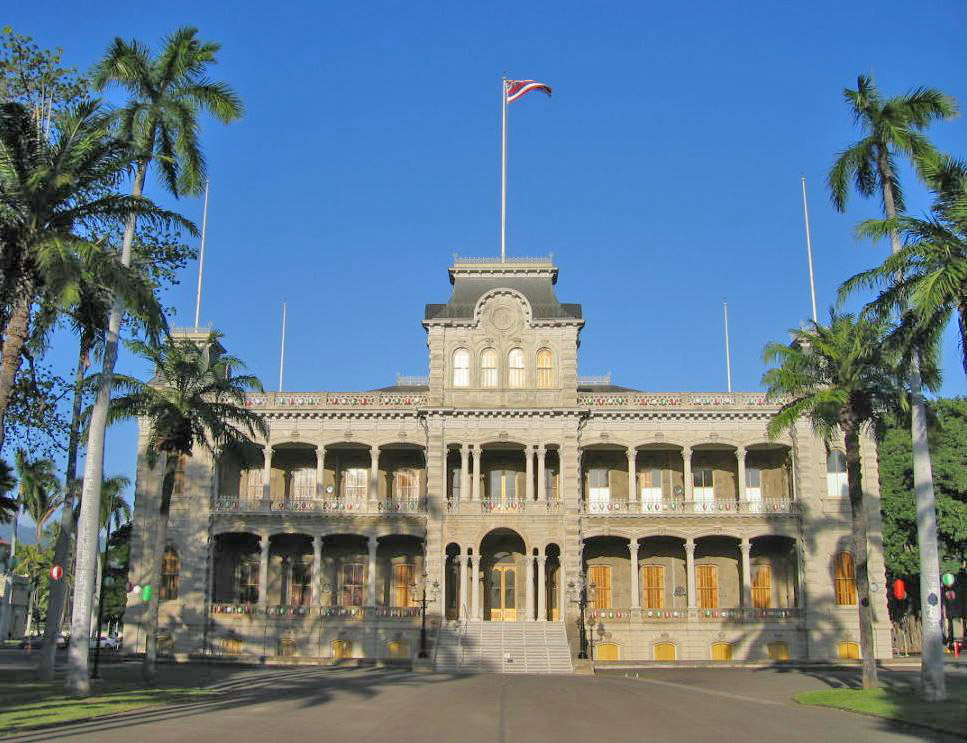
The ʻIolani Palace in Honolulu, formerly the residence of the Hawaiian monarch, was restored and opened to the public as a museum in 1978.

The music of Hawaii includes traditional and popular styles, ranging from native Hawaiian folk music to modern rock and hip-hop. Hawaii's musical contributions to the music of the United States are out of proportion to the state's small size. Styles such as slack-key guitar are well known worldwide, while Hawaiian-tinged music is a frequent part of Hollywood soundtracks. Hawaii also made a major contribution to country music with the introduction of the steel guitar. The Hawaiian religion is polytheistic and animistic, with a belief in many deities and spirits, including the belief that spirits are found in non-human beings and objects such as animals, the waves, and the sky.

The cuisine of Hawaii is a fusion of many foods brought by immigrants to the Hawaiian Islands, including the earliest Polynesians and native Hawaiians, and American, Chinese, Filipino, Japanese, Korean, Polynesian, and Portuguese origins. Native Hawaiian musician and Hawaiian sovereignty activist Israel Kamakawiwoʻole, famous for his medley of "Somewhere Over the Rainbow/What a Wonderful World", was named "The Voice of Hawaii" by NPR in 2010 in its 50 great voices series.

=== New Zealand ===
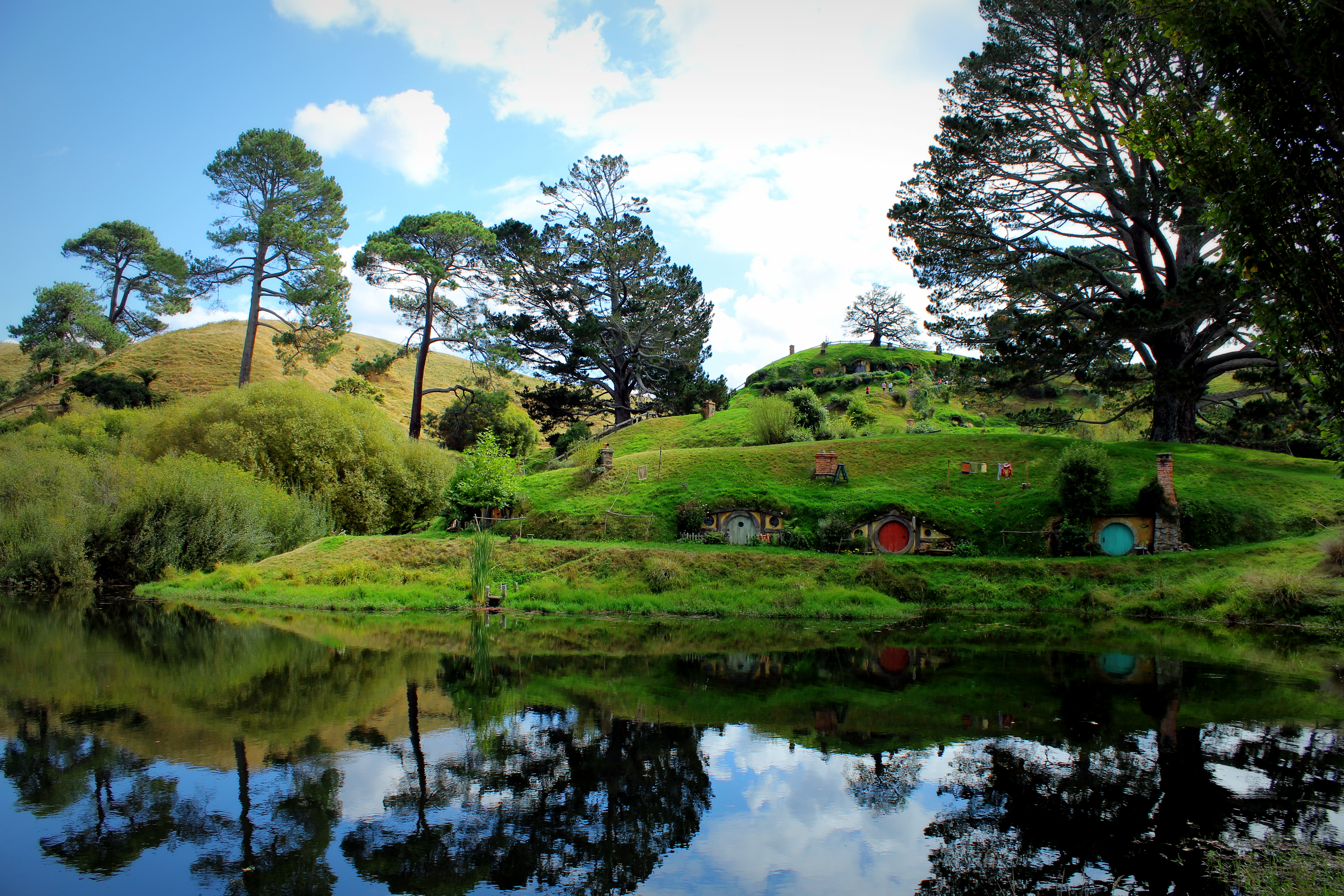
The Hobbiton Movie Set, located near Matamata, was used for The Lord of the Rings film trilogy.

New Zealand, as a culture, is a Western culture, which is influenced by the cultural input of the indigenous Māori and the various waves of multi-ethnic migration which followed the British colonisation of New Zealand. The Māori people constitute one of the major cultures of Polynesia. The country has been broadened by globalisation and immigration, specifically from Oceania, Europe, and Asia. New Zealand marks two national days of remembrance, Waitangi Day and ANZAC Day, and also celebrates many holidays such as the King's Birthday, Labour Day, and Christmas Day, as well as public anniversaries of the founding dates of most regions. The New Zealand recording industry began to develop from 1940 onwards, and many New Zealand musicians have obtained success in Britain and the United States. Some artists release Māori language songs, and the Māori tradition-based art of kapa haka (song and dance) has made a resurgence. The country's diverse scenery and compact size, plus government incentives, have encouraged some producers to film big-budget movies in New Zealand, including Avatar, The Lord of the Rings, The Hobbit, The Chronicles of Narnia, King Kong and The Last Samurai.

The national cuisine has been described as Pacific Rim, incorporating the native Māori cuisine and diverse culinary traditions introduced by settlers and immigrants from Europe, Polynesia, and Asia. New Zealand yields produce from land and sea – most crops and livestock, such as maize, potatoes, and pigs, were gradually introduced by the early European settlers. Distinctive ingredients or dishes include lamb; salmon; koura (crayfish); whitebait; shellfish including dredge oysters, pāua, mussels, scallops, pipi and tuatua; kumara (sweet potato); kiwifruit; tamarillo; and pavlova (considered a national dish).

=== Samoa ===
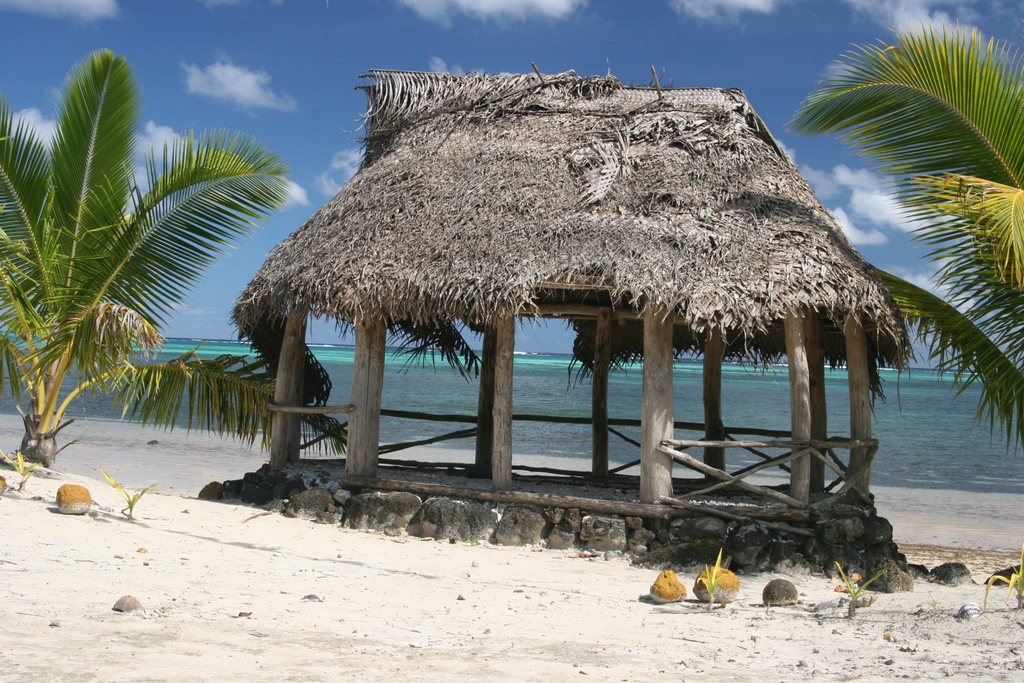
A fale on Manono Island

The fa'a Samoa, or traditional Samoan way, remains a strong force in Samoan life and politics. Despite centuries of European influence, Samoa maintains its historical customs, social and political systems, and language. Cultural customs such as the Samoa 'ava ceremony are significant and solemn rituals at important occasions, including the bestowal of matai chiefly titles. Items of great cultural value include the finely woven 'ie toga. The Samoan word for dance is siva, which consists of unique, gentle movements of the body in time to music and which tell a story. Samoan male dances can be more snappy. The sasa is also a traditional dance where rows of dancers perform rapid synchronised movements in time to the rhythm of wooden drums (pate) or rolled mats. Another dance performed by males is called the fa'ataupati or the slap dance, creating rhythmic sounds by slapping different parts of the body. As with other Polynesian cultures (Hawaiian, Tahitian, and Māori) with significant and unique tattoos, Samoans have two gender specific and culturally significant tattoos.

=== Arts ===
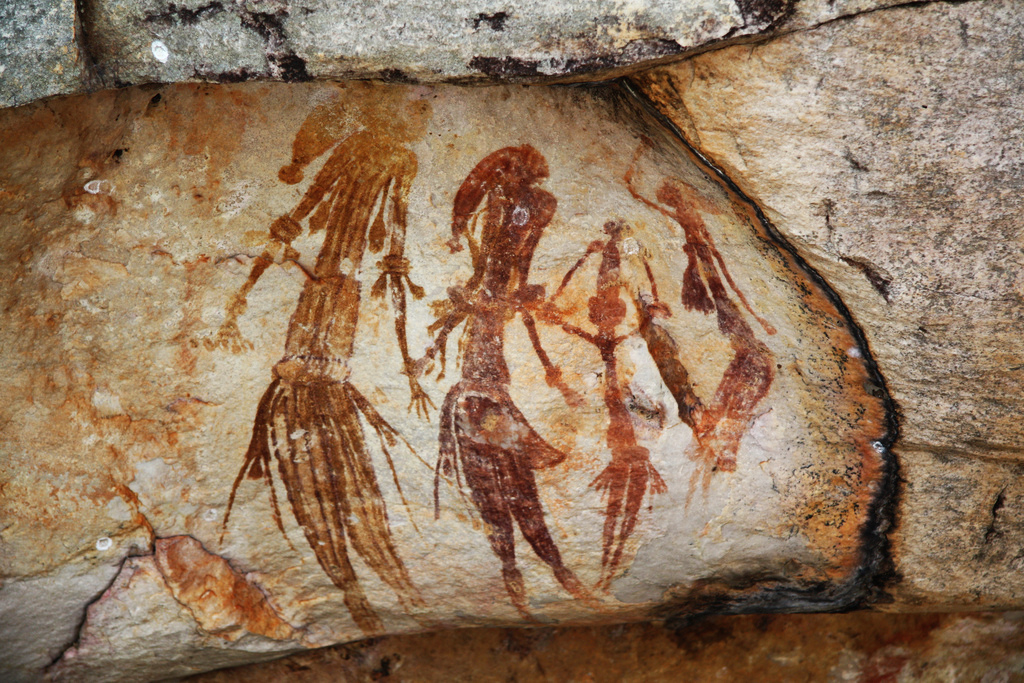
Gwion Gwion rock paintings found in the north-west Kimberley region of Western Australia

The artistic creations of native Oceanians vary greatly throughout the cultures and regions. The subject matter typically carries themes of fertility or the supernatural. Petroglyphs, tattooing, painting, wood carving, stone carving, and textile work are other common art forms. Art of Oceania properly encompasses the artistic traditions of the people indigenous to Australia and the Pacific Islands. These early peoples lacked a writing system, and they made works on perishable materials, so few records of them exist from this time. Indigenous Australian rock art is the oldest and richest unbroken tradition of art in the world, dating as far back as 60,000 years and spread across hundreds of thousands of sites. These rock paintings served several functions. Some were used in magic, others to increase animal populations for hunting, while some were simply for amusement. Sculpture in Oceania first appears on New Guinea as a series of stone figures found throughout the island, but mostly in the mountainous highlands. Establishing a chronological timeframe for these pieces in most cases is difficult, but one has been dated to c. 1500 BCE.

By 1500 BCE, the Lapita culture, descendants of the second wave, would begin to expand and spread into the more remote islands. At around the same time, art began to appear in New Guinea, including the earliest examples of sculpture in Oceania. Beginning c. 1100 CE, the people of Easter Island would begin construction of nearly 900 moai (large stone statues). At c. 1200 CE, the people of Pohnpei, a Micronesian island, would embark on another megalithic construction, building Nan Madol, a city of artificial islands and a system of canals. Hawaiian art includes wood carvings, feather work, petroglyphs, bark cloth (called kapa in Hawaiian and tapa elsewhere in the Pacific), and tattoos. Native Hawaiians had neither metal nor woven cloth.

=== Sport ===
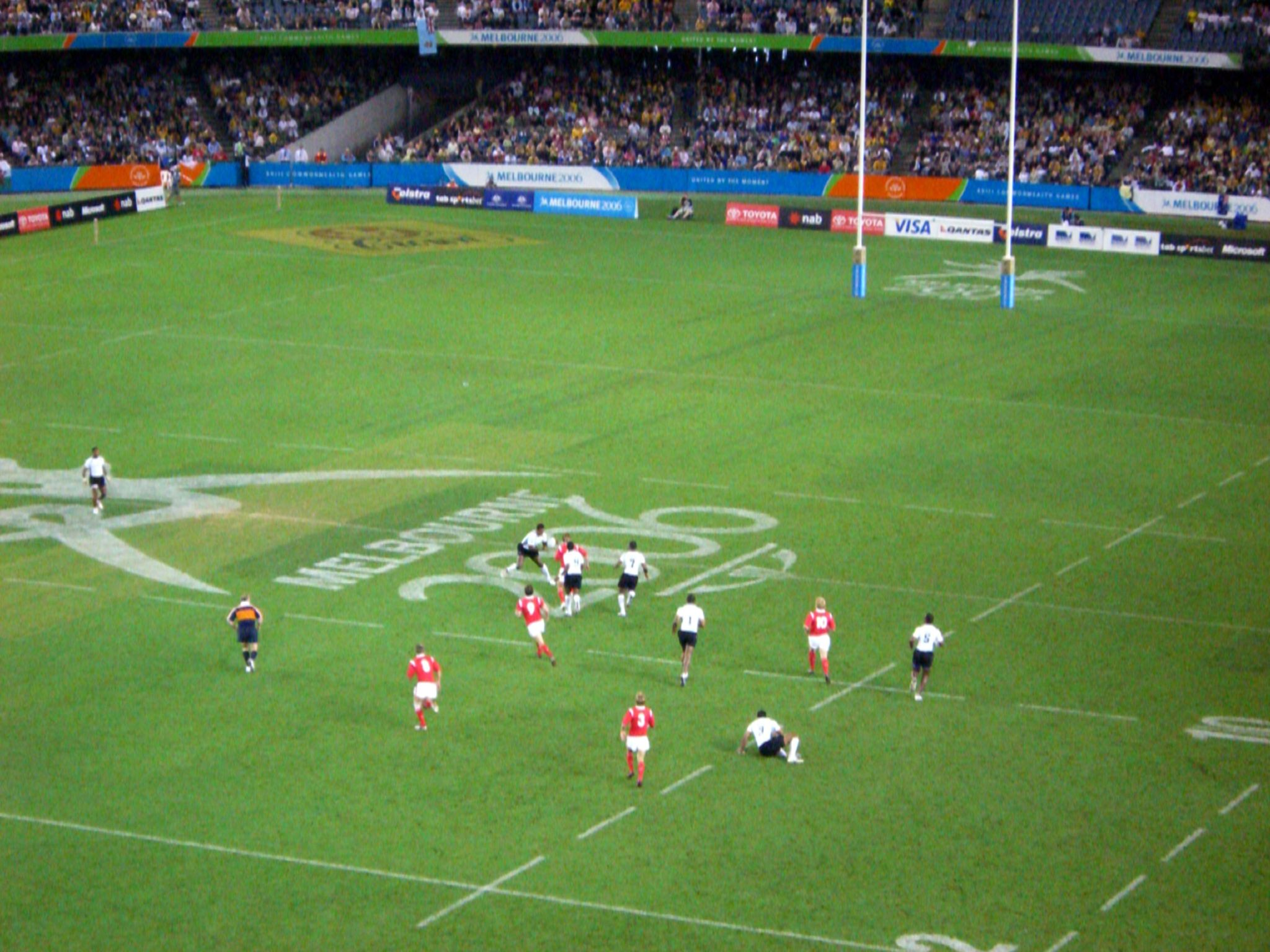
Fiji playing Wales at seven-a-side rugby

Rugby union is one of the region's most prominent sports, and is the national sport of New Zealand, Samoa, Fiji, and Tonga. The most popular overall sport in Australia is cricket, with its national team having won the Cricket World Cup a record five times. The most popular sport among Australian women is netball, while Australian rules football garners the highest spectatorship numbers and television ratings. Rugby union is the most popular sport among New Zealanders, and they are second only to South Africa for the most Rugby World Cup titles, having won the tournament three times. Australia's team, the Wallabies, have won the World Cup twice, despite Rugby union being less popular among Australians. In Papua New Guinea, the most popular sport is Rugby league. Fiji's sevens team is one of the most successful in the world, as is New Zealand's.

Australian rules football is the national sport in Nauru. It has a large following in Papua New Guinea, where it is the second most popular sport after Rugby League. Additionally, it attracts significant attention across New Zealand and the Pacific Islands. The highest level of the sport is the Australian Football League (AFL), which was the fourth-best attended sporting league in the world during the 2010s.

Vanuatu is the only country in Oceania to call association football its national sport. However, it is also the most popular sport in Kiribati, Solomon Islands and Tuvalu, and has a significant (and growing) popularity in Australia. In 2006, Australia left the Oceania Football Confederation (OFC) for the Asian Football Confederation (AFC); its men's team, the Socceroos, has qualified for every subsequent FIFA World Cup as an Asian entrant. The sole Micronesian country with membership in the OFC is Kiribati, although it is not recognised by FIFA like the other OFC members. Federated States of Micronesia, Marshall Islands, Nauru and Palau all have no presence, primarily due to lack of infrastructure and logistical difficulties related to Micronesia's remoteness. Like Australia, the Micronesian dependent territories of Guam and the Northern Mariana Islands currently compete in the AFC instead of the OFC. The OFC was dominated by Australia for many years, and it became known for one-sided results.

Australians view sport as an important part of their cultural identity, and the country performs well on the international stage, despite having a relatively small population. They have hosted two Summer Olympics: Melbourne 1956 and Sydney 2000, and the city of Brisbane is also set to host the 2032 edition. Australia has hosted five editions of the Commonwealth Games and New Zealand three times. The Pacific Games (formerly known as the South Pacific Games) is a multi-sport event, much like the Olympics on a much smaller scale, with participation exclusively from countries around the Pacific; Australia and New Zealand competed in the games for the first time in 2015.

Melbourne hosts the Australian Open every year, considered one of the four Grand Slam tournaments in tennis.

== See also ==
- Australasia – Subregion of Oceania
- Europeans in Oceania
- Festival of Pacific Arts – Oceanian cultural festival
- Flags of Oceania
- Global Southeast – Southeastern region of the world
- Indigenous peoples of Oceania
- Insular Chile – Islands owned by Chile
- List of cities in Oceania
- Oceania (journal)
- Oceanic cuisine – Cuisine native to the South Pacific
- Pacific Community – International development organisation
- Pacific Islander – Person from the Pacific Islands
- Pacific Union – Intergovernmental project
- United Nations geoscheme for Oceania

== Sources ==
This article incorporates text from a free content work. Licensed under CC BY 4.0 (license statement/permission). Text taken from Global Forest Resources Assessment 2025, Food and Agriculture Organization of the United Nations (FAO).
