= Lists of cities by country =

This is a list of lists on the cities of present-day nations, states and dependencies. Countries are listed in bold under their respective pages, whereas territories and dependencies are not. Disputed and unrecognized countries are italicized.

== A ==
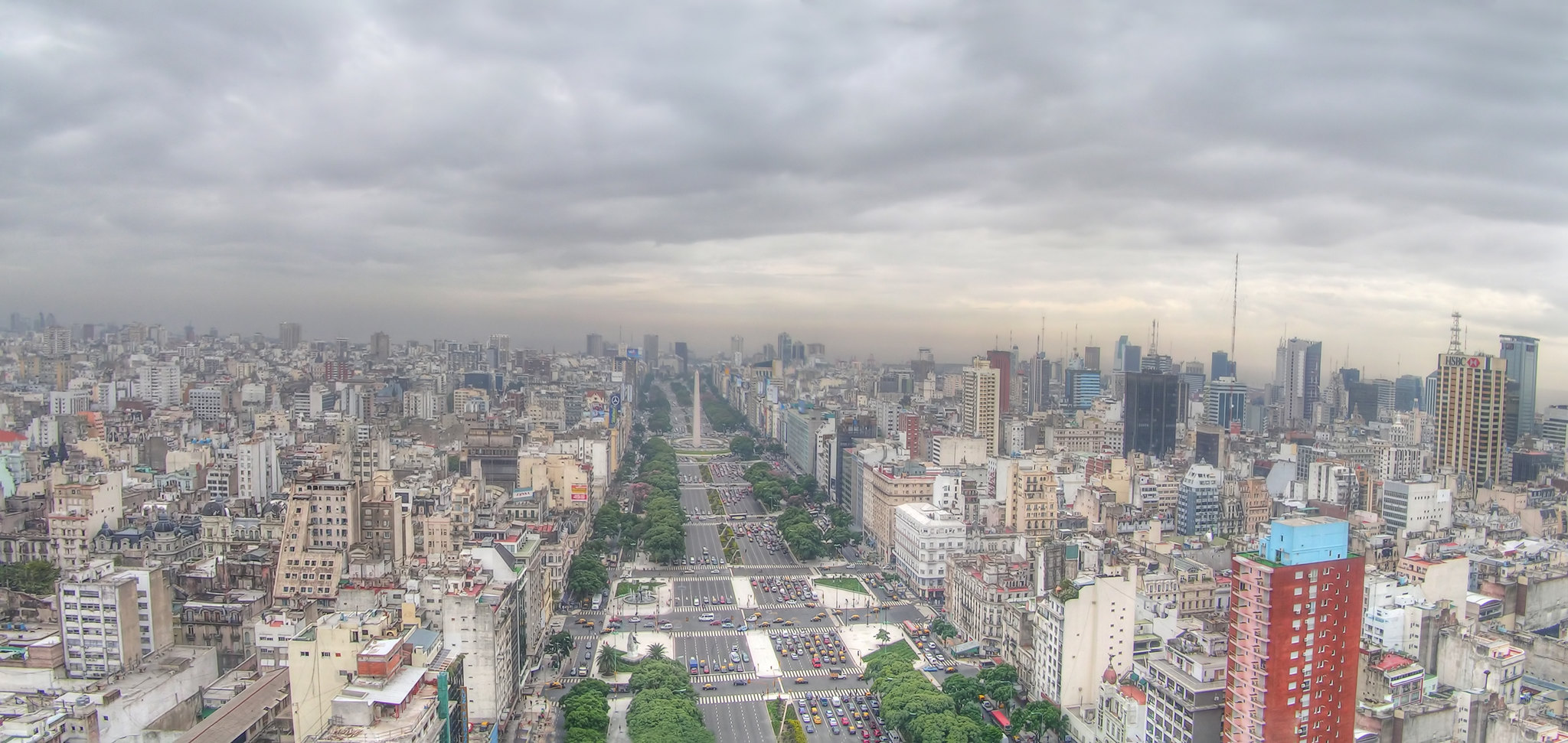
List of cities in Argentina

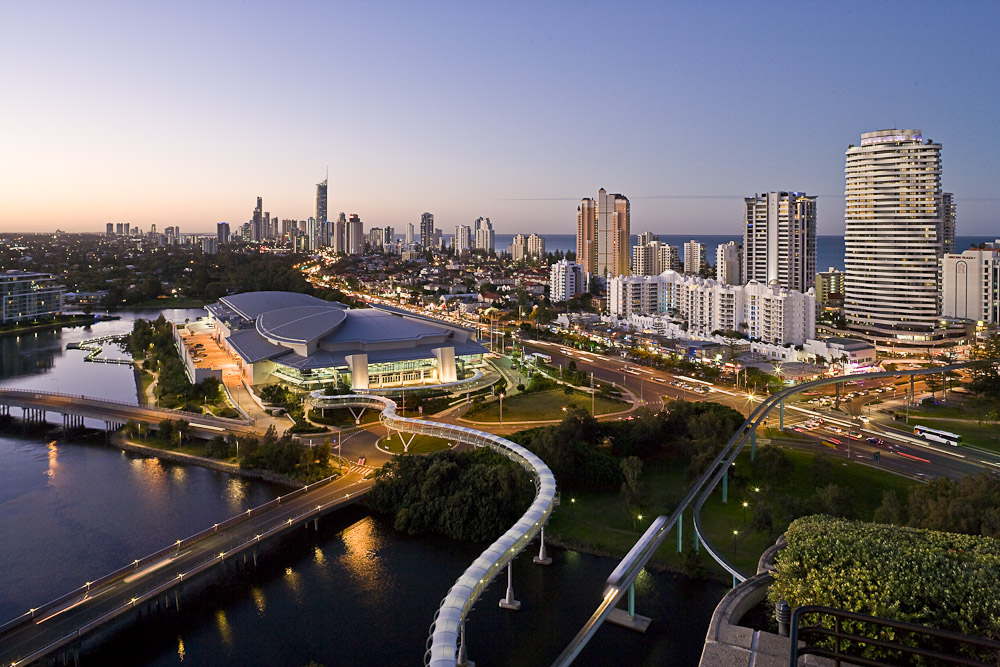
List of cities in Australia

- **List of cities in Afghanistan** - Islamic Republic of Afghanistan
- **List of cities in Albania** - Republic of Albania
- **List of cities in Algeria** - People's Democratic Republic of Algeria
- **List of cities in Andorra** - Principality of Andorra
- **List of cities in Angola** - Republic of Angola
- **List of cities in Antigua and Barbuda** - Antigua and Barbuda
- **List of cities in Argentina** - Argentine Republic
- **List of cities in Armenia** - Republic of Armenia
- **List of cities in Aruba** - Aruba (Dutch crown dependency)
- **List of cities in Australia** - Commonwealth of Australia
- **List of cities in Austria** - Republic of Austria
- **List of cities in Azerbaijan** - Republic of Azerbaijan

== B ==
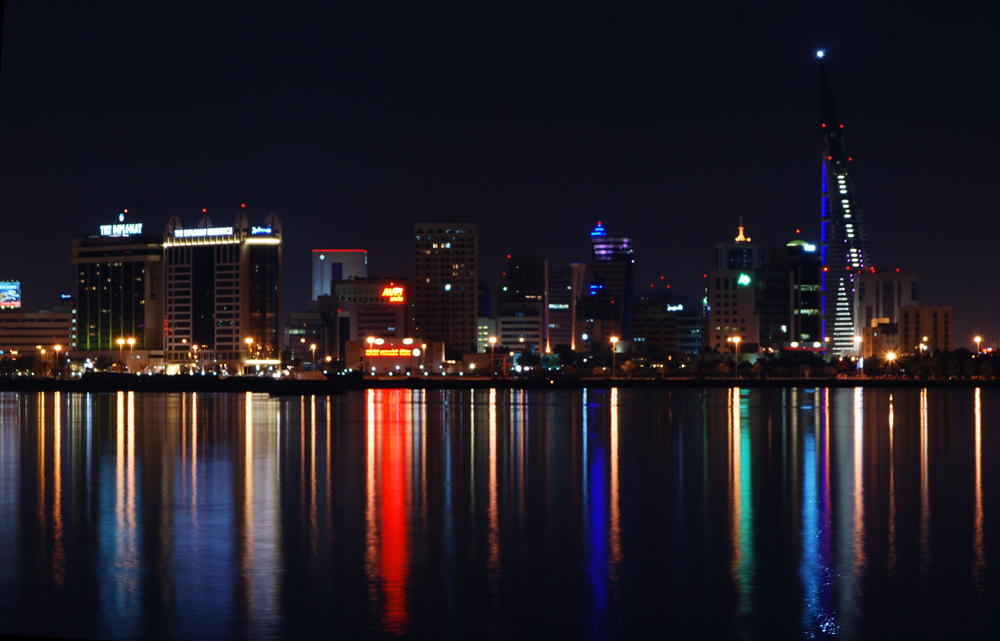
List of cities in Bahrain

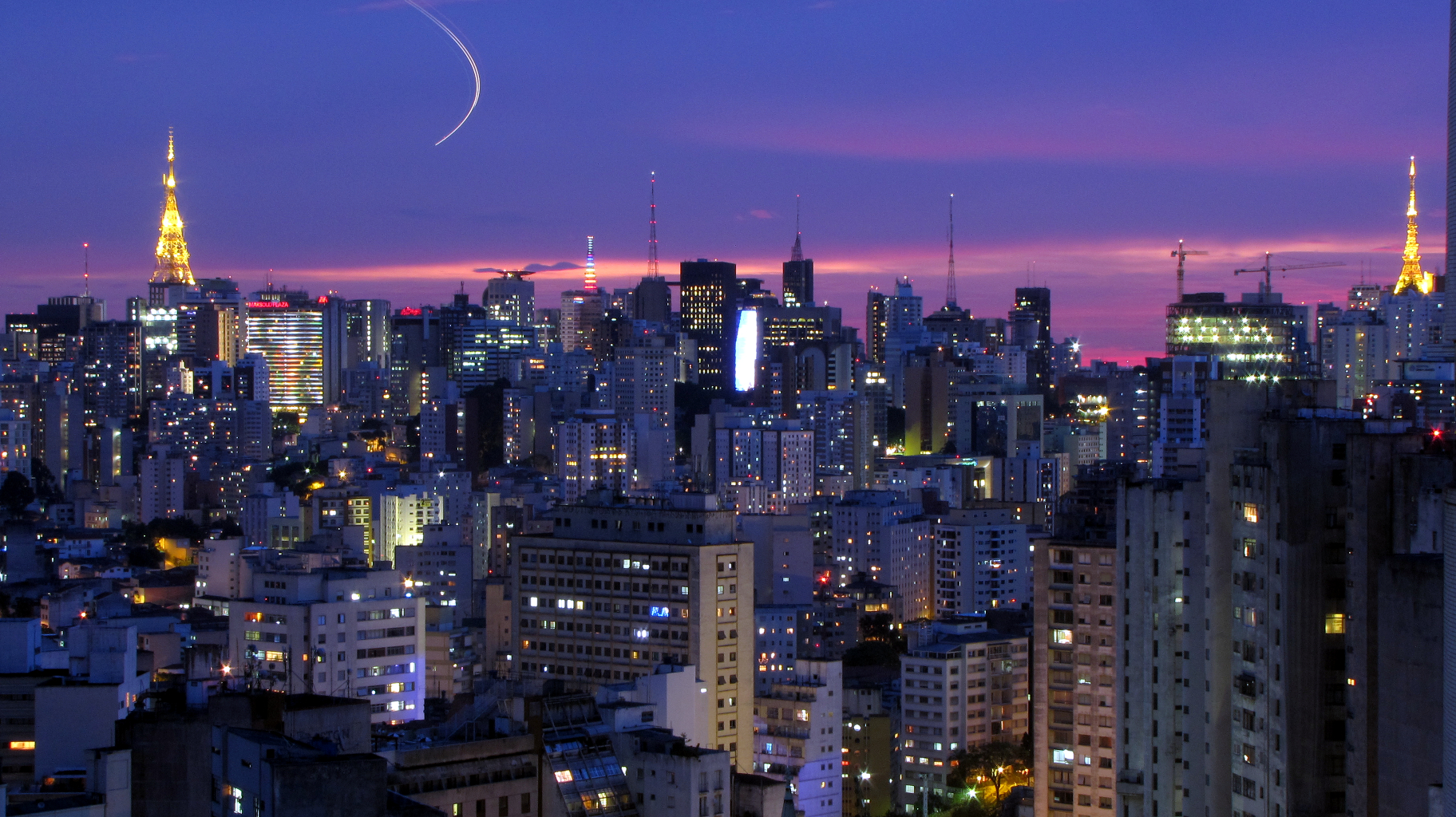
List of cities in Brazil

- **List of cities in the Bahamas** - Commonwealth of The Bahamas
- **List of cities in Bahrain** - Kingdom of Bahrain
- **List of cities in Bangladesh** - People's Republic of Bangladesh
- **List of cities in Barbados** - Barbados
- **List of cities in Belarus** - Republic of Belarus
- **List of cities in Belgium** - Kingdom of Belgium
- **List of cities of Belize** - Belize
- **List of cities in Benin** - Republic of Benin
- **List of cities in Bhutan** - Kingdom of Bhutan
- **List of cities in Bolivia** - Plurinational State of Bolivia
- **List of cities in Bosnia and Herzegovina** - Bosnia and Herzegovina
- **List of cities in Botswana** - Republic of Botswana
- **List of cities in Brazil** - Federative Republic of Brazil
- **List of cities in Brunei** - State of Brunei Darussalam
- **List of cities in Bulgaria** - Republic of Bulgaria
- **List of cities in Burkina Faso** - Burkina Faso
- **List of cities in Burundi** - Republic of Burundi

== C ==
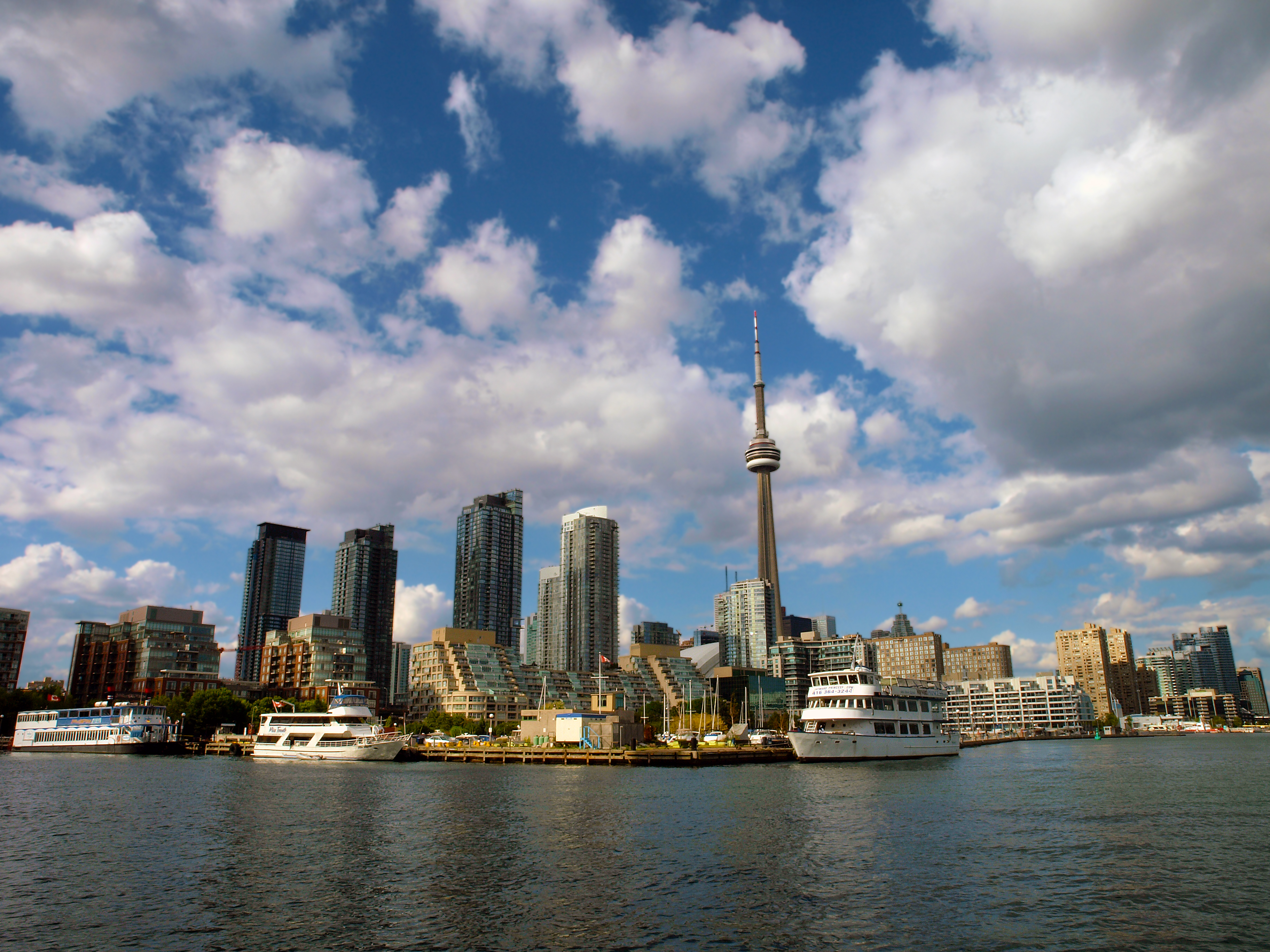
List of cities in Canada

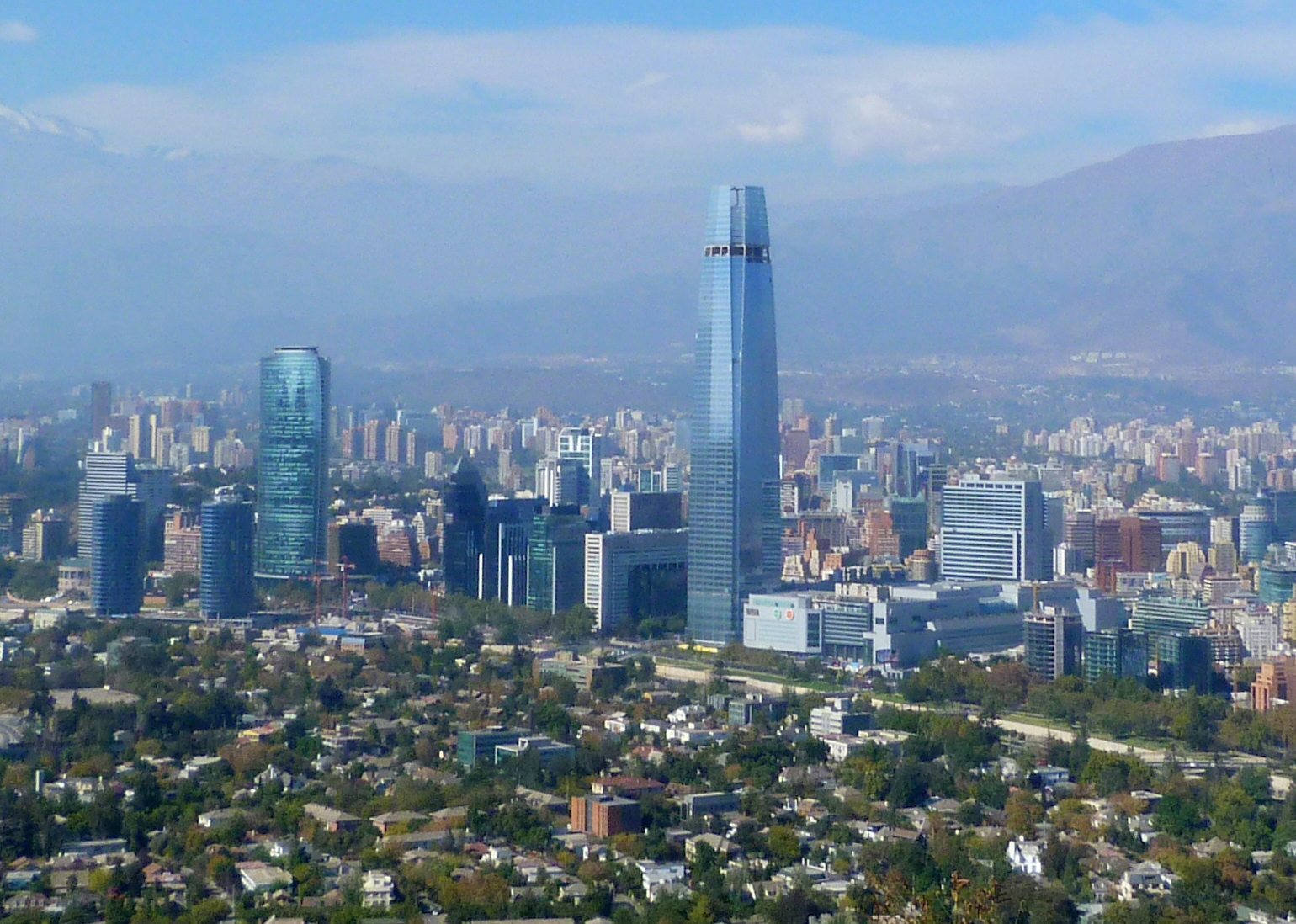
List of cities in Chile

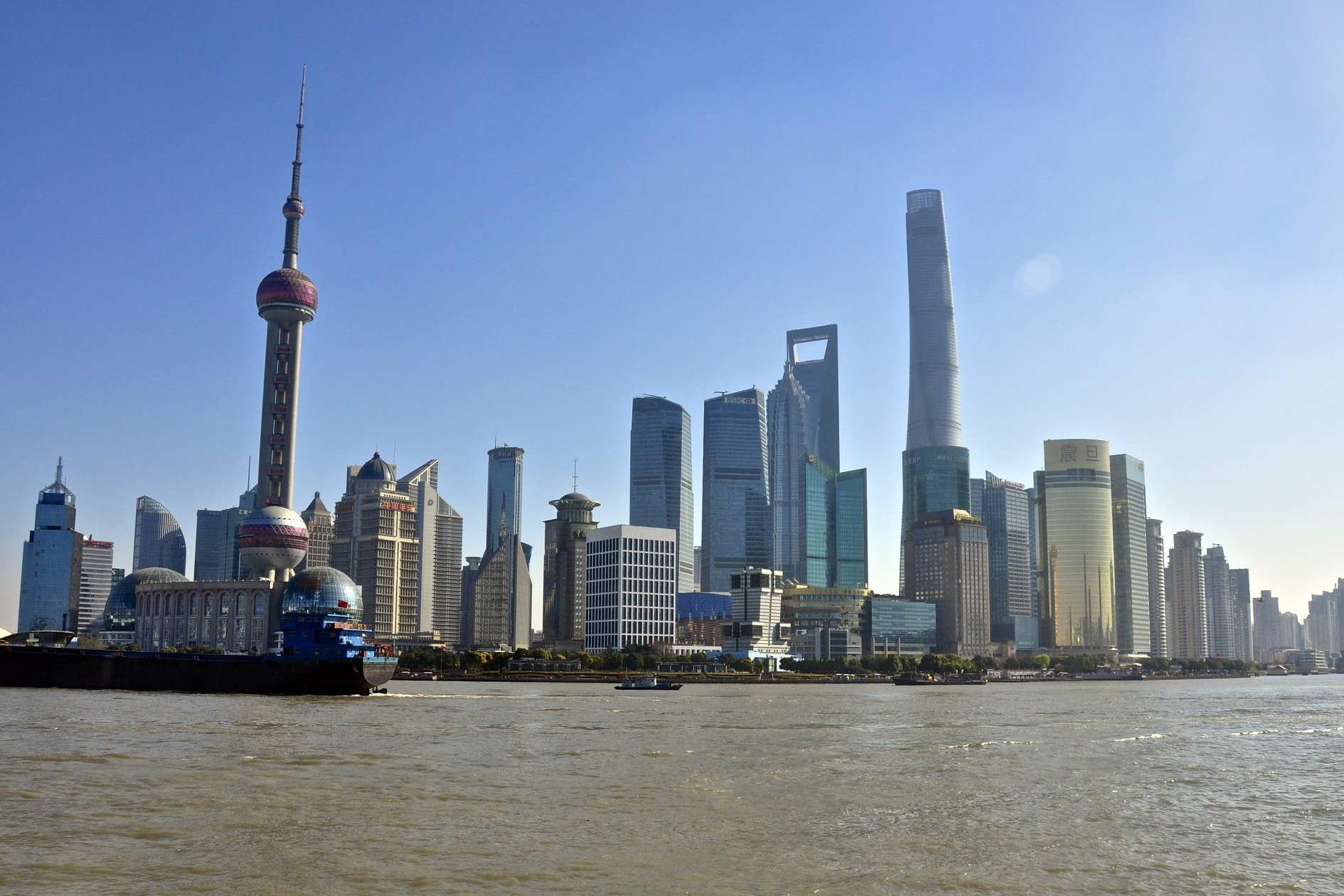
List of cities in China

- **List of cities in Cambodia** - Kingdom of Cambodia
- **List of cities in Cameroon** - Republic of Cameroon
- **List of cities in Canada** - Canada
- **List of cities in Cape Verde** - Republic of Cape Verde
- **List of cities in the Cayman Islands** - Cayman Islands (UK overseas territory)
- **List of cities in the Central African Republic** - Central African Republic
- **List of cities in Chad** - Republic of Chad
- **List of cities in Chile** - Republic of Chile
- **List of cities in China** - People's Republic of China
- **List of cities in Colombia** - Republic of Colombia
- **List of cities in Comoros** - Union of the Comoros
- **List of cities in the Democratic Republic of the Congo** - Democratic Republic of the Congo
- **List of cities in the Republic of the Congo** - Republic of the Congo
- **List of cities in Costa Rica** - Republic of Costa Rica
- (Ivory Coast) **List of cities in Côte d'Ivoire** - Republic of Côte d'Ivoire
- **List of cities in Croatia** - Republic of Croatia
- **List of cities in Cuba** - Republic of Cuba
- **List of cities in Cyprus** - Republic of Cyprus
- **List of cities in the Czech Republic** - Czech Republic

== D ==
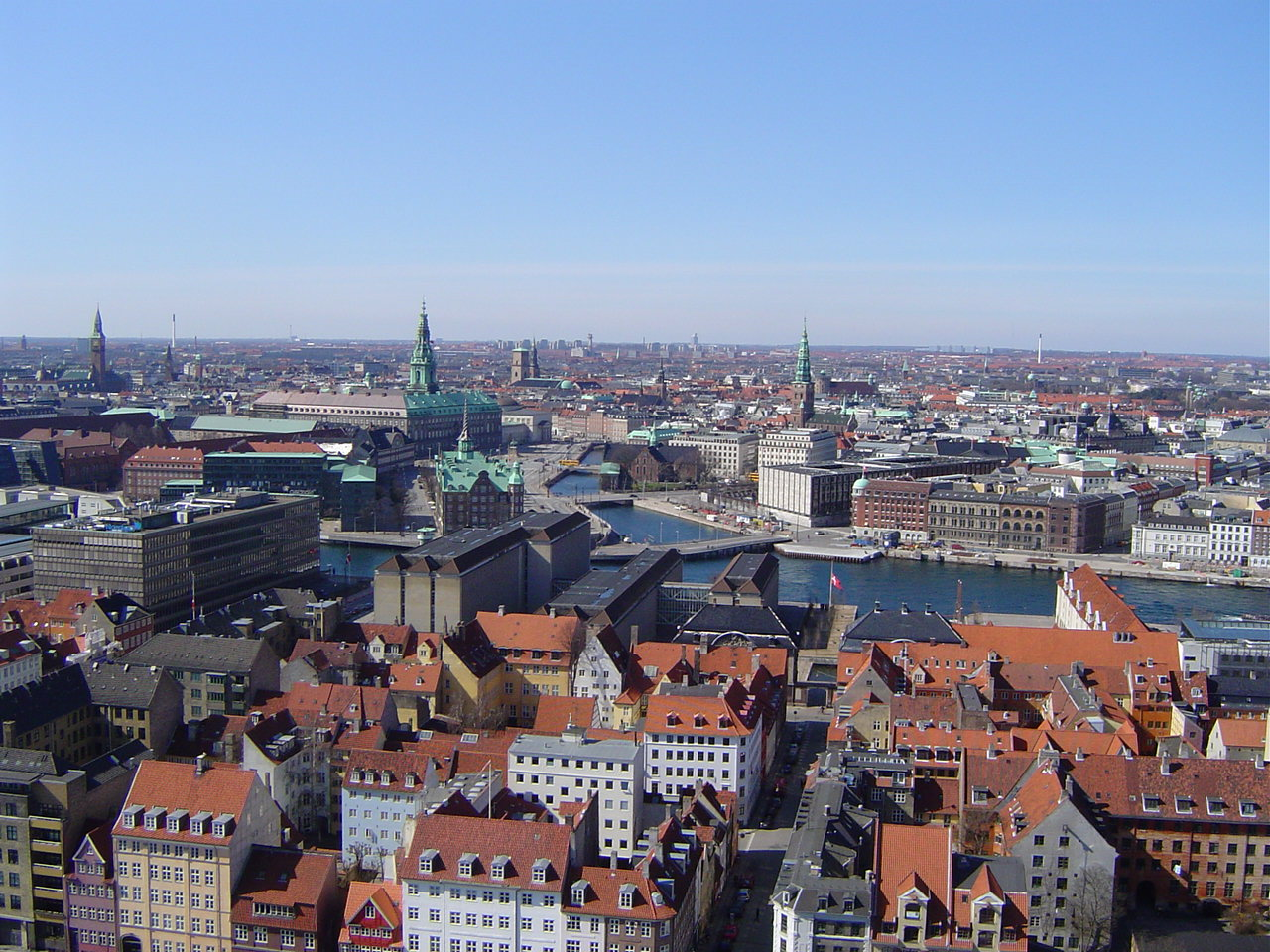
List of cities in Denmark

- **List of cities in Denmark** - Kingdom of Denmark
- **List of cities in Djibouti** - Republic of Djibouti
- **List of cities in Dominica** - Commonwealth of Dominica
- **List of cities in the Dominican Republic** - Dominican Republic

== E ==
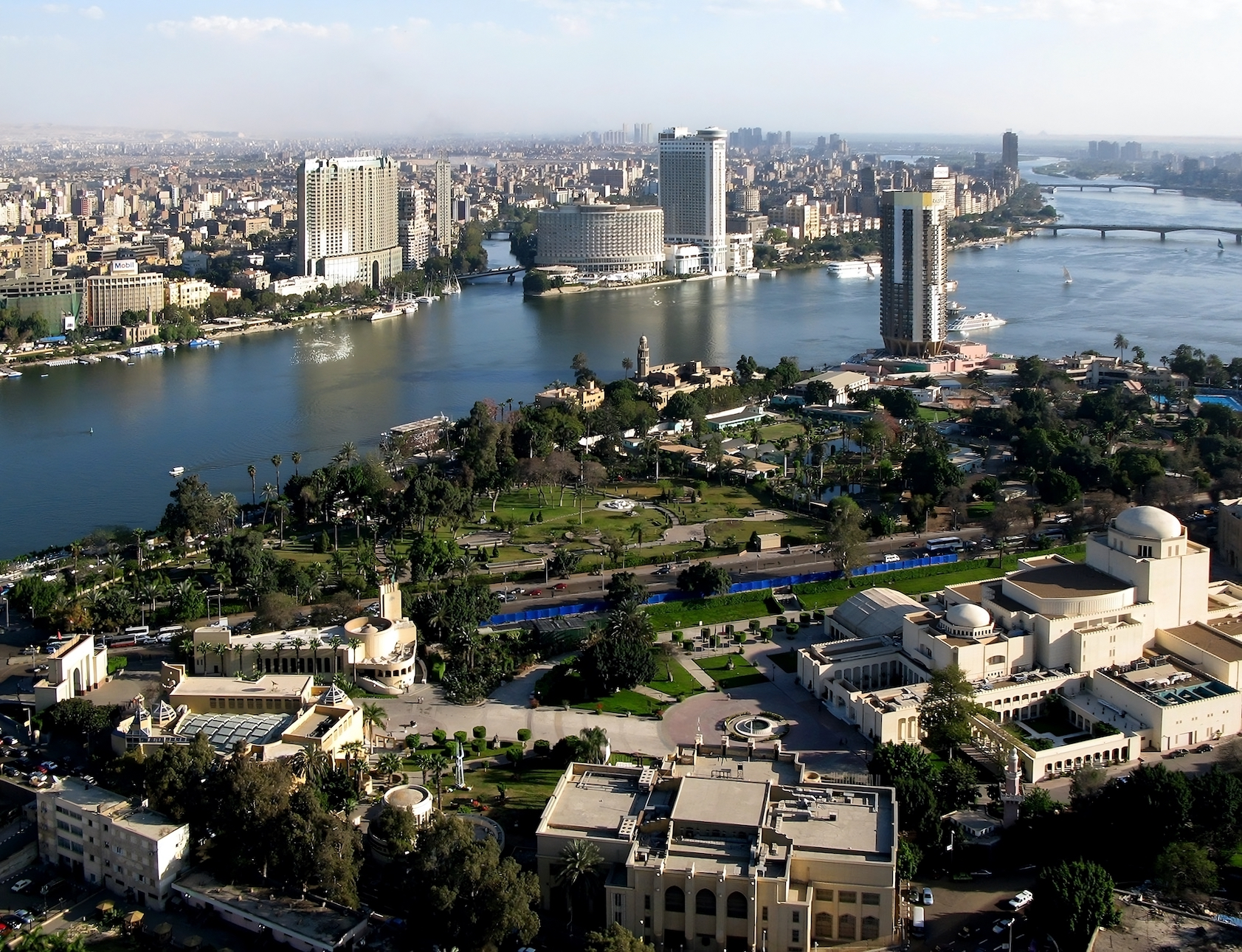
List of cities in Egypt

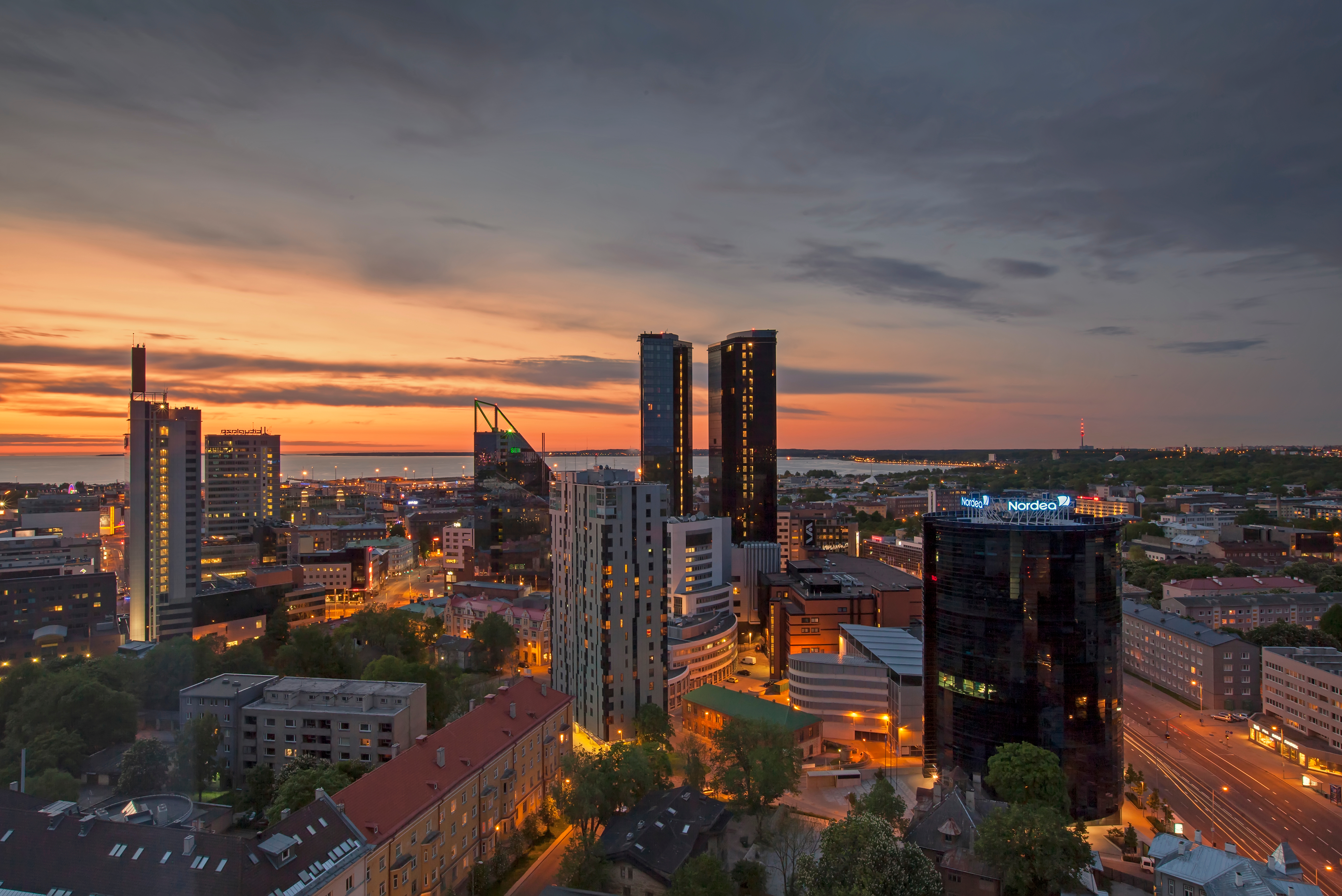
List of cities in Estonia

- **List of cities in East Timor (Timor-Leste)** - Democratic Republic of Timor-Leste
- **List of cities in Ecuador** - Republic of Ecuador
- **List of cities in Egypt** - Arab Republic of Egypt
- **List of cities in El Salvador** - Republic of El Salvador
- **List of cities in Equatorial Guinea** - Republic of Equatorial Guinea
- **List of cities in Eritrea** - State of Eritrea
- **List of cities in Estonia** - Republic of Estonia
- **List of cities in Eswatini (Swaziland)** - Kingdom of Eswatini
- **List of cities in Ethiopia** - Federal Democratic Republic of Ethiopia

== F ==
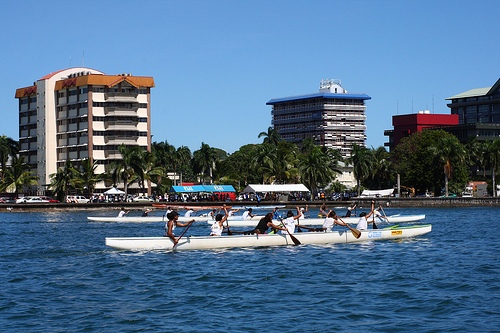
List of cities in Fiji

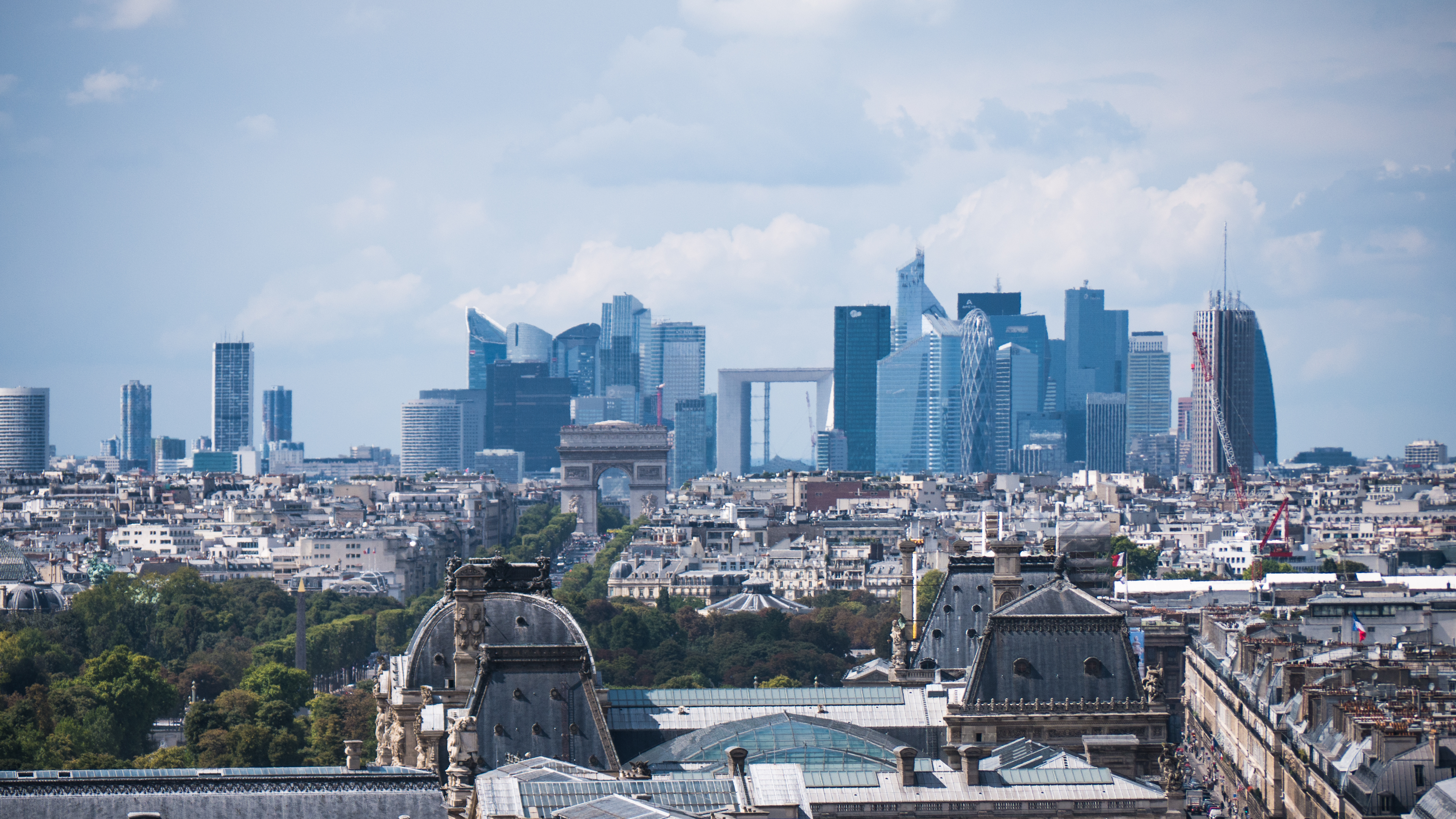
List of cities in France

- **List of cities in the Falkland Islands** - Falkland Islands (British overseas territories)
- **List of cities in the Faroe Islands** - Faroe Islands (Self-governing country in the Kingdom of Denmark)
- **List of cities in Fiji** - Republic of the Fiji Islands
- **List of cities in Finland** - Republic of Finland
- **List of cities in France** - French Republic
- **List of cities in French Guiana** - French Guiana (French overseas community)
- **List of cities in French Polynesia** - French Polynesia (French overseas community)

== G ==
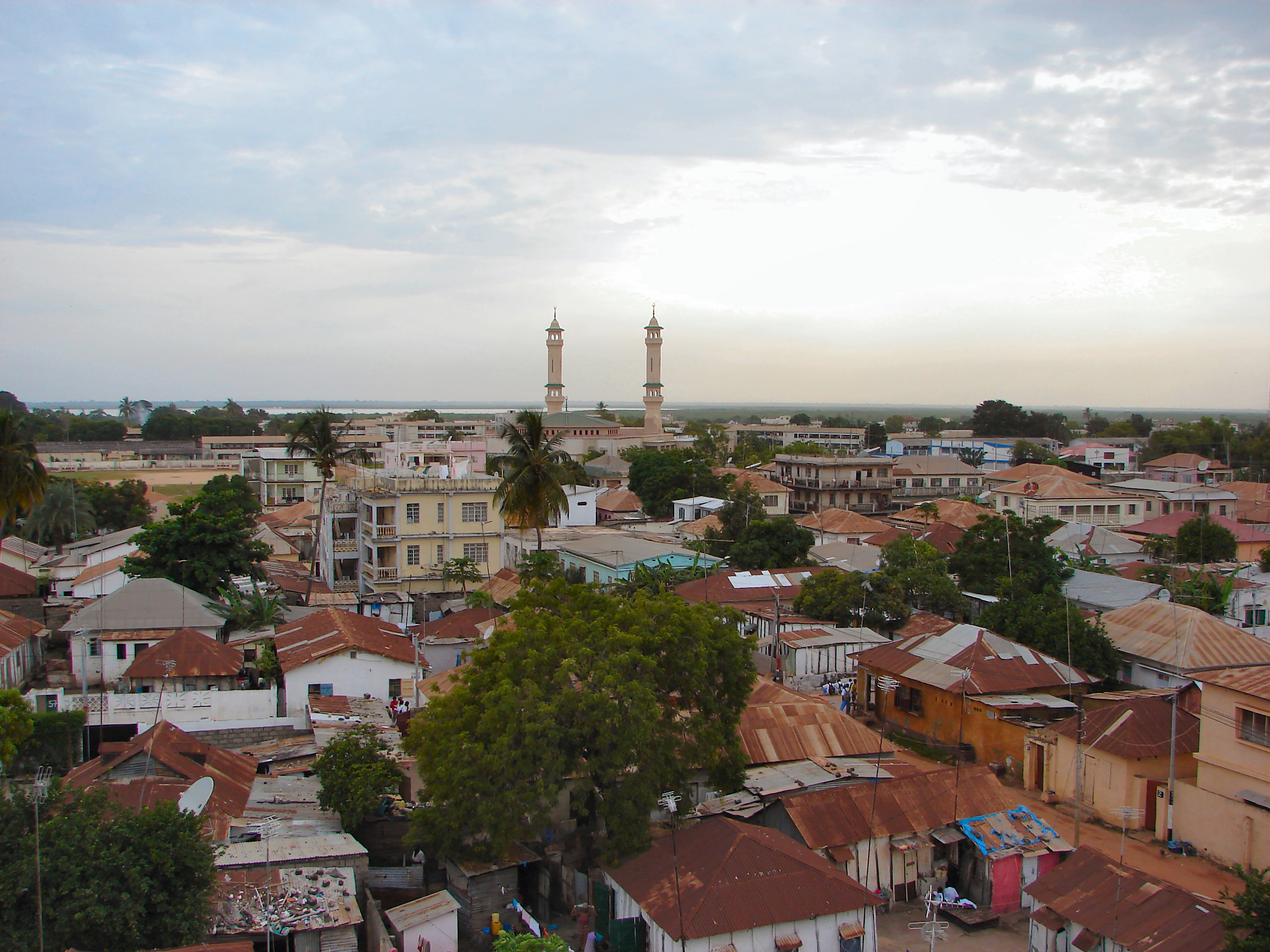
List of cities in Gambia

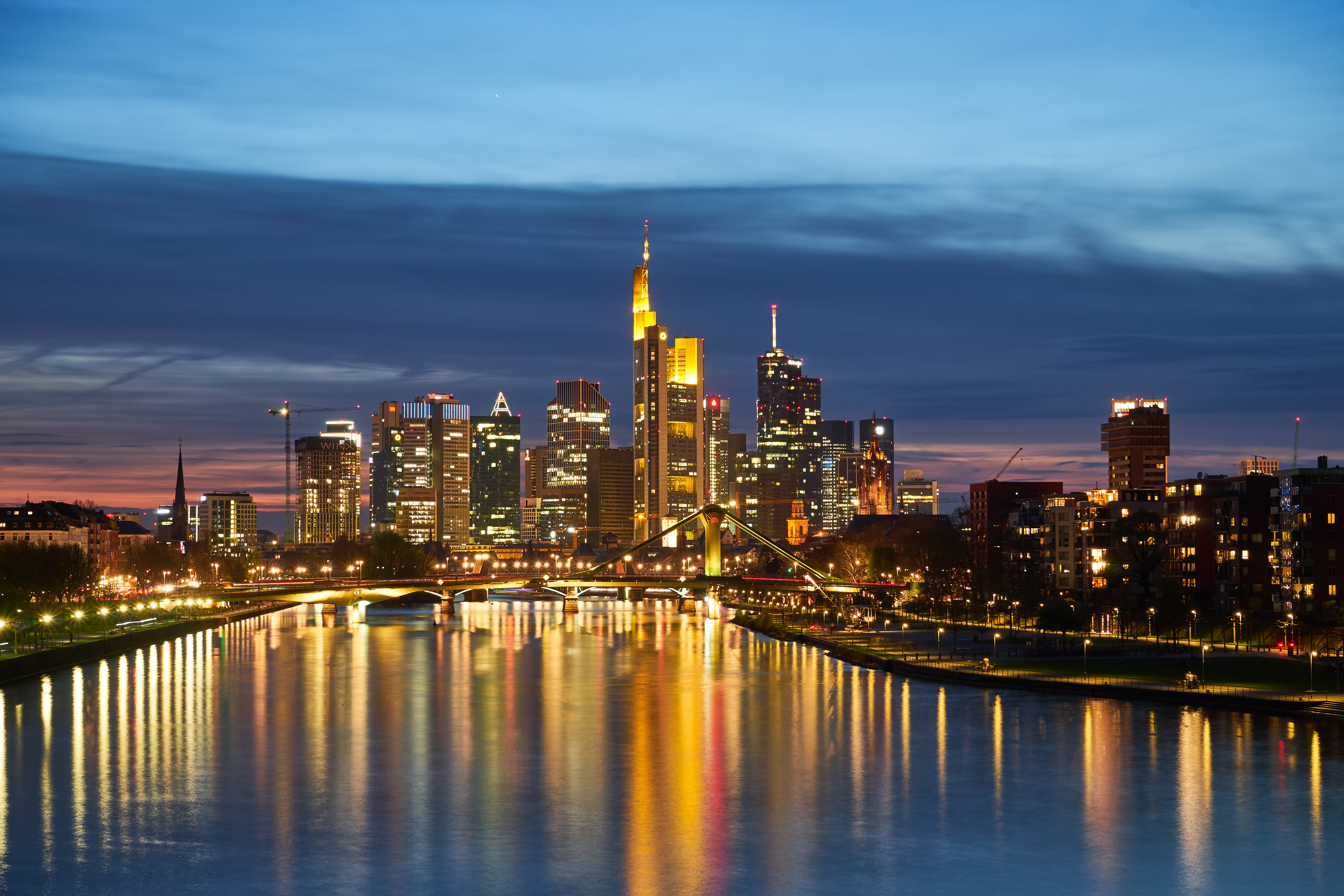
List of cities in Germany

- **List of cities in Gabon** - Gabonese Republic
- **List of cities in the Gambia** - Republic of The Gambia
- See List of cities in Palestinian Authority areas for Gaza Strip
- (Georgia (country)) **List of cities in Georgia** - Georgia
- **List of cities in Germany** - Federal Republic of Germany
- **List of cities in Ghana** - Republic of Ghana
- **List of cities in Gibraltar** - Gibraltar (UK overseas territory)
- **List of cities in Greece** - Hellenic Republic
- **List of cities in Greenland** - Greenland (Self-governing country in the Kingdom of Denmark)
- **List of cities in Grenada** - Grenada
- **List of cities in Guadeloupe** - Guadeloupe (French overseas community)
- **List of cities in Guam** - Territory of Guam (US overseas territory)
- **List of cities in Guatemala** - Republic of Guatemala
- **List of cities in Guinea** - Republic of Guinea
- **List of cities in Guinea-Bissau** - Republic of Guinea-Bissau
- **List of cities in Guyana** - Co-operative Republic of Guyana

== H ==
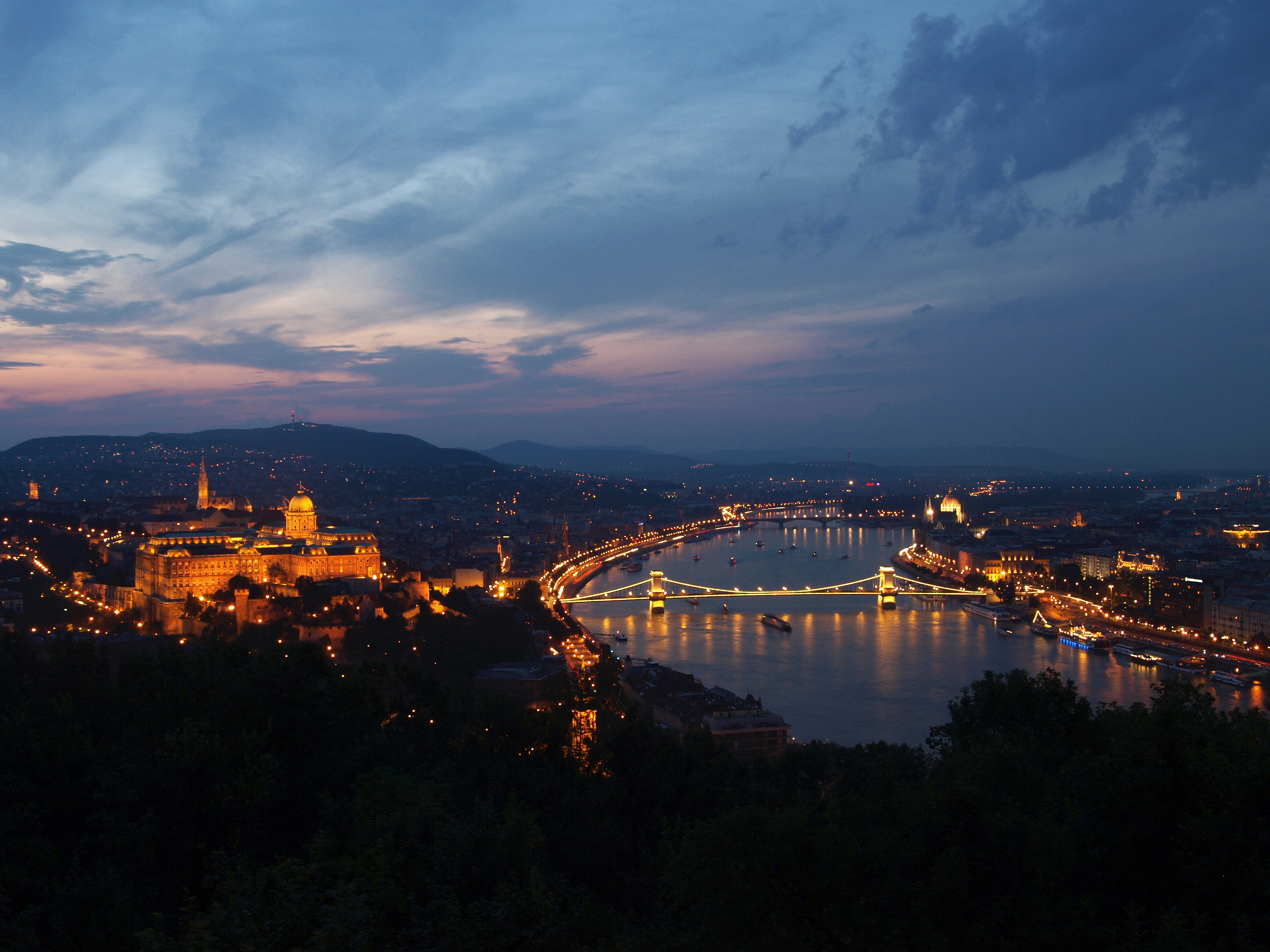
List of cities in Hungary

- **List of cities in Haiti** - Republic of Haiti
- **List of cities in Honduras** - Republic of Honduras
- **List of cities in Hong Kong** - Hong Kong Special Administrative Region of the People's Republic of China (Area of special sovereignty)
- **List of cities in Hungary** - Republic of Hungary

== I ==
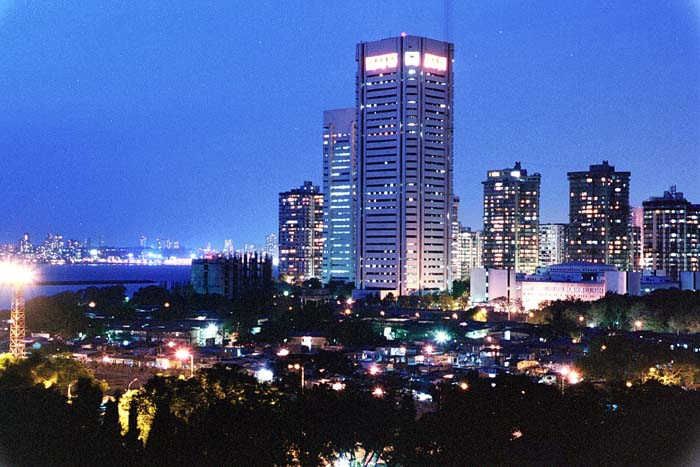
List of cities in India

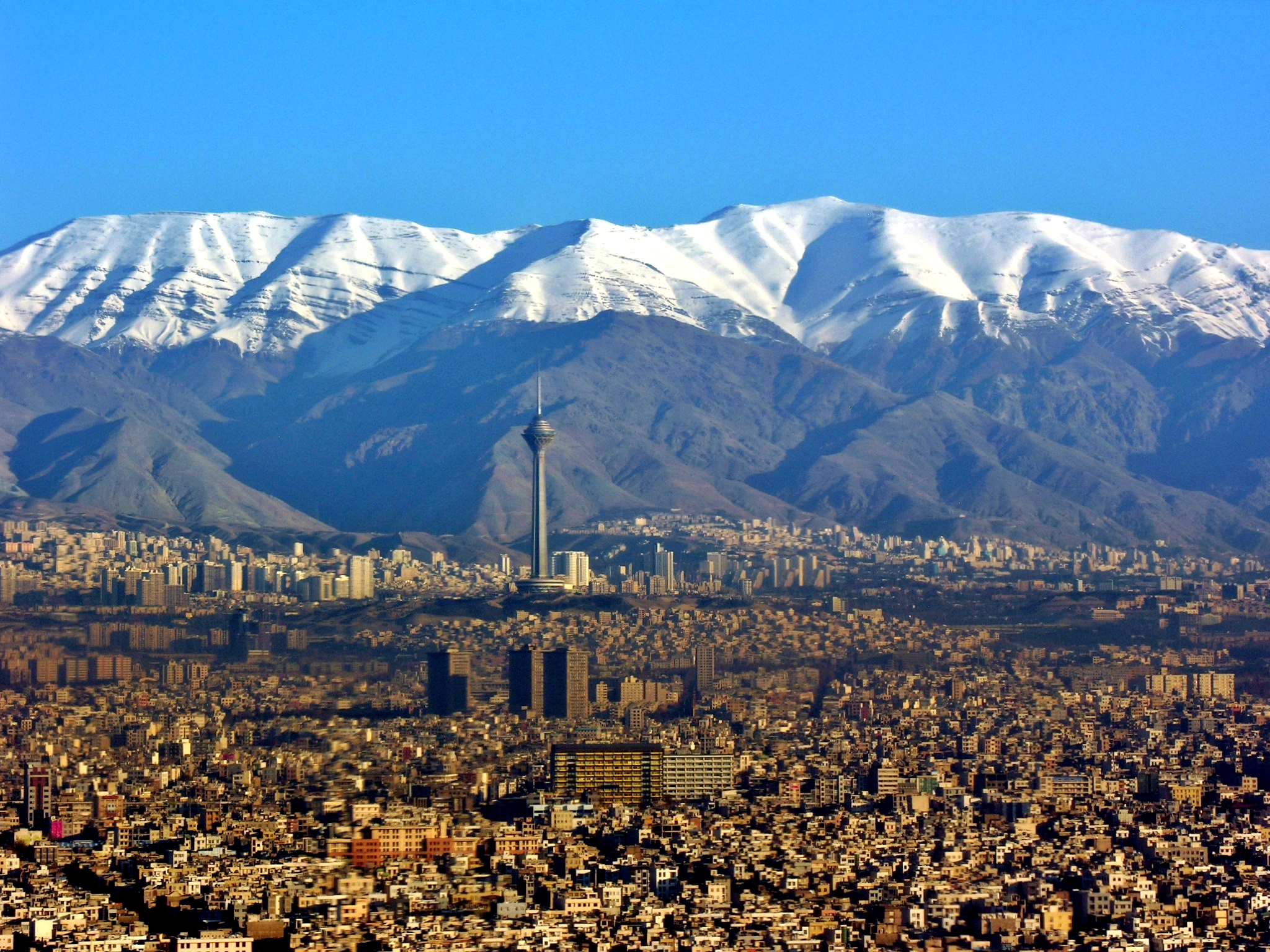
List of cities in Iran

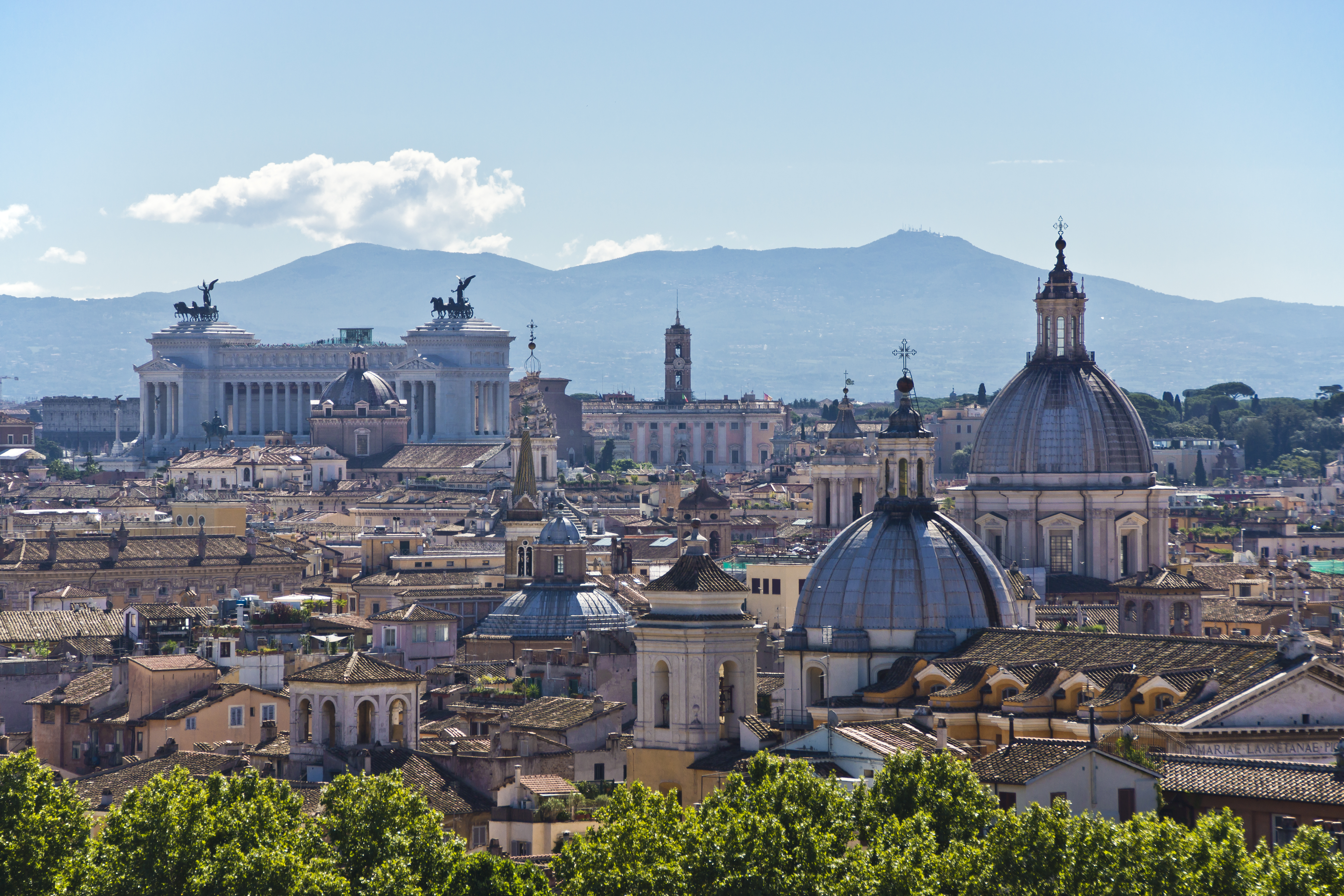
List of cities in Italy

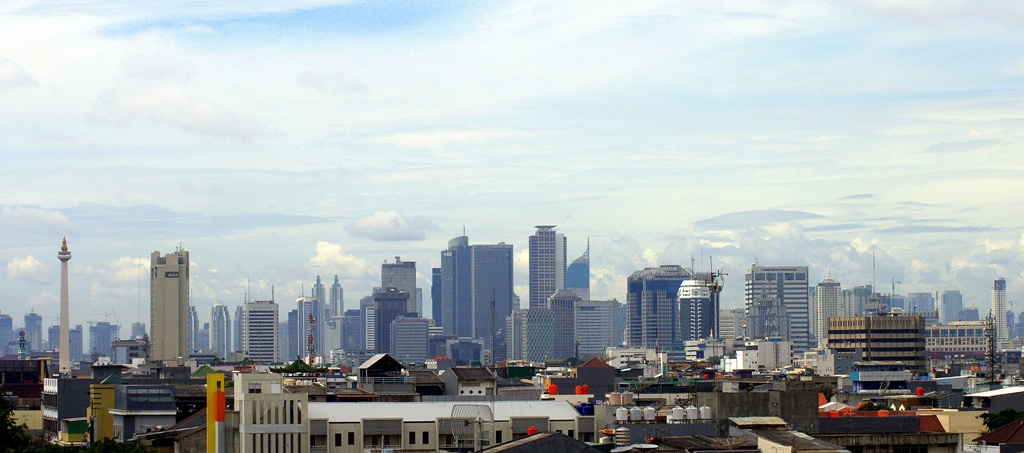
List of cities in Indonesia

- **List of cities in Iceland** - Republic of Iceland
- **List of cities in India** - Republic of India
- **List of cities in Indonesia** - Republic of Indonesia
- **List of cities in Iran** - Islamic Republic of Iran
- **List of cities in Iraq** - Republic of Iraq
- (Republic of Ireland) **List of cities in Ireland** - Ireland
- See List of cities in the Falkland Islands for Islas Malvinas
- **List of cities in the Isle of Man** - Isle of Man (British Crown dependency)
- **List of cities in Israel** - State of Israel
- **List of cities in Italy** - Italian Republic

== J ==
List of cities in Japan

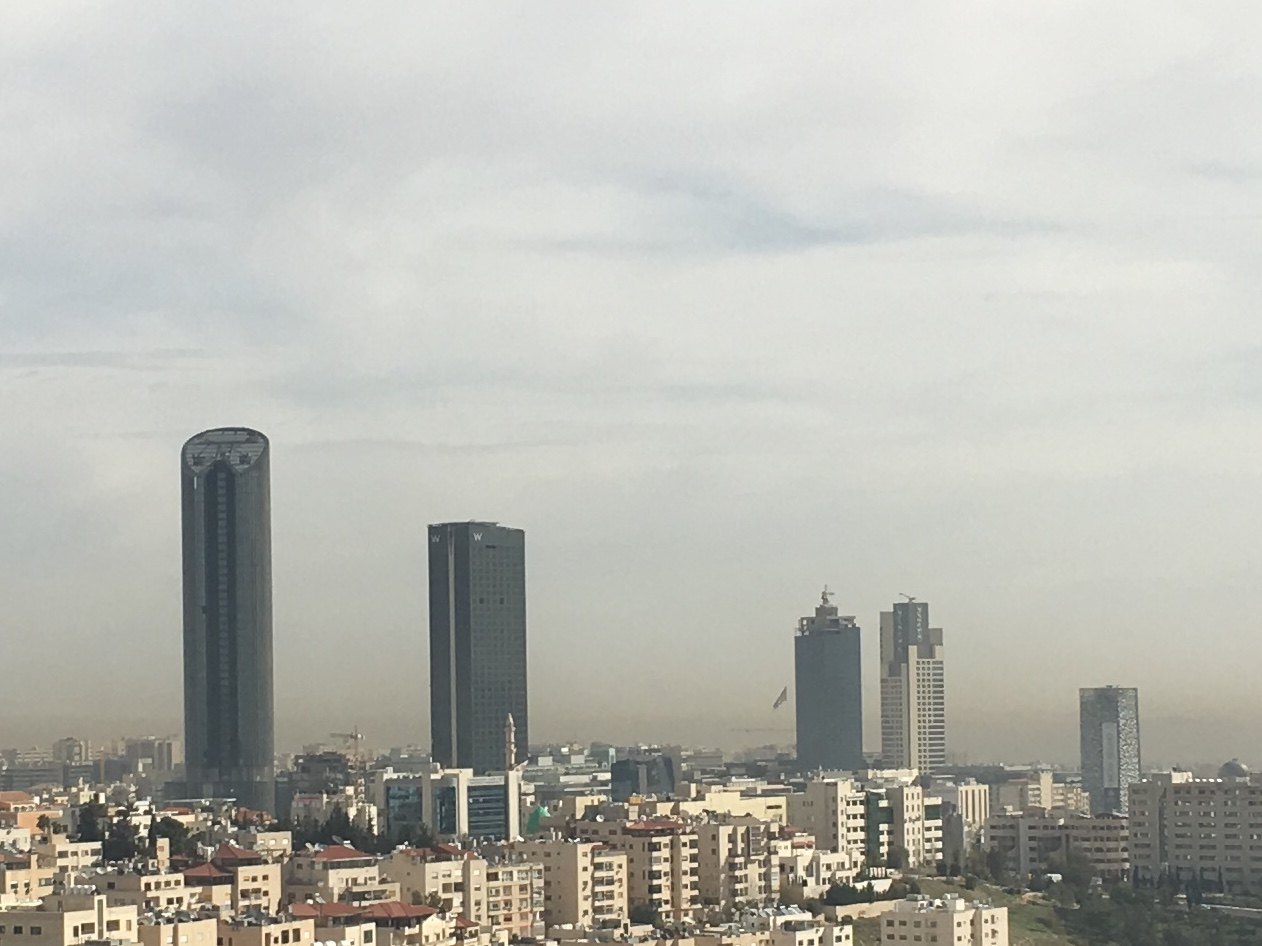
List of cities in Jordan

- **List of cities in Jamaica** - Jamaica
- **List of cities in Japan** - Japan
- **List of parishes in Jersey** - Jersey (British crown dependency)
- **List of cities in Jordan** - Hashemite Kingdom of Jordan

== K ==
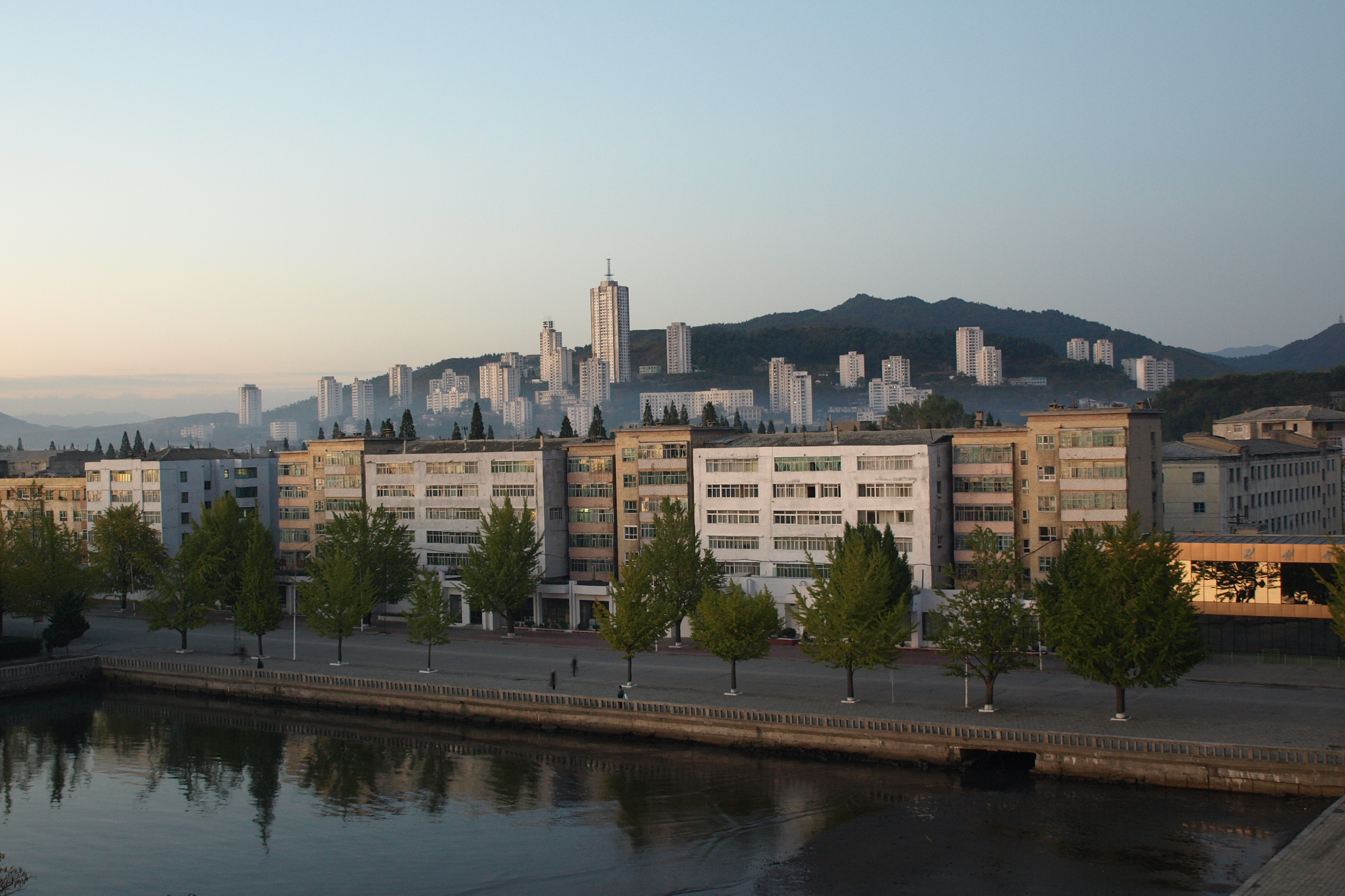
List of cities in North Korea

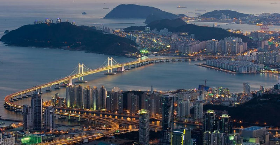
List of cities in South Korea

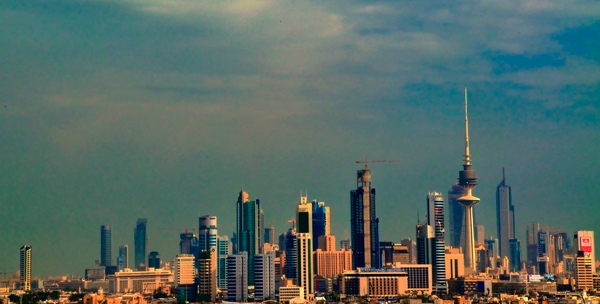
List of cities in Kuwait

- **List of cities in Kazakhstan** - Republic of Kazakhstan
- **List of cities in Kenya** - Republic of Kenya
- **List of cities in Kiribati** - Republic of Kiribati
- **List of cities in North Korea** - Democratic People's Republic of Korea
- **List of cities in South Korea (Republic of)** - Republic of Korea
- **List of cities in Kosovo** - Kosovo Republic
- **List of cities in Kuwait** - State of Kuwait
- **List of cities in Kyrgyzstan** - Kyrgyz Republic

== L ==
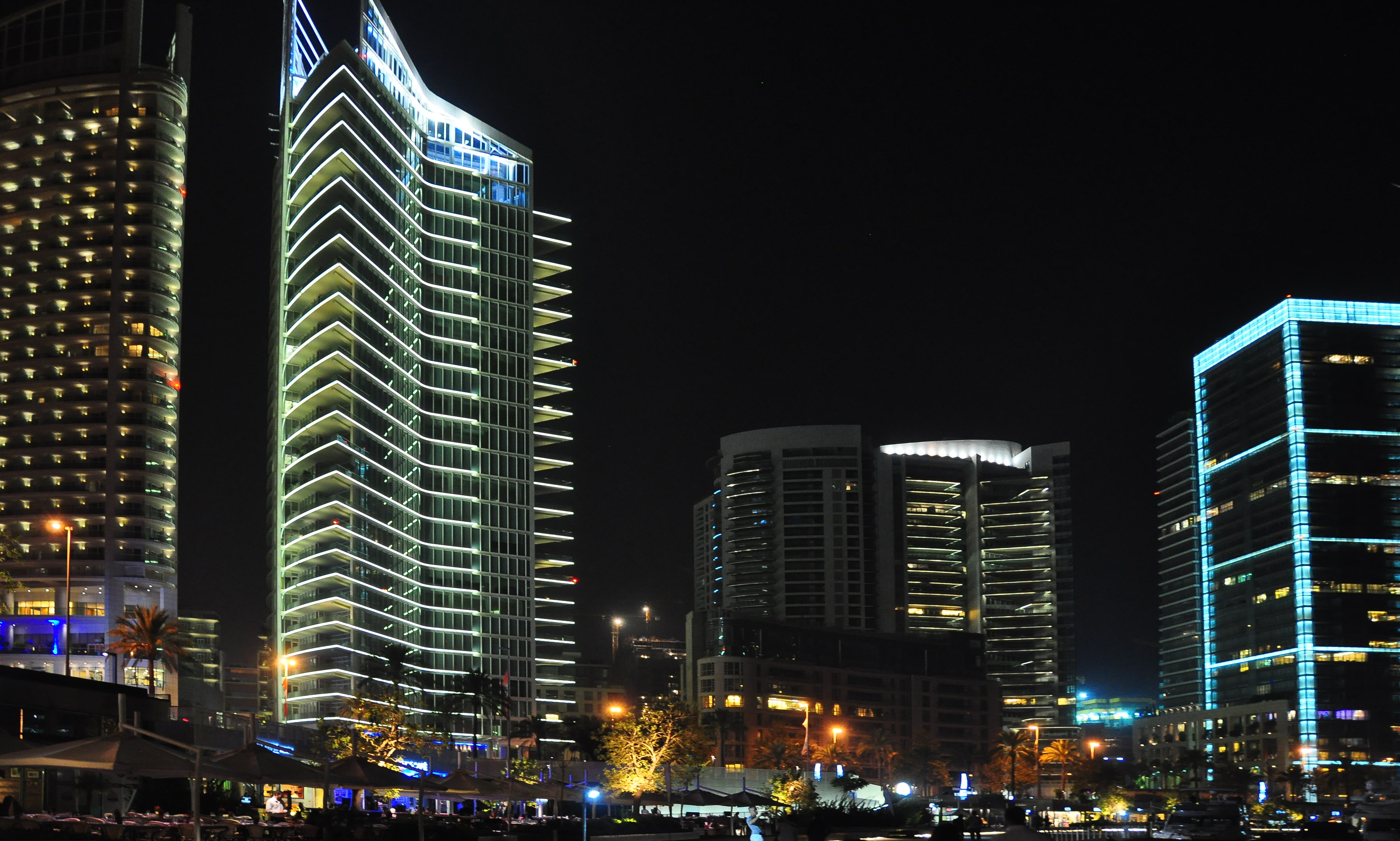
List of cities in Lebanon

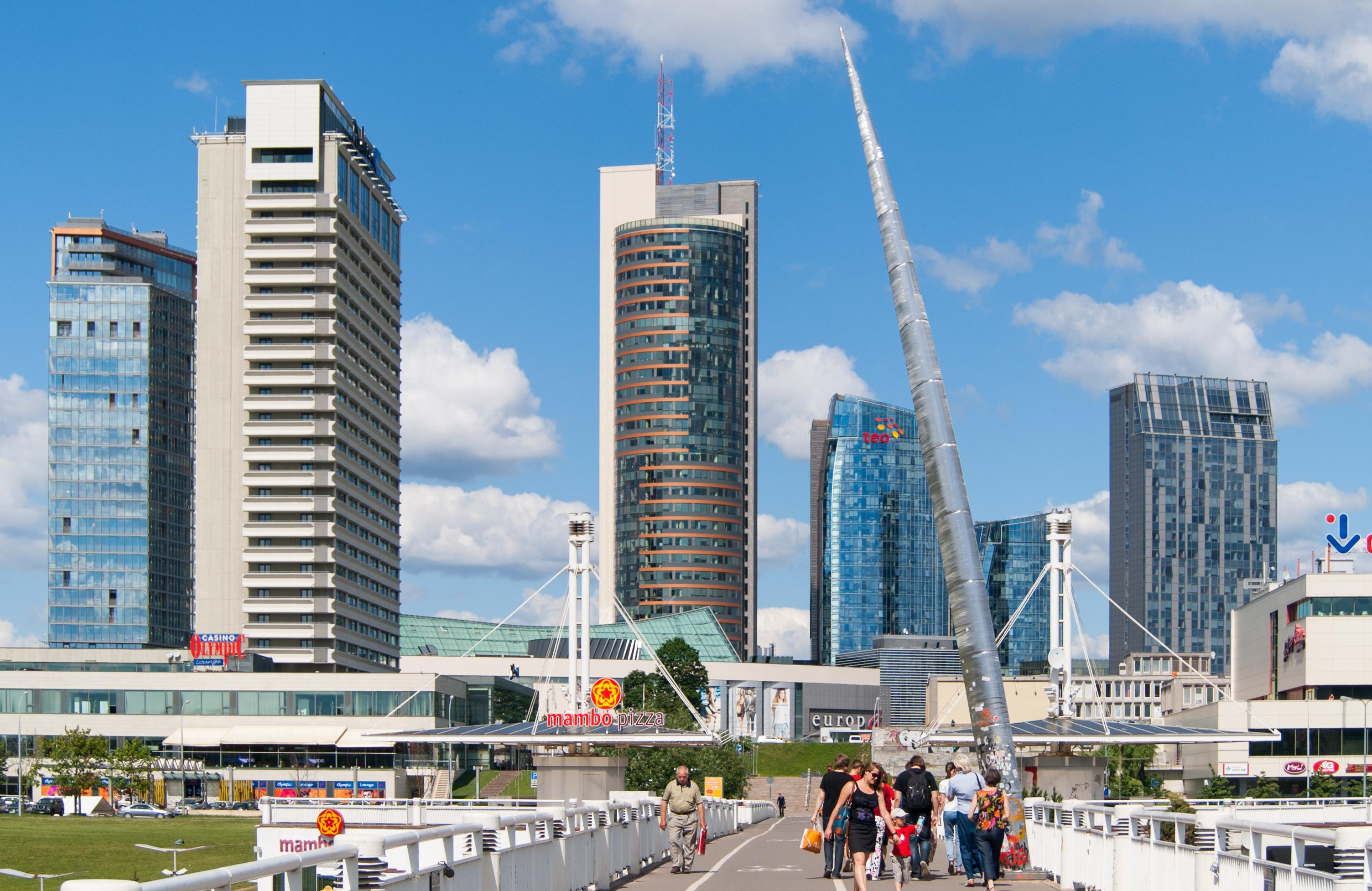
List of cities in Lithuania

- **List of cities in Laos** - Lao People's Democratic Republic
- **List of cities in Latvia** - Republic of Latvia
- **List of cities in Lebanon** - Republic of Lebanon
- **List of cities in Lesotho** - Kingdom of Lesotho
- **List of cities in Liberia** - Republic of Liberia
- **List of cities in Libya** - Great Socialist People's Libyan Arab Jamahiriya
- **List of cities in Liechtenstein** - Principality of Liechtenstein
- **List of cities in Lithuania** - Republic of Lithuania
- **List of cities in Luxembourg** - Grand Duchy of Luxembourg

== M ==
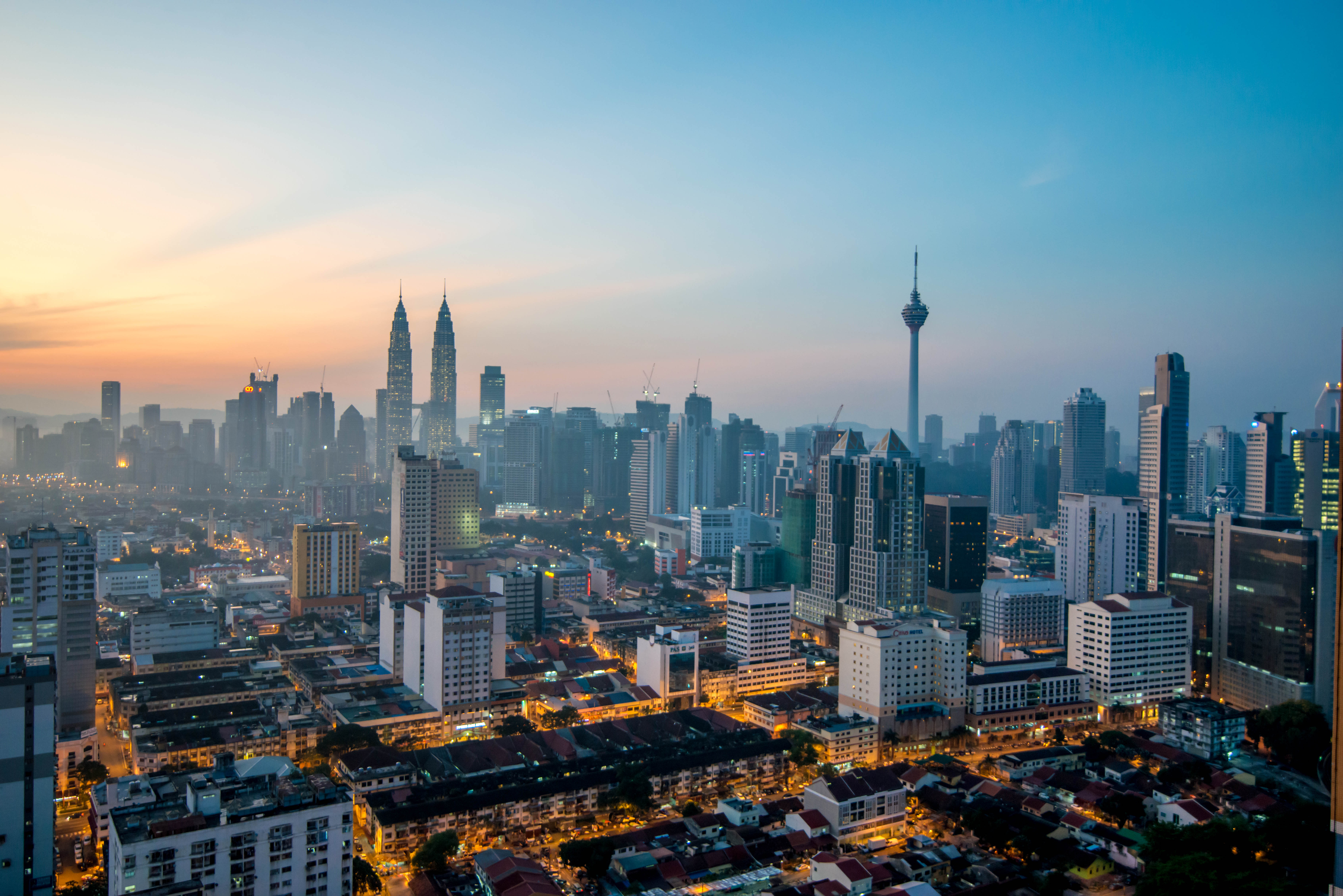
List of cities in Malaysia

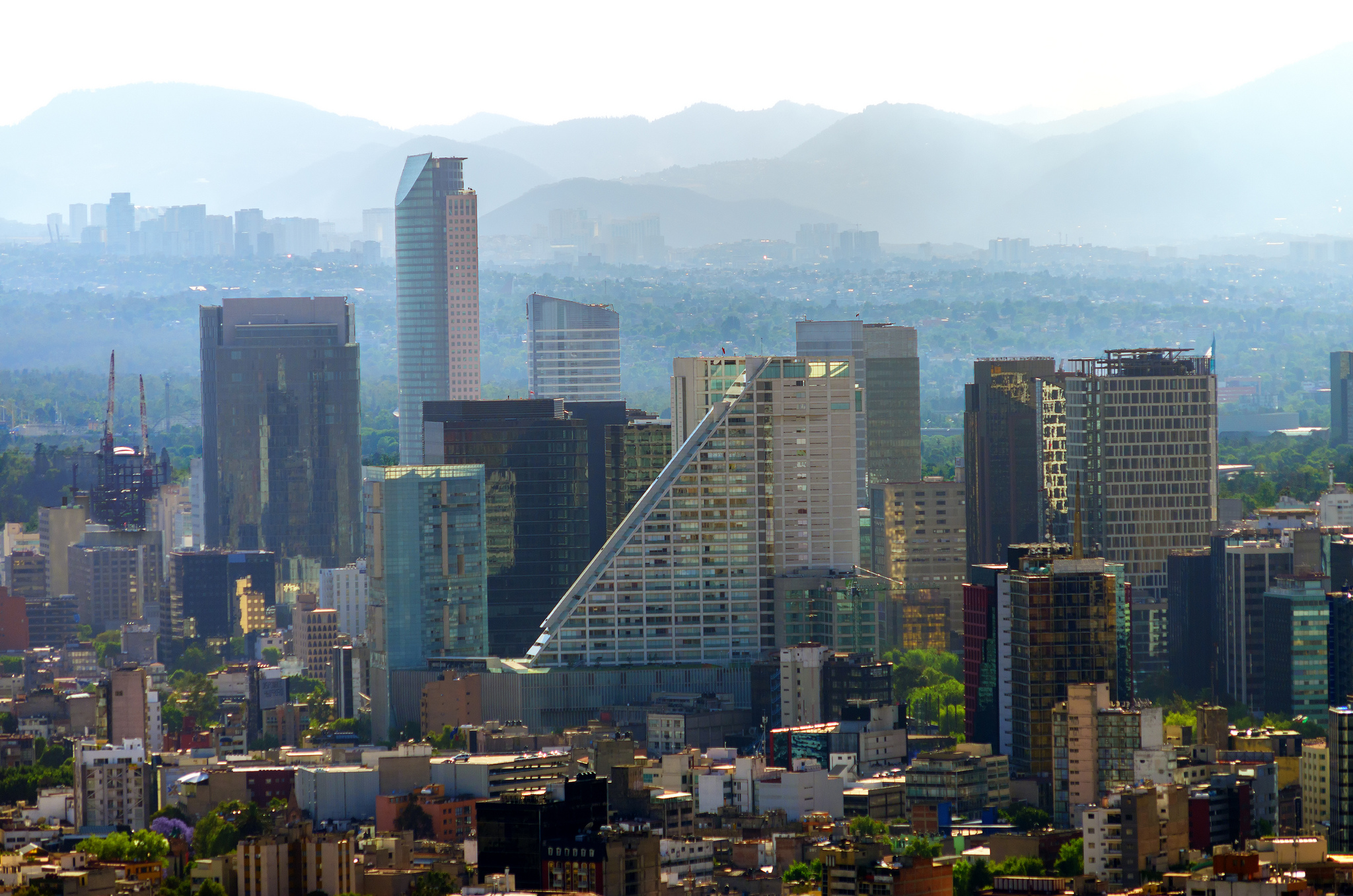
List of cities in Mexico

- **List of cities in Madagascar** - Republic of Madagascar
- **List of cities in Malawi** - Republic of Malawi
- **List of cities in Malaysia** - Malaysia
- **List of cities in the Maldives** - Republic of Maldives
- **List of cities in Mali** - Republic of Mali
- **List of cities in Malta** - Republic of Malta
- **List of cities in the Marshall Islands** - Republic of the Marshall Islands
- **List of cities in Mauritania** - Islamic Republic of Mauritania
- **List of cities in Mauritius** - Republic of Mauritius
- **List of cities in Mayotte** - Mayotte (French overseas community)
- **List of cities in Mexico** - United Mexican States
- **List of cities in the Federated States of Micronesia** - Federated States of Micronesia
- **List of cities in Moldova** - Republic of Moldova
- **List of cities in Monaco** - Principality of Monaco
- **List of cities in Mongolia** - Mongolia
- **List of cities in Montenegro** - Republic of Montenegro
- **List of cities in Montserrat** - Montserrat (UK overseas territory)
- **List of cities in Morocco** - Kingdom of Morocco
- **List of cities in Mozambique** - Republic of Mozambique
- **List of cities in Myanmar** - Republic of the Union of Myanmar

== N ==
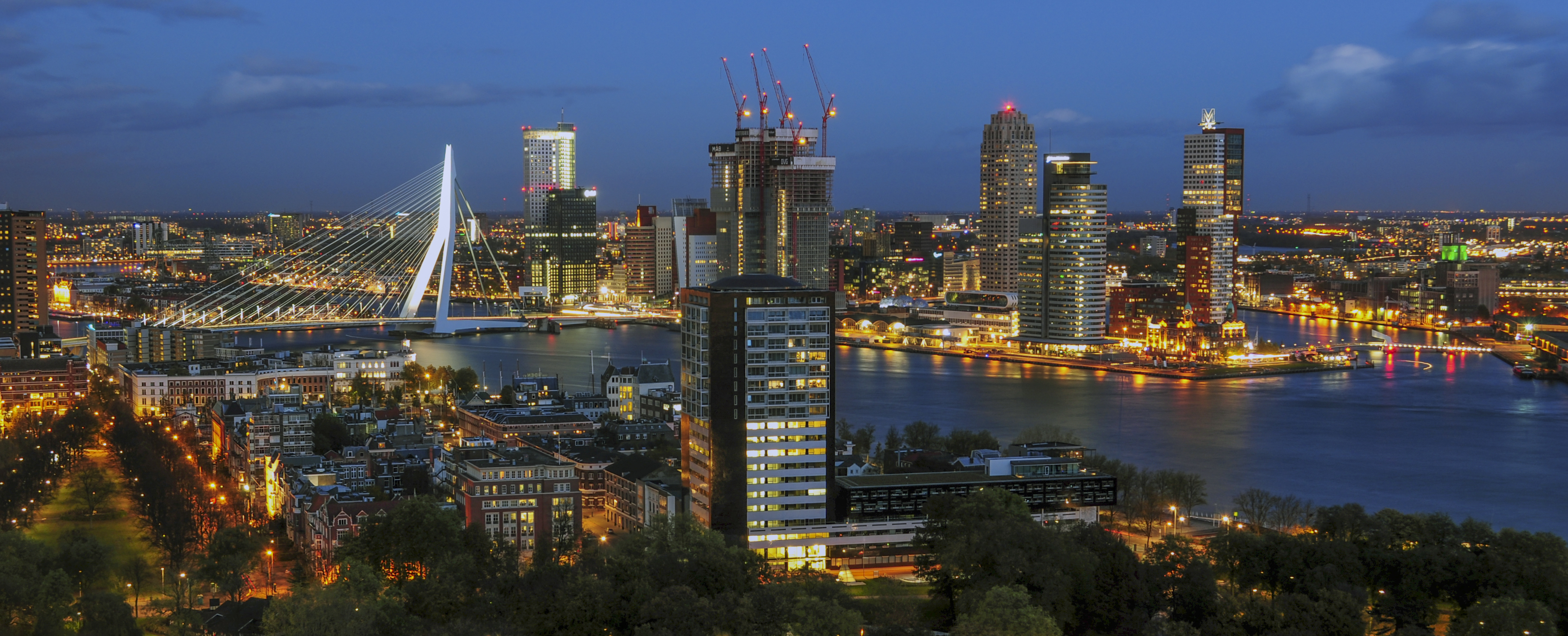
List of cities in the Netherlands

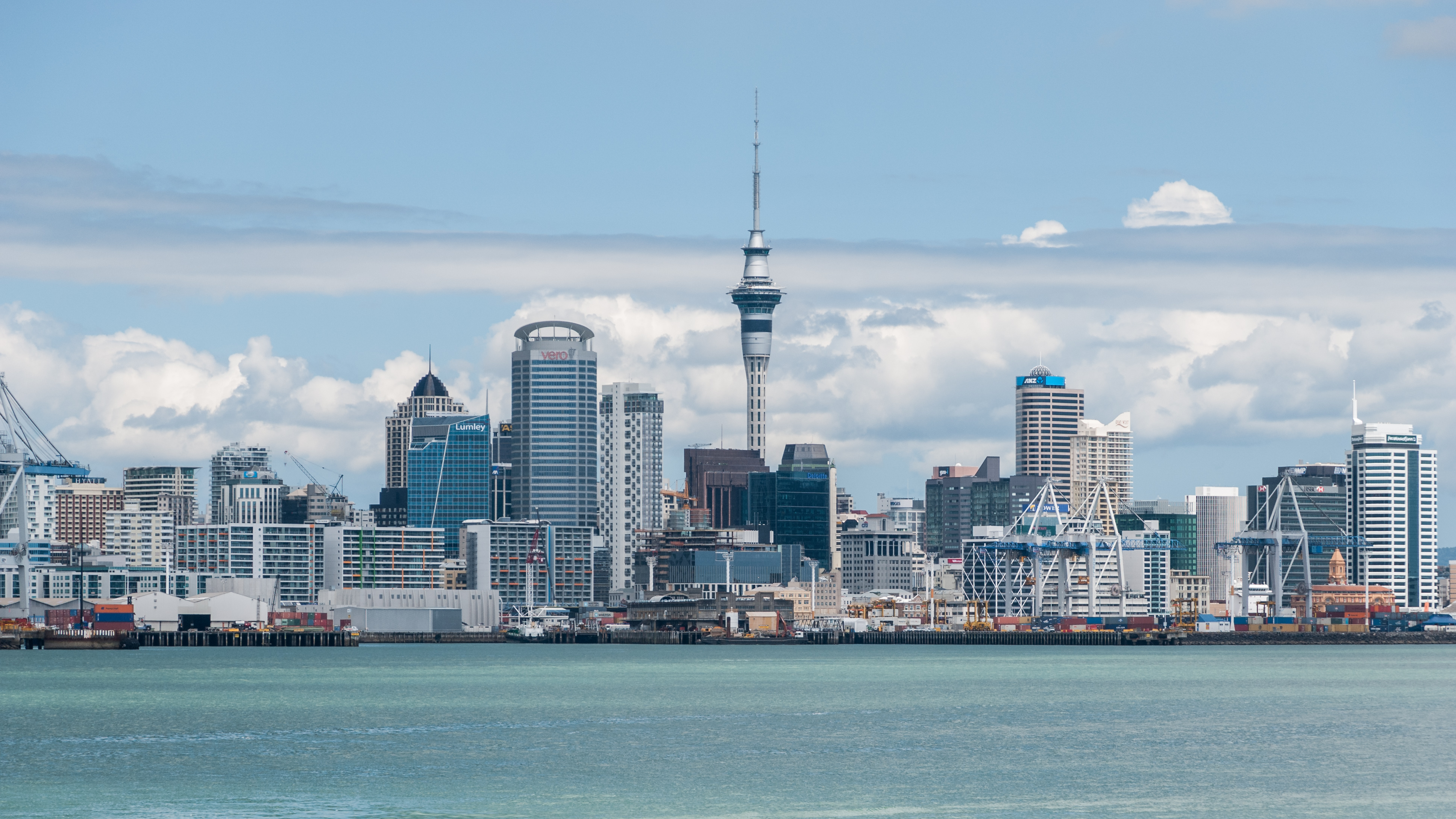
List of cities in New Zealand

- **List of cities in Namibia** - Republic of Namibia
- **List of cities in Nauru** - Republic of Nauru
- **List of cities in Nepal** - Federal Democratic Republic of Nepal
- **List of cities in the Netherlands** - Kingdom of the Netherlands
- **List of cities in the Netherlands Antilles** - Netherlands Antilles (Self-governing country in the Kingdom of the Netherlands)
- **List of cities in New Caledonia** - Territory of New Caledonia and Dependencies (French community sui generis)
- **List of cities in New Zealand** - New Zealand
- **List of cities in Nicaragua** - Republic of Nicaragua
- **List of cities in Niger** - Republic of Niger
- **List of cities in Nigeria** - Federal Republic of Nigeria
- **List of cities in Niue** - Niue (Associated state of New Zealand)
- **List of cities in the Northern Mariana Islands** - Commonwealth of the Northern Mariana Islands (US overseas commonwealth)
- **List of cities in North Macedonia** - North Macedonia
- **List of cities in Norway** - Kingdom of Norway

== O ==
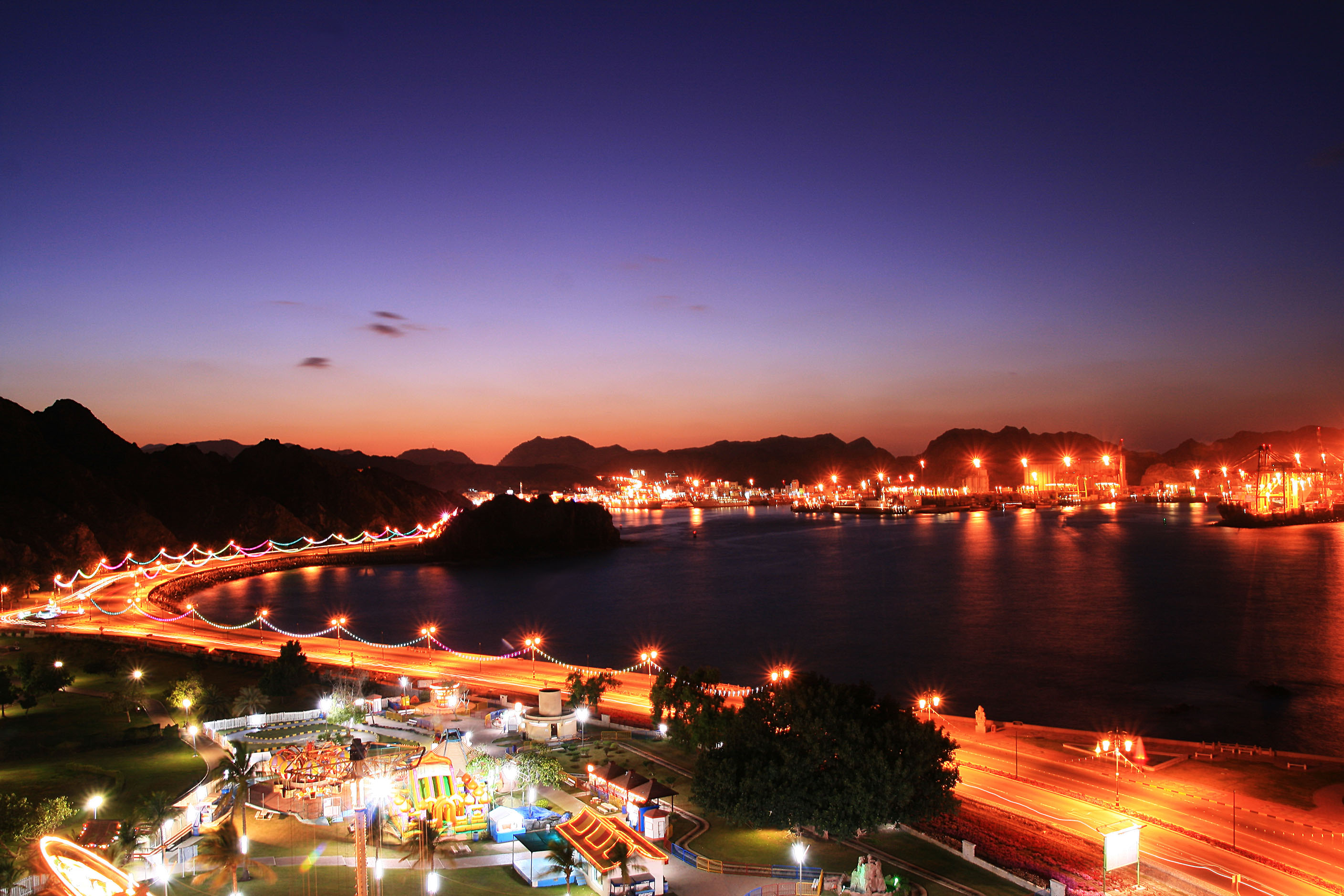
List of cities in Oman

- **List of cities in Oman** - Sultanate of Oman

== P ==
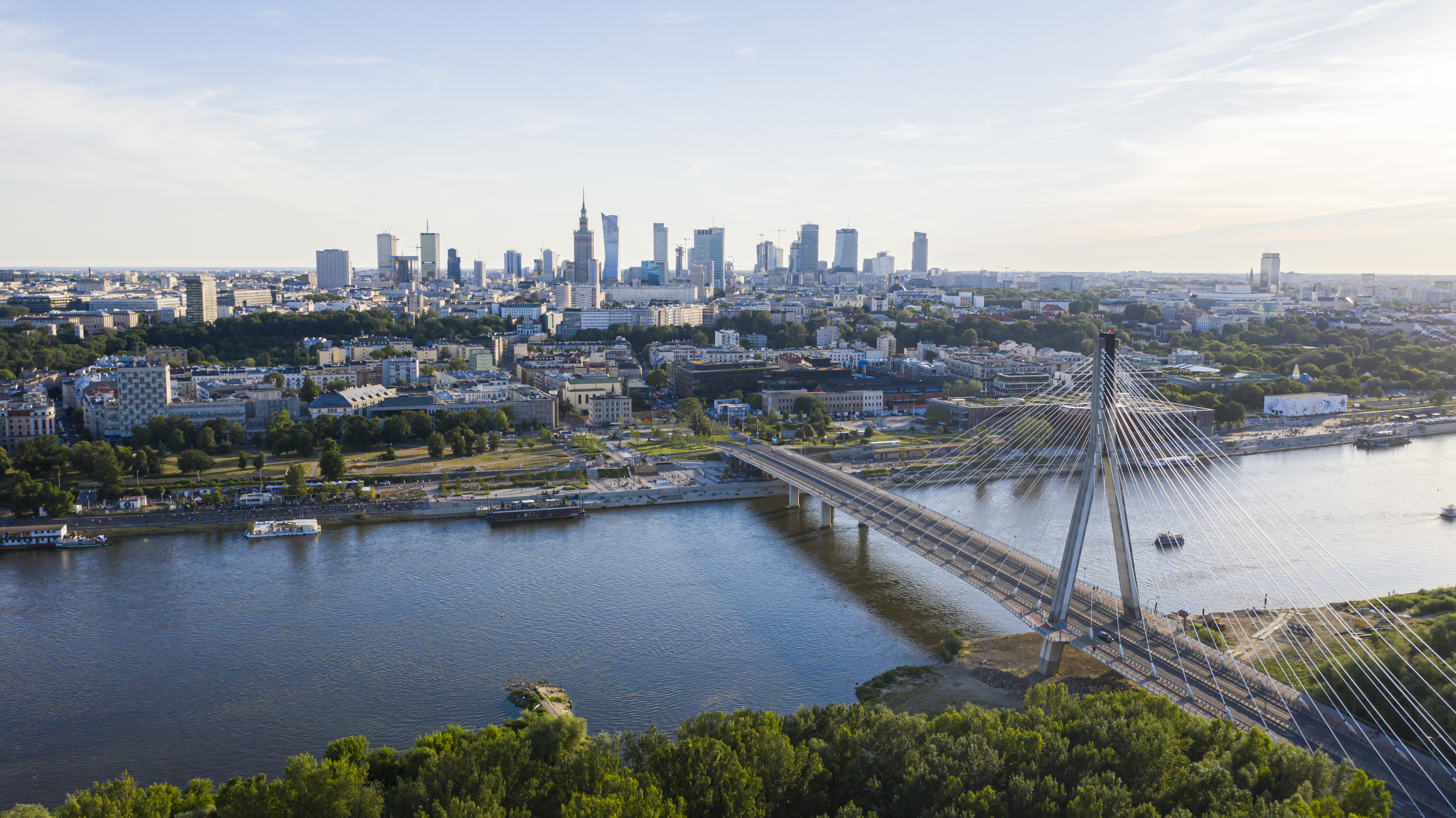
List of cities in Poland

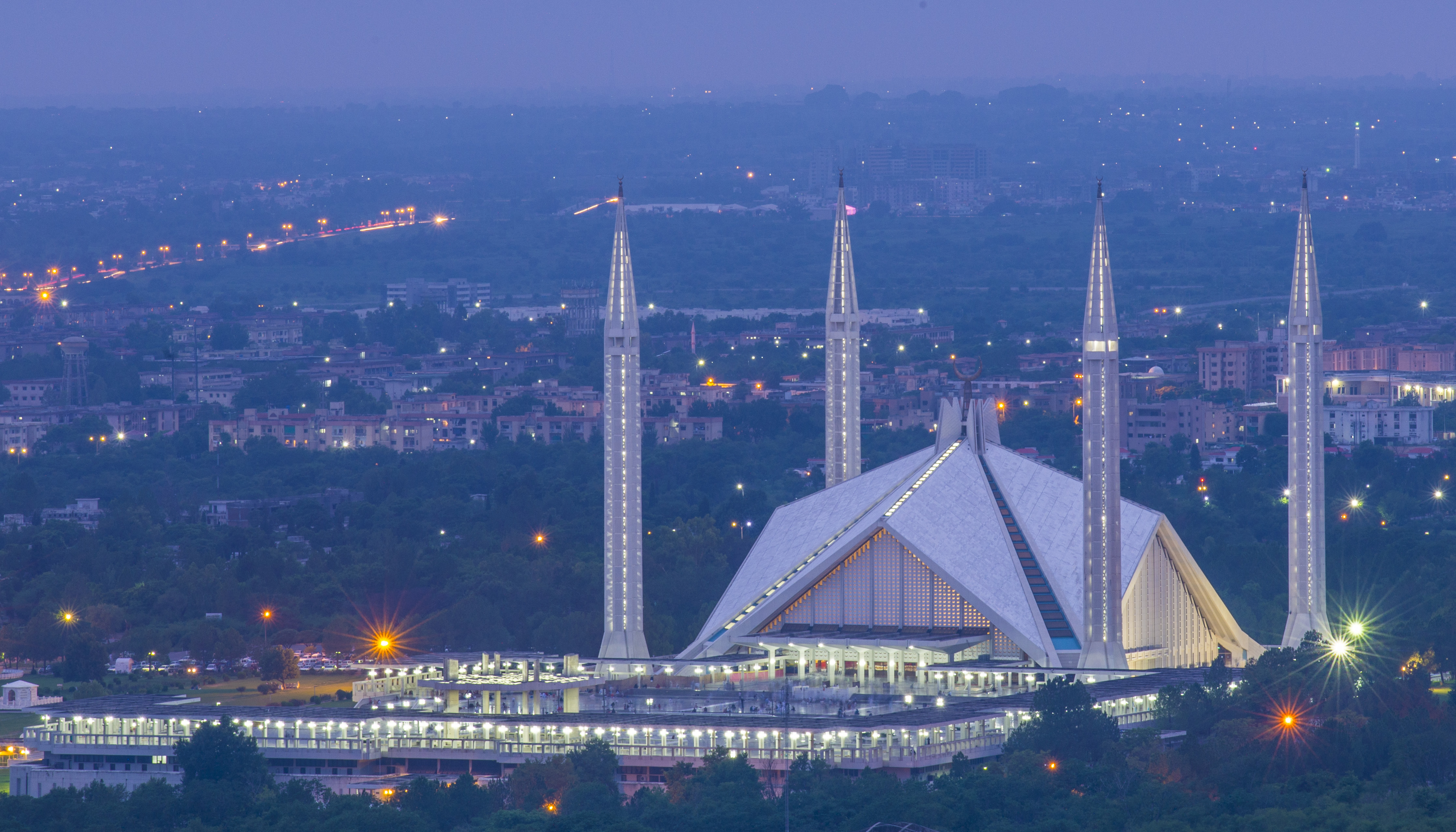
List of cities in Pakistan

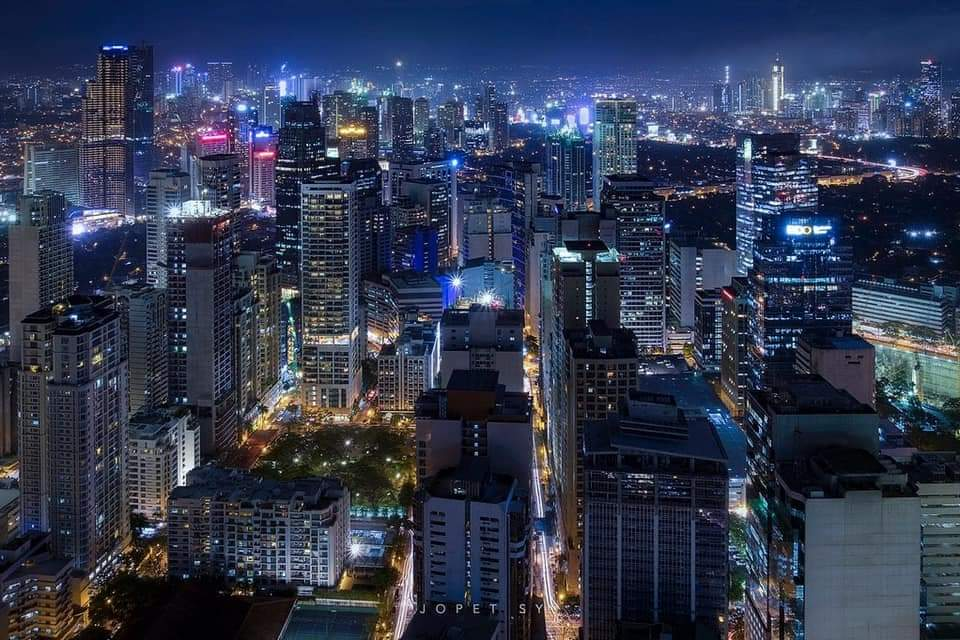
List of cities in the Philippines

- **List of cities in Pakistan** - Islamic Republic of Pakistan
- **List of cities in Palau** - Republic of Palau
- (Palestinian Authority) **List of cities in Palestine** - State of Palestine
- **List of cities in Panama** - Republic of Panama
- **List of cities in Papua New Guinea** - Independent State of Papua New Guinea
- **List of cities in Paraguay** - Republic of Paraguay
- **List of cities in Peru** - Republic of Peru
- **List of cities in the Philippines** - Republic of the Philippines
- **List of cities in the Pitcairn Islands** - Pitcairn, Henderson, Ducie, and Oeno Islands (UK overseas territory)
- **List of cities in Poland** - Republic of Poland
- **List of cities in Portugal** - Portuguese Republic
- **List of cities in Puerto Rico** - Commonwealth of Puerto Rico (US overseas commonwealth)

== Q ==
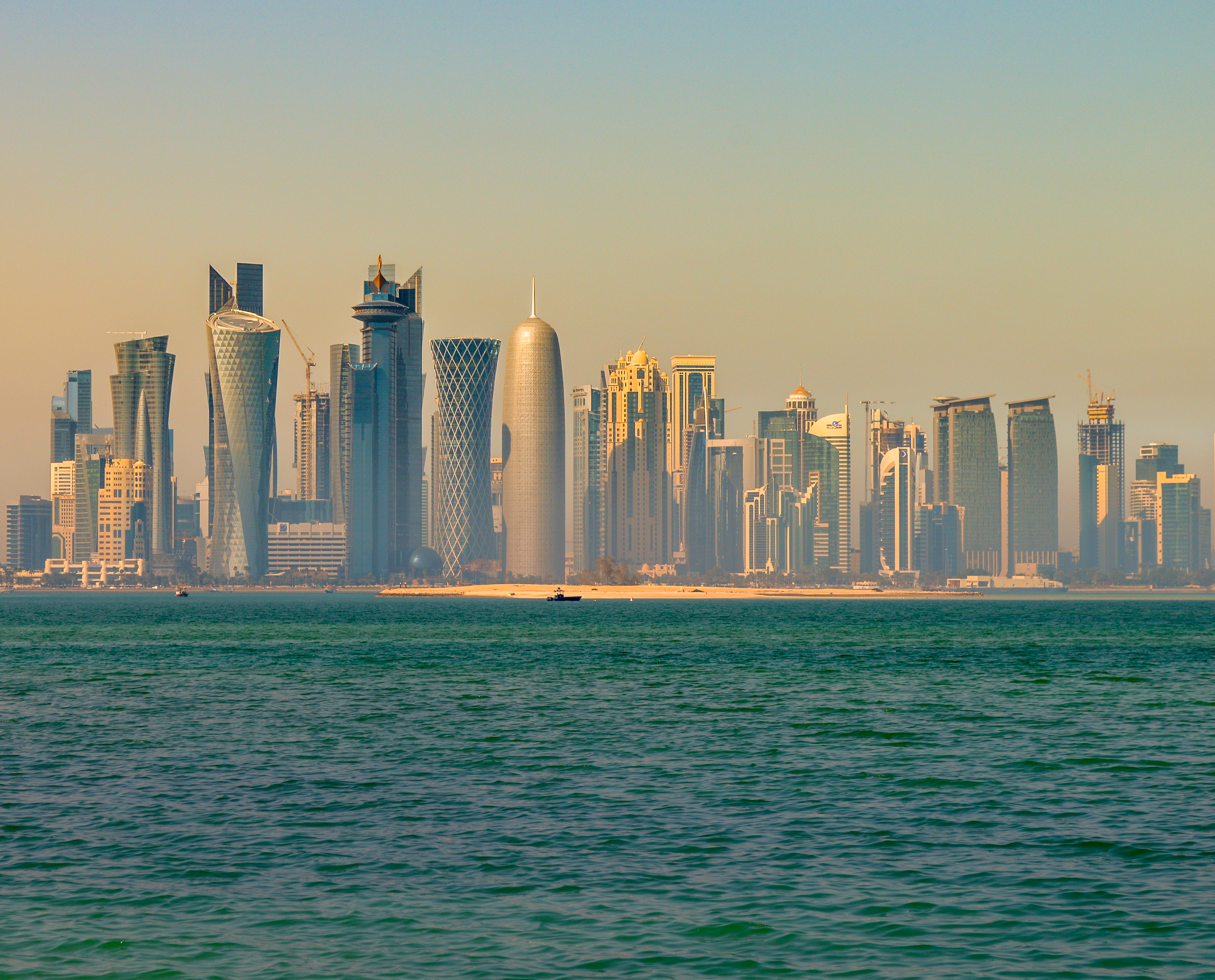
List of cities in Qatar

- **List of cities in Qatar** - State of Qatar

== R ==
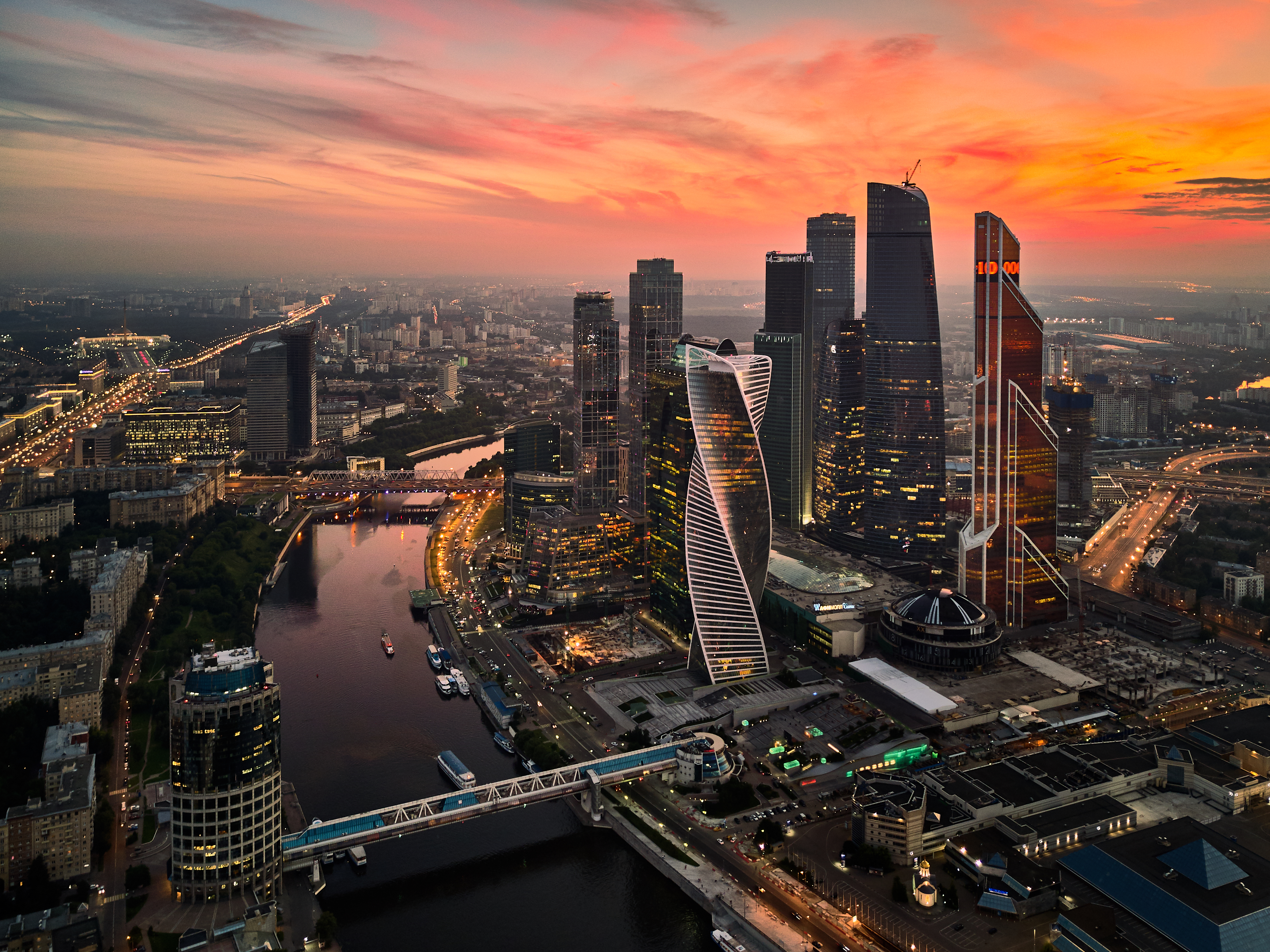
List of cities and towns in Russia

- **List of cities in Romania** - Romania
- **List of cities in Russia** - Russian Federation
- **List of cities in Rwanda** - Republic of Rwanda

== S ==
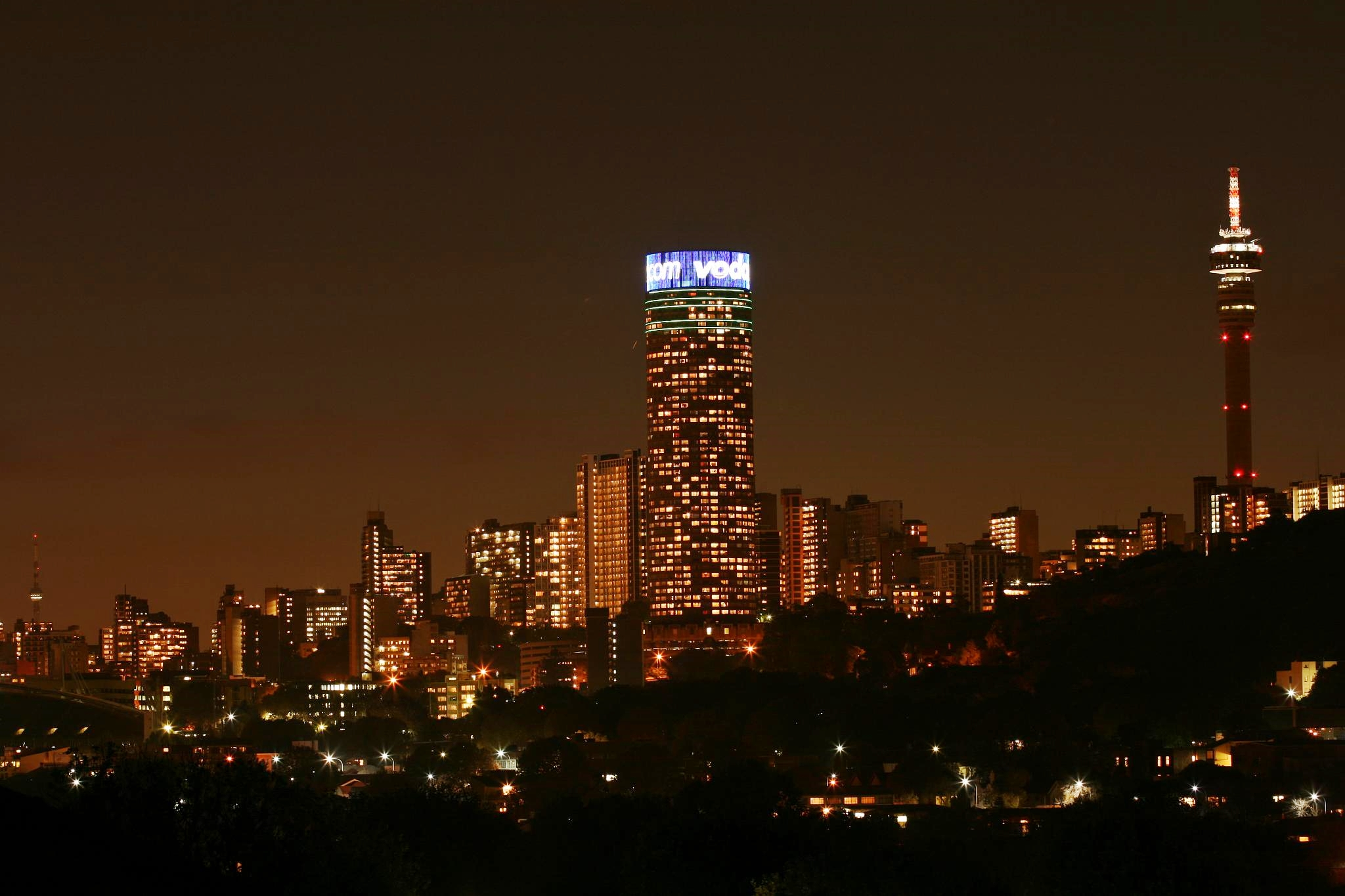
List of cities in South Africa

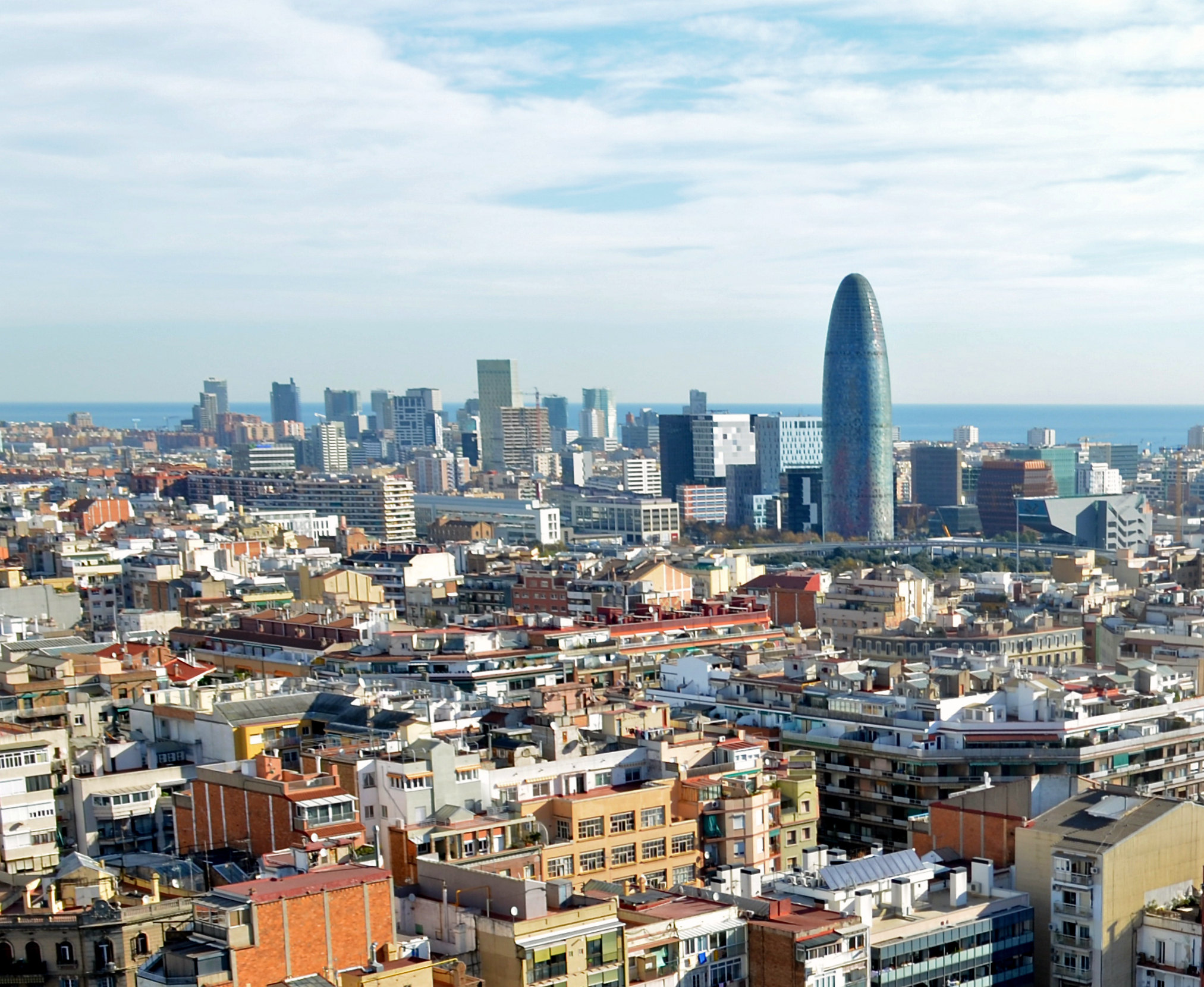
List of cities in Spain

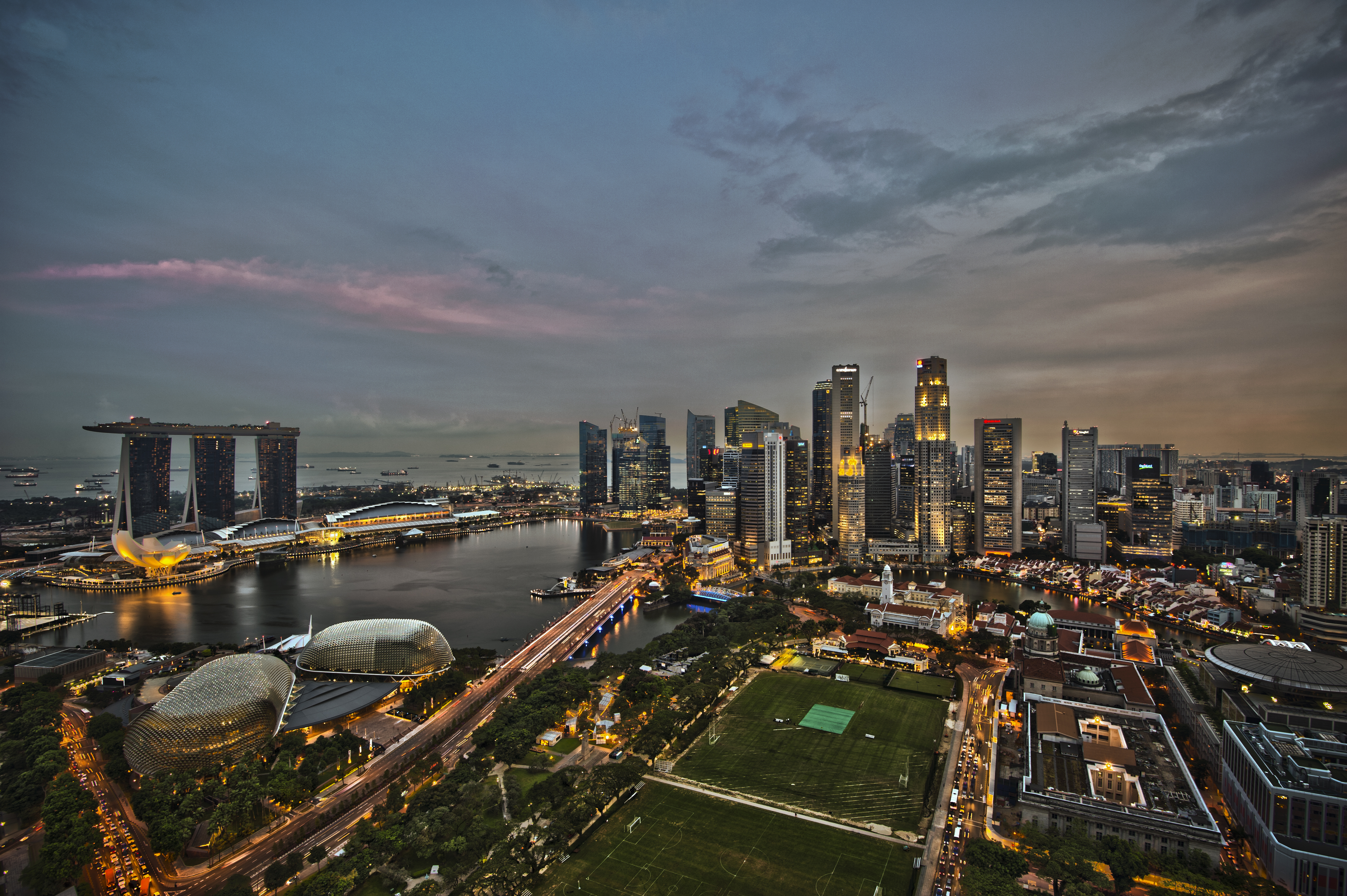
List of cities in Singapore

- **List of cities in Saint Kitts and Nevis** - Federation of Saint Christopher and Nevis
- **List of cities in Saint Lucia** - Saint Lucia
- **List of cities in Saint-Pierre and Miquelon** - Saint Pierre and Miquelon (French overseas community)
- **List of cities in Saint Vincent and the Grenadines** - Saint Vincent and the Grenadines
- **List of cities in Samoa** - Independent State of Samoa
- **List of cities in San Marino** - Most Serene Republic of San Marino
- **List of cities in São Tomé and Príncipe** - Democratic Republic of São Tomé and Príncipe
- **List of cities in Saudi Arabia** - Kingdom of Saudi Arabia
- **List of cities in Senegal** - Republic of Senegal
- **List of cities in Serbia** - Republic of Serbia
- **List of cities in Seychelles** - Republic of Seychelles
- **List of cities in Sierra Leone** - Republic of Sierra Leone
- **List of cities in Singapore** - Republic of Singapore
- **List of cities in Slovakia** - Slovak Republic
- **List of cities in Slovenia** - Republic of Slovenia
- **List of cities in the Solomon Islands** - Solomon Islands
- **List of cities in Somalia** - Federal Republic of Somalia
- **List of cities in Somaliland** - Republic of Somaliland
- **List of cities in South Africa** - Republic of South Africa
- **List of cities in South Ossetia** - Republic of South Ossetia
- **List of cities in South Sudan** - Republic of South Sudan
- **List of cities in Spain** - Kingdom of Spain
- **List of cities in Sri Lanka** - Democratic Socialist Republic of Sri Lanka
- **List of cities in Sudan** - Republic of the Sudan
- **List of cities in Suriname** - Republic of Suriname
- **List of cities in Svalbard** - Svalbard (Territory of Norway)
- **List of cities in Sweden** - Kingdom of Sweden
- **List of cities in Switzerland** - Swiss Confederation
- **List of cities in Syria** - Syrian Arab Republic

== T ==
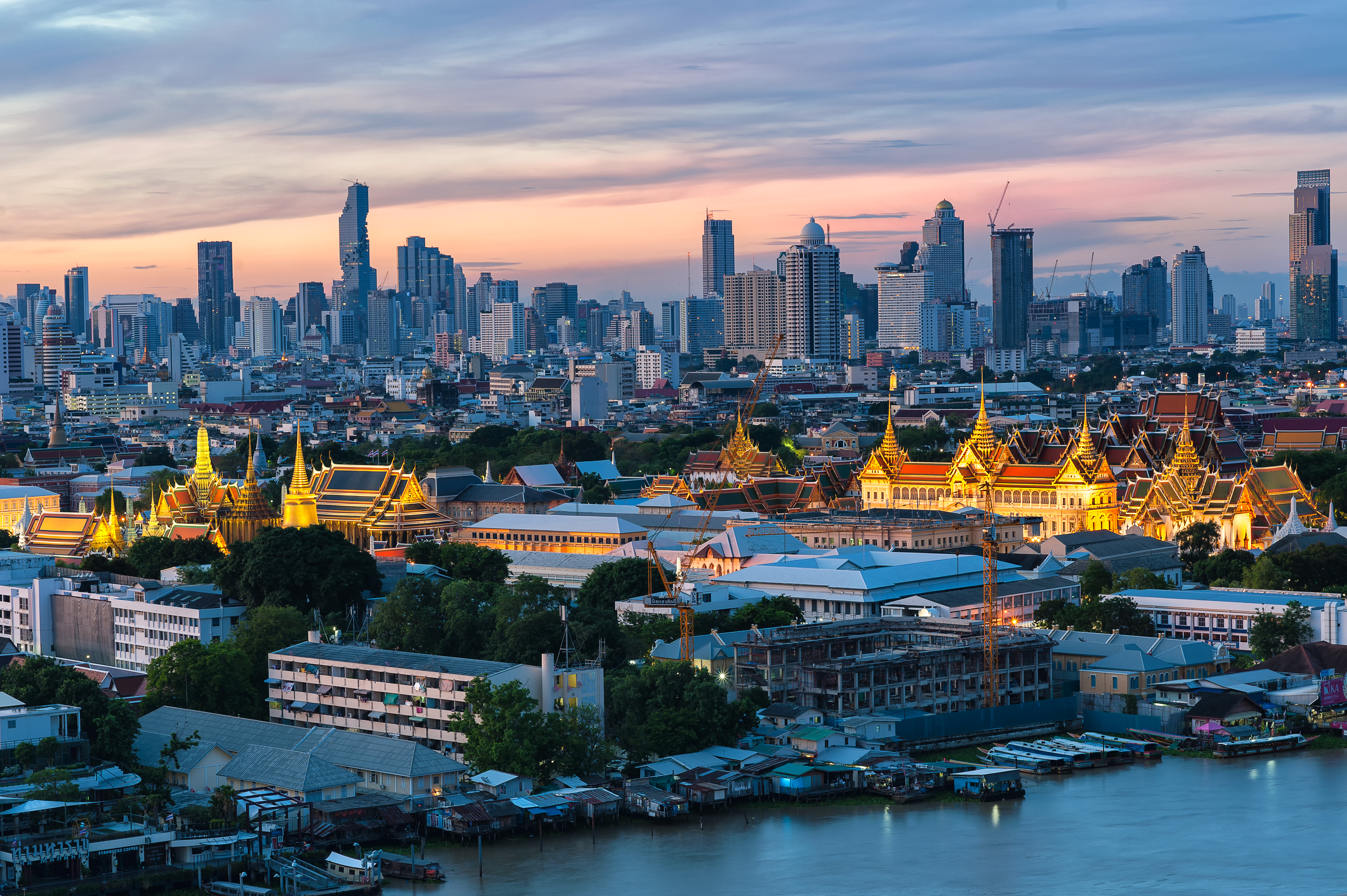
List of cities in Thailand

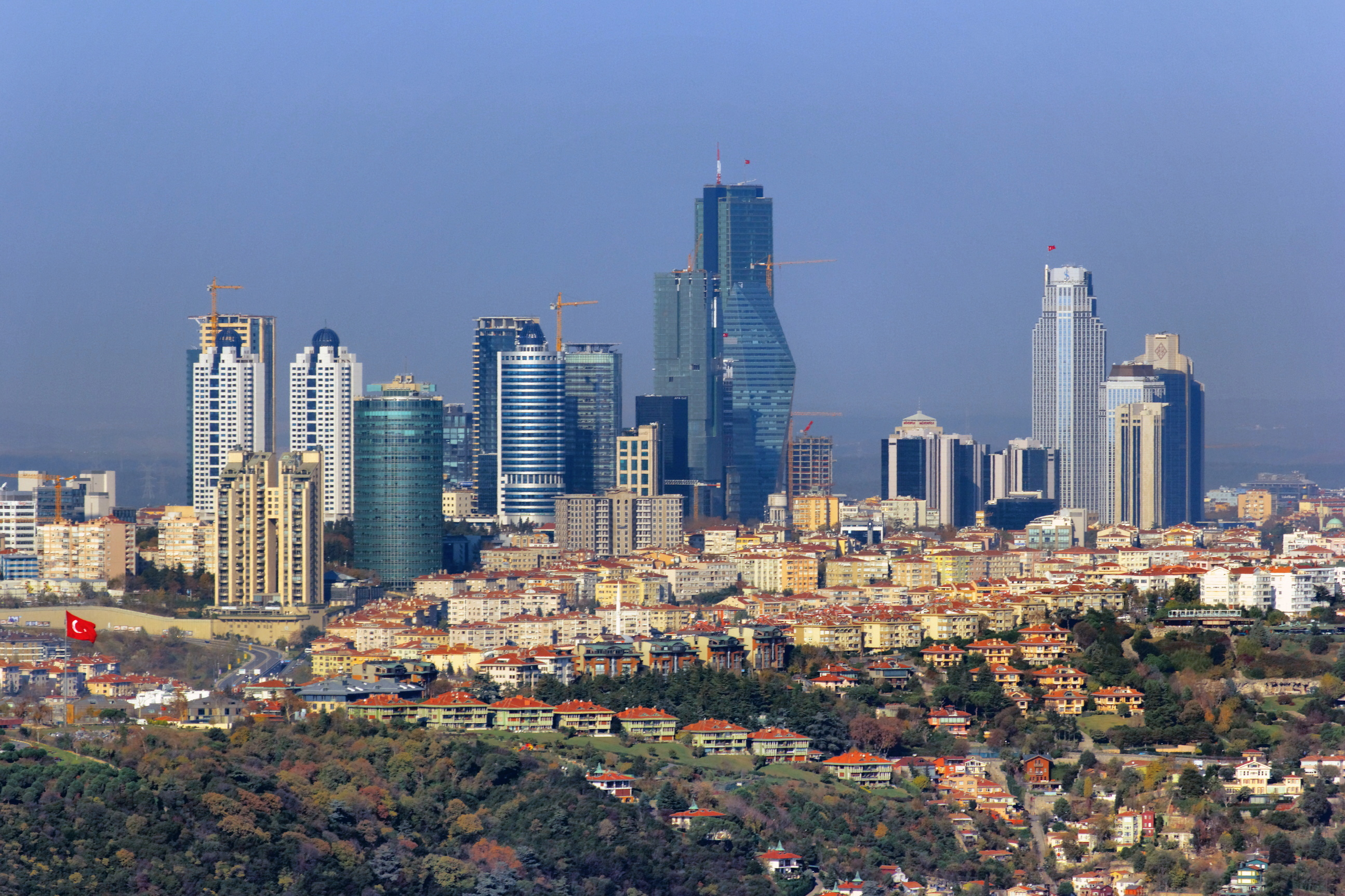
List of cities in Turkey

- **List of cities in Taiwan** - Republic of China
- **List of cities in Tajikistan** - Republic of Tajikistan
- **List of cities in Tanzania** - United Republic of Tanzania
- **List of cities in Thailand** - Kingdom of Thailand
- **List of cities in Togo** - Togolese Republic
- **List of villages in Tokelau** - Tokelau (Territory of New Zealand)
- **List of cities in Tonga** - Kingdom of Tonga
- **List of cities in Transnistria** - Pridnestrovian Moldavian Republic
- **List of cities in Trinidad and Tobago** - Republic of Trinidad and Tobago
- **List of cities in Tunisia** - Tunisian Republic
- **List of cities in Turkey** - Republic of Turkey
- **List of cities in Turkmenistan** - Turkmenistan
- **List of cities in the Turks and Caicos Islands** - Turks and Caicos Islands (UK overseas territory)
- **List of cities in Tuvalu** - Tuvalu

== U ==
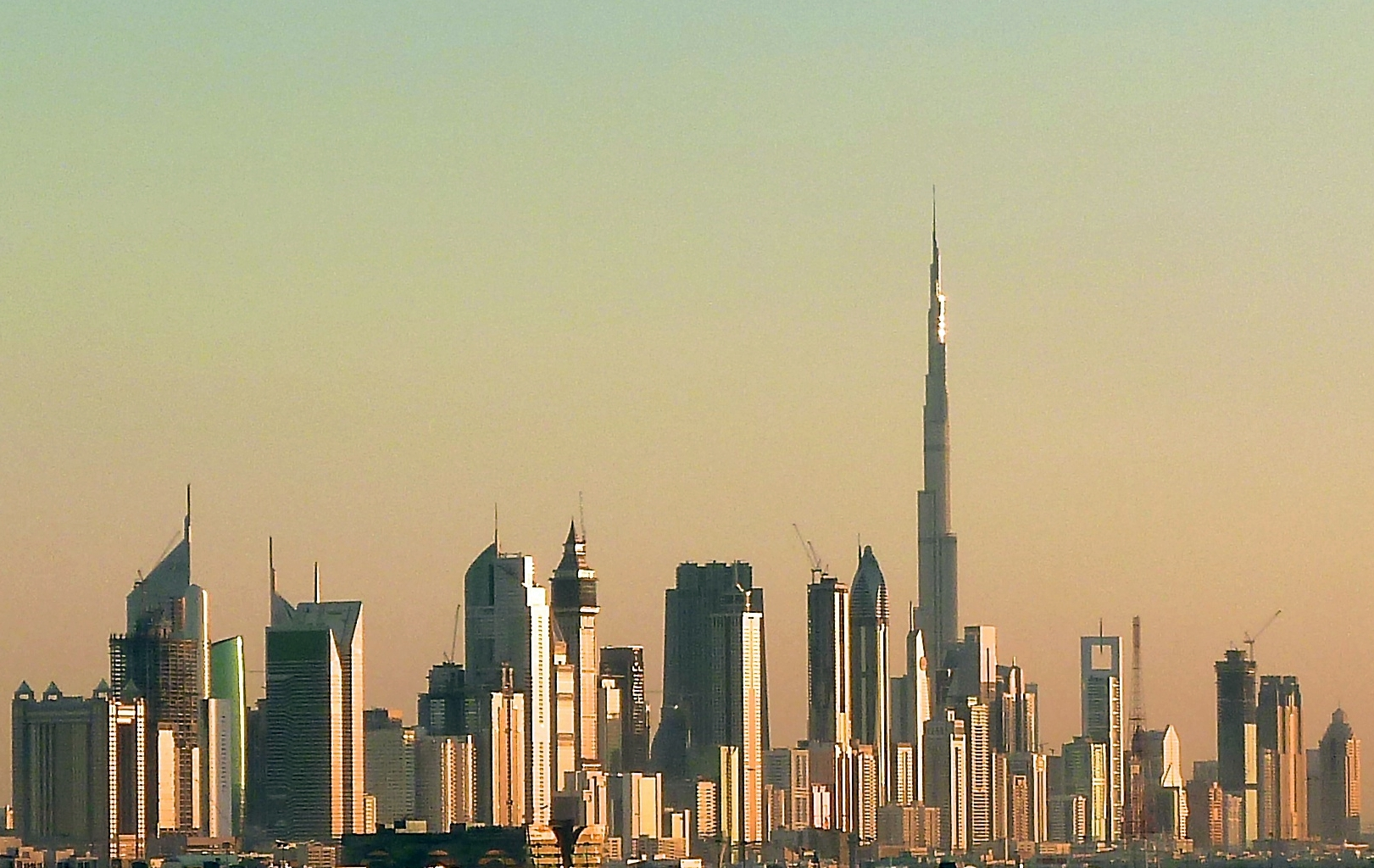
List of cities in the United Arab Emirates

List of cities in the United States

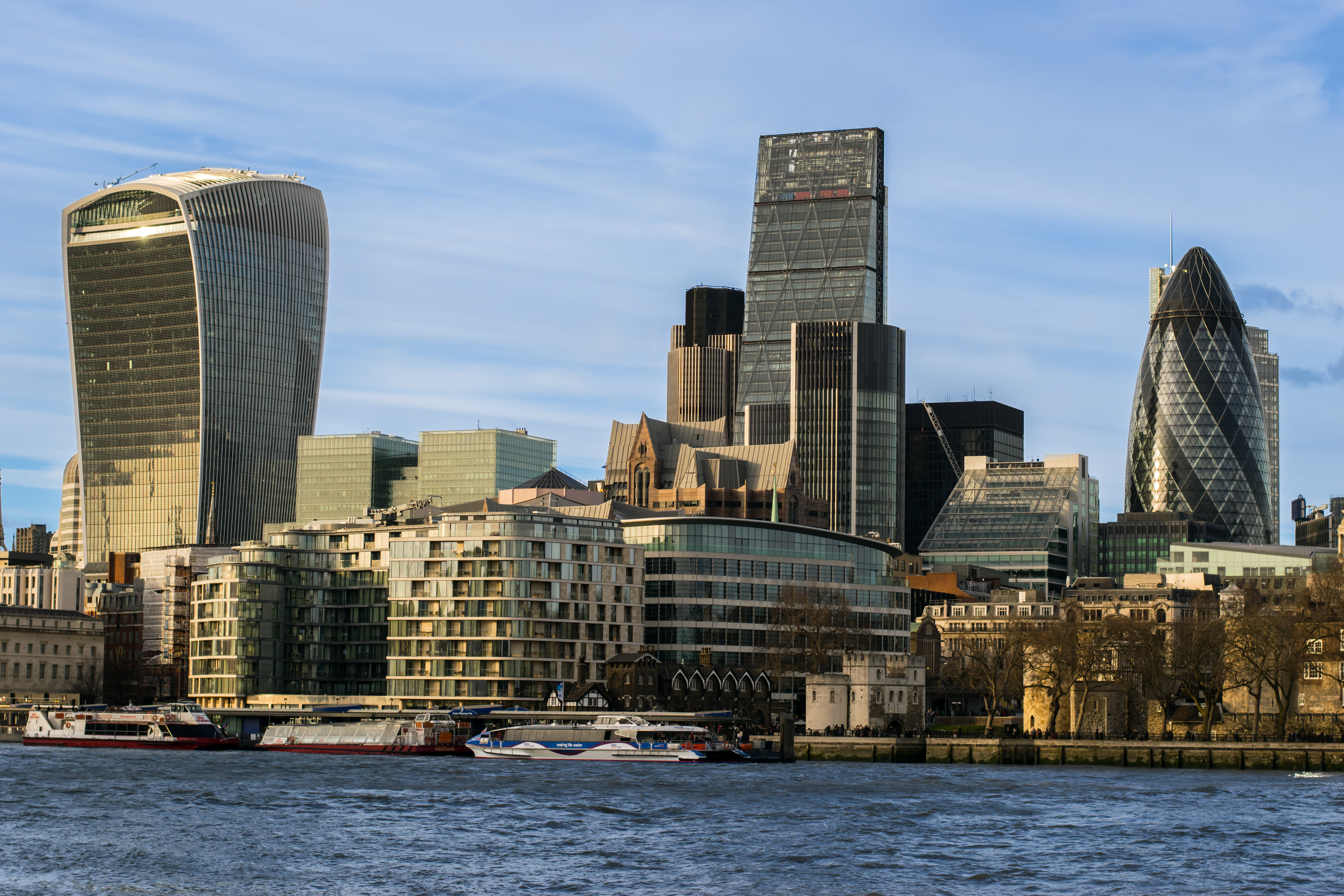
List of cities in the United Kingdom

- **List of cities in Uganda** - Republic of Uganda
- **List of cities in Ukraine** - Ukraine
- **List of cities in the United Arab Emirates** - United Arab Emirates
- **List of cities in the United Kingdom** - United Kingdom of Great Britain and Northern Ireland
- **List of cities in the United States** - United States of America
- **List of cities in Uruguay** - Oriental Republic of Uruguay
- **List of cities in Uzbekistan** - Republic of Uzbekistan

== V ==
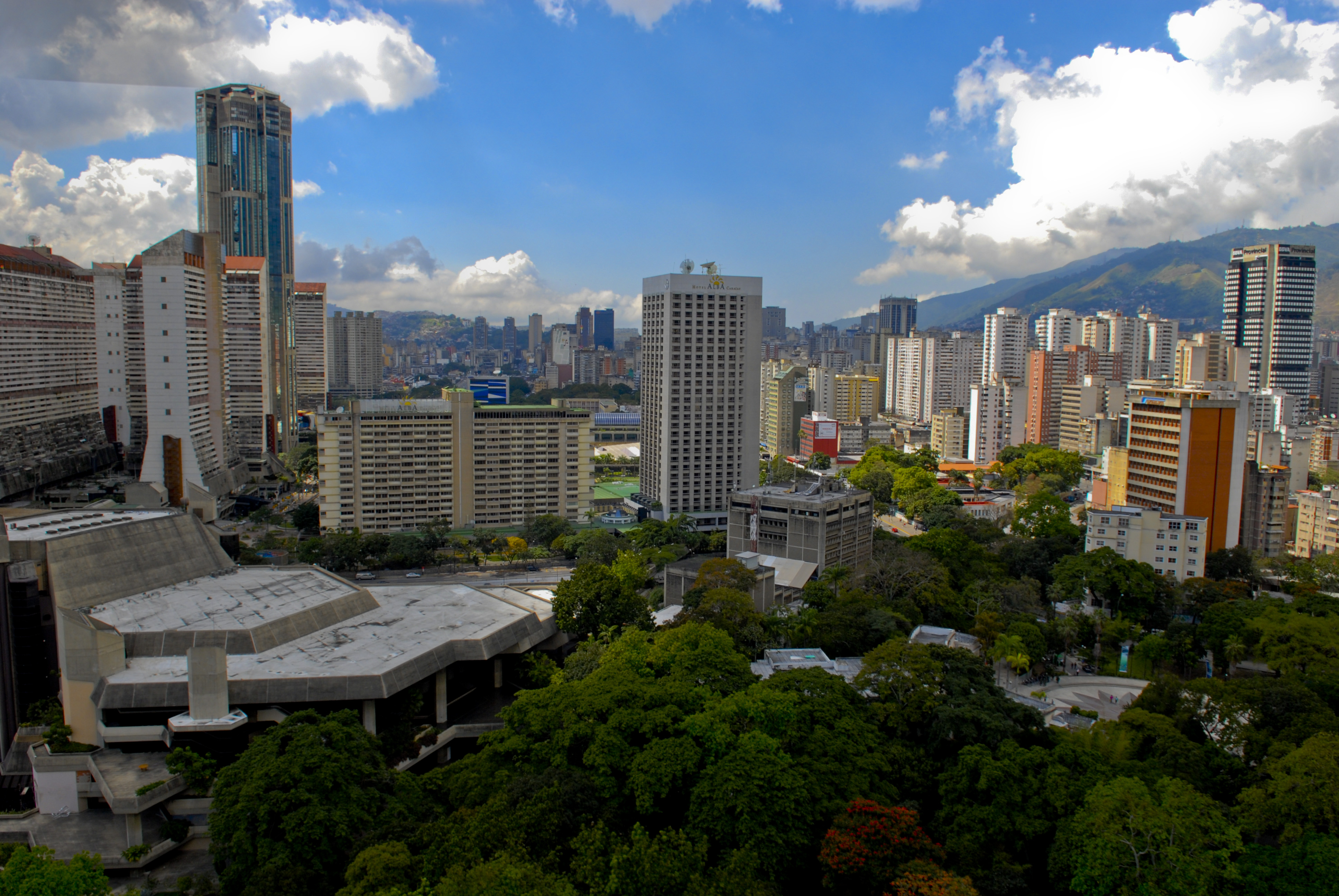
List of cities in Venezuela

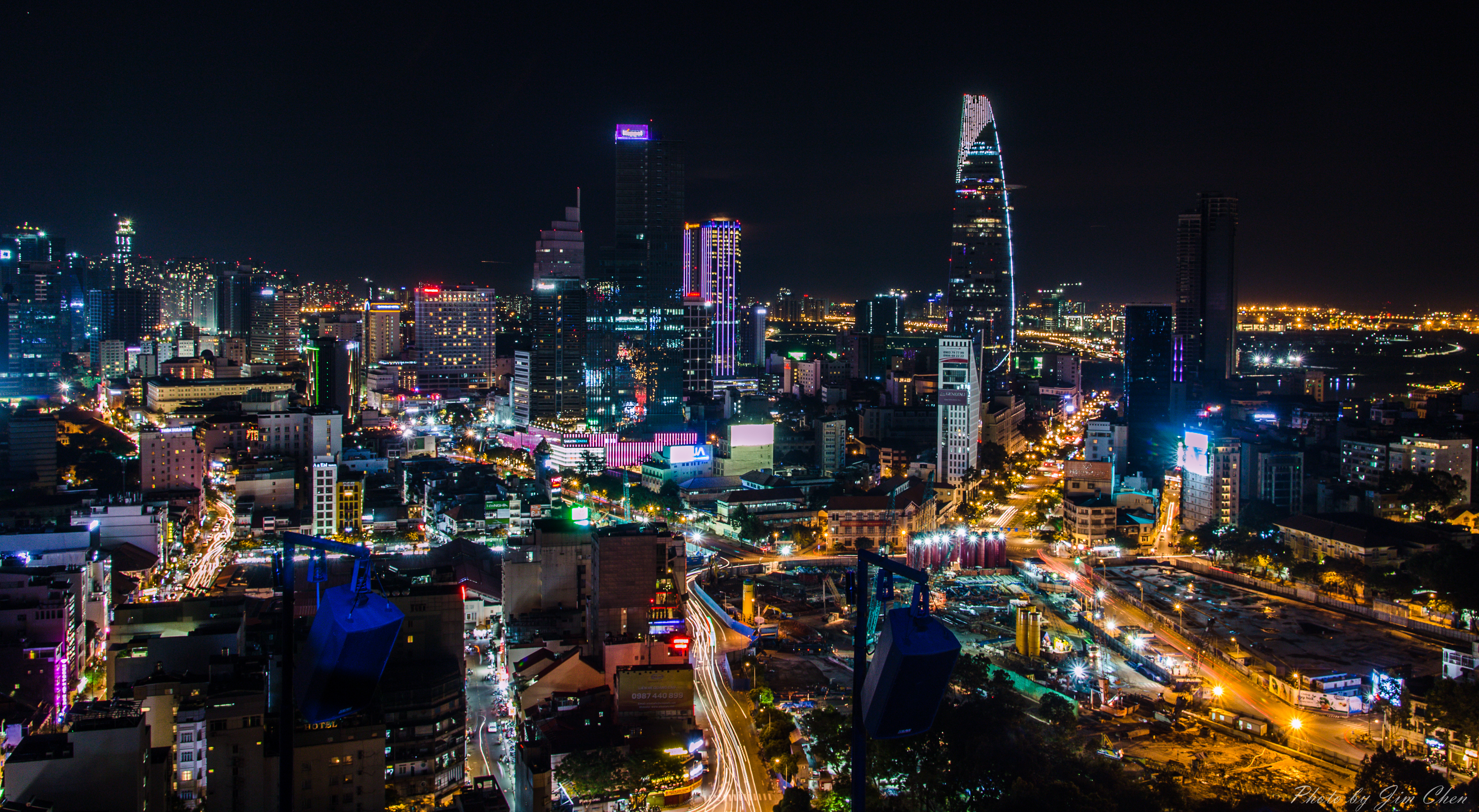
List of cities in Vietnam

- **List of cities in Vanuatu** - Republic of Vanuatu
- **Vatican City**
- **List of cities in Venezuela** - Bolivarian Republic of Venezuela
- **List of cities in Vietnam** - Socialist Republic of Vietnam
- **List of cities in the Virgin Islands** - United States Virgin Islands (US overseas territory)

== W ==
- See List of cities in Palestinian Authority areas for West Bank
- **List of cities in Western Sahara** - Western Sahara

== Y ==
- **List of cities in Yemen** - Republic of Yemen

== Z ==
- **List of cities in Zambia** - Republic of Zambia
- **List of cities in Zimbabwe** - Republic of Zimbabwe

== See also ==
- Lists by country
- Lists of cities
- List of cities in Europe by country
- List of former sovereign states
- Former countries in Europe after 1815
- List of countries
