= List of cities in East Asia =

This is a list of major cities in East Asia.

Country	Main article
China	List of cities in China
Taiwan	List of cities in Taiwan
Japan	List of cities in Japan
Mongolia	List of cities in Mongolia
North Korea	List of cities in North Korea
South Korea	List of cities in South Korea

== China ==
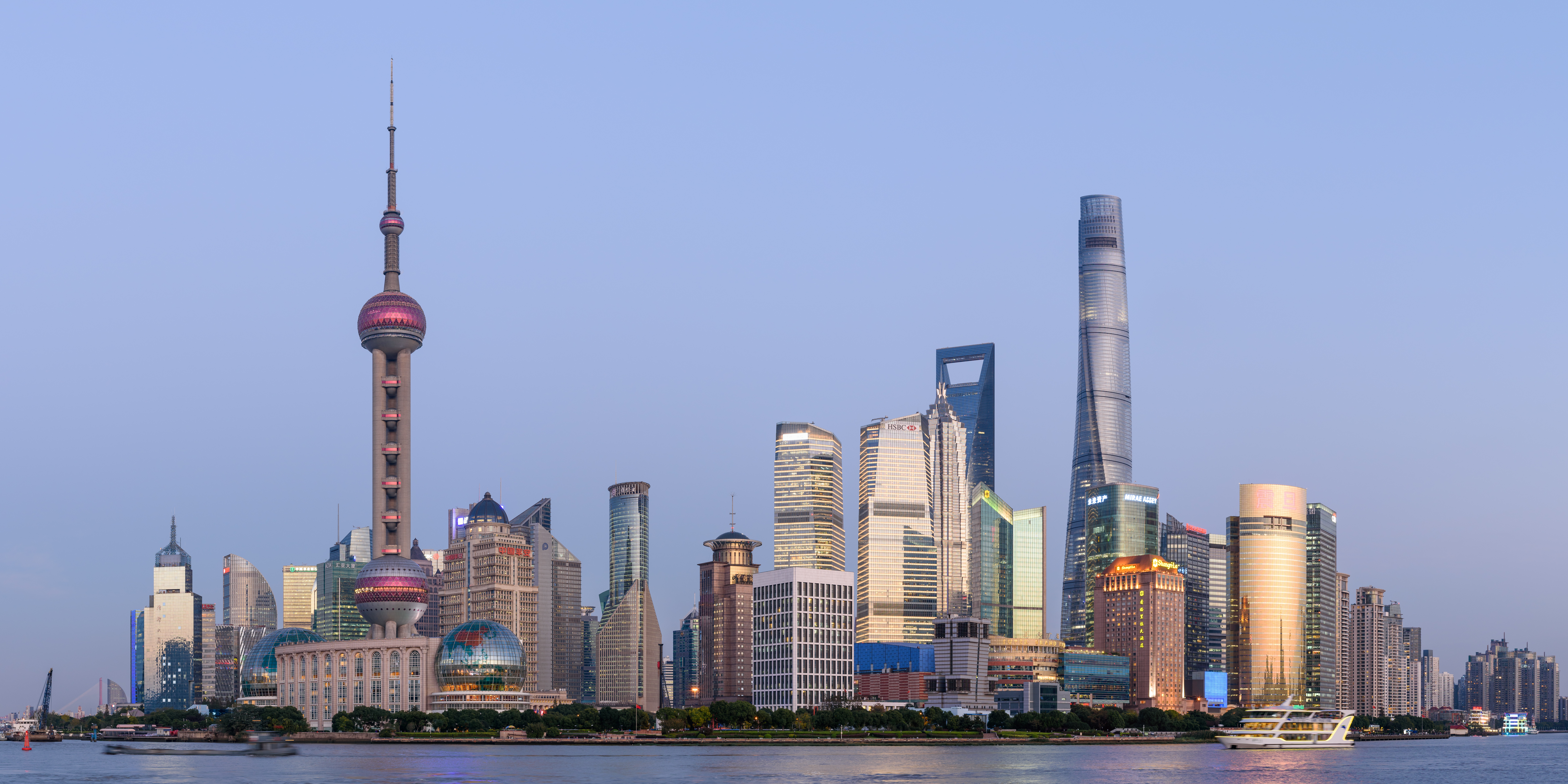
Shanghai

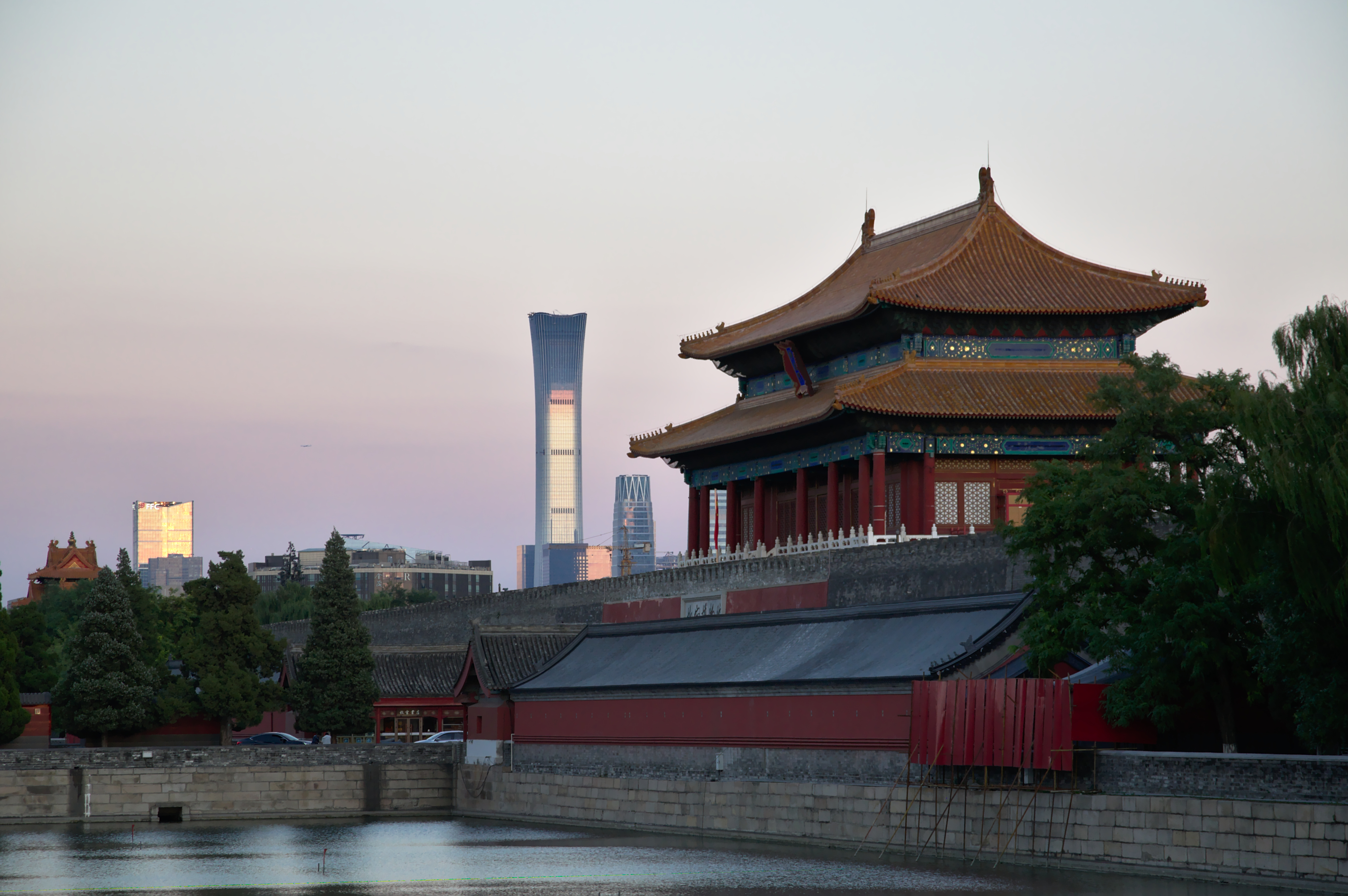
Beijing

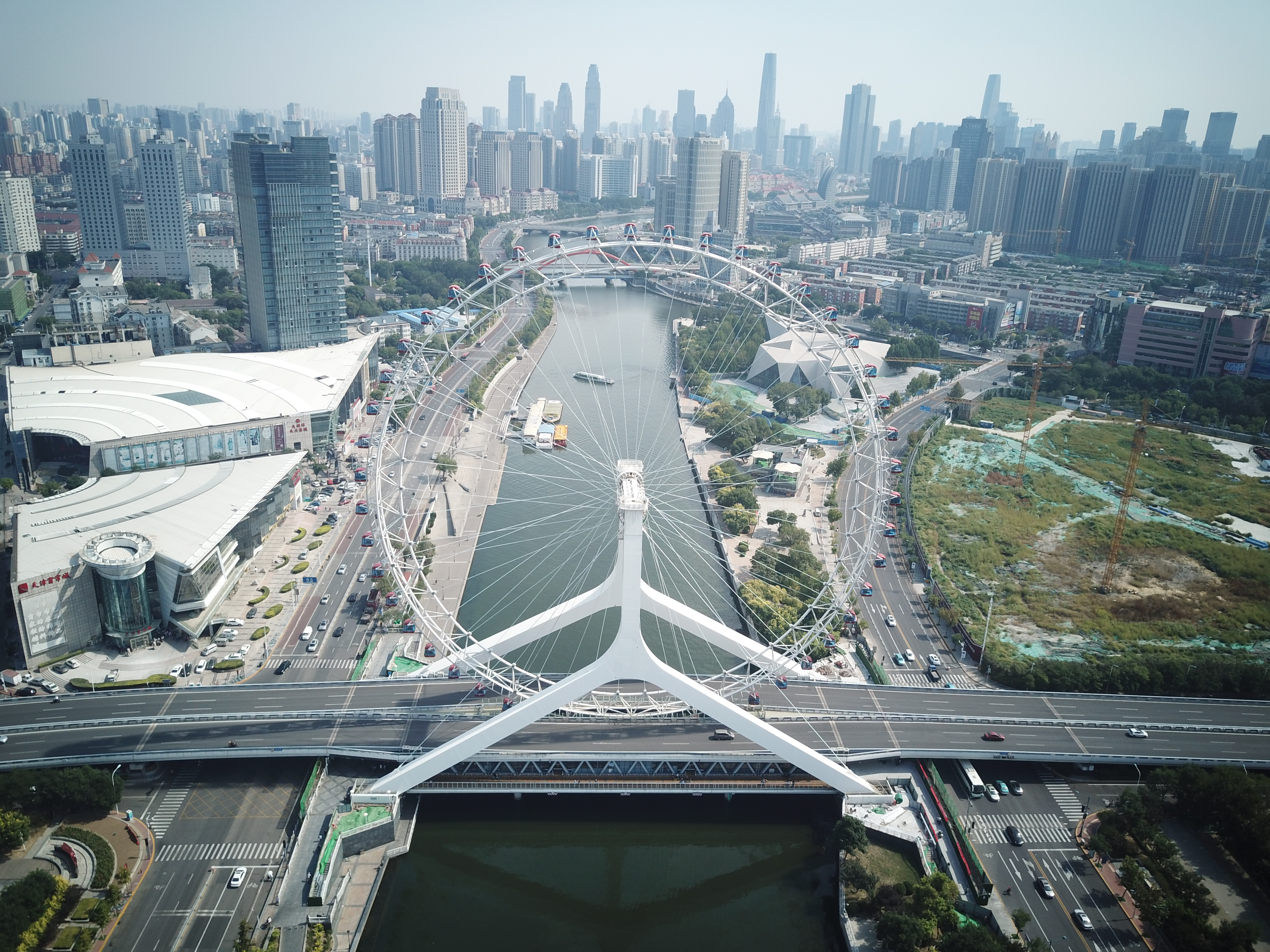
Tianjin

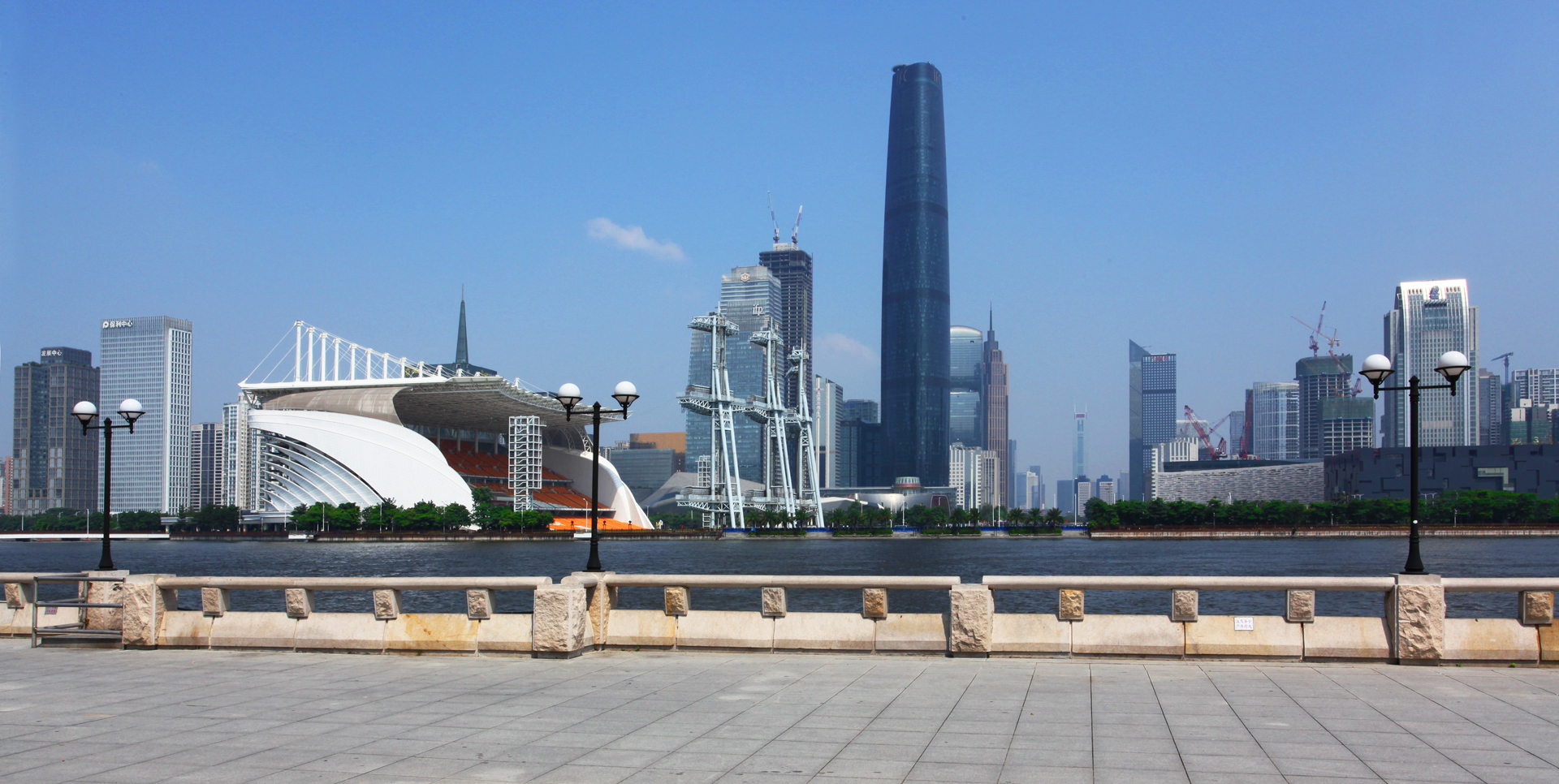
Guangzhou

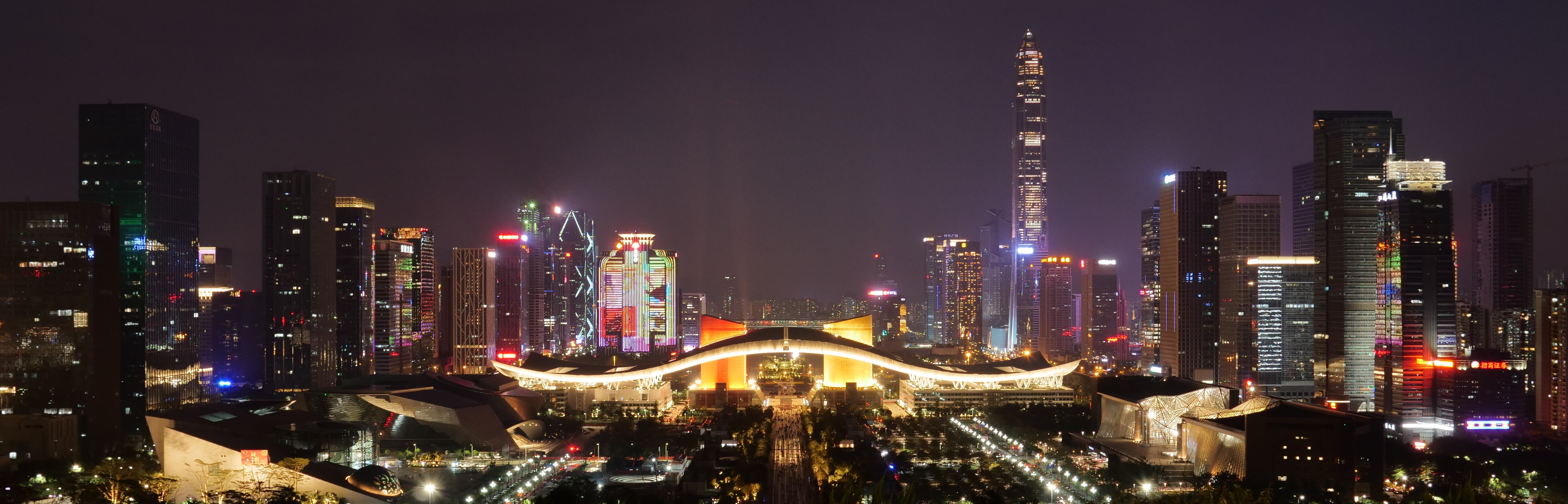
Shenzhen

City	Chinese	Pinyin	Province	Population (2010)	
City	Chinese	Pinyin	Province	Urban Population (2010)	Administrative Population (2010)
Shanghai	上海	Shànghǎi	Municipality	22,315,426	23,019,148
Beijing	北京	Běijīng	Municipality	18,827,000	19,612,368
Tianjin	天津	Tiānjīn	Municipality	11,090,314	12,937,954
Guangzhou	广州	Guǎngzhōu	Guangdong	11,070,654	12,700,800
Shenzhen	深圳	Shēnzhèn	Guangdong	10,357,938	10,357,938
Dongguan	东莞	Dōngguǎn	Guangdong	8,220,937	8,220,937
Chengdu	成都	Chéngdū	Sichuan	7,123,697	14,047,625
Nanjing	南京	Nánjīng	Jiangsu	6,852,984	8,004,680
Wuhan	武汉	Wǔhàn	Hubei	6,434,373	9,785,392
Shenyang	沈阳	Shěnyáng	Liaoning	5,743,718	8,106,171
Hangzhou	杭州	Hángzhōu	Zhejiang	5,695,313	8,700,400
Chongqing	重庆	Chóngqìng	Municipality	5,402,721	28,846,170
Suzhou	苏州	Sūzhōu	Jiangsu	5,349,000	10,465,994
Harbin	哈尔滨	Hārbīn	Heilongjiang	5,282,083	10,635,971
Jinan	济南	Jǐnán	Shandong	3,922,180	6,814,000
Xi'an	西安	Xī'ān	Shaanxi	3,890,098	8,467,837
Wuxi	无锡	Wúxí	Jiangsu	3,542,319	6,372,624
Hefei	合肥	Héféi	Anhui	3,352,076	5,702,466
Changchun	长春	Chángchūn	Jilin	3,341,700	7,677,089
Changzhou	常州	Chángzhōu	Jiangsu	3,290,548	4,591,972
Dalian	大连	Dàlián	Liaoning	3,266,905	6,690,432
Taiyuan	太原	Tàiyuán	Shanxi	3,212,500	4,201,591
Kunming	昆明	Kūnmíng	Yunnan	3,184,580	6,432,212
Zhengzhou	郑州	Zhèngzhōu	Henan	3,132,000	8,626,505
Changsha	长沙	Chángshā	Hunan	3,093,980	7,044,118
Ningbo	宁波	Níngbō	Zhejiang	3,089,180	7,605,700
Qingdao	青岛	Qīngdǎo	Shandong	3,063,492	8,715,100
Zibo	淄博	Zībó	Shandong	3,002,181	4,530,600
Fuzhou	福州	Fúzhōu	Fujian	2,921,763	7,115,370
Nanning	南宁	Nánníng	Guangxi	2,875,220	6,661,600

== Taiwan ==
City	Image	Chinese	Pinyin	County	Population (2017)
New Taipei		新北	Xīnběi	Special municipality	3,979,208
Taichung		臺中	Táizhōng	Special municipality	2,778,182
Kaohsiung		高雄	Gāoxióng	Special municipality	2,777,873
Taipei		臺北	Táiběi	Special municipality	2,695,704
Taoyuan		桃園	Táoyuán	Special municipality	2,171,127
Tainan		臺南	Táinán	Special municipality	1,886,267
Hsinchu		新竹	Xīnzhú	Provincial city	439,435
Keelung		基隆	Jīlóng	Provincial city	371,853
Chiayi		嘉義	Jiāyì	Provincial city	269,608
Changhua		彰化	Zhānghuà	Changhua	234,053
Pingtung		屏東	Píngdōng	Pingtung	285,804

== Japan ==
City	image	Japanese	Prefecture	Population (2010)
Special wards of Tokyo		東京特別区	Tokyo	8,949,447
Yokohama		横浜	Kanagawa	3,689,603
Osaka		大阪	Osaka	2,666,371
Nagoya		名古屋	Aichi	2,263,907
Sapporo		札幌	Hokkaido	1,914,434
Kobe		神戸	Hyōgo	1,544,873
Kyoto		京都	Kyoto	1,474,473
Fukuoka		福岡	Fukuoka	1,463,826
Kawasaki		川崎	Kanagawa	1,425,678
Saitama		さいたま	Saitama	1,222,910
Hiroshima		広島	Hiroshima	1,174,209
Sendai		仙台	Miyagi	1,045,903
Kitakyushu		北九州	Fukuoka	977,288
Chiba		千葉	Chiba	962,130
Sakai		堺	Osaka	842,134
Niigata		新潟	Niigata	812,192
Hamamatsu		浜松	Shizuoka	800,912
Kumamoto		熊本	Kumamoto	734,294
Sagamihara		相模原	Kanagawa	717,561
Shizuoka		静岡	Shizuoka	716,328
Okayama		岡山	Okayama	709,622

== Mongolia ==
City	Image	Mongolian Cyrillic	Mongolian script	Province	Population (2008)
Ulaanbaatar		Улаанбаатар	ᠤᠯᠠᠭᠠᠨᠪᠠᠭᠠᠲᠤᠷ	Municipality	1,008,738
Erdenet		Эрдэнэт	ᠡᠷᠳᠡᠨᠢᠲᠦ	Orkhon	86,866
Darkhan		Дархан	ᠳᠠᠷᠬᠠᠨ	Darkhan-Uul	74,300
Choibalsan		Чойбалсан	ᠴᠣᠶᠢᠪᠠᠯᠰᠠᠩ	Dornod	38,150
Mörön		Мөрөн	ᠮᠥᠷᠡᠨ	Khövsgöl	36,082

== North Korea ==
City	Image	Chosŏn'gŭl	Hancha	Province	Population (2008)
Pyongyang		평양	平壤	Direct-administered city	3,255,288
Hamhung		함흥	咸興	South Hamgyong	768,551
Chongjin		청진	清津	North Hamgyong	667,929
Nampo		남포	南浦	Special city	366,341
Wonsan		원산	元山	Kangwon	363,127
Sinuiju		신의주	新義州	North Pyongan	359,341
Tanchon	N/A	단천	端川	South Hamgyong	345,876
Kaechon	N/A	개천	价川	South Pyongan	319,554
Kaesong		개성	開城	Special-level city	308,440
Sariwon		사리원	沙里院	North Hwanghae	307,764

== South Korea ==
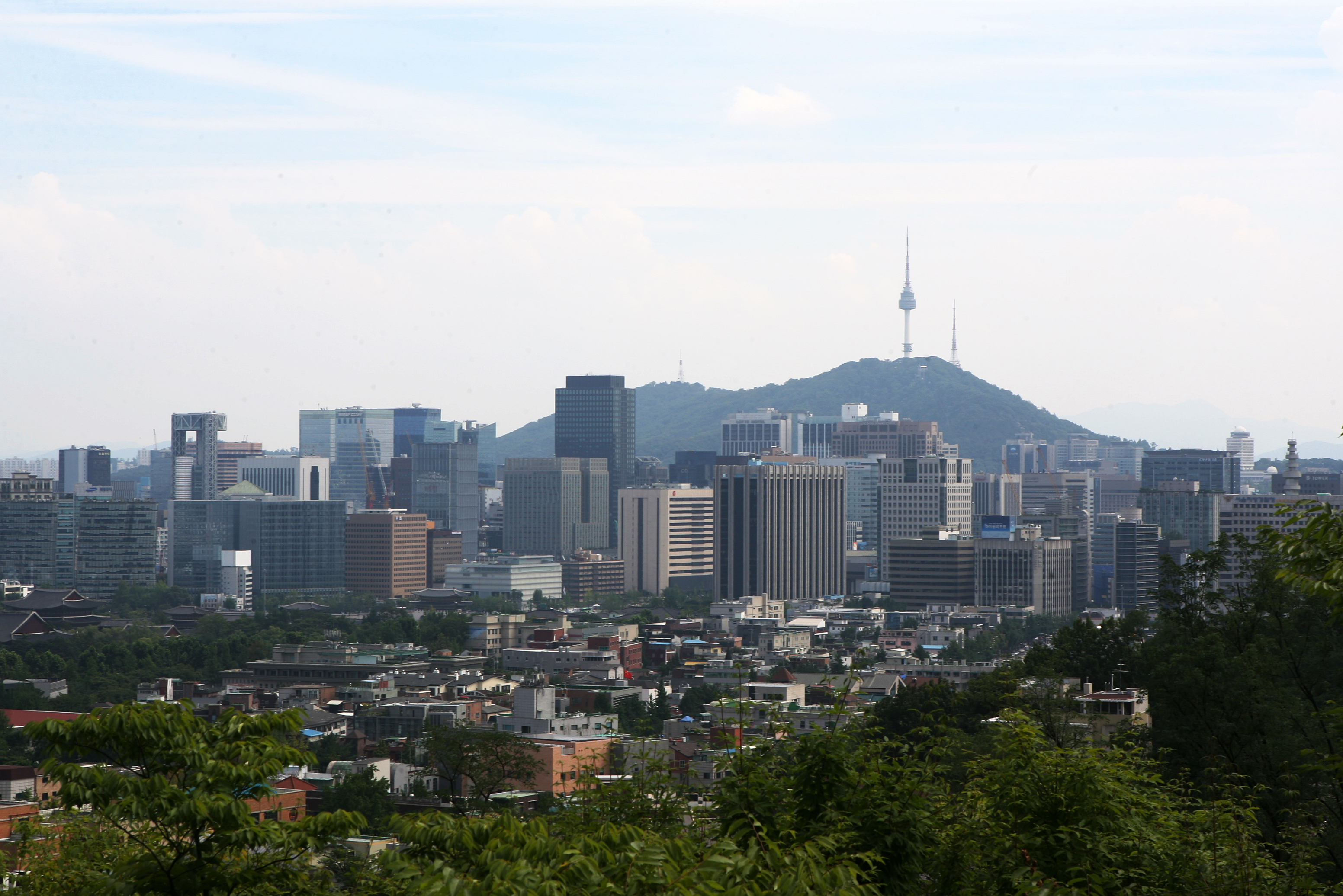
Seoul

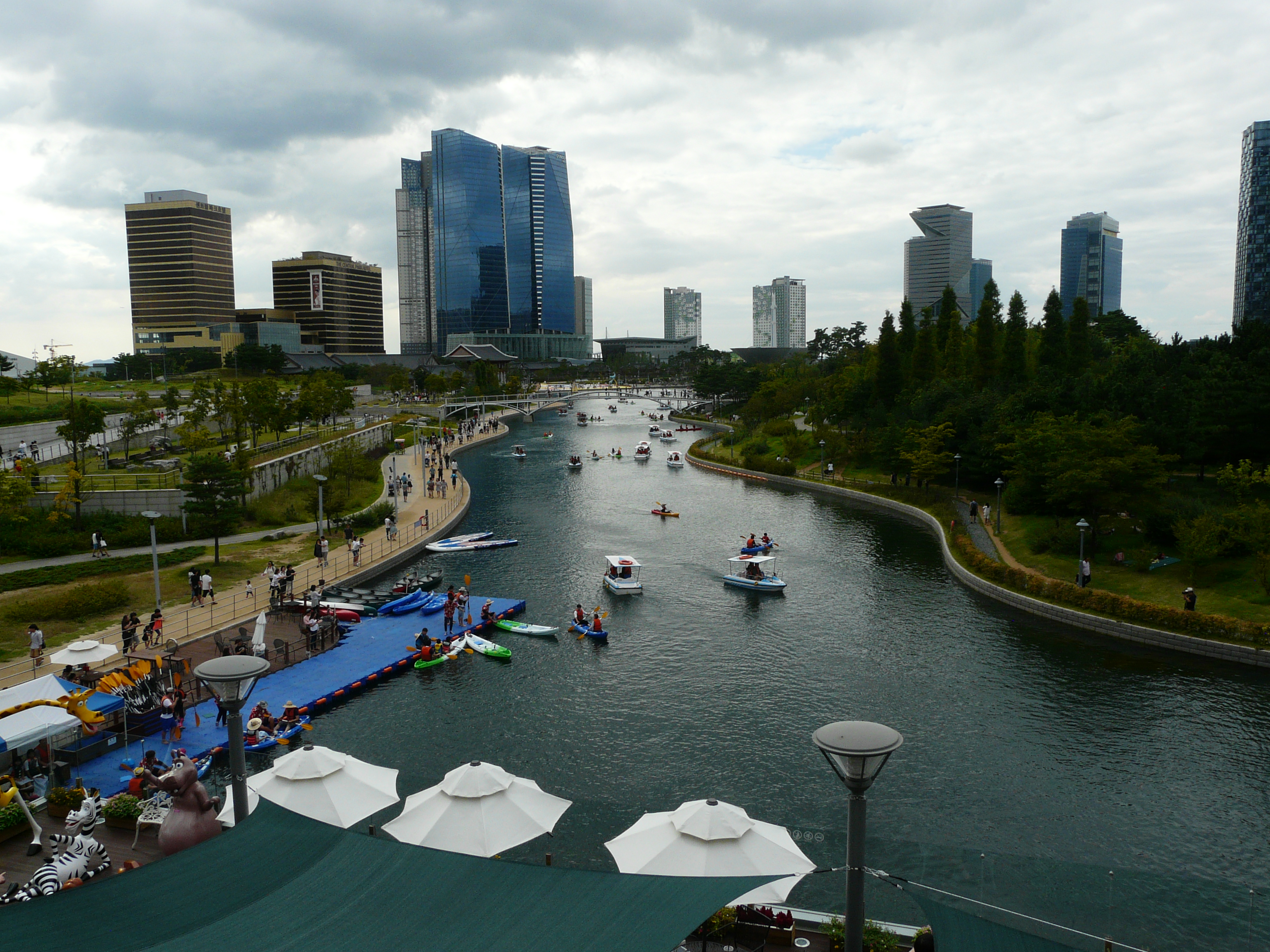
Incheon

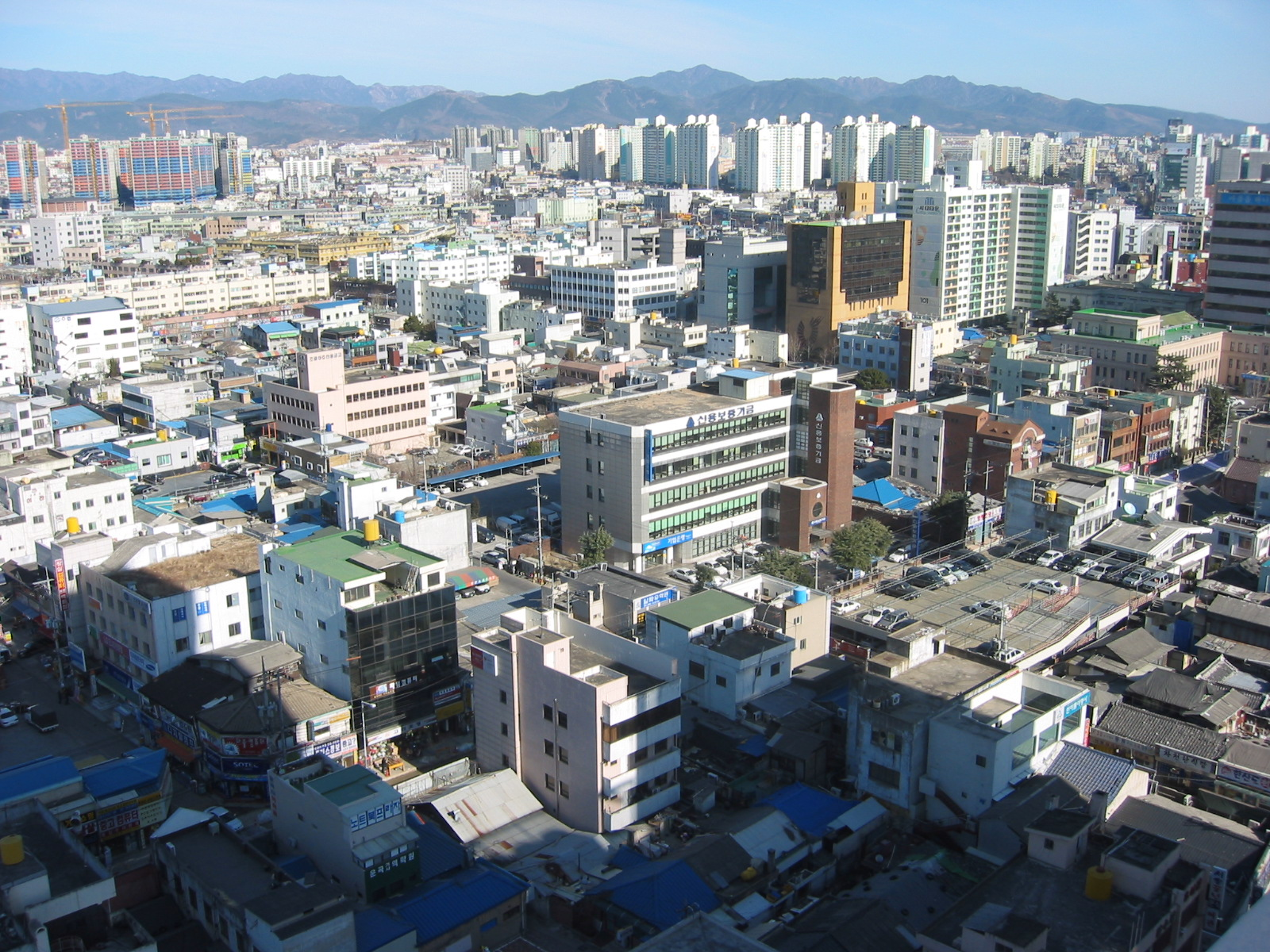
Daegu

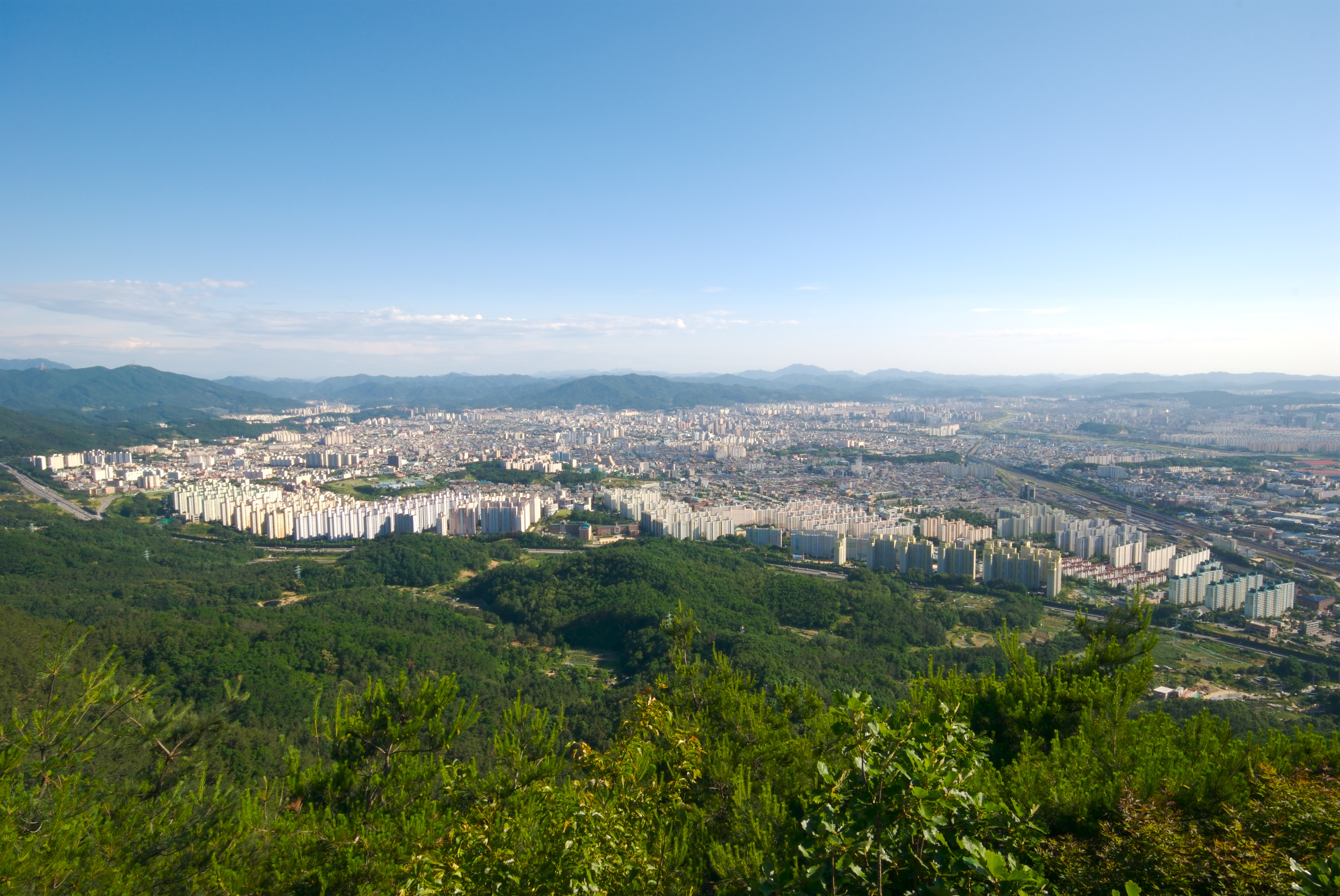
Daejeon

City	Hangul	Hanja	Province	Population (2010)
Seoul	서울	none (Note: See Seoul#Etymology and Names of Seoul.)	Special city	9,794,304
Busan	부산	釜山	Metropolitan city	3,414,950
Incheon	인천	仁川	Metropolitan city	2,662,509
Daegu	대구	大邱	Metropolitan city	2,446,418
Daejeon	대전	大田	Metropolitan city	1,501,859
Gwangju	광주	光州	Metropolitan city	1,469,293
Ulsan	울산	蔚山	Metropolitan city	1,082,567
Suwon	수원	水原	Gyeonggi	1,071,913
Changwon	창원	昌原	South Gyeongsang	1,058,021
Seongnam	성남	城南	Gyeonggi	949,964
Goyang	고양	高陽	Gyeonggi	905,076
Yongin	용인	龍仁	Gyeonggi	856,765
Bucheon	부천	富川	Gyeonggi	853,039
Ansan	안산	安山	Gyeonggi	728,775
Cheongju	청주	淸州	North Chungcheong	666,924
Jeonju	전주	全州	North Jeolla	649,728
Anyang	안양	安養	Gyeonggi	602,122
Cheonan	천안	天安	South Chungcheong	574,623
Namyangju	남양주	南楊州	Gyeonggi	529,898
Pohang	포항	浦項	North Gyeongsang	511,390

== See also ==
- Lists of cities in Asia
- Asia
  - List of metropolitan areas in Asia
  - List of urban agglomerations in Asia
- Lists of cities
- Lists of cities by country
- List of cities by continent
  - List of cities in Africa
  - List of cities in North America
  - List of cities in South America
  - List of cities in Europe
  - List of cities in Oceania
