= Lists of cities in Asia =

This is a list of cities in Asia by country.

- List of cities in Afghanistan
- List of cities in Armenia
- List of cities in Azerbaijan
- List of cities in Bahrain
- List of cities and towns in Bangladesh
- List of cities in Bhutan
- List of cities and towns in Brunei
- List of cities in Cambodia
- List of cities in China
- List of cities in Cyprus
- List of cities, towns and villages in East Timor
- List of cities in Georgia (country)
- List of cities in Hong Kong
- List of cities in India
- List of cities in Indonesia
- List of cities in Iran
- List of cities in Iraq
- List of cities in Israel
- List of cities in Japan
- List of cities in Jordan
- List of cities in Kazakhstan
- List of cities in North Korea
- List of cities in South Korea
- List of cities in Kurdistan Region
- Districts of Kuwait
- List of cities in Kyrgyzstan
- List of cities in Laos
- List of cities and towns in Lebanon
- List of cities in Macau
- List of cities in Malaysia
- List of cities, towns and villages in the Maldives
- List of cities in Mongolia
- List of cities and largest towns in Myanmar
- List of cities in Nepal
- List of cities in Oman
- List of cities in Pakistan
- List of cities administered by the Palestinian Authority
- List of cities in the Philippines
- List of cities in Qatar
- List of cities in Russia
- List of cities and towns in Saudi Arabia
- List of places in Singapore
- List of cities in Sri Lanka
- List of cities in Syria
- List of cities in Taiwan
- List of cities in Tajikistan
- List of cities in Thailand
- List of cities in Turkey
- List of cities in Turkmenistan
- List of cities in the United Arab Emirates
- List of cities in Uzbekistan
- List of cities in Vietnam
- List of cities in Yemen

== See also ==
- List of cities in East Asia
- Asia
  - List of metropolitan areas in Asia
  - List of urban agglomerations in Asia
- Lists of cities
- Lists of cities by country
- List of cities by continent
  - List of cities in Africa
  - List of cities in North America
  - List of cities in South America
  - List of cities in Europe
  - List of cities in Oceania
