= Lists of cities =

This is a list of lists of cities:

== Cities proper ==
- List of largest cities
- Lists of cities by country
- Lists of cities by continent (or continental region)
  - Lists of cities in Africa
  - Lists of cities in Asia
  - Lists of cities in Central America
  - Lists of cities in Europe
  - List of cities in North America
  - Lists of cities in Oceania
  - List of cities in South America
  - Territorial claims in Antarctica
- List of cities surrounded by another city
- List of cities by GDP
- List of cities by elevation
- List of cities by time of continuous habitation
- List of cities proper by population
- List of cities by Köppen climate classification
- List of cities with the most skyscrapers
- List of cities with more than one commercial airport
- List of city name changes
- List of largest cities throughout history
- List of national capitals
- List of ghost towns by country
- List of towns and cities with 100,000 or more inhabitants
- Lists of city flags
- World's most livable cities
- Global city

== Metropolitan areas ==
- List of metropolitan areas by population
  - List of largest metropolitan areas of the Middle East
  - List of metropolitan areas in Africa
  - List of metropolitan areas in Asia
  - List of metropolitan areas in Europe
  - List of metropolitan areas in the Americas
  - List of metropolitan areas in Northern America
  - List of metropolitan areas in the West Indies
  - List of metropolitan areas in Oceania
- List of metropolitan areas in the European Union by GDP
- List of metropolitan areas that overlap multiple countries
- List of metropolitan areas by intentional homicide

== Urban areas ==
- Historical urban community sizes
- List of the largest urban agglomerations in North America
- List of urban agglomerations in Asia
- List of urban areas by population
  - List of urban areas in Africa by population
  - List of urban areas in the European Union
  - List of urban areas in the Nordic countries
  - List of the largest population centres in Canada
  - List of United States urban areas

== See also ==
- Lists of neighborhoods by city
- Lists of cities and towns
- Lists of towns
- Lists of municipalities
- List of urban plans
