= List of cities in the Americas =

List of cities in the Americas:

- List of cities in North America
- List of cities in South America

== See also ==
- Largest cities in the Americas
