= Coeleumenes =

Scientific classification
- Domain: Eukaryota
- Kingdom: Animalia
- Phylum: Arthropoda
- Class: Insecta
- Order: Hymenoptera
- Family: Vespidae
- Subfamily: Eumeninae
- Genus: Coeleumenes; Vecht, 1963

Species
- See text

Genus of wasps

Coeleumenes is an indomalayan genus of potter wasps. The following species are classified under this genus:

- Coeleumenes burmanicus (Bingham, 1897)
- Coeleumenes impavidus (Bingham, 1897)
- Coeleumenes indianus (Saussure, 1855)
- Coeleumenes multicolor (Giordani Soika, 1935)
- Coeleumenes ruficrus Vecht, 1963
- Coeleumenes rufopetiolatus (Wickward, 1908)
- Coeleumenes rusticanus Selis, 2024
- Coeleumenes secundus (Dalla Torre, 1889)
- Coeleumenes thoracicus (Sonan, 1939)
- Coeleumenes timorensis Vecht, 1963
- Coeleumenes vindex (Smith, 1859)
