= List of cities in Australia =

The definition of a city in Australia varies between the states. State capital cities may include multiple local government areas (LGAs) within their boundaries and these LGAs may be cities in their own right. Cities listed below are those as defined by the states in which they are located. Also included are former cities that have lost city status due to LGA amalgamations or other factors.

== Capital cities ==
Geographic area	Capital
Australia	Canberra
Australian Capital Territory	Canberra
New South Wales	Sydney
Northern Territory	Darwin
Queensland	Brisbane
South Australia	Adelaide
Tasmania	Hobart
Victoria	Melbourne
Western Australia	Perth

== Australian Capital Territory ==
- Canberra (national and territory capital city)

== New South Wales ==
Since 1993, only local government areas in New South Wales can be declared as "cities" by the Government, under the Local Government Act 1993. Although the present version of the Act specifies no criteria for city status, a previous version of the Act specified that to be a city, a Council area must:

- (a) have a population of at least 25,000 persons and be an independent centre of population; not being a suburb, whether residential, industrial, commercial or maritime, of any other council area or centre of population; or
- (b) have a population of at least 150,000, and have a distinct character and entity as a centre of population beyond what would normally be regarded as being of local or suburban significance only; or
- (c) satisfy the criteria specified in paragraphs (a) or (b) apart from the population criteria, and be a homogenous centre of importance as a focus of regional commercial, governmental or cultural activity beyond that which would normally be regarded as local, suburban, or subsidiary to another nearby centre.

New South Wales, therefore, has two types of "city": cities that are acknowledged on the register of the Geographical Names Board of New South Wales, and local government areas that have been proclaimed as cities but are not acknowledged on the Geographical Names Register.

=== Cities acknowledged on the NSW Geographical Names Register ===
- Sydney (state capital)
- Albury
- Armidale
- Bathurst
- Blue Mountains (Note: City within the Sydney metropolitan area)
- Broken Hill
- Campbelltown
- Cessnock
- Dubbo
- Gosford
- Goulburn
- Grafton
- Lithgow
- Lismore
- Liverpool
- Newcastle
- Orange
- Parramatta
- Penrith
- Queanbeyan
- Tamworth
- Wagga Wagga
- Wollongong

=== Cities not acknowledged on the NSW Geographical Names Register ===
This list includes local government areas inside the Sydney metropolitan area but excludes cities also acknowledged on the Geographical Names Register:

- City of Blacktown
- City of Canada Bay
- City of Coffs Harbour
- City of Fairfield
- City of Griffith
- City of Hawkesbury
- City of Lake Macquarie
- City of Lismore
- City of Maitland
- City of Randwick
- City of Ryde
- City of Shellharbour
- City of Shoalhaven
- City of Willoughby

Former local government areas that were accorded city status (however since amalgamated) include:

- City of Bankstown (1980)
- City of Botany Bay (1995)
- City of Canterbury (1990)
- City of Dubbo (1966)
- City of Gosford (1979)
- City of Greater Taree (1980)
- City of Holroyd (1990)
- City of Hurstville (1988)
- City of Queanbeyan (1972)
- City of Rockdale (1995)

== Northern Territory ==
- Darwin (territory capital)
- Palmerston

== Queensland ==
- Brisbane (state capital)
- Bundaberg
- Cairns
- Caloundra
- Gladstone
- Gold Coast
- Gympie
- Hervey Bay
- Ipswich (Note: City within the Brisbane metropolitan area)
- Logan City
- Mackay
- Maryborough
- Mount Isa
- Rockhampton
- Sunshine Coast
- Toowoomba
- Townsville

Other towns or suburban areas whose local government was accorded city status (including those since amalgamated) include:

- Charters Towers
- Redcliffe City
- Redland City
- Thuringowa
- Warwick

== South Australia ==
- Adelaide (state capital)
- Mount Barker (Note: City within the Adelaide metropolitan area)
- Mount Gambier
- Murray Bridge
- Port Adelaide
- Port Augusta
- Port Pirie
- Port Lincoln
- Victor Harbor
- Whyalla

== Tasmania ==
- Hobart (state capital), the metropolitan area of which consists of the City of Clarence, City of Hobart, and the City of Glenorchy
- Launceston
- Devonport
- Ulverstone
- Burnie

== Victoria ==
- Melbourne (state capital)
- Ararat
- Bairnsdale
- Benalla
- Ballarat
- Bendigo
- Dandenong (Note: City within the Melbourne metropolitan area)
- Frankston
- Geelong
- Hamilton
- Horsham
- Latrobe City
- Melton
- Mildura
- Sale
- Shepparton
- Swan Hill
- Wangaratta
- Warrnambool
- Wodonga

== Western Australia ==
- Perth (state capital)
- Albany
- Bunbury
- Busselton
- Fremantle (Note: City within the Perth metropolitan area)
- Geraldton
- Joondalup
- Kalgoorlie
- Karratha
- Mandurah
- Rockingham

Local government areas with city status not listed above, all of which lie within Perth's metropolitan area, include:

- City of Armadale
- City of Bayswater
- City of Canning
- City of Cockburn
- City of Gosnells
- City of Kalamunda
- City of Kwinana
- City of Melville
- City of Nedlands
- City of South Perth
- City of Stirling
- City of Subiaco
- City of Swan
- City of Wanneroo

== See also ==
- List of cities in Australia by population
- Lists of cities by country
- Lists of cities in Oceania
- List of cities in Oceania by population
