= Nannoarctia integra =

Scientific classification
- Kingdom: Animalia
- Phylum: Arthropoda
- Class: Insecta
- Order: Lepidoptera
- Superfamily: Noctuoidea
- Family: Erebidae
- Subfamily: Arctiinae
- Genus: Nannoarctia
- Species: N. integra

Binomial name
- Nannoarctia integra (Walker, 1855)

Synonyms
- Aloa integra Walker, 1855; Rajendra integra; Pericallia integra

Species of moth

Nannoarctia integra, described by Francis Walker in 1855, is an endemic species of moth in the family Erebidae from the Philippines. The species is often confused with N. takanoi (Sonan, 1934) (=integra Matsumura, 1931) from Taiwan.
