= Nannoarctia takanoi =

Scientific classification
- Domain: Eukaryota
- Kingdom: Animalia
- Phylum: Arthropoda
- Class: Insecta
- Order: Lepidoptera
- Superfamily: Noctuoidea
- Family: Erebidae
- Subfamily: Arctiinae
- Genus: Nannoarctia
- Species: N. takanoi

Binomial name
- Nannoarctia takanoi (Sonan, 1934)

Synonyms
- Pericallia takanoi Sonan, 1934

Species of moth

Nannoarctia takanoi, described by Jinhaku Sonan in 1934, is an endemic species of moth in the family Erebidae from Taiwan. It is probably extinct now; no specimens have been collected since World War II. The species was formerly known as Pericallia integra Matsumura, 1931, but specimens from Taiwan are not conspecific to those from the Philippines, where N. integra (Walker, 1855) occur.
