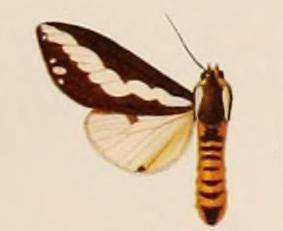

Scientific classification
- Domain: Eukaryota
- Kingdom: Animalia
- Phylum: Arthropoda
- Class: Insecta
- Order: Lepidoptera
- Superfamily: Noctuoidea
- Family: Erebidae
- Subfamily: Arctiinae
- Subtribe: Spilosomina
- Genus: Nannoarctia; Kôda, 1988

Type species
- Pericallia integra Matsumura, 1931

= Nannoarctia =

Genus of moths

Nannoarctia is a genus of moths in the family Erebidae. The genus was erected by Nobutoyo Kôda in 1988.

== Species ==
- Nannoarctia conjuncta (Hampson, 1901)
  - Nannoarctia conjuncta javanica Dubatolov, Haynes & Kishida, 2010
  - Nannoarctia conjuncta sumbana Dubatolov, Haynes & Kishida, 2010
  - Nannoarctia conjuncta williami (Rothschild, 1910)
- Nannoarctia himalayana Dubatolov, Haynes & Kishida, 2010
  - Nannoarctia himalayana nepalica Dubatolov, Haynes & Kishida, 2010
- Nannoarctia integra (Walker, 1855)
- Nannoarctia obliquifascia (Hampson, 1894)
- Nannoarctia takanoi (Sonan, 1934)
- Nannoarctia tripartita (Walker, 1855)

=== Subgenus Pseudorajendra Dubatolov, Haynes & Kishida, 2007 ===
- Nannoarctia dentata (Walker, 1855)
