= List of metropolitan areas in Oceania by population =

List of the most populous metropolitan areas in Oceania

This list ranks metropolitan areas in Oceania by their population; it includes metropolitan areas that have a population of over 100,000 people

== Sources and definitions ==
Metropolitan areas are listed as defined by their jurisdiction.

For Australia, metropolitan areas are defined as per the Greater Capital City Statistical Area (GCCSA) or Significant Urban Area (SUA) designations of the Australian Statistical Geography Standard (ASGS), as appropriate.

For New Zealand, metropolitan areas are defined as per the Functional Urban Area (FUA) classification and population statistics are sourced from the Statistics New Zealand population estimates and projections.

For the United States, metropolitan areas are defined as per the Metropolitan Statistical Area (MSA) as defined by The United States Office of Management and Budget.

== Metropolitan areas ==
Rank	Metropolitan area name	Country	Population	Urban area (km^{2})	Urban population density (people/km^{2})	Territorial area (km^{2})	Regions and municipalities encompassed
1	Greater Sydney	Australia	5,367,206	2,554.00	2,101	16,367.70	Sydney, Parramatta, Penrith, Greater Western Sydney, Blue Mountains
2	Greater Melbourne	Australia	5,159,211	2,453.00	2,103	9,993.00	Melbourne, Bacchus Marsh, Gisborne-Macedon, Melton
3	Greater Brisbane	Australia	2,560,720	1,342.70	1,025	15,842.00	City of Brisbane, Ipswich, Logan City, Moreton Bay, Redland City
4	Greater Perth	Australia	2,309,338	1,150.00	1,089	6,417.90	Perth, Yanchep
5	Auckland	New Zealand	1,794,400	747.50	2,410	3,358.80	Auckland, Hibiscus Coast, Pukekohe, Helensville, Waimauku, Kumeu-Huapai, Riverhead, Beachlands-Pine Harbour, Maraetai, Waiuku, Tuakau, Pokeno
6	Greater Adelaide	Australia	1,359,760	750.44	1,393	3,259.80	Adelaide, Adelaide Hills
7	Urban Honolulu	United States	1,016,508	440.70	2,238	1,560.00	Honolulu, Honolulu County
8	Port Moresby	Papua New Guinea	756,754	266.50	2,840		Port Moresby
9	Gold Coast–Tweed Heads	Australia	709,495	648.00	926		Gold Coast, Tweed Heads
10	Christchurch	New Zealand	556,500	387.20	1,290	2,408.10	Christchurch, Rolleston, Lincoln, Prebbleton, Leeston, West Melton, Kaiapoi, Rangiora, Woodend, Pegasus
11	Newcastle–Maitland	Australia	498,095	441.20	907		Newcastle, Maitland
12	Canberra–Queanbeyan	Australia	464,995	401.40	1,158	2,342.00	Canberra, Queanbeyan
13	Wellington	New Zealand	441,200	379.72	1,309	1,754.90	Wellington, Porirua, Lower Hutt, Upper Hutt, Featherston, Greytown
14	Jayapura	Indonesia	398,478	935.9	274	940.00	Jayapura
15	Sunshine Coast	Australia	348,343	321.00	758		Sunshine Coast, Noosa
16	Sorong	Indonesia	345,342	656.60	290		Sorong, Sorong Regency
17	Central Coast	Australia	337,284	1,681.00	206		Gosford, Wyong, Terrigal
18	Wollongong	Australia	309,345	684.00	323		Wollongong
19	Geelong	Australia	282,412	168.60	932		Geelong
20	Greater Suva Area	Fiji	268,423	155.89	1,722	521	Suva, Nasinu, Nausori, Lami
21	Hamilton	New Zealand	235,700	119.80	1,617	1,412.70	Hamilton, Ngaruawahia
22	Hobart	Australia	219,071	77.91	696		Hobart
23	Lae	Papua New Guinea	203,056	130.89	1,551		Lae, Ahi Rural LLG
24	Tauranga	New Zealand	184,000	139.20	1,132	790.20	Tauranga, Omokoroa
25	Townsville	Australia	183,322	261.30	646		Townsville
26	Greater Nouméa	New Caledonia	173,814	122.45	1489	1,643.00	Nouméa, Dumbéa, Le Mont-Dore, Païta
27	Honiara Urban Area	Solomon Islands	169,721	133.00	1,276	2,746	Honiara, Tandai, Malango
28	Kahului–Wailuku	United States	164,754	295.18	526		Kahului, Wailuku, Lāhainā, Kīhei
29	Cairns	Australia	155,340	198.60	729		Cairns
30	Dededo-Machanao-Apotgan Urban Cluster	Guam	139,825	93.6	677		Dededo, Machanao, Apotgan
31	Toowoomba	Australia	139,526	114.1	877		Toowoomba
32	Darwin	Australia	133,268	111.30	727		Darwin
33	Dunedin	New Zealand	131,600	163.10	410	1,033.8	Dunedin, Brighton, Mosgiel, Port Chalmers, Waikouaiti
34	Papeʻete Urban Area	French Polynesia	124,274	299.50	415	457	Papeʻete, Pīraʻe, ʻĀrue, Māhina, Faʻaʻā, Punaʻauia
35	Ballarat	Australia	109,533	739.00	153		Ballarat
36	Manokwari	Indonesia	107,325	392.08	274	8,665	Manokwari
37	Bendigo	Australia	102,499	164.90	560		Bendigo

== See also ==
- List of cities in Oceania by population
- Lists of cities in Oceania
