= List of cities in North America =

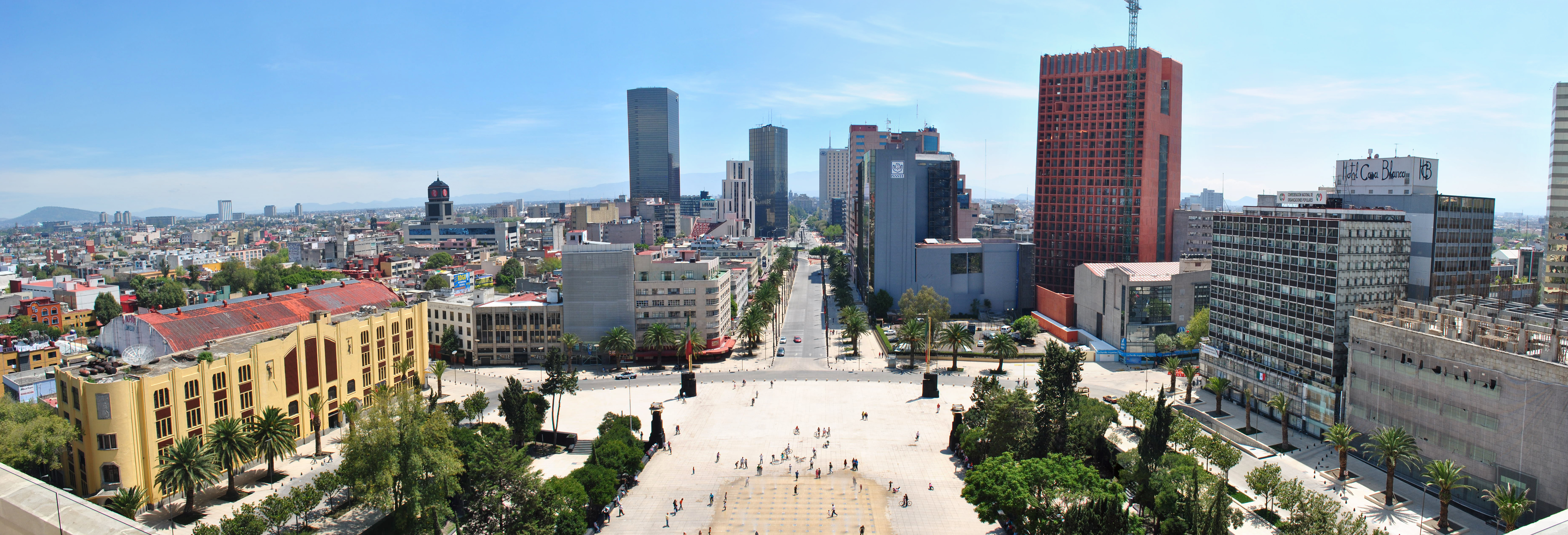
Mexico City is the most populous city of Mexico and North America

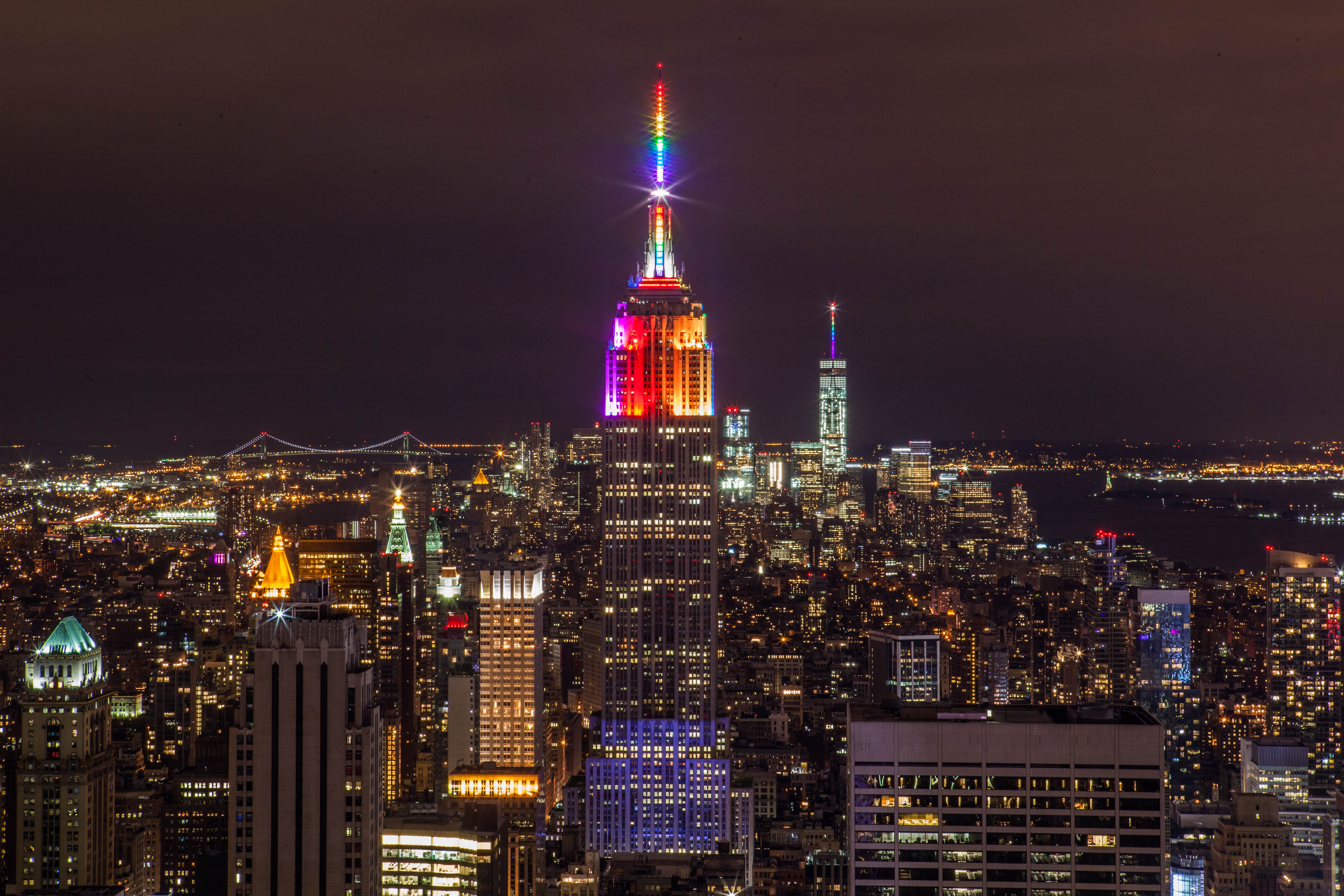
New York City is the most populous city in the United States, and the second-most in North America

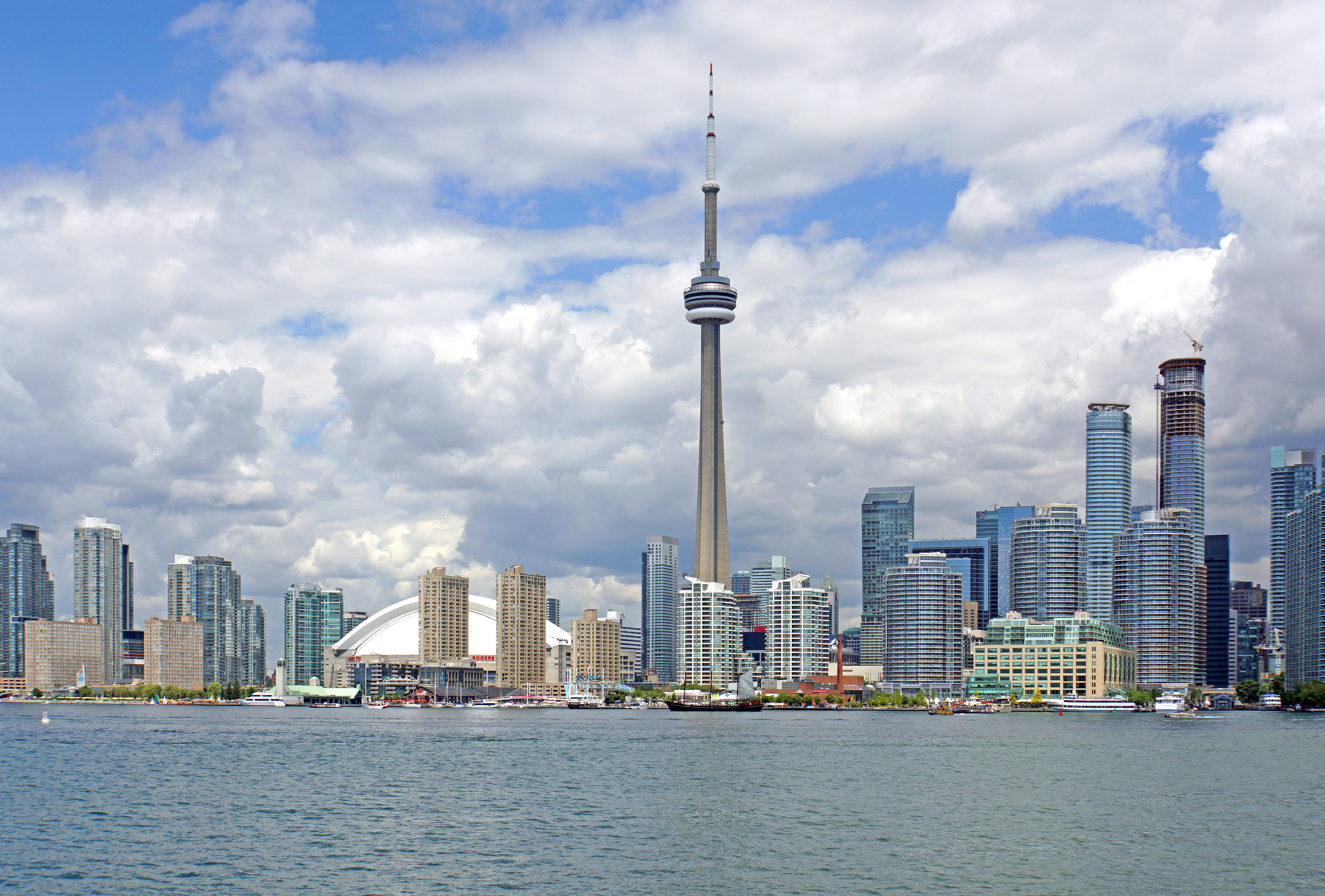
Toronto is the most populous city in Canada, and the fourth-most in North America

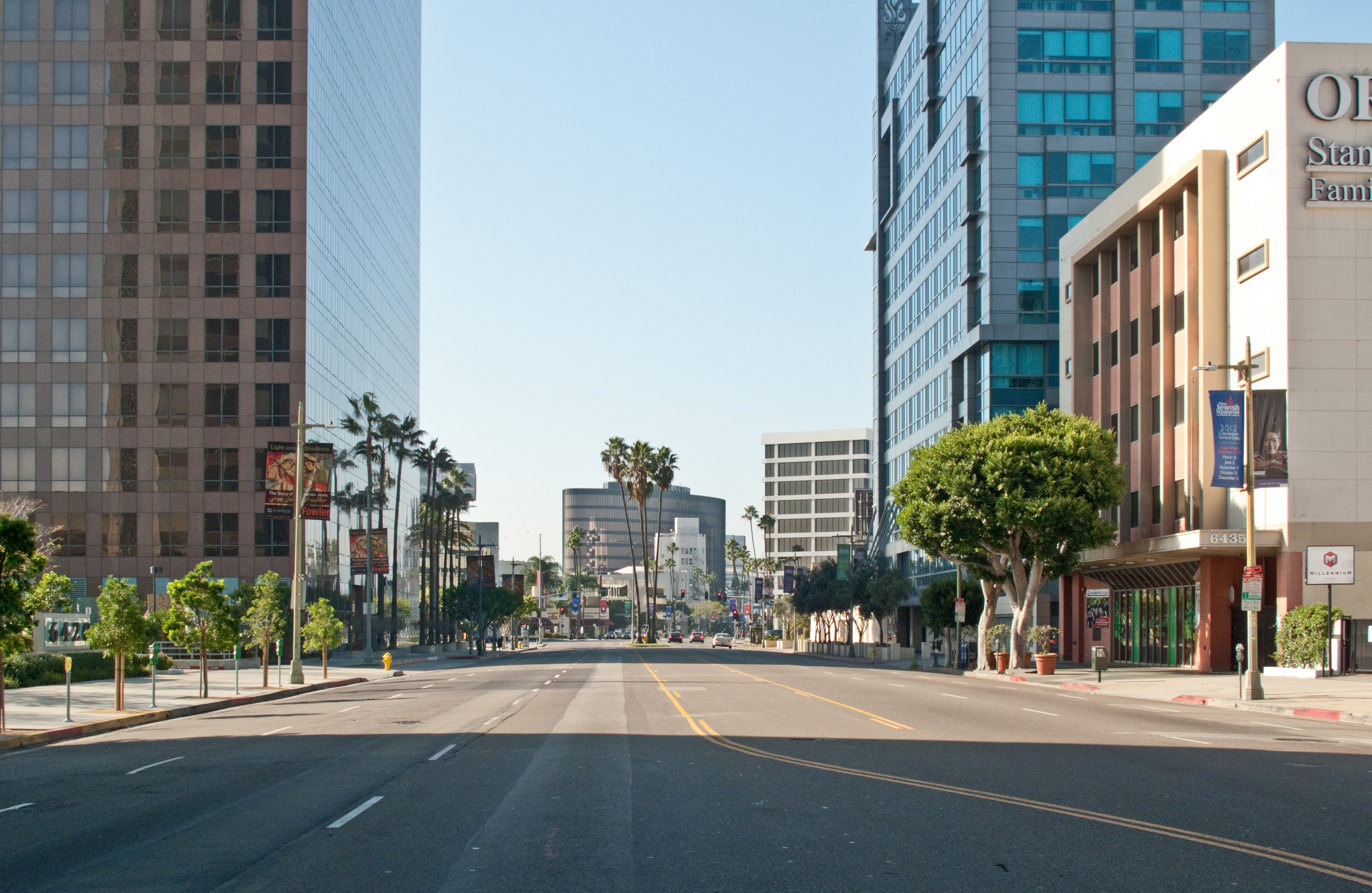
Los Angeles, the most populous city on the Pacific coast of North America

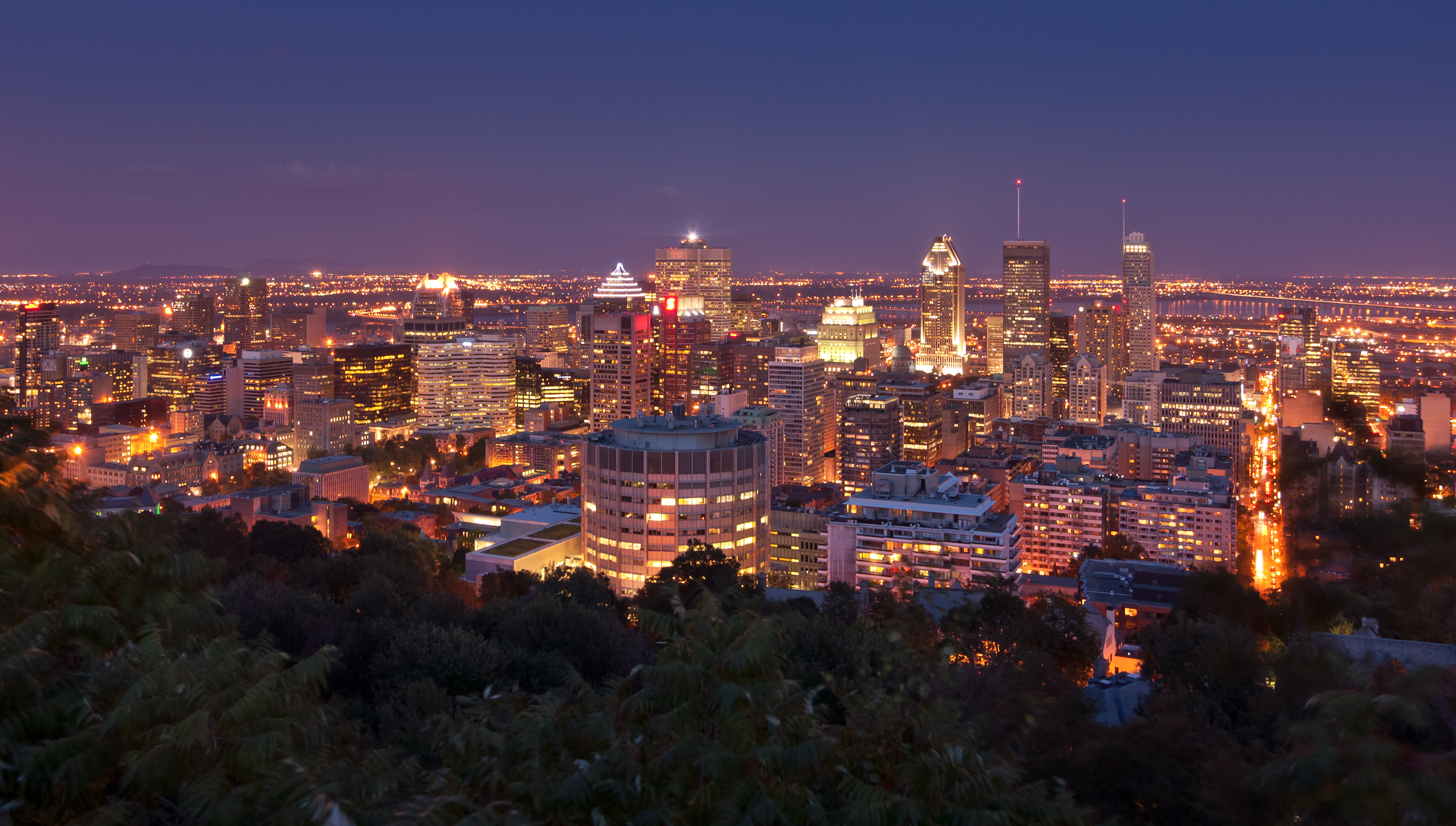
Montreal is the most populous French-speaking city in North America

This is a list of cities in North America. For the most populous cities in North America, see List of North American cities by population.

== Aruba ==
- Oranjestad

== Bahamas ==
- Nassau
- Freeport City

== Barbados ==
- Bridgetown

== Belize ==
- Belize City
- Belmopan

== Canada ==
- Toronto, Ontario
- Montreal, Québec
- Vancouver, British Columbia
- Ottawa, Ontario
- Calgary, Alberta
- Edmonton, Alberta
- Winnipeg, Manitoba
- Québec City, Québec
- Saskatoon, Saskatchewan
- Regina, Saskatchewan
- Halifax, Nova Scotia

== Cayman Islands ==
- George Town

== Cuba ==
- Havana
- Santiago de Cuba

== Dominica ==
- Roseau

== Dominican Republic ==
- Santo Domingo
- Santiago de los Caballeros
- San Felipe de Puerto Plata

== El Salvador ==
- San Salvador
- San Miguel
- Santa Ana

== Greenland ==
- Nuuk
- Sisimiut
- Ilulissat
- Qaqortoq
- Aasiaat

== Guatemala ==
- Guatemala City

== Haiti ==
- Port-au-Prince
  - Delmas
  - Pétion-Ville
- Cap-Haïtien
- Gonaïves
- Port-de-Paix
- Jacmel
- Les Cayes
- Jérémie

== Honduras ==
- Tegucigalpa
- San Pedro Sula
- Choloma
- La Ceiba
- El Progreso
- Choluteca
- Comayagua
- Puerto Cortés
- La Lima
- Danlí

== Jamaica ==
- Kingston
- Montego Bay
- Spanish Town
- Portmore
- Ocho Rios

== Mexico ==
- Mexico City
- Guadalajara
- Monterrey
- Puebla
- Toluca
- Tijuana
- Chihuahua
- Juárez
- León
- Torreón
- San Luis Potosí
- Mérida
- Acapulco
- Cancún
- Los Cabos
- Cuernavaca
- Pachuca
- Querétaro

== Nicaragua ==
- Managua
- Leon

== Puerto Rico ==
- San Juan

== Saint Lucia ==
- Castries

== Trinidad and Tobago ==
- Port of Spain
- San Fernando
- Chaguanas
- Arima
- Couva
- Point Fortin
- Scarborough
- Tunapuna
- Diego Martin
- Princes Town
- Penal
- Siparia
- San Juan
- Sangre Grande
- Mayaro

== Turks and Caicos Islands ==
- Cockburn Town

== United States ==
- New York City, New York
- Washington, D.C.
- Buffalo, New York
- Boston, Massachusetts
- Philadelphia, Pennsylvania
- Chicago, Illinois
- Detroit, Michigan
- New Orleans, Louisiana
- Miami, Florida
- Atlanta, Georgia
- Dallas, Texas
- Houston, Texas
- Los Angeles, California
- Las Vegas, Nevada
- San Francisco, California
- Phoenix, Arizona
- Seattle, Washington
- Jacksonville, Florida
- Austin, Texas
- San Antonio, Texas
- Milwaukee, Wisconsin
- Little Rock, Arkansas

== United States Virgin Islands ==
- Charlotte Amalie

== See also ==
- North America
  - List of North American cities by year of foundation
  - List of the largest urban agglomerations in North America
  - List of North American metropolitan areas by population
  - List of Metropolitan Statistical Areas
- Lists of cities
  - Largest cities in the Americas
- Cities of present-day nations and states
- List of cities by continent
  - List of cities in South America
  - List of cities in Africa
  - List of cities in Asia
  - List of cities in Europe
  - List of cities in Oceania
