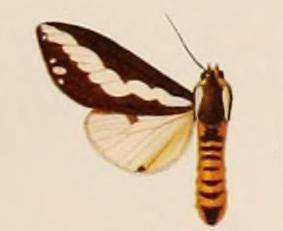

Scientific classification
- Kingdom: Animalia
- Phylum: Arthropoda
- Class: Insecta
- Order: Lepidoptera
- Superfamily: Noctuoidea
- Family: Erebidae
- Subfamily: Arctiinae
- Genus: Nannoarctia
- Species: N. conjuncta

Binomial name
- Nannoarctia conjuncta (Hampson, 1901)

Synonyms
- Pericallia conjuncta Hampson, 1901; Pericallia williami Rothschild, 1910; Nannoarctia williami

= Nannoarctia conjuncta =

Species of moth

Nannoarctia conjuncta is a moth of the family Erebidae first described by George Hampson in 1901. It is found in Indonesia.

== Subspecies ==
- Nannoarctia conjuncta conjuncta (Lombok Island)
- Nannoarctia conjuncta javanica Dubatolov, Haynes & Kishida, 2010 (Java)
- Nannoarctia conjuncta sumbana Dubatolov, Haynes & Kishida, 2010 (Sumba Island)
- Nannoarctia conjuncta williami (Rothschild, 1910) (Bali)
