= Nannoarctia dentata =

Scientific classification
- Kingdom: Animalia
- Phylum: Arthropoda
- Class: Insecta
- Order: Lepidoptera
- Superfamily: Noctuoidea
- Family: Erebidae
- Subfamily: Arctiinae
- Genus: Nannoarctia
- Species: N. dentata

Binomial name
- Nannoarctia dentata (Walker, 1855)

Synonyms
- Aloa dentata Walker, 1855; Nannoarctia (Pseudorajendra) dentata; Rajendra dentata; Alphaea dentata; Pericallia dentata; Aloa khandalla Moore, 1859; Rajendra khandalla

Species of moth

Nannoarctia dentata is a moth of the family Erebidae. It is found in India.
