= Nannoarctia obliquifascia =

Scientific classification
- Kingdom: Animalia
- Phylum: Arthropoda
- Class: Insecta
- Order: Lepidoptera
- Superfamily: Noctuoidea
- Family: Erebidae
- Subfamily: Arctiinae
- Genus: Nannoarctia
- Species: N. obliquifascia

Binomial name
- Nannoarctia obliquifascia (Hampson, 1894)

Synonyms
- Aloa tripartita Walker, 1855; Pericallia obliquifascia; Alphaea obliquifascia; Creatonotus obliquifascia nigrescens Mell, 1935

Species of moth

Nannoarctia obliquifascia is a moth of the family Erebidae first described by George Hampson in 1894. It is found in Myanmar, Thailand, Vietnam, the Malay Peninsula and southern China (southern Sichuan, Yunnan, Guangxi, Guangdong and Hainan).
