= Nannoarctia tripartita =

Scientific classification
- Kingdom: Animalia
- Phylum: Arthropoda
- Class: Insecta
- Order: Lepidoptera
- Superfamily: Noctuoidea
- Family: Erebidae
- Subfamily: Arctiinae
- Genus: Nannoarctia
- Species: N. tripartita

Binomial name
- Nannoarctia tripartita (Walker, 1855)

Synonyms
- Aloa tripartita Walker, 1855; Pericallia tripartita

Species of moth

Nannoarctia tripartita is a moth of the family Erebidae first described by Francis Walker in 1855. It is found in Myanmar, Thailand, Laos and Yunnan, China.

== Description ==
The length of the Nannoarctia tripartita forewings is 15–18 mm for females and 14–17 mm for males.
