= Nannoarctia himalayana =

Scientific classification
- Kingdom: Animalia
- Phylum: Arthropoda
- Clade: Pancrustacea
- Class: Insecta
- Order: Lepidoptera
- Superfamily: Noctuoidea
- Family: Erebidae
- Subfamily: Arctiinae
- Genus: Nannoarctia
- Species: N. himalayana

Binomial name
- Nannoarctia himalayana Dubatolov, Haynes & Kishida, 2010

Species of moth

Nannoarctia himalayana is a moth of the family Erebidae first described by Vladimir Viktorovitch Dubatolov, Patrick G. Haynes and Yasunori Kishida in 2010. It is found in Nepal and India.

The length of the forewings is 17–17.5 mm for subspecies himalayana and 16–18 mm for subspecies nepalica.

== Subspecies ==
- Nannoarctia himalayana himalayana (India: Himachal Pradesh and probably Kashmir)
- Nannoarctia himalayana nepalica Dubatolov, Haynes & Kishida, 2010 (Nepal and India: Uttar Pradesh, Assam and probably Nagaland)
