= List of metropolitan areas in Northern America =

This is a list of metropolitan areas in Northern America, typically defined to include Canada and the United States as well as Bermuda (UK), Greenland (Denmark), and St. Pierre and Miquelon (France). Northern America is sometimes listed separate from Central America, the Caribbean, and Mexico due to cultural and economic differences between the two regions within North America and in fact most are considered part of Latin America. This list only includes those metropolitan areas in Canada and the United States as the other territories in Northern America lack sufficient population to have a metropolitan area. For Canada this list includes population of the metropolitan areas in the country as counted by both the 2001 and 2011 Canadian Censuses. For the United States the data comes from both the 2000 and 2010 United States Censuses. Using decennial census data from both countries allows for the opportunities to compare growth rates between metropolitan areas in both countries. Due to slight differences in how a metropolitan area is defined by both the U.S. Census Bureau and Statistics Canada, only metropolitan statistical areas (MSAs) used in the United States and census metropolitan areas (CMAs) used in Canada are included in the table, while micropolitan statistical areas (μSAs) and census agglomerations (CAs) are not, as they are not defined as metropolitan areas by their respective agencies.

== Table ==
Metropolitan areas in Northern America
Rank	Metropolitan area	Latest census data (2011 CA/2010 US)	Data from previous decennial census (2001 CA/2000 US)	Change
1	New York-Northern New Jersey-Long Island, NY-NJ-PA MSA	18,897,109	18,323,002	+3.13%
2	Los Angeles-Long Beach-Santa Ana, CA MSA	12,828,837	12,365,627	+3.75%
3	Chicago-Joliet-Naperville, IL-IN-WI MSA	9,461,105	9,098,316	+3.99%
4	Dallas-Fort Worth-Arlington, TX MSA	6,371,773	5,161,544	+23.45%
5	Philadelphia-Camden-Wilmington, PA-NJ-DE-MD MSA	5,965,343	5,687,147	+4.89%
6	Houston-Sugar Land-Baytown, TX MSA	5,946,800	4,715,407	+26.11%
7	Toronto, ON CMA	5,583,064	4,682,897	+19.22%
8	Washington-Arlington-Alexandria, DC-VA-MD-WV MSA	5,582,170	4,796,183	+16.39%
9	Miami-Fort Lauderdale-Pompano Beach, FL MSA	5,564,635	5,007,564	+11.12%
10	Atlanta-Sandy Springs-Marietta, GA MSA	5,268,860	4,247,981	+24.03%
11	Boston-Cambridge-Quincy, MA-NH MSA	4,552,402	4,391,344	+3.67%
12	San Francisco-Oakland-Fremont, CA MSA	4,335,391	4,123,740	+5.13%
13	Detroit-Warren-Livonia, MI MSA	4,296,250	4,452,557	−3.51%
14	Riverside-San Bernardino-Ontario, CA MSA	4,224,851	3,254,821	+29.80%
15	Phoenix-Mesa-Glendale, AZ MSA	4,192,887	3,251,876	+28.94%
16	Montreal, QC CMA	3,824,221	3,426,350	+11.61%
17	Seattle-Tacoma-Bellevue, WA MSA	3,439,809	3,043,878	+13.01%
18	Minneapolis–St. Paul–Bloomington, MN–WI MSA	3,317,308	2,968,806	+11.74%
19	San Diego-Carlsbad-San Marcos, CA MSA	3,095,313	2,813,833	+10.00%
20	St. Louis, MO-IL MSA	2,812,896	2,698,687	+4.23%
21	Tampa-St. Petersburg-Clearwater, FL MSA	2,783,243	2,395,997	+16.16%
22	Baltimore-Towson, MD MSA	2,710,489	2,552,994	+6.17%
23	Denver-Aurora-Broomfield, CO MSA	2,543,482	2,179,240	+16.71%
24	Vancouver, BC CMA	2,476,145	1,986,965	+24.62%
25	Pittsburgh, PA MSA	2,356,285	2,431,087	−3.08%
26	Portland-Vancouver-Hillsboro, OR-WA MSA	2,226,009	1,927,881	+15.46%
27	Sacramento–Arden-Arcade–Roseville, CA MSA	2,149,127	1,796,857	+19.60%
28	San Antonio-New Braunfels, TX MSA	2,142,508	1,711,703	+25.17%
29	Orlando-Kissimmee-Sanford, FL MSA	2,134,411	1,644,561	+29.79%
30	Cincinnati-Middletown, OH-KY-IN MSA	2,130,151	2,009,632	+6.00%
31	Cleveland-Elyria-Mentor, OH MSA	2,077,240	2,148,143	−3.30%
32	Kansas City, MO-KS MSA	2,035,334	1,836,038	+10.85%
33	Las Vegas-Paradise, NV MSA	1,951,269	1,375,765	+41.83%
34	San Jose-Sunnyvale-Santa Clara, CA MSA	1,836,911	1,735,819	+5.82%
35	Columbus, OH MSA	1,836,536	1,612,694	+13.88%
36	Charlotte-Gastonia-Rock Hill, NC-SC MSA	1,758,038	1,330,448	+32.14%
37	Indianapolis-Carmel, IN MSA	1,756,241	1,525,104	+15.16%
38	Austin-Round Rock-San Marcos, TX MSA	1,716,289	1,249,763	+37.33%
39	Virginia Beach-Norfolk-Newport News, VA-NC MSA	1,671,683	1,576,370	+6.05%
40	Providence-New Bedford-Fall River, RI-MA MSA	1,600,852	1,582,997	+1.13%
41	Nashville-Davidson–Murfreesboro–Franklin, TN MSA	1,589,934	1,311,789	+21.20%
42	Milwaukee-Waukesha-West Allis, WI MSA	1,555,908	1,500,741	+3.68%
43	Jacksonville, FL MSA	1,345,596	1,122,750	+19.85%
44	Memphis, TN-MS-AR MSA	1,316,100	1,205,204	+9.20%
45	Louisville/Jefferson County, KY-IN MSA	1,307,647	1,161,975	+12.54%
46	Richmond, VA MSA	1,258,251	1,096,957	+14.70%
47	Oklahoma City, OK MSA	1,252,987	1,095,421	+14.38%
48	Ottawa-Gatineau, ON-QC CMA	1,236,324	1,063,664	+16.23%
49	Calgary, AB CMA	1,214,839	951,395	+27.69%
50	Hartford-East Hartford-Middletown, CT MSA	1,212,381	1,148,618	+5.55%
51	New Orleans-Metairie-Kenner, LA MSA	1,167,764	1,316,510	−11.30%
52	Edmonton, AB CMA	1,159,869	937,845	+23.67%
53	Buffalo-Niagara Falls, NY MSA	1,135,509	1,170,111	−2.96%
54	Raleigh-Cary, NC MSA	1,130,490	797,071	+41.83%
55	Birmingham-Hoover, AL MSA	1,128,047	1,052,238	+7.20%
56	Salt Lake City, UT MSA	1,124,197	968,858	+16.03%
57	Rochester, NY MSA	1,054,323	1,037,831	+1.59%
58	Tucson, AZ MSA	980,263	843,746	+16.18%
59	Honolulu, HI MSA	953,207	876,156	+8.79%
60	Tulsa, OK MSA	937,478	859,532	+9.07%
61	Fresno, CA MSA	930,450	799,407	+16.39%
62	Bridgeport-Stamford-Norwalk, CT MSA	916,829	882,567	+3.88%
63	Albuquerque, NM MSA	907,755	729,649	+24.41%
64	Albany-Schenectady-Troy, NY MSA	870,716	825,875	+5.43%
65	Omaha-Council Bluffs, NE-IA MSA	865,350	767,041	+12.82%
66	New Haven-Milford, CT MSA	862,477	824,008	+4.67%
67	Dayton, OH MSA	841,502	848,153	−0.78%
68	Bakersfield-Delano, CA MSA	839,631	661,645	+26.90%
69	Oxnard-Thousand Oaks-Ventura, CA MSA	823,318	753,197	+9.31%
70	Allentown-Bethlehem-Easton, PA-NJ MSA	821,173	740,395	+10.91%
71	Baton Rouge, LA MSA	802,484	705,973	+13.67%
72	El Paso, TX MSA	800,647	679,622	+17.81%
73	Worcester, MA MSA	798,552	750,963	+6.34%
74	McAllen-Edinburg-Mission, TX MSA	774,769	569,463	+36.05%
75	Grand Rapids-Wyoming, MI MSA	774,160	740,482	+4.55%
76	Columbia, SC MSA	767,598	647,158	+18.61%
77	Quebec City, QC CMA	765,706	682,757	+12.15%
78	Winnipeg, MB CMA	730,018	671,274	+8.75%
79	Greensboro-High Point, NC MSA	723,801	643,430	+12.49%
80	Hamilton, ON CMA	721,053	662,401	+8.85%
81	Akron, OH MSA	703,200	694,960	+1.19%
82	North Port-Bradenton-Sarasota, FL MSA	702,281	589,959	+19.04%
83	Little Rock-North Little Rock-Conway, AR MSA	699,757	610,518	+14.62%
84	Knoxville, TN MSA	698,030	616,079	+13.30%
85	Springfield, MA MSA	692,942	680,014	+1.90%
86	Stockton, CA MSA	685,306	563,598	+21.59%
87	Poughkeepsie-Newburgh-Middletown, NY MSA	670,301	621,517	+7.85%
88	Charleston-North Charleston-Summerville, SC MSA	664,607	549,033	+21.05%
89	Syracuse, NY MSA	662,577	650,154	+1.91%
90	Toledo, OH MSA	651,429	659,188	−1.18%
91	Colorado Springs, CO MSA	645,613	537,484	+20.12%
92	Greenville-Mauldin-Easley, SC MSA	636,986	559,940	+13.76%
93	Wichita, KS MSA	623,061	571,166	+9.09%
94	Cape Coral-Fort Myers, FL MSA	618,754	440,888	+40.34%
95	Boise City-Nampa, ID MSA	616,561	464,840	+32.64%
96	Lakeland-Winter Haven, FL MSA	602,095	483,924	+24.42%
97	Des Moines-West Des Moines, IA MSA	569,633	481,394	+18.33%
98	Madison, WI MSA	568,593	501,774	+13.32%
99	Youngstown-Warren-Boardman, OH-PA MSA	565,773	602,964	−6.17%
100	Scranton–Wilkes-Barre, PA MSA	563,631	560,625	+0.54%
101	Augusta-Richmond County, GA-SC MSA	556,877	499,684	+11.45%
102	Harrisburg-Carlisle, PA MSA	549,475	509,074	+7.94%
103	Ogden-Clearfield, UT MSA	547,184	442,656	+23.61%
104	Palm Bay-Melbourne-Titusville, FL MSA	543,376	476,230	+14.10%
105	Jackson, MS MSA	539,057	497,197	+8.42%
106	Chattanooga, TN-GA MSA	528,143	476,531	+10.83%
107	Provo-Orem, UT MSA	526,810	376,774	+39.82%
108	Lancaster, PA MSA	519,445	470,658	+10.37%
109	Modesto, CA MSA	514,453	446,997	+15.09%
110	Portland-South Portland-Biddeford, ME MSA	514,098	487,568	+5.44%
111	Durham-Chapel Hill, NC MSA	504,357	426,493	+18.26%
112	Deltona-Daytona Beach-Ormond Beach, FL MSA	494,593	443,343	+11.56%
113	Santa Rosa-Petaluma, CA MSA	483,878	458,614	+5.51%
114	Winston-Salem, NC MSA	477,717	421,961	+13.21%
115	Kitchener-Cambridge-Waterloo, ON CMA	477,160	414,284	+15.18%
116	London, ON CMA	474,786	432,451	+9.79%
117	Lexington-Fayette, KY MSA	472,099	408,326	+15.62%
118	Spokane, WA MSA	471,221	417,939	+12.75%
119	Lansing-East Lansing, MI MSA	464,036	447,728	+3.64%
120	Fayetteville-Springdale-Rogers, AR-MO MSA	463,204	347,045	+33.47%
121	Pensacola-Ferry Pass-Brent, FL MSA	448,991	412,153	+8.94%
122	Visalia-Porterville, CA MSA	442,179	368,021	+20.15%
123	Springfield, MO MSA	436,712	368,374	+18.55%
124	York-Hanover, PA MSA	434,972	381,751	+13.94%
125	Corpus Christi, TX MSA	428,185	403,280	+6.18%
126	Flint, MI MSA	425,790	436,141	−2.37%
127	Reno-Sparks, NV MSA	425,417	342,885	+24.07%
128	Asheville, NC MSA	424,858	369,171	+15.08%
129	Port St. Lucie, FL MSA	424,107	319,426	+32.77%
130	Santa Barbara-Santa Maria-Goleta, CA MSA	423,895	399,347	+6.15%
131	Huntsville, AL MSA	417,593	342,376	+21.97%
132	Fort Wayne, IN MSA	416,257	390,156	+6.69%
133	Salinas, CA MSA	415,057	401,762	+3.31%
134	Vallejo-Fairfield, CA MSA	413,344	394,542	+4.77%
135	Mobile, AL MSA	412,992	399,843	+3.29%
136	Reading, PA MSA	411,442	373,638	+10.12%
137	Brownsville-Harlingen, TX MSA	406,220	335,227	+21.18%
138	Killeen-Temple-Fort Hood, TX MSA	405,300	330,714	+22.55%
139	Canton-Massillon, OH MSA	404,422	406,934	−0.62%
140	Manchester-Nashua, NH MSA	400,721	380,841	+5.22%
141	Shreveport-Bossier City, LA MSA	398,604	375,965	+6.02%
142	St. Catharines-Niagara, ON CMA	392,184	377,009	+4.03%
143	Salem, OR MSA	390,738	347,214	+12.54%
144	Halifax, NS CMA	390,328	359,183	+8.67%
145	Beaumont-Port Arthur, TX MSA	388,745	385,090	+0.95%
146	Anchorage, AK MSA	380,821	319,605	+19.15%
147	Davenport-Moline-Rock Island, IA-IL MSA	379,690	376,019	+0.98%
148	Peoria, IL MSA	379,186	366,899	+3.35%
149	Montgomery, AL MSA	374,536	346,528	+8.08%
150	Tallahassee, FL MSA	367,413	320,304	+14.71%
151	Trenton-Princeton, NJ MSA	366,513	350,761	+4.49%
152	Fayetteville, NC MSA	366,383	336,609	+8.85%
153	Hickory-Lenoir-Morganton, NC MSA	365,497	341,851	+6.92%
154	Wilmington, NC MSA	362,315	274,532	+31.98%
155	Evansville, IN-KY MSA	358,676	342,815	+4.63%
156	Oshawa, ON CMA	356,177	296,298	+20.21%
157	Eugene-Springfield, OR MSA	351,715	322,959	+8.90%
158	Rockford, IL MSA	349,431	320,204	+9.13%
159	Savannah, GA MSA	347,611	293,000	+18.64%
160	Ann Arbor, MI MSA	344,791	322,895	+6.78%
161	Victoria, BC CMA	344,615	311,902	+10.49%
162	Ocala, FL MSA	331,298	258,916	+27.96%
163	Kalamazoo-Portage, MI MSA	326,589	314,866	+3.72%
164	Naples-Marco Island, FL MSA	321,520	251,377	+27.90%
165	Windsor, ON CMA	319,246	307,877	+3.69%
166	South Bend-Mishawaka, IN-MI MSA	319,224	316,663	+0.81%
167	Kingsport-Bristol-Bristol, TN-VA MSA	309,544	298,484	+3.71%
168	Roanoke, VA MSA	308,707	288,309	+7.08%
169	Green Bay, WI MSA	306,241	282,599	+8.37%
170	Charleston, WV MSA	304,284	309,635	−1.73%
171	Lincoln, NE MSA	302,157	266,787	+13.26%
172	Fort Collins-Loveland, CO MSA	299,630	251,494	+19.14%
173	Utica-Rome, NY MSA	299,397	299,896	−0.17%
174	Fort Smith, AR-OK MSA	298,592	273,170	+9.31%
175	Columbus, GA-AL MSA	294,865	281,768	+4.65%
176	Boulder, CO MSA	294,567	269,814	+9.17%
177	Huntington-Ashland, WV-KY-OH MSA	287,702	288,649	−0.33%
178	Lubbock, TX MSA	284,890	249,700	+14.09%
179	Spartanburg, SC MSA	284,307	253,791	+12.02%
180	Erie, PA MSA	280,566	280,843	−0.10%
181	Duluth, MN-WI MSA	279,771	275,486	+1.56%
182	Atlantic City-Hammonton, NJ MSA	274,549	252,552	+8.71%
183	Norwich-New London, CT MSA	274,055	259,088	+5.78%
184	Clarksville, TN-KY MSA	273,949	232,000	+18.08%
185	Lafayette, LA MSA	273,738	239,086	+14.49%
186	San Luis Obispo-Paso Robles, CA MSA	269,637	246,681	+9.31%
187	Myrtle Beach-North Myrtle Beach-Conway, SC MSA	269,291	196,629	+36.95%
188	Hagerstown-Martinsburg, MD-WV MSA	269,140	222,771	+20.81%
189	Gainesville, FL MSA	264,275	232,392	+13.72%
190	Holland-Grand Haven, MI MSA	263,801	238,314	+10.69%
191	Santa Cruz-Watsonville, CA MSA	262,382	255,602	+2.65%
192	Saskatoon, SK CMA	260,600	225,927	+15.35%
193	Cedar Rapids, IA MSA	257,940	237,230	+8.73%
194	Merced, CA MSA	255,793	210,554	+21.49%
195	Kennewick-Pasco-Richland, WA MSA	253,340	191,822	+32.07%
196	Greeley, CO MSA	252,825	180,926	+39.74%
197	Lynchburg, VA MSA	252,634	228,616	+10.51%
198	Olympia, WA MSA	252,264	207,355	+21.66%
199	Binghamton, NY MSA	251,725	252,320	−0.24%
200	Bremerton-Silverdale, WA MSA	251,133	231,969	+8.26%
201	Laredo, TX MSA	250,304	193,117	+29.61%
202	Amarillo, TX MSA	249,881	226,522	+10.31%
203	Gulfport-Biloxi, MS MSA	248,820	246,190	+1.07%
204	Yakima, WA MSA	243,231	222,581	+9.28%
205	Waco, TX MSA	234,906	213,517	+10.02%
206	Topeka, KS MSA	233,870	224,551	+4.15%
207	Macon, GA MSA	232,293	222,368	+4.46%
208	Champaign-Urbana, IL MSA	231,891	210,275	+10.28%
209	College Station-Bryan, TX MSA	228,660	184,885	+23.68%
210	Sioux Falls, SD MSA	228,261	187,093	+22.00%
211	Appleton, Wisconsin metropolitan area	225,666	201,602	+11.94%
212	Chico, CA MSA	220,000	203,171	+8.28%
213	Tuscaloosa, AL MSA	219,461	192,034	+14.28%
214	Barnstable Town, MA MSA	215,888	222,230	−2.85%
215	Longview, TX MSA	214,369	194,042	+10.48%
216	Burlington-South Burlington, VT MSA	211,261	198,889	+6.22%
217	Prescott, AZ MSA	211,033	167,517	+25.98%
218	Regina, SK CMA	210,556	192,800	+9.21%
219	Springfield, IL MSA	210,170	201,437	+4.34%
220	Tyler, TX MSA	209,714	174,706	+20.04%
221	Las Cruces, NM MSA	209,223	174,682	+19.77%
222	Fargo, ND-MN MSA	208,777	174,367	+19.73%
223	Houma-Bayou Cane-Thibodaux, LA MSA	208,178	194,477	+7.05%
224	Florence, SC MSA	205,566	193,155	+6.43%
225	Medford, OR MSA	203,206	181,269	+12.10%
226	Sherbrooke, QC CMA	201,890	175,950	+14.74%
227	Lafayette, IN MSA	201,789	178,541	+13.02%
228	Charlottesville, VA MSA	201,559	174,021	+15.82%
229	Bellingham, WA MSA	201,140	166,814	+20.58%
230	Lake Havasu City-Kingman, AZ MSA	200,186	155,032	+29.13%
231	Saginaw-Saginaw Township North, MI MSA	200,169	210,039	−4.70%
232	Lake Charles, LA MSA	199,607	193,568	+3.12%
233	Johnson City, TN MSA	198,716	181,607	+9.42%
234	Elkhart-Goshen, IN MSA	197,559	182,791	+8.08%
235	St. John's, NL CMA	196,966	172,918	+13.91%
236	Yuma, AZ MSA	195,751	160,026	+22.32%
237	Racine, WI MSA	195,408	188,831	+3.48%
238	Bloomington, IN MSA	192,714	175,506	+9.80%
239	Athens-Clarke County, GA MSA	192,541	166,079	+15.93%
240	Greenville, NC MSA	189,510	152,772	+24.05%
241	St. Cloud, MN MSA	189,093	167,392	+12.96%
242	Anderson, SC MSA	187,126	165,740	+12.90%
243	Barrie, ON CMA	187,013	148,480	+25.95%
244	Rochester, MN MSA	186,011	163,618	+13.69%
245	Kingston, NY MSA	182,493	177,749	+2.67%
246	Crestview-Fort Walton Beach-Destin, FL MSA	180,822	170,498	+6.06%
247	Kelowna, BC CMA	179,839	147,739	+21.73%
248	Gainesville, GA MSA	179,684	139,277	+29.01%
249	Jacksonville, NC MSA	177,772	150,355	+18.23%
250	Redding, CA MSA	177,223	163,256	+8.56%
251	Monroe, LA MSA	176,441	170,053	+3.76%
252	Joplin, MO MSA	175,518	157,322	+11.57%
253	El Centro, CA MSA	174,528	142,361	+22.60%
254	Columbia, MO MSA	172,786	145,666	+18.62%
255	Terre Haute, IN MSA	172,425	170,943	+0.87%
256	Muskegon-Norton Shores, MI MSA	172,188	170,200	+1.17%
257	Abbotsford-Mission, BC CMA	170,191	147,370	+15.49%
258	Bloomington-Normal, IL MSA	169,572	150,433	+12.72%
259	Panama City-Lynn Haven-Panama City Beach, FL MSA	168,852	148,217	+13.92%
260	Waterloo-Cedar Falls, IA MSA	167,819	163,706	+2.51%
261	Oshkosh-Neenah, WI MSA	166,994	156,763	+6.53%
262	Yuba City, CA MSA	166,892	139,149	+19.94%
263	Abilene, TX MSA	165,252	160,245	+3.12%
264	Blacksburg-Christiansburg, VA MSA	162,958	151,272	+7.73%
265	Dover, DE MSA	162,310	126,697	+28.11%
266	Pascagoula, MS MSA	162,246	150,564	+7.76%
267	Parkersburg-Marietta-Vienna, WV-OH MSA	162,056	164,624	−1.56%
268	Eau Claire, WI MSA	161,151	148,337	+8.64%
269	Greater Sudbury, ON CMA	160,770	155,601	+3.32%
270	Janesville, WI MSA	160,331	152,307	+5.27%
271	Jackson, MI MSA	160,248	158,422	+1.15%
272	Punta Gorda, FL MSA	159,978	141,627	+12.96%
273	Kingston, ON CMA	159,561	146,838	+8.66%
274	Pueblo, CO MSA	159,063	141,472	+12.43%
275	Billings, MT MSA	158,050	138,904	+13.78%
276	Saguenay, QC CMA	157,790	154,938	+1.84%
277	Bend, OR MSA	157,733	115,367	+36.72%
278	Albany, GA MSA	157,308	157,833	−0.33%
279	Vineland-Millville-Bridgeton, NJ MSA	156,898	146,438	+7.14%
280	Niles-Benton Harbor, MI MSA	156,813	162,453	−3.47%
281	State College, PA MSA	153,990	135,758	+13.43%
282	Bangor, ME MSA	153,923	144,919	+6.21%
283	Alexandria, LA MSA	153,922	145,035	+6.13%
284	Decatur, AL MSA	153,829	145,867	+5.46%
285	Hanford-Corcoran, CA MSA	152,982	129,461	+18.17%
286	Iowa City, IA MSA	152,586	131,676	+15.88%
287	Rocky Mount, NC MSA	152,392	143,026	+6.55%
288	Monroe, MI MSA	152,021	145,945	+4.16%
289	Trois-Rivières, QC CMA	151,773	137,507	+10.37%
290	Wichita Falls, TX MSA	151,306	151,524	−0.14%
291	Burlington, NC MSA	151,131	130,800	+15.54%
292	Madera-Chowchilla, CA MSA	150,865	123,109	+22.55%
293	Jefferson City, MO MSA	149,807	140,052	+6.97%
294	Wheeling, WV-OH MSA	147,950	153,172	−3.41%
295	Florence-Muscle Shoals, AL MSA	147,137	142,950	+2.93%
296	Grand Junction, CO MSA	146,723	116,255	+26.21%
297	Dothan, AL MSA	145,639	130,861	+11.29%
298	Santa Fe, NM MSA	144,170	129,292	+11.51%
299	Johnstown, PA MSA	143,679	152,598	−5.84%
300	Sioux City, IA-NE-SD MSA	143,577	143,053	+0.37%
301	Hattiesburg, MS MSA	142,842	123,812	+15.37%
302	Dalton, GA MSA	142,227	120,031	+18.49%
303	Guelph, ON CMA	141,097	117,344	+20.24%
304	Auburn-Opelika, AL MSA	140,247	115,092	+21.86%
305	Warner Robins, GA MSA	139,900	110,765	+26.30%
306	Valdosta, GA MSA	139,588	119,560	+16.75%
307	Moncton, NB CMA	138,644	117,727	+17.77%
308	Coeur d'Alene, ID MSA	138,494	108,685	+27.43%
309	Springfield, OH MSA	138,333	144,742	−4.43%
310	St. George, UT MSA	138,115	90,354	+52.86%
311	Sebastian-Vero Beach, FL MSA	138,028	112,947	+22.21%
312	Odessa, TX MSA	137,130	121,123	+13.22%
313	Midland, TX MSA	136,872	116,009	+17.98%
314	Morristown, TN MSA	136,608	123,081	+10.99%
315	Napa, CA MSA	136,484	124,279	+9.82%
316	Battle Creek, MI MSA	136,146	137,985	−1.33%
317	Texarkana, TX-Texarkana, AR MSA	136,027	129,749	+4.84%
318	Brantford, ON CMA	135,501	118,086	+14.75%
319	Flagstaff, AZ MSA	134,421	116,320	+15.56%
320	Wausau, WI MSA	134,063	125,834	+6.54%
321	La Crosse, WI-MN MSA	133,665	126,838	+5.38%
322	Lebanon, PA MSA	133,568	120,327	+11.00%
323	Anderson, IN MSA	131,636	133,358	−1.29%
324	Pittsfield, MA MSA	131,219	134,953	−2.77%
325	Idaho Falls, ID MSA	130,374	101,677	+28.22%
326	Farmington, NM MSA	130,044	113,801	+14.27%
327	Morgantown, WV MSA	129,709	111,200	+16.64%
328	Glens Falls, NY MSA	128,923	124,345	+3.68%
329	Winchester, VA-WV MSA	128,472	102,997	+24.73%
330	Saint John, NB CMA	127,761	122,678	+4.14%
331	St. Joseph, MO-KS MSA	127,329	122,336	+4.08%
332	Altoona, PA MSA	127,089	129,144	−1.59%
333	Manhattan, KS MSA	127,081	108,999	+16.59%
334	Rapid City, SD MSA	126,382	112,818	+12.02%
335	Bowling Green, KY MSA	125,953	104,166	+20.92%
336	Logan, UT-ID MSA	125,442	102,720	+22.12%
337	Harrisonburg, VA MSA	125,228	108,193	+15.75%
338	Salisbury, MD MSA	125,203	109,391	+14.45%
339	Mansfield, OH MSA	124,475	128,852	−3.40%
340	Steubenville-Weirton, OH-WV MSA	124,454	132,008	−5.72%
341	Lawton, OK MSA	124,098	114,996	+7.92%
342	Goldsboro, NC MSA	122,623	113,329	+8.20%
343	Thunder Bay, ON CMA	121,596	121,986	−0.32%
344	Jonesboro, AR MSA	121,026	107,762	+12.31%
345	Sherman-Denison, TX MSA	120,877	110,595	+9.30%
346	Elizabethtown, KY MSA	119,736	107,547	+11.33%
347	Peterborough, ON CMA	118,975	102,423	+16.16%
348	Anniston-Oxford, AL MSA	118,572	112,249	+5.63%
349	Muncie, IN MSA	117,671	118,769	−0.92%
350	Mount Vernon-Anacortes, WA MSA	116,901	102,979	+13.52%
351	Williamsport, PA MSA	116,111	120,044	−3.28%
352	Cleveland, TN MSA	115,788	104,015	+11.32%
353	Sheboygan, WI MSA	115,507	112,646	+2.54%
354	Jackson, TN MSA	115,425	107,377	+7.50%
355	Victoria, TX MSA	115,384	111,663	+3.33%
356	Owensboro, KY MSA	114,752	109,875	+4.44%
357	Kankakee-Bradley, IL MSA	113,449	103,833	+9.26%
358	Brunswick, GA MSA	112,370	93,044	+20.77%
359	San Angelo, TX MSA	111,823	105,781	+5.71%
360	Michigan City-La Porte, IN MSA	111,467	110,106	+1.24%
361	Wenatchee-East Wenatchee, WA MSA	110,884	99,219	+11.76%
362	Lawrence, KS MSA	110,826	99,962	+10.87%
363	Decatur, IL MSA	110,768	114,706	−3.43%
364	Missoula, MT MSA	109,299	95,802	+14.09%
365	Bismarck, ND MSA	108,779	94,719	+14.84%
366	Bay City, MI MSA	107,771	110,157	−2.17%
367	Lewiston-Auburn, ME MSA	107,702	103,793	+3.77%
368	Sumter, SC MSA	107,456	104,646	+2.69%
369	Danville, VA MSA	106,561	110,156	−3.26%
370	Lima, OH MSA	106,331	108,473	−1.97%
371	Gadsden, AL MSA	104,430	103,459	+0.94%
372	Cumberland, MD-WV MSA	103,299	102,008	+1.27%
373	Longview, WA MSA	102,410	92,948	+10.18%
374	Fond du Lac, WI MSA	101,633	97,296	+4.46%
375	Ithaca, NY MSA	101,564	96,501	+5.25%
376	Pine Bluff, AR MSA	100,258	107,341	−6.60%
377	Kokomo, IN MSA	98,688	101,541	−2.81%
378	Grand Forks, ND-MN MSA	98,461	97,478	+1.01%
379	Fairbanks, AK MSA	97,581	82,840	+17.79%
380	Ocean City, NJ MSA	97,265	102,326	−4.95%
381	Mankato-North Mankato, MN MSA	96,740	85,712	+12.87%
382	Rome, GA MSA	96,317	90,565	+6.35%
383	Cape Girardeau-Jackson, MO-IL MSA	96,275	90,312	+6.60%
384	Hot Springs, AR MSA	96,024	88,068	+9.03%
385	Palm Coast, FL MSA	95,696	49,832	+92.04%
386	Dubuque, IA MSA	93,653	89,143	+5.06%
387	Cheyenne, WY MSA	91,738	81,607	+12.41%
388	Pocatello, ID MSA	90,656	83,103	+9.09%
389	Ames, IA MSA	89,542	79,981	+11.95%
390	Elmira, NY MSA	88,830	91,070	−2.46%
391	Corvallis, OR MSA	85,579	78,153	+9.50%
392	Danville, IL MSA	81,625	83,919	−2.73%
393	Great Falls, MT MSA	81,327	80,357	+1.21%
394	Hinesville-Fort Stewart, GA MSA	77,917	71,914	+8.35%
395	Sandusky, OH MSA	77,079	79,551	−3.11%
396	Columbus, IN MSA	76,794	71,435	+7.50%
397	Casper, WY MSA	75,450	66,533	+13.40%
398	Lewiston, ID-WA MSA	60,888	57,961	+5.05%
399	Carson City, NV MSA	55,274	52,457	+5.37%

== See also ==
- List of North American metropolitan areas by population
