= List of cities in Oceania by population =

This is a list of cities in Oceania (including Australia and Western New Guinea) with a population of over 80,000. National and territorial capitals are shown in bold type. Capitals of Australian states and territories are shown in italics.

City	Country	Urban area	Notes	Image
Melbourne	Australia	5,328,274	Significant Urban Area, June 2025	
Sydney	Australia	5,219,675	Significant Urban Area, June 2025	
Brisbane	Australia	2,745,086	Significant Urban Area, June 2025	
Perth	Australia	2,430,757	Significant Urban Area, June 2025	
Auckland	New Zealand	1,547,200	Urban area provisional resident population, June 2025	
Adelaide	Australia	1,470,938	Significant Urban Area, June 2025	
Honolulu	United States (Hawaii)	853,252	Urban Area. National census, April 2020	
Gold Coast-Tweed Heads	Australia	761,634	Significant Urban Area, June 2025	
**Port Moresby**	Papua New Guinea	756,754	National census, June 2024	
Newcastle–Maitland	Australia	541,634	Significant Urban Area, June 2025	
**Canberra**–Queanbeyan	Australia	521,049	Significant Urban Area, June 2025	
Sunshine Coast	Australia	424,741	Significant Urban Area, June 2025	
Christchurch	New Zealand	407,800	Urban area provisional resident population, June 2025	
Jayapura	Indonesia	398,478	National census, 2020	
Central Coast	Australia	354,189	Significant Urban Area, June 2025	
Wollongong	Australia	322,343	Significant Urban Area, June 2025	
Geelong	Australia	314,481	Significant Urban Area, June 2025	
Sorong	Indonesia	284,410	National census, 2020	
Hobart	Australia	233,736	Significant Urban Area, June 2025	
**Wellington**	New Zealand	209,800	Urban area provisional resident population, June 2025	
Lae	Papua New Guinea	203,056	National census, 2024	
Hamilton	New Zealand	192,100	Urban area provisional New Zealand resident population, June 2025	
Townsville	Australia	190,551	Significant Urban Area, June 2025	
**Suva-**Nasinu	Fiji	185,920	Urban Area. National census, December 2017	
Cairns	Australia	164,149	Significant Urban Area, June 2025	
Tauranga	New Zealand	160,900	Urban area provisional New Zealand resident population, June 2025	
Toowoomba	Australia	153,781	Significant Urban Area, June 2025	
Darwin	Australia	145,019	Significant Urban Area, June 2025	
**Honiara**	Solomon Islands	129,569	National census, October 2019	
**Papeʻete**	French Polynesia (France)	124,274	Urban area. (Note: The urban area of Pape'ete includes Faʼaʼā, Punaʻauiʻa, Pīraʻe, Ārue & Māhina) National census, December 2022	
Ballarat	Australia	120,939	Significant Urban Area, June 2025	
Kailua-Kāneʻohe	United States (Hawaii)	118,092	Urban Area. National census, April 2020	
Lower Hutt	New Zealand	113,200	Urban area provisional New Zealand resident population, June 2025	
Bendigo	Australia	106,493	Significant Urban Area, June 2025	
Dunedin	New Zealand	104,000	Urban area provisional New Zealand resident population, June 2025	
Albury–Wodonga	Australia	102,435	Significant Urban Area, June 2025	
Launceston	Australia	92,993	Significant Urban Area, June 2025	
Mackay	Australia	89,761	Significant Urban Area, June 2025	
**Nouméa**	New Caledonia (France)	85,976	National census, April 2025	
Bunbury	Australia	84,332	Significant Urban Area, June 2025	
Rockhampton	Australia	83,508	Significant Urban Area, June 2025	
Palmerston North	New Zealand	81,200	Urban area provisional New Zealand resident population, June 2025	

== See also ==
- Lists of cities in Oceania
- List of metropolitan areas in Oceania by population
