= List of largest cities in the Americas =

This is a list of the 50 largest cities in the Americas by population residing within city limits based on the most recent official census results, estimates, or short-term projections available for all of these cities, which refer to mid-2020 populations. These figures do not reflect the population of the urban agglomeration or metropolitan area which typically do not coincide with the administrative boundaries of the city. These figures refer to mid-2020 populations with the following exceptions:

1. Mexican cities, whose figures derive from the 2015 Intercensal Survey conducted by INEGI with a reference date of March 15, 2020;
2. Chilean cities, whose figures derive from the 2017 Census projection by Instituto Nacional de Estadísticas;
3. Venezuelan cities, whose figures originate from the 2015 estimate given by the Instituto Nacional de Estadística, with a reference date of 2016.

	City	Image	Country	Population	Year
1	São Paulo		Brazil	11,904,961	2025
2	Lima		Peru	10,092,000 (Note: While there is no official administrative definition of the city, it is generally considered to consist of the central 30 of the 43 districts of Lima Province, corresponding to the urban area centered around the historic Cercado de Lima district.)	2023
3	Mexico City		Mexico	9,209,944 (Note: Population estimate is that of the federal entity known since 2016 as Ciudad de México and previously as the Distrito Federal.)	2021
4	New York City		United States	8,478,072	2024
5	Bogotá		Colombia	7,862,277 (Note: Population projections for Colombian cities are that of the cabecera municipal (municipal seat).)	2024
6	Rio de Janeiro		Brazil	6,729,894	2024
7	Santiago		Chile	7,400,741	2024
8	Los Angeles		United States	3,878,704	2024
9	Caracas		Venezuela	3,289,886 (Note: Population projection is that of the Metropolitan District of Caracas, which comprises the municipalities of Libertador, Chacao, Baruta, Sucre and El Hatillo.)	2015
10	Buenos Aires		Argentina	3,121,707	2022
11	Toronto		Canada	3,025,657	2021
12	Brasília		Brazil	2,982,818	2024
13	Chicago		United States	2,721,308	2024
14	Medellín		Colombia	2,657,772	2024
15	Guayaquil		Ecuador	2,650,288	2022
16	Fortaleza		Brazil	2,574,412	2024
17	Salvador		Brazil	2,568,928	2024
18	Belo Horizonte		Brazil	2,416,339	2024
19	Houston		United States	2,390,125	2024
20	Manaus		Brazil	2,279,686	2024
21	Cali		Colombia	2,270,293	2024
22	Havana		Cuba	2,137,847	2022
23	Curitiba		Brazil	1,829,225	2024
24	Tijuana		Mexico	1,810,645 (Note: Population estimate is that of the cabecera municipal (municipal seat).)	2020 (Note: Population estimate has a reference date of 2023.)
25	Montreal		Canada	1,791,512	2022
26	Quito		Ecuador	1,763,275	2022
27	Maracaibo		Venezuela	1,653,211	2015
28	Phoenix		United States	1,673,164	2024
29	Ecatepec de Morelos		Mexico	1,643,623 (Note: Population estimate is that of the entire municipio.)	2020
30	Santa Cruz de la Sierra		Bolivia	1,606,671	2024
31	Recife		Brazil	1,587,707	2024
32	León		Mexico	1,579,803	2020
33	Philadelphia		United States	1,573,916	2024
34	Puebla		Mexico	1,542,232	2020
35	Córdoba		Argentina	1,505,250	2022
36	Juárez		Mexico	1,501,551	2020
37	Goiânia		Brazil	1,494,599	2024
38	Porto Alegre		Brazil	1,476,867	2024
39	Zapopan		Mexico	1,476,491	2020
40	San Antonio		United States	1,472,909	2022
41	Calgary		Canada	1,413,800	2022
42	Belém		Brazil	1,398,531	2024
43	Guadalajara		Mexico	1,385,621	2020
44	San Diego		United States	1,381,162	2022
45	Rosario		Argentina	1,348,725	2022
46	Guarulhos		Brazil	1,345,364	2024
47	Barranquilla		Colombia	1,341,160	2024
48	Dallas		United States	1,326,087	2024
49	Montevideo		Uruguay	1,302,954	2023
50	Guatemala City		Guatemala	1,221,739	2023
