= List of metropolitan areas in Asia =

Asia is one of the world's fastest-growing continents, with increasing urbanisation and a high growth rate for cities. Jakarta, in Indonesia, is the world's largest metropolitan area by population.

The populations of the given cities are obtained from five sources:

- Cities
- World Atlas
- National Official Estimate (NOE)

Out of these five sources, the highest estimate is shown in bold. The cities are ranked on the basis of their highest estimate of population. Some remarks:

- The official statistics for Chinese cities are for municipalities which usually extend well beyond the urban areas and comprise a substantial rural population. When such statistics exceed the estimated figures, as in the case for Chongqing, Wuhan and Shenyang, they are not taken into account.
- The figure for Shanghai from City Population includes the city of Suzhou (some 100 km or 62 miles northwest of Shanghai), which is not included in other estimates or in the official statistics and therefore is not taken into account.
- The figure for Guangzhou from City Population is for the urban population of the Guangdong province, also which includes the cities Shenzhen, Dongguan, Zhongshan, Jiangmen and Huizhou. The area has not yet been developed into a single metropolitan area and therefore this figure is not taken into account. Shenzhen and Dongguan are listed separately in this table.
- Demographia and world Atlas give figures for the contiguous cities of Quanzhou, Jinjiang and Shishi. City Population includes these three cities in its figures for Xiamen (population 4-4.8 million), giving a total population of 10,000,000. However, Xiamen is not actually contiguous with the three other cities and this statistic is not taken into account.
- The figure for Delhi from City Population includes the cities of Faridabad, Ghaziabad, Gurgaon, which are not included in other estimates or in the official statistics and therefore is not taken into account.
- The figure for Mumbai from City Population includes the cities of Bhiwandi, Kalyan, Thane, Ulhasnagar, Vasai-Virar which are not included in other estimates or in the official statistics and therefore is not taken into account.

The table is color-coded to show which region of Asia each city is in. The color-code key is as follows:

East Asia
South Asia
Southeast Asia
West Asia

With twenty cities, East Asia accounts for half of cities under this list, with China having the most with fifteen cities, South Asia comes second with ten cities, seven of which are in India. Southeast Asia accounts for seven cities and West Asia with just four cities.

== List ==
Area	Image	Country	Metro Population (2025 est.)	Demographia (2017 est.)	UN WC (2016 est.)	World Atlas (2017 est.)	Official or Other	Est. Year
Guangzhou		China	**73,600,000**	19,075,000	Guangzhou 13,070,000; Foshan 7,089,000	20,597,000	12,700,800	–
Jakarta		Indonesia	29,800,000	35,386,000	32,594,159	30,539,000	**54,842,885**	2023
Mumbai		India	28,100,000	23,355,000	21,357,000	17,712,000	**47,800,000**	2001
Delhi		India	36,900,000	29,617,000	26,454,000	24,998,000	**41,034,555**	2011
Tokyo		Japan	**41,300,000**	37,977,000	38,140,000	37,843,000	31,714,000	2005
Shanghai		China	**42,300,000**	23,390,000	24,484,000	23,416,000	23,019,148	2010
Chongqing		China	13,200,000	7,990,000	13,744,000	7,217,000	**28,846,170**	2010
Manila		Philippines	**27,100,000**	24,245,000	13,131,000	24,123,000	14,001,751	2024
Seoul		South Korea	25,400,000	21,794,000	Seoul 9,979,000; Incheon 2,711,000	23,480,000	**26,015,868**	2007
Dhaka		Bangladesh	**23,700,000**	16,820,000	18,237,000	15,669,000	12,797,394	2008
Bangkok		Thailand	**22,400,000**	15,645,000	9,440,000	14,998,000	8,249,117	2010
Beijing		China	21,800,000	20,415,000	**21,240,000**	21,009,000	19,612,368	2010
Osaka-Kobe-Kyoto (Keihanshin)		Japan	17,700,000	17,075,000	**20,337,000**	17,440,000	16,663,000	2005
Surabaya		Indonesia	6,000,000	6,556,000	9,958,656	6,251,766	**19,659,028**	2023
Kolkata		India	18,100,000	**18,560,853**	**18,560,853**	**18,560,853**	–	–
Chengdu		China	**18,300,000**	11,050,000	7,820,000	10,376,000	–	–
Tehran		Iran	**17,200,000**	13,805,000	8,516,000	13,532,000	13,422,366	2006
Istanbul		Turkey	**16,200,000**	15,154,000	14,365,000	14,163,989	15,519,267	2019
Bangalore		India	**15,300,000**	10,535,000	10,456,000	8,728,906	8,499,399	2011
Ho Chi Minh City		Vietnam	**14,700,000**	10,380,000	7,498,000	8,957,000	7,955,000	2016
Hangzhou		China	**14,700,000**	6,820,000	–	7,275,000	–	–
Chennai		India	**13,300,000**	12,395,000	10,163,000	9,714,000	8,696,010	2022
Tianjin		China	11,800,000	**13,245,000**	11,558,000	10,920,000	12,938,224	–
Wuhan		China	**12,900,000**	7,895,000	7,979,000	7,509,000	9,785,392	–
Shenzhen		China	included in Guangzhou	**12,775,000**	10,828,000	12,084,000	10,357,938	–
Hyderabad		India	**12,100,000**	9,305,000	9,218,000	8,754,000	–	–
Nagoya		Japan	**10,500,000**	10,070,000	9,434,000	10,177,000	9,046,000	2005
Zhengzhou-Xingyang		China	**10,500,000**	7,005,000	4,539,000	4,942,000	–	–
Taipei		Taiwan	**10,200,000**	8,550,000	2,669,000	7,438,000	8,916,653	2010
Ahmedabad		India	**10,200,000**	7,645,000	7,571,000	7,186,000	–	–
Kuala Lumpur		Malaysia	**9,750,000**	7,590,000	7,047,000	7,088,000	1,768.00	2015
Nanjing		China	**9,750,000**	6,320,000	–	6,155,000	–	–
Bandung		Indonesia	7,050,000	7,203,000	–	6,251,766	**9,054,175**	2023
Shenyang		China	**8,950,000**	7,935,000	6,438,000	6,078,000	8,106,171	–
Dongguan		China	Included in Guangzhou	8,310,000	7,469,000	**8,442,000**	–	–
Singapore		Singapore	**8,150,000**	5,825,000	5,717,000	5,624,000	5,607,300	2017
Baghdad		Iraq	**8,000,000**	6,960,000	6,811,000	6,625,000	–	–
Riyadh		Saudi Arabia	**7,900,000**	6,030,000	6,540,000	5,666,000	6,506,000	2014
Hanoi		Vietnam	7,550,000	**7,785,000**	3,790,000	3,715,000	–	–
Hong Kong		Hong Kong	**7,500,000**	7,330,000	–	7,246,000	7,246,000	–
Quanzhou-Shishi-Jinjiang		China	Included in Xiamen	6,480,000	1,469,000	**6,710,000**	–	–
