= Urban agglomerations in Asia =

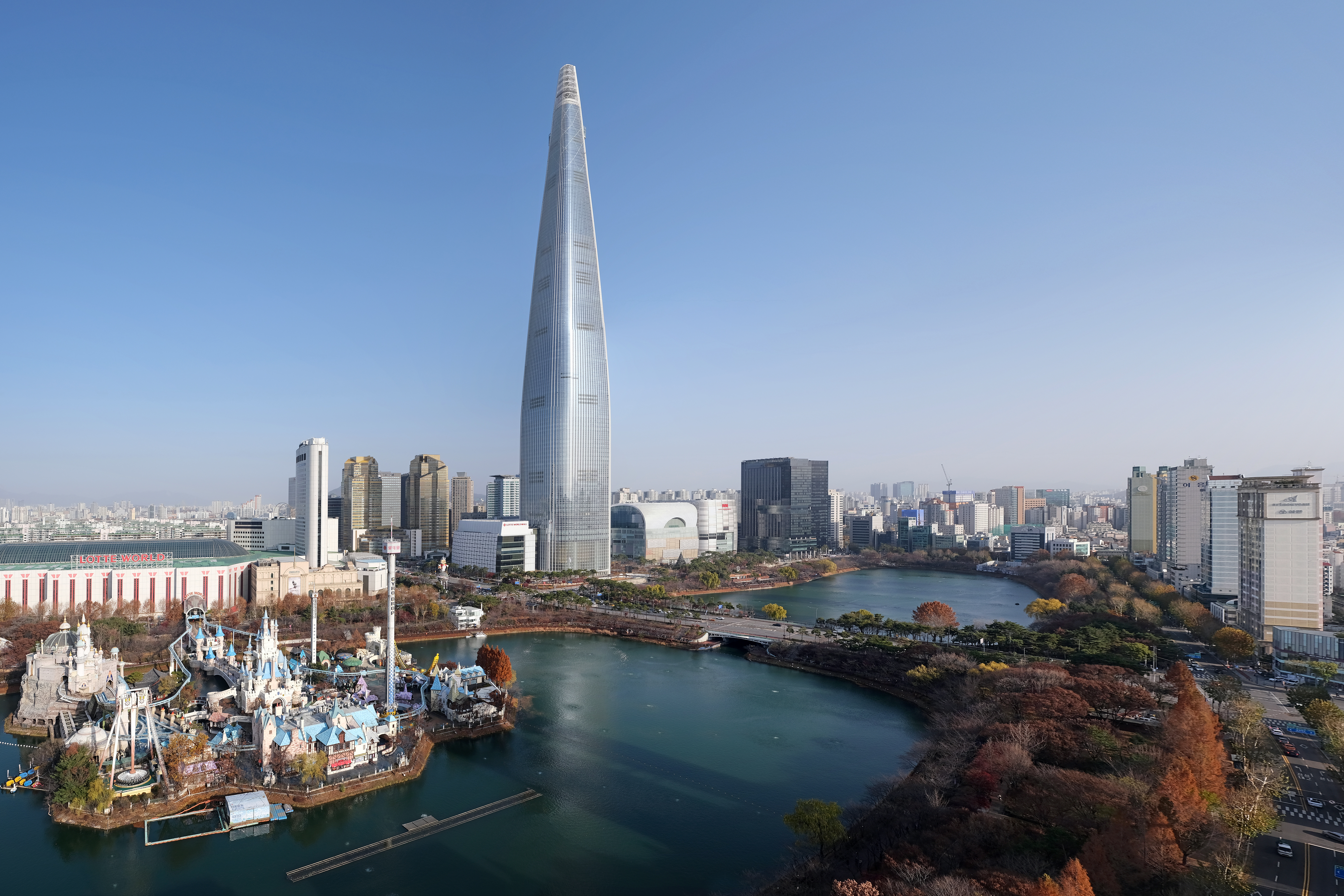
Seoul

This is a list of urban agglomerations in Asia by population. An urban area (built-up urban area or urban agglomeration) is fundamentally different from a metropolitan area. A metropolitan area is a labor market (and a housing market). It includes a principal built-up urban area (the largest built-up urban area in the metropolitan area) as well as economically connected rural areas (and smaller urban areas) to the outside.

| Asia Rank | World Rank | Urban Area | Country | Population | Area (km^{2}) | Density (people/km^{2}) |
|---|---|---|---|---|---|---|
| 1 | 1 | Tokyo | Japan | 37,977,000 | 8,230 | 4,614 |
| 2 | 2 | Jakarta | Indonesia | 34,540,000 | 3,540 | 9,758 |
| 3 | 3 | Delhi | India | 29,617,000 | 2,232 | 13,269 |
| 4 | 4 | Manila | Philippines | 28,250,517 | 8,100 | 3,488 |
| 5 | 5 | Mumbai | India | 23,355,000 | 944 | 24,740 |
| 6 | 6 | Shanghai | China | 22,120,000 | 4,068 | 5,437 |
| 7 | 8 | Seoul | South Korea | 21,794,000 | 2,768 | 7,873 |
| 8 | 10 | Guangzhou-Foshan | China | 20,902,000 | 4,342 | 4,814 |
| 9 | 12 | Beijing | China | 19,433,000 | 4,172 | 4,658 |
| 10 | 14 | Kolkata | India | 17,560,000 | 1,351 | 12,994 |
| 11 | 16 | Bangkok | Thailand | 17,066,000 | 3,199 | 5,336 |
| 12 | 18 | Shenzhen | China | 15,929,000 | 1,803 | 8,836 |
| 13 | 19 | Dhaka | Bangladesh | 15,443,000 | 456 | 33,852 |
| 14 | 23 | Osaka-Kobe-Kyoto | Japan | 14,977,000 | 3,019 | 4,961 |
| 15 | 24 | Karachi | Pakistan | 14,835,000 | 1,044 | 14,210 |
| 16 | 25 | Bengaluru | India | 13,707,000 | 1,205 | 11,378 |
| 17 | 26 | Tehran | Iran | 13,633,000 | 1,704 | 8,002 |
| 18 | 28 | Ho Chi Minh City | Vietnam | 13,312,000 | 1,638 | 8,127 |
| 19 | 29 | Chennai | India | 11,324,000 | 1,049 | 10,800 |
| 20 | 30 | Chengdu | China | 11,309,000 | 1,828 | 6,188 |
| 21 | 32 | Lahore | Pakistan | 11,021,000 | 853 | 12,916 |
| 22 | 35 | Tianjin | China | 10,800,000 | 2,813 | 3,839 |
| 23 | 37 | Hyderabad | India | 9,746,000 | 1,273 | 7,654 |
| 24 | 40 | Nagoya | Japan | 9,113,000 | 3,704 | 2,460 |
| 25 | 42 | Wuhan | China | 8,962,000 | 1,646 | 5,444 |
| 26 | 43 | Taipei | Taiwan | 8,918,000 | 1,076 | 8,289 |
| 27 | 45 | Kuala Lumpur | Malaysia | 8,285,000 | 2,162 | 3,833 |
| 28 | 46 | Dongguan | China | 7,981,000 | 1,755 | 4,546 |
| 29 | 47 | Pune | India | 7,764,000 | 649 | 11,956 |
| 30 | 48 | Chongqing | China | 7,739,000 | 1,537 | 5,036 |
| 31 | 50 | Nanjing | China | 7,496,000 | 1,613 | 4,649 |
| 32 | 51 | Ahmedabad | India | 7,410,000 | 359 | 20,622 |
| 33 | 52 | Hong Kong | Hong Kong | 7,347,000 | 291 | 25,254 |
| 34 | 55 | Shenyang-Fushun | China | 7,105,000 | 1,515 | 4,690 |
| 35 | 56 | Bandung | Indonesia | 7,065,000 | 487 | 14,510 |
| 36 | 58 | Riyadh | Saudi Arabia | 6,881,000 | 1,672 | 4,115 |
| 37 | 61 | Zhengzhou | China | 6,765,000 | 1,656 | 4,085 |
| 38 | 63 | Xi'an | China | 6,680,000 | 1,094 | 6,105 |
| 39 | 64 | Hanoi | Vietnam | 6,576,000 | 963 | 6,828 |
| 40 | 65 | Surabaya | Indonesia | 6,499,000 | 911 | 7,131 |
| 41 | 68 | Hangzhou | China | 6,446,000 | 1,446 | 4,458 |
| 42 | 63 | Quanzhou | China | 6,345,000 | 2,090 | 3,036 |
| 43 | 70 | Yangon | Myanmar | 6,314,000 | 603 | 10,474 |
| 44 | 74 | Dubai | United Arab Emirates | 6,036,000 | 1,508 | 4,004 |
| 45 | 77 | Qingdao | China | 5,911,000 | 1,656 | 3,569 |
| 46 | 78 | Surat | India | 5,807,000 | 238 | 24,378 |
| 47 | 79 | Baghdad | Iraq | 5,796,000 | 693 | 8,365 |
