= Jinhaku Sonan =

Japanese entomologist

Jinhaku Minamikawa (南川仁博, Minamikawa Jinhaku; November 1892 – 1 April 1984), professionally known as Jinhaku Sonen (楚南仁博, Sonan Jinhaku), was a Japanese entomologist based in Taiwan.

In 1908, at the age of 16, Jinhaku Sonan arrived in Taiwan where he completed his education in Creek Middle Schools evening division 1909 where he later taught. In order to showcase zoological and insect specimens, the Taiwan Governor Museum was founded in 1909, and he was hired as an insect collector by the Central Buying Agency, which was in charge of managing the museum's finances. From 1912 to 1916 he served in the Imperial Japanese Navy but returned to Taiwan. In 1947 after the Second World War he returned to Japan, working in agriculture, forestry, agriculture, the tea industry and the Japan Association of plant quarantine. In old age he settled in Tokyo, (1984). Sonan returned to Japan at 55, changed his surname from Sonen to Minamikawa, and left his entomological collection in Taiwan. He died at the age of 92 years.

His entomological research in Taiwan, concerned Lepidoptera, Ichneumonidae, and insect pests of tea and more generally, was the pioneer student of Taiwan's insect fauna.

== Works ==
Partial list from over 100

- Sonan, J. (1930) Some butterflies from Hainan Island. Transactions of the Natural History Society of Formosa, 20, 31–37. [In Japanese]
- Sonan, J. (1930) Notes on some butterflies from Formosa. Zephyrus, 2, 165–176, 1 pl. [In Japanese]
- Sonan, J. (1936) Notes on some butterflies from Formosa. Zephyrus, 6, 205–216, 3 pls. [In Japanese]
- Sonan, J. (1938) A list of the butterflies of Hainan, with descriptions of two new sub-species of Hesperiidae.Transactions of the Natural History Society of Formosa, 28, 348–372, 2f. [In Japanese]
- Sonan, J. (1938) Notes on some butterflies from Formosa (5). Zephyrus, 7, 250–275, 1 pl. [In Japanese]
- Sonan, J. & Mitono, T. (1936) On a new species of Hesperiidae, Coladenia sadakoe Sonan et Mitono. Zephyrus, 6,184–185. [In Japanese]
- Sonan, J. 1936. Six new species of Pimplinae (Hym. Ichneumonidae). Transactions of the Natural History Society of Formosa. Taihoku, 26(158): 413–119.
