= Lists of cities in Oceania =

This is a list of lists of cities in Oceania.

== Sovereign states ==
- List of cities in Australia
- List of cities, towns and villages in East Timor
- List of cities and towns in Fiji
- List of cities in Indonesia
- List of cities and villages in Kiribati
- List of cities in Papua New Guinea
- List of cities in the Marshall Islands
- List of cities in Nauru
- List of cities in New Zealand
- List of cities in Palau
- List of cities, towns and villages in Samoa
- List of cities, towns and villages in the Solomon Islands
- List of cities in Tonga
- List of villages and neighbourhoods in Tuvalu
- List of cities in Vanuatu

== Dependencies and other territories ==
- Administrative divisions of American Samoa
- List of settlements on Christmas Island
- List of settlements in the Cocos (Keeling) Islands
- List of villages and neighbourhoods in the Cook Islands
- List of cities in French Polynesia
- List of villages in Guam
- List of places in Hawaii
- List of cities in New Caledonia
- List of villages in Niue
- List of settlements in Norfolk Island
- List of villages in the Northern Mariana Islands
- List of settlements in the Pitcairn Islands
- List of villages in Tokelau
- List of cities in Wallis and Futuna

== See also ==
- Lists of cities
- Lists of cities by country
- List of cities in Oceania by population
