= Randa, Djibouti =

Randa راندا
- Town
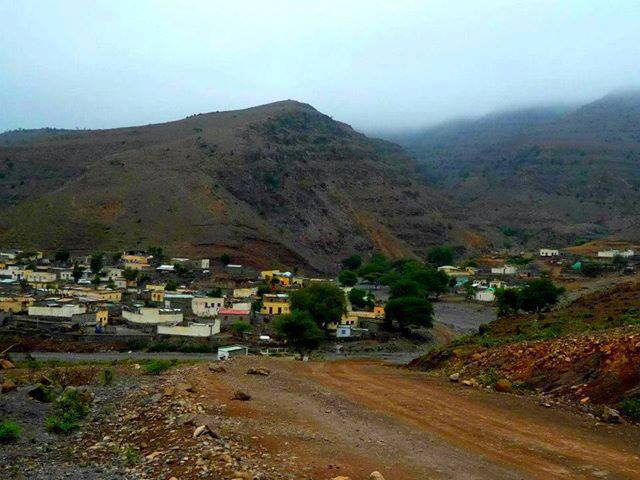
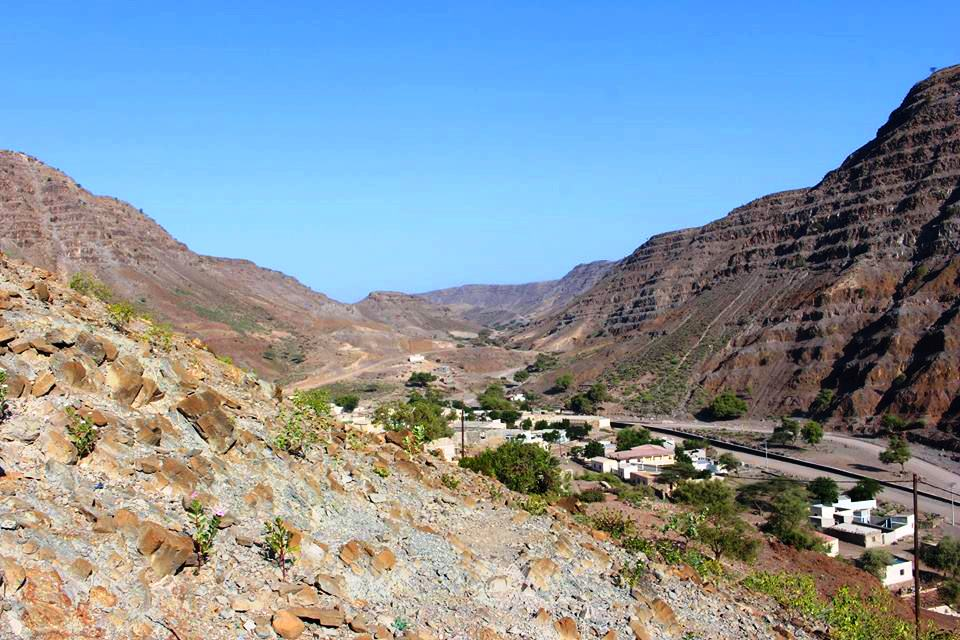

- Location in Djibouti
- Coordinates: 11°50′49″N 42°39′38″E
- Country: Djibouti
- Region: Tadjoura
- District: Randa

Area
  - Total: 0.44 km^{2} (0.17 sq mi)
- Elevation: 927 m (3,041 ft)

Population (2024 census)
  - Total: 2,055

Randa (Arabic: راندا) is a town in central Djibouti located in Tadjoura. It is the capital of the Randa District. The settlement lies in a small valley, north of the Day Forest National Park in the Goda Mountains. It is located on the RN-11 Highway, which connects it to Tadjoura, located some 32 kilometres (20 miles) to the south.

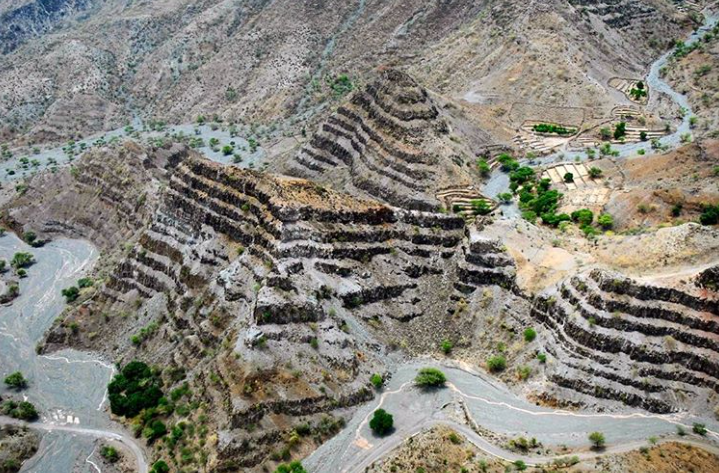
Randa Mountain Side

== History ==
Randa has played an important role in trade between the port of Tadjoura, and the hinterland, once dynamic and prosperous possessing a well on its bed of wadi which crossed it and has one of the mildest climates in Djibouti. The beginning of the civil conflict in December 1991, when the FRUD rebels captured Randa and neighbouring towns. However, the Djiboutian Army re-took the town in October 1993.

== Overview ==
The settlement lies in a small valley, north of the RN-11 road which leaves the coast to the south to head west towards Dorra. It is within 10 miles (16 km) of the Day Forest National Park in the Goda Mountains to the south.

Nearest towns
Name	Distance
Bankouale	1.8 miles (2.9 km)
Airolaf	5.3 miles (8.5 km)
Tadjoura	15.8 miles (25.4 km)
Dorra	24.3 miles (39.1 km)
`Assa Gaila	23.8 miles (38.3 km)
Medeho	26.2 miles (42.2 km)
Balho	34.6 miles (55.7 km)

== Geography ==
Randa's altitude gives the settlement and the surrounding area a milder climate than the Tadjoura coastal area, where the weather is typically hotter. A river runs through the town. Often dry, the watercourse divides Randa in half. The surrounding mountains to the west are high and jagged, lengthening journeys in that direction.

== Wildlife ==
Due to the fertility of the region, experienced in many years, wild mammals such as gazelle and mountain goats migrate to the area either to breed or to live and graze on the grassland savannah.

== Climate ==
The town seldom experiences either sweltering or cold weather, due to the high altitude. The settlement has relatively high average precipitation for the region, twice that of Tadjourah city for example. Average monthly temperatures in Randa range from 14 °C or 57.2 °F during December and January mornings to 34.7 °C or 94.5 °F during June afternoons.

Randa has a hot semi-arid climate (BSh) by the Köppen-Geiger system.

Climate data for Randa
Month	Jan	Feb	Mar	Apr	May	Jun	Jul	Aug	Sep	Oct	Nov	Dec	Year
Mean daily maximum °C (°F)	23.6 (74.5)	23.9 (75.0)	25.9 (78.6)	28.0 (82.4)	31.2 (88.2)	34.4 (93.9)	34.7 (94.5)	33.7 (92.7)	32.1 (89.8)	28.6 (83.5)	25.8 (78.4)	24.0 (75.2)	28.8 (83.9)
Daily mean °C (°F)	18.6 (65.5)	19.3 (66.7)	20.9 (69.6)	23.1 (73.6)	25.8 (78.4)	28.9 (84.0)	28.9 (84.0)	28.1 (82.6)	27.2 (81.0)	23.4 (74.1)	20.8 (69.4)	19.2 (66.6)	23.7 (74.6)
Mean daily minimum °C (°F)	13.7 (56.7)	14.8 (58.6)	16.0 (60.8)	18.2 (64.8)	20.5 (68.9)	23.5 (74.3)	23.1 (73.6)	22.5 (72.5)	22.3 (72.1)	18.2 (64.8)	15.8 (60.4)	14.4 (57.9)	18.6 (65.5)
Average precipitation mm (inches)	39 (1.5)	36 (1.4)	20 (0.8)	27 (1.1)	12 (0.5)	7 (0.3)	25 (1.0)	38 (1.5)	40 (1.6)	13 (0.5)	37 (1.5)	31 (1.2)	325 (12.9)
Source: Climate-Data.org, altitude: 1034m
