= Wildlife of Djibouti =

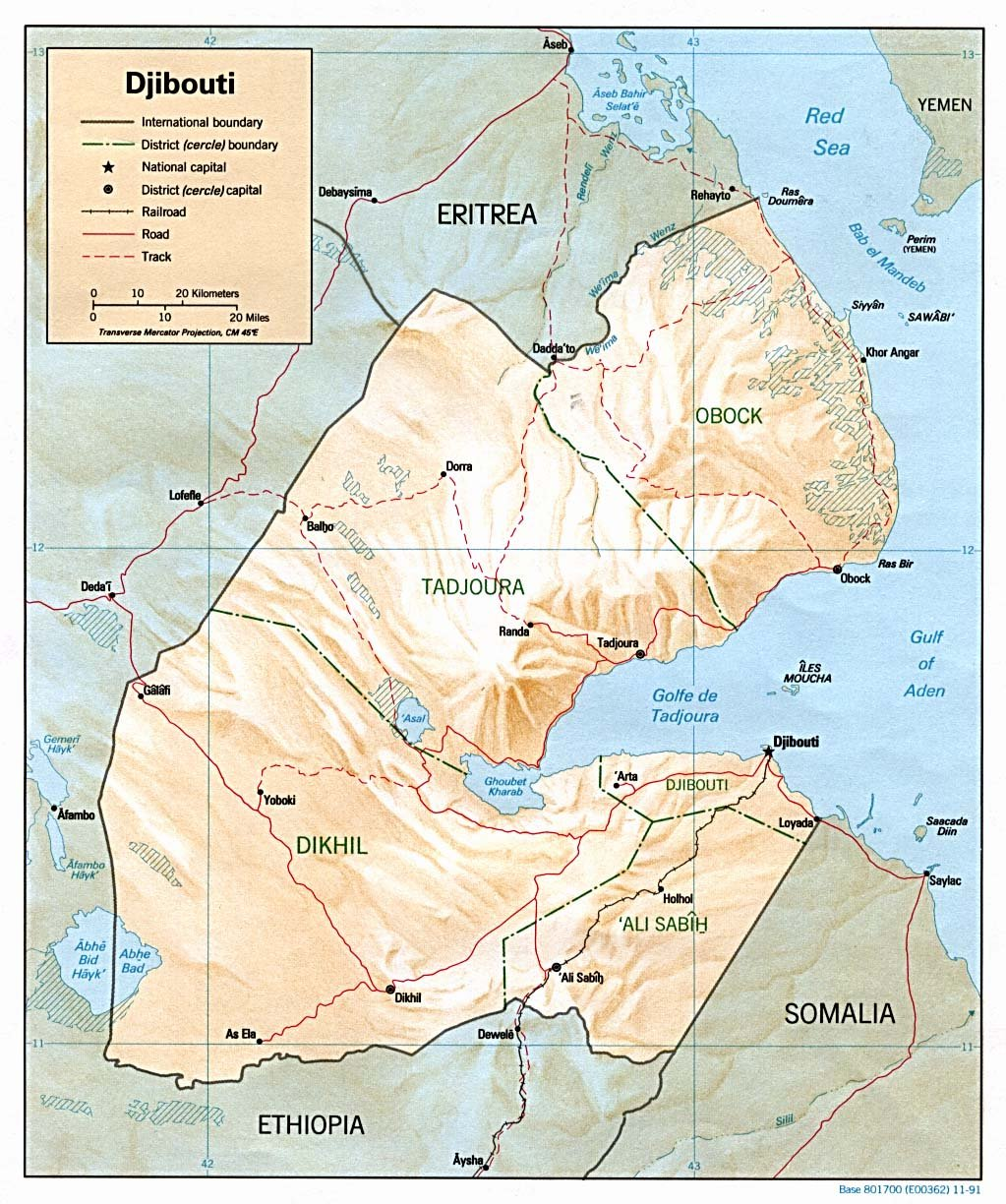
(1) Goda Mountains (2) Mabla Mountains in the northern part of Djibouti

The wildlife of Djibouti, consisting of its flora and fauna, is in a harsh landscape with forest accounting for less than one percent of its area. Most species are found in the northern part of the country in the Day Forest National Park at an average elevation of 1,500 metres (4,900 ft), including the massif Goda, with a peak of 1,783 metres (5,850 ft). It covers an area of 3.5 square kilometres (1.4 sq mi) of Juniperus procera forest, with many of the trees rising to 20 metres (66 ft) height. This forest area is the main habitat of the critically endangered and endemic Djibouti spurfowl, and another recently noted vertebrate, Platyceps afarensis. The area also contains many species of woody and herbaceous plants, including boxwood and olive trees, which account for sixty percent of the identified species in the country.

Wildlife are also found in the country's wetland ecosystem which includes two large lakes, Lake Assal and Lake Abbe (only a small part of the flats of this lake are in Djibouti), and many salt pans which are flooded occasionally from the wadis and the coastal tidal wetlands. The coastal belt of Djibouti also has a diversity of marine life or aquatic ecosystem, including coral reefs.

According to the country profile related to biodiversity of wildlife in Djibouti, the country contains some 820 species of plants, 493 species of invertebrates, 455 species of fish, 40 species of reptiles, 3 species of amphibians, 360 species of birds and 66 species of mammals. Wildlife of Djibouti is also listed as part of Horn of Africa biodiversity hotspot and the Red Sea and Gulf of Aden coral reef hotspot.

== Legal instruments ==
Day Forest National Park was declared a national park in 1939 by the then governor of the country, when Djibouti (an independent nation in 1977), was a French colony known as Territoire Français des Afars et des Issas (French Territory of the Afars and the Issas). Subsequent to Djibouti becoming independent, important laws enacted were: Resolution no 262/7 of 12 May 1972 relating to protection of natural wealth and prehistoric remains; Resolution no 72-1363 of 20 September 1972 for the protection of marine fauna and habitats and Decree No. 80-062/PR/MCTT of 25 May 1980 relating to the protection of marine fauna and habitats.

== Geography ==
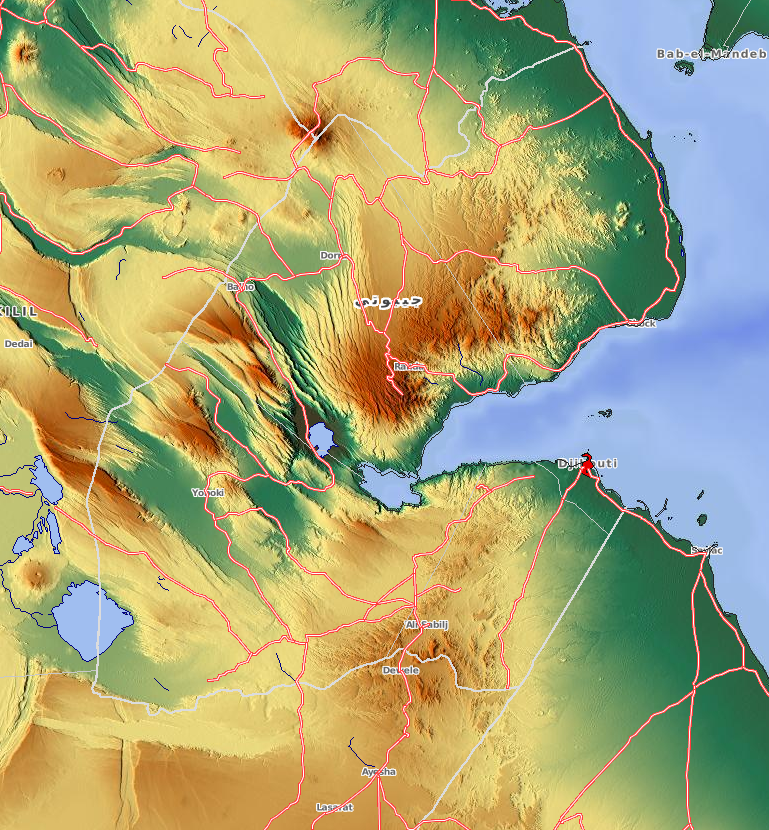
Relief map of Djibouti

Wildlife in Djibouti is spread over three main regions namely, from the northern mountain region of the country to the volcanic plateaus in its southern and central part and culminating in the coastal region. In spite of harsh climatic conditions, the terrain of basaltic origin and rhyolite is very rugged and has a succession of high plateaus and mountain ranges, and plateaus and hills of medium altitude. There is naturally very little arable land in desert areas. The highest peak is Mount Moussa and there are two major lakes: Lake Assal which is saline at (-) 155 metres (509 ft) (the lowest point in Africa); and Lake Abbe, the major part of which is in Ethiopia and sourced by Awash River and its tributaries, also originating in Ethiopia with only small flats as part of Djibouti. Apart from the two large lakes, Djibouti lacks perennial rivers and hence the dependence for water is more on ground water sources. Thus, in Djibouti's wildlife, in the harsh terrain, forests account for less than one percent of its total land area of 23,200 square kilometres (9,000 sq mi). Pans, foothills and tidal wetlands, and Djibouti areas under the Eritrean Coastal Desert Ecoregion, though not brought under protection laws, also have some degree of wildlife of vegetation and fauna.

The northern region has the Goda massif and the relic vegetation of the flora particularly, Juniperus procera. Fauna species, in particular the critically endangered Djibouti spurfowl, are found in the northern part of the country which are protected under the Day Forest National Park, the only national park in Djibouti.

=== Climate ===
Climatically, the coolest area in the country is in the forests of the Day National Park in the northern region with the low of 10 °C (50 °F), while the rest of the country experiences hot climatic conditions with temperature soaring to more than 40 °C (104 °F) in summer. Humidity is also very high during this period. The variation of rainfall, which occurs for about 26 days in a year, is very wide. It ranges from as low as 5 inches (130 mm) in the coastal regions whereas in the northern and mountainous portions of the country, it is about 15 inches (380 mm). Rain falls between January and March, in short periods and with heavy intensity, causing flash floods.

=== Day Forest National Park ===
The Day Forest National Park is a woodland habitat, which includes part of the forest mass of the Goda mountain massif. The Goda mountain's forests, the east face of which is part of the park, is considered a "spectacular natural oddity ... rare species of green on Djibouti's parched map like a giant oasis". It is located 30 kilometres (19 mi) west of the Gulf of Tadjoura. The Goda Mountains, which rise to a height of 1,783 metres (5,850 ft), lie northwest of the Gulf of Tadjoura, Afar Region and forms Djibouti's largest vegetated area. The park protects at least four known endemic plant species. The forest is dominated by such trees as Juniperus procera, Olea africana, Buxus hildebrandtii, and Tarchonanthus camphoratus. Distribution of the plants in the park varies with elevation. Vegetation above 950 metres (3,120 ft), where the topography is rugged, consists of those species already mentioned. Vegetation below 950 metres (3,120 ft), which has the benefit of better water sources, consists of Buxus hildebranti, Terminalia brownie and Acacia spp.

The forest of junipers is under long-term environmental threat. A million years ago, its area was believed to have been 40,000 hectares (99,000 acres) but as of 1990 it was only 900 hectares (2,200 acres) . Loss is attributed to climate change and human destruction, including fires, cattle grazing, tree felling and military exercises.) The World Wide Fund for Nature (WWF) has reported that 88 percent of the Day Forest has been lost in the last two centuries, and more than 20 percent of the loss has occurred in the last 50 years.

=== Lakes and salt pans ===
Lake Assal's peripheral salt pans support Red Sea coastal salt desert vegetation. Lake Abbe, at the southern end of Djibouti, is fed by the Awash River and its tributaries, which flows from Ethiopia and local ephemeral streams. The hills nearby feed many other small pans. Drainage from the southwestern part feeds Lake Assal, while those from the northeastern plateau feed the pans or flow into the sea. There are 20 pans in the northeast and east of Lake Abbe, a number of small pans and one large pan of 20,000 hectares (49,000 acres) area to the north and northeast of Lake Assal at elevations of 300–600 metres (980–1,970 ft) support very little vegetation. Pans and valley floors of small wadis (streams) in the coastal hills lying at range of 50–100 metres (160–330 ft), and the largest of these pans covers 20,000 hectares (49,000 acres). They have salt marsh or salt desert vegetation.

=== Coastal Desert Ecoregion ===
The Eritrean Coastal Desert Ecoregion stretches along the southern coast of the Red Sea from Balfair Assoli in Eritrea to Ras Bir; it forms the shores of Yemen and Djibouti funnel. During every autumn, large bird migrations have been recorded in the Obock area of Djibouti. The most common species recorded are the dorcas gazelle, Soemmerring's gazelle, and Salt's dik-dik. This ecoregion in Djibouti's Ras Siyyan consists of rocky terrain, old coral reefs seen during low tide, and sandy beaches. Among the several offshore islands in this region are the Sept Frères islands, an archipelago of Djibouti.

This region lies below 200 metres (660 ft), and is generally flat with sand or gravel plains interspersed with occasional outcrop of rocks. The coastline near Ras Siyyan is a mix of rocky areas, old coral reefs that are exposed only at low tide, and sandy beaches. The ecoregion has remained undisturbed, but degraded near populated areas and, due to hunting, is now proposed to be brought under protection laws.

== Flora ==
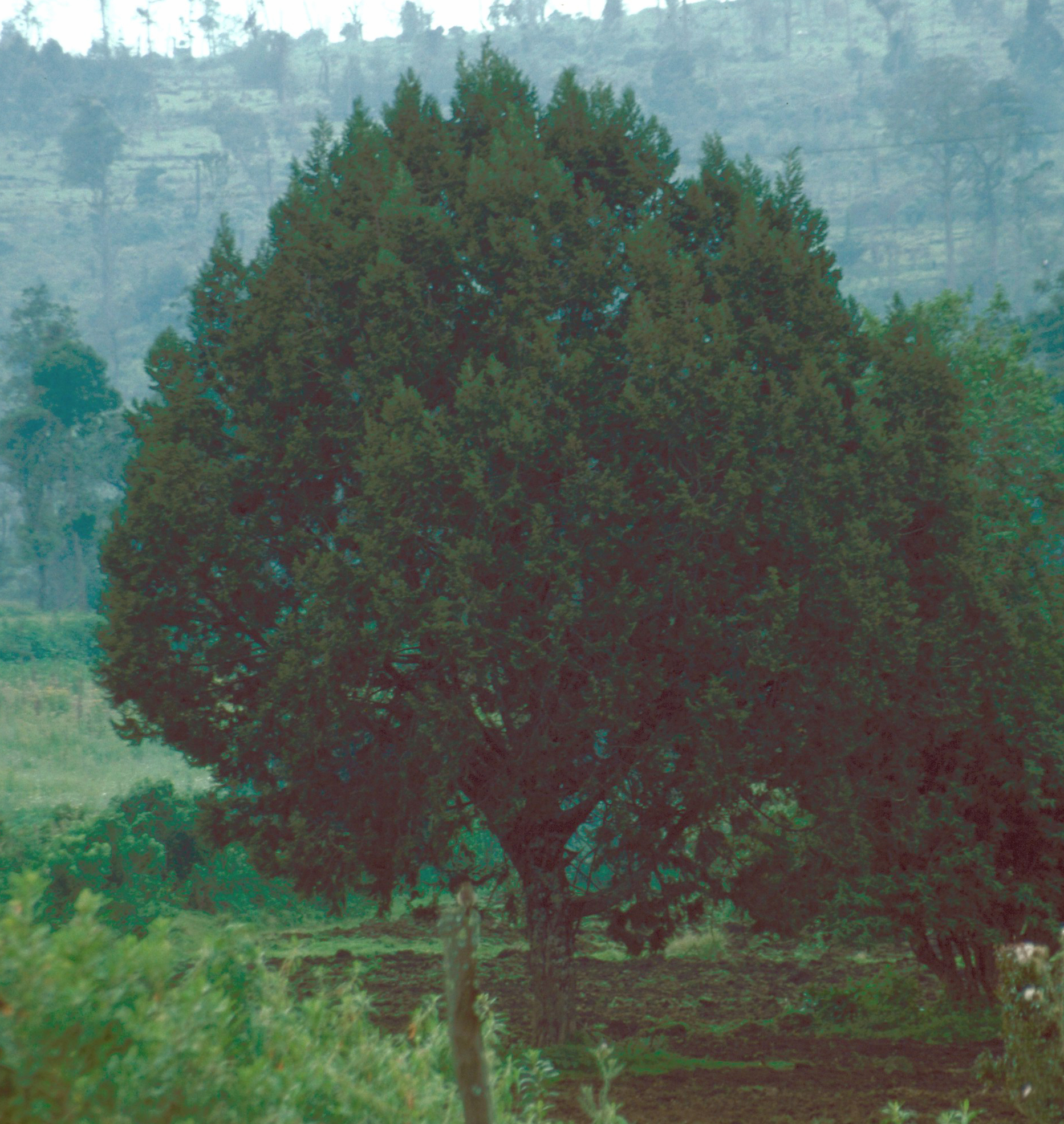
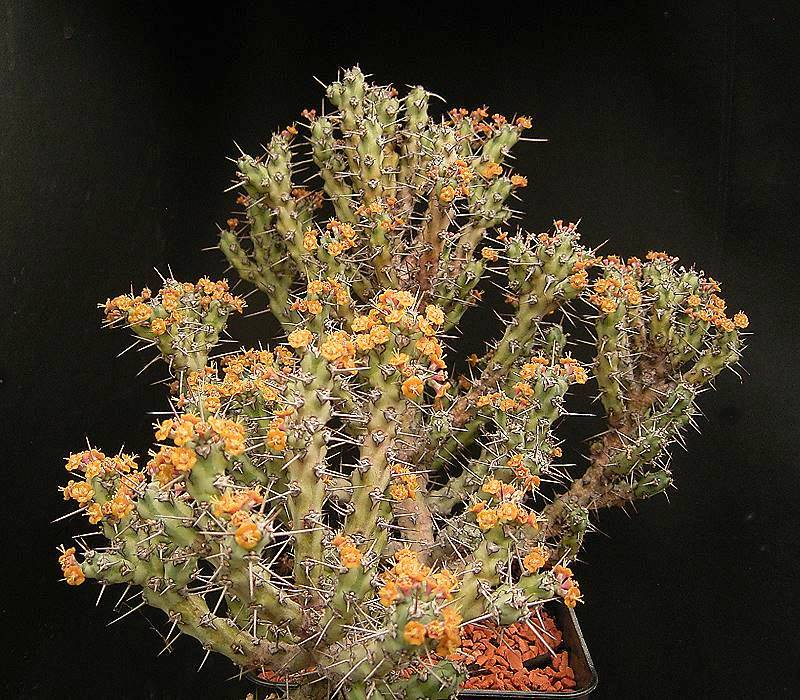
Left: juniper tree. Right: Euphorbia godana.

Most of the land in Djibouti is desert. However, wildlife vegetation is made up of semi-desert grassland, shrub land and succulent scrub. The coastal area consists of desert and mangrove. Dry evergreen forests are in the mountains of Mount Goda in the Day National Park near Tadjoura and Mabla mountains. On Mount Goda, near Tadjoura, there are rare giant juniper trees, acacias, and wild olive trees. However, most of the vegetation is typical of the desert and semi-desert, consisting of thorn scrubs and palm trees. There are 534 species of plants recorded in the Goda and Mabla mountains including a number of endemic species. Two species of particular interest are the Nubian tree (Dracaena ombet) and the Bankouale palm (Livistona carinensis) in the national park. Other species reported as unique to Djibouti are: Aloe djiboutiensis, Aloe ericahenriettae, Euphorbia godana, Euphorbia amicorum, Phagnalon lavranosii, Cynoglossopsis somaliensis, Caralluma mireillae, Polygala goudahensis and Matthiola puntensis.

Vegetation recorded on the periphery of lakes, pans, wadi valley beds and coastal foothills are: Cenchrus ciliaris, Aeloropus lagopoides, Aeloropus persica, Cenchrus ciliaris, Calatropis procera, Cyperus conglomeratus, Chloris flagellifera (syn. Eleusine compressa), Halopeplis perfoliata, Heliotropum pterocarpum, Panicum turgidum, Salsola forskalii, Sporobolus spicatus, Suaeda monoica, Trianthema crystalline and Urochondra setulosa. Acacia tortilis and Cadaba glandulosa are also found on some of the wadis.

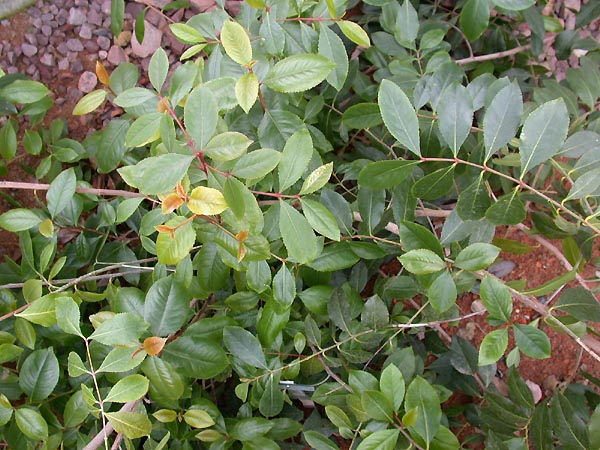
The medicinal plant khat (Catha edulis), endemic to Djibouti, creates a state of euphoria.

Flora recorded in the Coastal Desert Ecoregion are: herbaceous/grassy steppe species of Aerva javanica, Cymbopogon schoenanthus, Panicum turgidum, Lasiurus scindicus, Acacia tortilis, Acacia asak steppe, Rhigozum somalense, Caesalpinia erianthera shrubland. The coastal vegetation in this region consists of halophytic vegetation with mangroves species of Rhizophora mucronata, Ceriops tagal and Avicennia marina. The ecoregion also has xeric grasslands and shrublands in the inland areas of the coast.

The medicinal plant khat (Catha edulis) occurs in Djibouti where it is chewed by 90% of the men; its effect is a state of euphoria.

== Fauna ==
In the Coastal Desert Ecoregion, resident fauna and few endemics are reported. These consists mainly of three near-endemic species of reptiles, the Ogaden burrowing asp (Atractaspis leucomelas), Ragazzi's cylindrical skink (Chalcides ragazzii), and Indian leaf-toed gecko (Hemidactylus flaviviridis). In its animal reserves, Djibouti has antelopes, gazelles, hyenas, and jackals.

=== Mammals ===
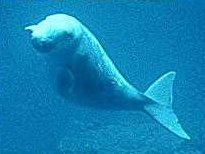
Dugong found in the coastal region

Mammals include several species of antelope, such as Soemmerring's gazelle (Nanger soemmerringii) and Pelzeln's gazelle (Gazella dorcas pelzelnii). As a result of the hunting ban imposed since early 1970 these species are well conserved now. Other characteristic mammals are Grevy's zebra, hamadryas baboon and Hunter's antelope. The warthog, a vulnerable species, is also found in the Day National Park. The coastal waters have dugongs and Abyssinian genets; the latter need confirmation by further studies. Green and hawksbill turtles are in the coastal waters where nesting also takes place. The Northeast African cheetah (Acinonyx jubatus soemmeringii) are thought to be extinct in Djibouti. However, there are refuges where the cheetahs are breeding.

In the southern mountain range of Aser-Jog, in Djibouti, the beira antelope (Dorcatragus megalotis), an endemic and vulnerable species is reported. At least 99 individuals have been recorded. However, they face competition from cattle in grazing. Hence, a proposal has been made to establish a wildlife refuge.

=== Birds ===
The Djibouti spurfowl is endemic and is a critically endangered bird species.

The bird species reported in Djibouti consists of 399 species including one endemic (native) species, eight globally threatened species, and two introduced species. Further details under categories of the endemic, critically endangered, endangered, near-threatened and vulnerable are elaborated. However, 26 species of raptors have been reported in the coastal ecoregion. Of these, the steppe buzzard (Buteo buteo vulpinus) and the steppe eagle (Aquila nipalensis) are most common.

The only endemic species found is the Djibouti spurfowl (Pternistis ochropectus) which is critically endangered. It is found in two locations in Djibouti, the Forêt du Day National Park in the Goda Mountains and Mabla Mountains; the former is about 25 kilometres (16 mi) north of the Gulf of Tadjoura and the latter is 80 kilometres (50 mi) northeast of the Forêt du Day. The species was declared critically endangered by the IUCN since its population underwent a 90% decline over twenty years. The Djibouti spurfowl preferred dense African juniper woodland with a closed canopy on a plateau when this tree was in abundance. It has now adapted to live in the boxwood Buxus sempervirens and the woody shrub (Clutia abyssinia). The bird remains hidden in the dense undergrowth of boxwood and clutia during the day. It roosts on these trees which grow to 16–26 metres (52–85 ft) height. They search for food in the evenings and mostly feed on figs, small fruits, termites and insects. The Djibouti spurfowl has been featured on two stamps; one of 35 francs, in 1989 from Djibouti, and another of 500 francs denomination from the French Territory of the Afars and the Issas as Djibouti was known during the French rule, in 1972.

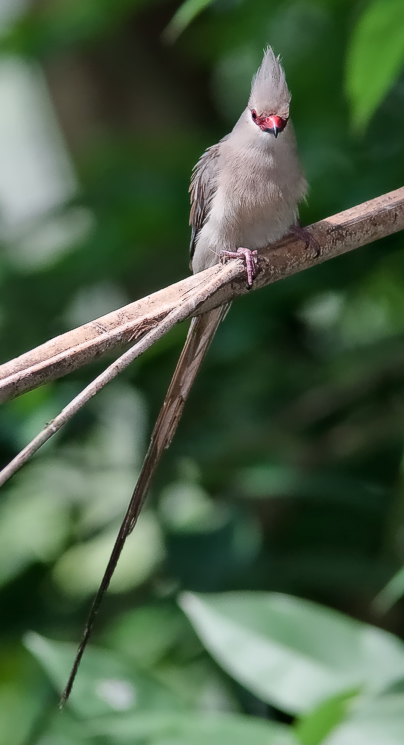
Urocolius macrourus

The endangered species reported are: Atlantic petrel (Pterodroma incerta), Egyptian vulture (Neophron percnopterus) and saker falcon (Falco cherrug).

The near-threatened bird species are: ferruginous duck (Aythya nyroca), lesser flamingo (Phoenicopterus minor), Jouanin's petrel (Bulweria fallax), white-backed vulture (Gyps africanus), pallid harrier (Circus macrourus), Rueppell's griffon (Gyps rueppellii), red-footed falcon (Falco vespertinus), sooty falcon (Falco concolor), corn crake (Crex crex), Eurasian curlew (Numenius arquata), black-tailed godwit (Limosa limosa), white-eyed gull (Ichthyaetus leucophthalmus) and European roller (Coracias garrulus).

The vulnerable bird species reported are: Socotra cormorant (Phalacrocorax nigrogularis), white-headed vulture (Trigonoceps occipitalis), Beaudouin's snake-eagle (Circaetus beaudouini), greater spotted eagle (Clanga clanga), imperial eagle (Aquila heliaca) and lesser kestrel (Falco naumanni).

=== Invertebrates ===
The invertebrates species reported are: Eunidia djiboutiana; a dung beetle, Trichonotulus secquorum; Lophothericles popovi, a grasshopper; Cryncus dmitrievi, a cricket; and Euprosthenopsis vachoni, a nursery web spider.

=== Aqua fauna ===
Seabird colonies are present in the coastal belt. The Sept Frères islands, in particular have breeding colonies of swift terns (Sterna bergii) and lesser-crested terns (Sterna bengalensis).
