= Ambabbo =

Ambabbo أمبابو
- Location in Djibouti
- Coordinates: 11°45′N 42°49′E
- Country: Djibouti
- Region: Tadjoura

Ambabbo (Arabic: أمبابو) is a village in eastern Djibouti. It is located in the region of Tadjoura.

== History ==
The missionaries Carl Wilhelm Isenberg, and Johann Ludwig Krapf spent a night at Ambabbo (which they called "Anbabo") in 1839, describing it as a resting-place, "where the caravans usually halt" on the shore of the bay Ghubbat-el Kharab. Charles Johnston, passing through this settlement about three years later, described it as "a small native village of about eight houses".

== Location ==
Nearby towns and villages include Airolaf (9.6 nm), Bankouale (9.3 nm), Oue`a (8.3 nm), Tadjoura (4.6 nm) and `Arta (13.8 nm).
