= Adoyla =

- Location in Djibouti
- Coordinates: 11°57′31″N 42°38′52″E
- Country: Djibouti
- Region: Tadjoura
- Elevation: 961 m (3,153 ft)

Adoyla is a town in central Djibouti in the largest region, that of Tadjourah Region.

== Overview ==
The settlement lies in a small valley, north of the RN9 road, which leaves the coast to the south to head west towards Dorra. It is within 13 miles (21 km) of the Day Forest National Park in the Goda Mountains to the south.

== Geography ==
A river runs through the town. Often dry, the watercourse divides Adoyla in half. The surrounding mountains to the west are high and jagged, lengthening journeys in that direction.

== Wildlife ==
Due to the fertility of the region, experienced in many years, wild mammals such as gazelle and mountain goats migrate to the area either to breed or to live and graze on the grassland savannah.
