= Malaho =

Malaho مالاهو
- Town
- Location in Djibouti
- Coordinates: 12°05′24″N 42°13′44″E
- Country: Djibouti
- Region: Tadjoura
- Elevation: 310 m (1,020 ft)

Population (2024 census)
  - Total: 967

Malaho (Arabic: مالاهو) is a town in northern Tadjoura Region of Djibouti. It is situated about 114 kilometres (70 miles) north of Tadjoura and 13 km (8 mi) west of the border with Ethiopia.

== Overview ==
It lies on the National Highway 11. Nearby towns and villages include Balho, Dorra and Randa.
