= Mouddo =

- Town
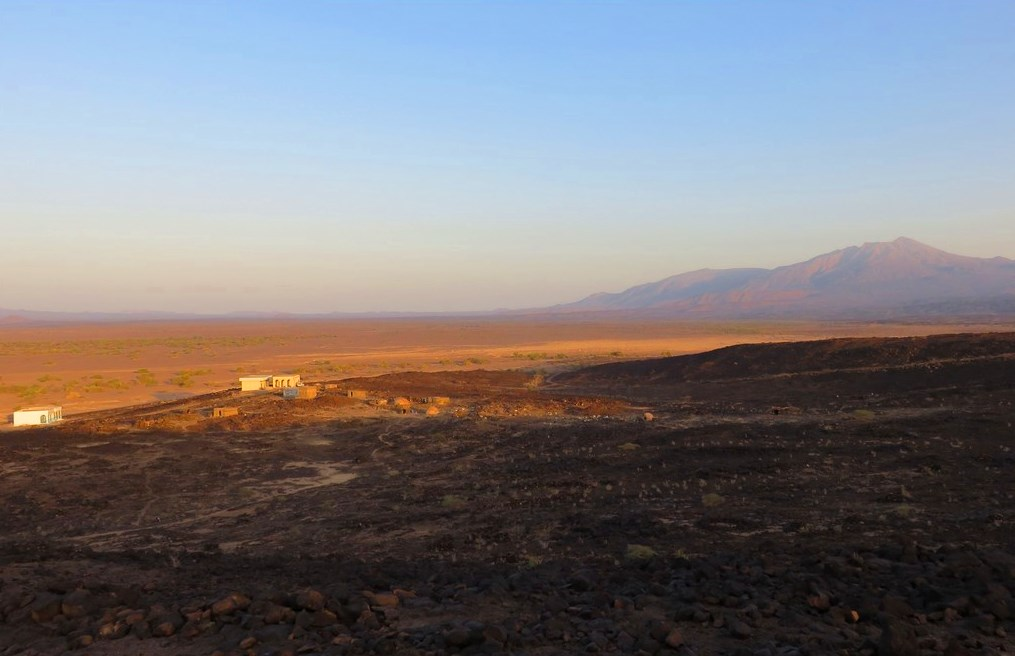
- Mouddo view of Mousa Ali

- Location in Djibouti
- Coordinates: 12°18′N 42°26′E
- Country: Djibouti
- Region: Tadjoura
- Elevation: 310 m (1,020 ft)

Mouddo (Arabic: مودو) is a town in the northern Tadjoura region of Djibouti. Mouddo is on the edge of depression Andabba of a flooded plain case (very rare) of rain. It is situated about 90 kilometres (56 miles) north of Tadjoura and 14 km (8 mi) east of the border with Ethiopia.

== Overview ==
There was a single class school until late 1980. A second class and a dormitory were then built. The civil war of the 1990s led to the closure and the deterioration of the school, which was reopened ten years later. The school Mouddo hosts hundreds of students from the Andabba or Madgoul areas.

== Climate ==
Mouddo has a hot desert climate (Köppen climate classification BWh). Mouddo is noted for its very high summer humidity despite being a desert town. This combination of the desert heat and high humidity makes the apparent temperatures seem even more extreme. The sky is usually clear and bright throughout the year.

Climate data for Madgoul
Month	Jan	Feb	Mar	Apr	May	Jun	Jul	Aug	Sep	Oct	Nov	Dec	Year
Mean daily maximum °C (°F)	28.0 (82.4)	28.7 (83.7)	30.6 (87.1)	32.7 (90.9)	35.8 (96.4)	38.7 (101.7)	39.0 (102.2)	38.3 (100.9)	36.6 (97.9)	33.3 (91.9)	30.5 (86.9)	28.6 (83.5)	33.4 (92.1)
Mean daily minimum °C (°F)	19.5 (67.1)	21.0 (69.8)	22.1 (71.8)	24.2 (75.6)	26.4 (79.5)	29.0 (84.2)	28.5 (83.3)	27.5 (81.5)	26.4 (79.5)	24.3 (75.7)	22.0 (71.6)	20.1 (68.2)	24.3 (75.7)
Average rainfall mm (inches)	8 (0.3)	9 (0.4)	12 (0.5)	15 (0.6)	8 (0.3)	4 (0.2)	22 (0.9)	28 (1.1)	19 (0.7)	7 (0.3)	13 (0.5)	9 (0.4)	154 (6.2)
Source: Climate-Data.org, altitude: 310m
