= Adailou =

Adailou أديلو
- Town
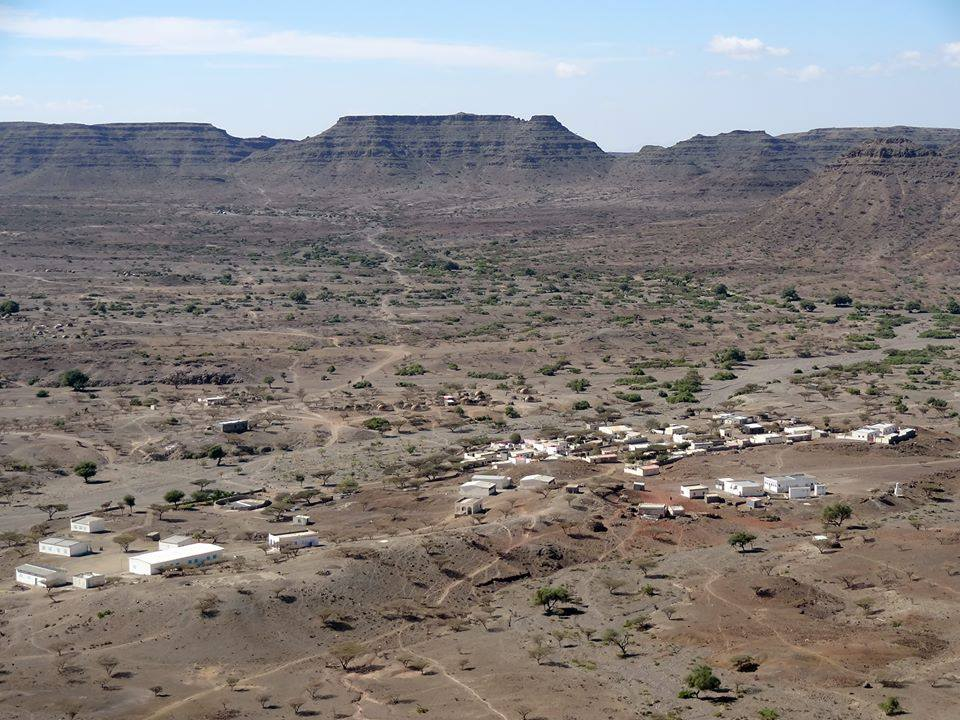

- Location in Djibouti
- Coordinates: 11°57′N 42°44′E
- Country: Djibouti
- Region: Tadjoura
- Elevation: 1,050 m (3,440 ft)

Population (2024 census)
  - Total: 867

Adailou (Arabic: أديلو) is a town in the Tadjoura region of Djibouti. It sprawls on a wide basin surrounded by granitic mountains on all sides. Adailou has one of the mildest climates in Djibouti, which is not always passable during the rainy season.

== Overview ==
Adaylou is one of the largest villages in the Tadjourah region north of Djibouti. According to tradition, the village is where the ancestor of Adaal, Haral-Maahis, gave birth to his lineage.

== Demographics ==
The majority of the population of Adailou is Afars.

== Economy ==
One of the distinctive features of Adailou countryside is the widespread growing of vegetables. Many farms are located throughout the town.

== Climate ==
Known for its mild climate, Adailou is unusual like Airolaf and Randa in hosting a large camp in the summer, during which life in Tadjoura and Djibouti City is difficult because of the heat. Winters are mild with an average temperature of 18 °C or 64.4 °F and an average minimum of 13 °C or 55.4 °F in January, the coolest month. Summers are hot with June being the hottest month, averaging 34.4 °C or 93.9 °F during the day and 23 °C or 73.4 °F during the night. The town has its dry season from April through to May.

Adailou has overall a hot semi-arid climate (BSh) in Köppen-Geiger system.

Climate data for Adailou
Month	Jan	Feb	Mar	Apr	May	Jun	Jul	Aug	Sep	Oct	Nov	Dec	Year
Mean daily maximum °C (°F)	23.0 (73.4)	24.0 (75.2)	25.9 (78.6)	28.0 (82.4)	31.0 (87.8)	34.2 (93.6)	34.4 (93.9)	33.5 (92.3)	31.9 (89.4)	28.6 (83.5)	25.8 (78.4)	23.5 (74.3)	28.7 (83.6)
Mean daily minimum °C (°F)	13.0 (55.4)	14.8 (58.6)	16.0 (60.8)	18.2 (64.8)	20.3 (68.5)	23.2 (73.8)	23.0 (73.4)	22.4 (72.3)	22.1 (71.8)	18.2 (64.8)	15.8 (60.4)	14.0 (57.2)	18.4 (65.1)
Average rainfall mm (inches)	36 (1.4)	34 (1.3)	22 (0.9)	28 (1.1)	14 (0.6)	8 (0.3)	26 (1.0)	39 (1.5)	39 (1.5)	13 (0.5)	35 (1.4)	28 (1.1)	322 (12.6)
Source: Climate-Data.org
