= Itki =

- Town
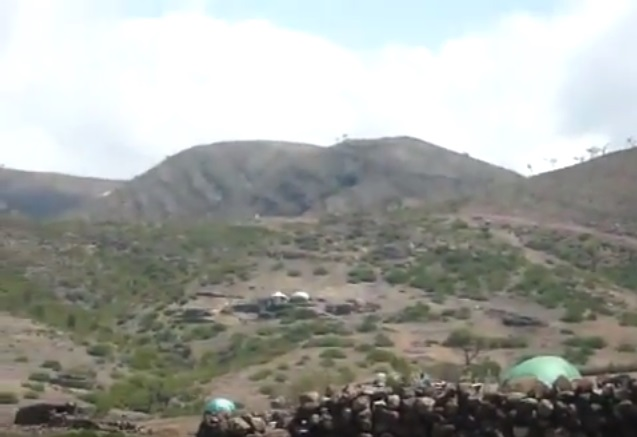

- Location in Djibouti
- Coordinates: 11°44′46″N 42°36′32″E
- Country: Djibouti
- Region: Tadjoura
- Elevation: 1,467 m (4,813 ft)

Population
  - Total: 750

Itki is a town in the Tadjoura Region in northwestern Djibouti. The surrounding district is rich in both livestock and fledgeling agriculture. Itki has one of the mildest climates in Djibouti.

== Demographics ==
The majority of the population of Itki is Afars.

== Climate ==
The prevailing climate in Itki is known as a local steppe climate. The warmest month of the year is June with an average temperature of 30.5 °C. In January, the average temperature is 19.1 °C. Itki is situated on top of Goda Mountains, in a mountainous and hilly area, and represents a key focal point for wildlife. The town's unusual fertility and greenery in the largely arid countryside has attracted many fauna, such as gazelles, birds and camels.

Climate data for Itki
Month	Jan	Feb	Mar	Apr	May	Jun	Jul	Aug	Sep	Oct	Nov	Dec	Year
Mean daily maximum °C (°F)	22.3 (72.1)	22.8 (73.0)	24.8 (76.6)	26.6 (79.9)	29.6 (85.3)	32.3 (90.1)	31.7 (89.1)	30.8 (87.4)	29.8 (85.6)	26.9 (80.4)	24.3 (75.7)	22.5 (72.5)	27.0 (80.6)
Mean daily minimum °C (°F)	11.3 (52.3)	12.4 (54.3)	13.6 (56.5)	15.8 (60.4)	17.8 (64.0)	20.3 (68.5)	19.8 (67.6)	19.1 (66.4)	19.0 (66.2)	15.4 (59.7)	13.2 (55.8)	11.8 (53.2)	15.8 (60.4)
Average precipitation mm (inches)	34 (1.3)	36 (1.4)	32 (1.3)	43 (1.7)	23 (0.9)	12 (0.5)	47 (1.9)	68 (2.7)	54 (2.1)	15 (0.6)	32 (1.3)	22 (0.9)	418 (16.6)
Source: Climate-Data.org
