= Assa Hougoud =

- Location in Djibouti
- Coordinates: 11°47′N 42°48′E
- Country: Djibouti
- Region: Tadjoura
- Elevation: 105 m (344 ft)

Population
  - Total: 672

Assa Hougoud (Arabic: أسا هوغود) is a city in central Djibouti. It is situated at the crossroads of the National Highway 9 and National Highway 11.
