= Debne =

- Location in Djibouti
- Coordinates: 11°57′N 42°50′E
- Country: Djibouti
- Region: Tadjoura
- Elevation: 897 m (2,943 ft)

Debne is a town in central Djibouti located in Tadjoura. It sprawls on a wide basin surrounded by granitic mountains on all sides. It contains a wide variety of minerals and metals such as fieldspar and gold.

== Climate ==
Debne has a hot semi-arid climate (BSh) in Köppen-Geiger system.

Climate data for Debne
Month	Jan	Feb	Mar	Apr	May	Jun	Jul	Aug	Sep	Oct	Nov	Dec	Year
Mean daily maximum °C (°F)	25.0 (77.0)	25.6 (78.1)	26.9 (80.4)	28.0 (82.4)	31.2 (88.2)	34.5 (94.1)	34.7 (94.5)	33.3 (91.9)	32.2 (90.0)	28.6 (83.5)	26.8 (80.2)	25.5 (77.9)	29.4 (84.9)
Mean daily minimum °C (°F)	14.4 (57.9)	16.0 (60.8)	17.7 (63.9)	19.4 (66.9)	21.6 (70.9)	25.0 (77.0)	24.4 (75.9)	23.5 (74.3)	22.4 (72.3)	19.4 (66.9)	17.2 (63.0)	15.5 (59.9)	19.7 (67.5)
Average precipitation mm (inches)	35 (1.4)	33 (1.3)	25 (1.0)	19 (0.7)	9 (0.4)	7 (0.3)	10 (0.4)	38 (1.5)	40 (1.6)	14 (0.6)	37 (1.5)	34 (1.3)	301 (12)
Source: Climate-Data.org
