= Guirrari =

Guirrari غيراري
- Town
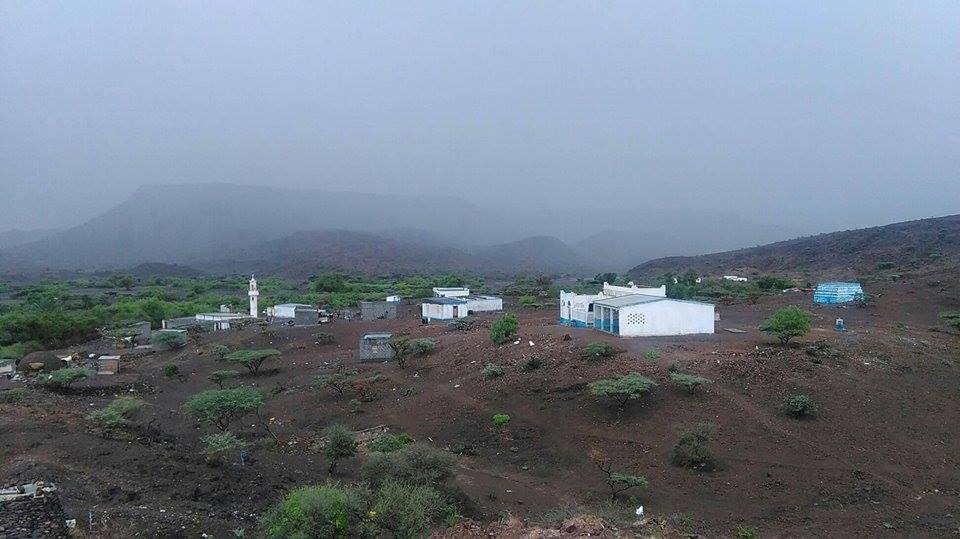

- Location in Djibouti
- Coordinates: 12°03′N 42°47′E
- Country: Djibouti
- Region: Tadjourah
- Elevation: 831 m (2,726 ft)

Guirrari (Arabic: غيراري) is a town in the northern Tadjourah region of Djibouti. Its population, with the nomadic and semi-nomadic neighborhoods is estimated at 500 people.

== Agriculture ==
Guirrari is noted for its agricultural and farming industry. Crops grown in the area include vegetables and fruits. Significant investments have been made in the industry.

== Climate ==
Guirrari has a hot arid climate (BWh) by the Köppen-Geiger system.

Climate data for Guirrari
| Month | Jan | Feb | Mar | Apr | May | Jun | Jul | Aug | Sep | Oct | Nov | Dec | Year |
|---|---|---|---|---|---|---|---|---|---|---|---|---|---|
| Mean daily maximum °C (°F) | 24.7 (76.5) | 24.9 (76.8) | 26.9 (80.4) | 28.9 (84.0) | 32.1 (89.8) | 35.3 (95.5) | 35.9 (96.6) | 35.0 (95.0) | 33.1 (91.6) | 29.7 (85.5) | 26.8 (80.2) | 25.0 (77.0) | 29.9 (85.7) |
| Mean daily minimum °C (°F) | 14.2 (57.6) | 15.7 (60.3) | 17.6 (63.7) | 19.6 (67.3) | 22.1 (71.8) | 25.0 (77.0) | 24.7 (76.5) | 24.1 (75.4) | 23.8 (74.8) | 19.9 (67.8) | 17.0 (62.6) | 15.5 (59.9) | 19.9 (67.9) |
| Average rainfall mm (inches) | 28 (1.1) | 27 (1.1) | 19 (0.7) | 23 (0.9) | 12 (0.5) | 6 (0.2) | 20 (0.8) | 31 (1.2) | 31 (1.2) | 12 (0.5) | 32 (1.3) | 24 (0.9) | 265 (10.4) |
Source: Climate-Data.org, altitude: 841 metres or 2,760 feet
