= Oueʽa =

Oueʽa may refer to:

- Oued Ouea, a town in the Tadjourah region of Djibouti
- Weʽa, a town in the Arta region of Djibouti
