= Karabti San =

- Location in Djibouti
- Coordinates: 11°54′35″N 42°16′48″E
- Country: Djibouti
- Region: Tadjoura
- Elevation: 295 m (968 ft)

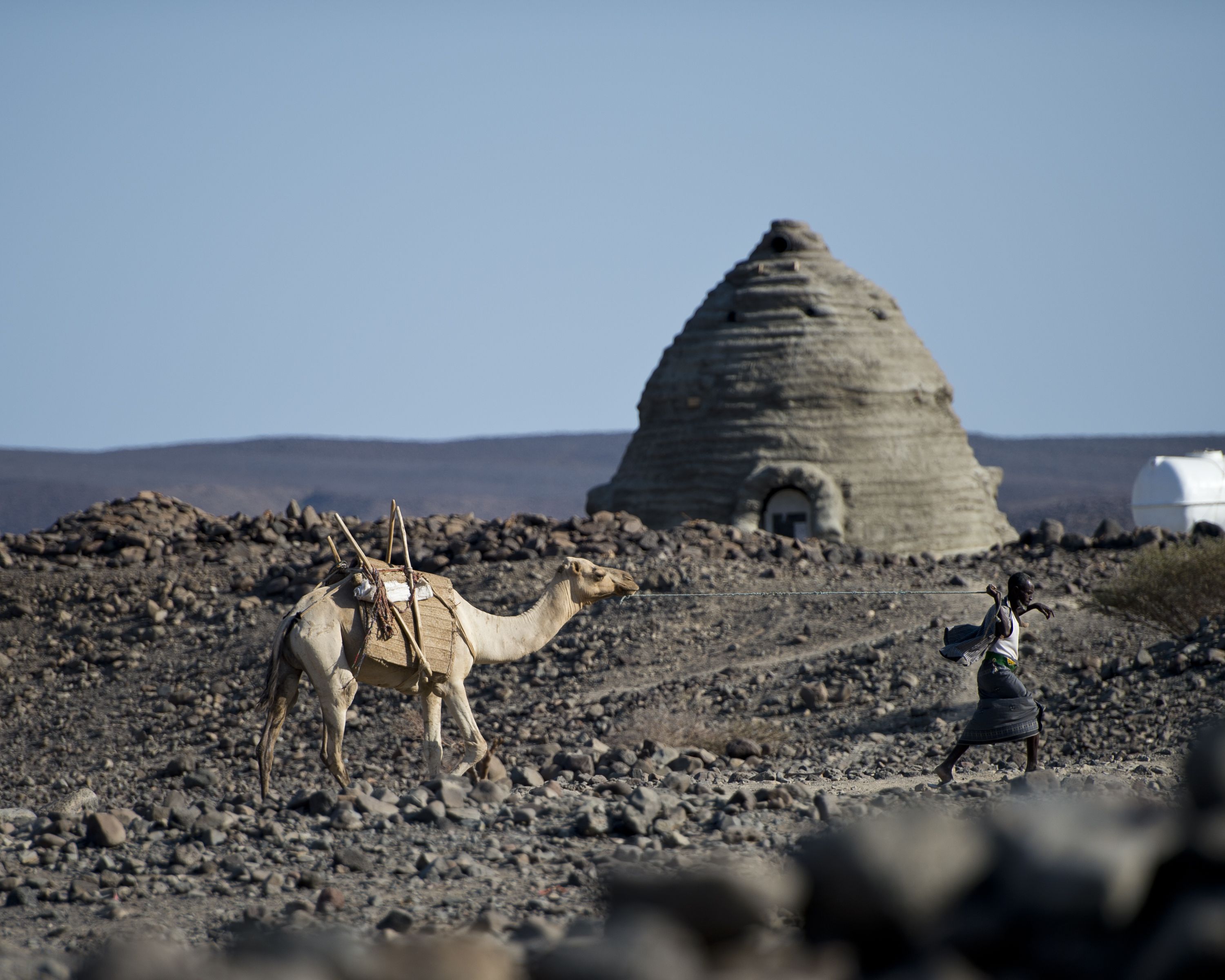
Eco dome in Karabti San

Karabti San is a village in Djibouti. It is located northwest of Djibouti City.
