= Madgoul, Djibouti =

Madgoul مدغول
- Town
- Location in Djibouti
- Coordinates: 12°21′46″N 42°27′54″E
- Country: Djibouti
- Region: Tadjourah
- Elevation: 307 m (1,007 ft)

Madgoul (Arabic: مدغول), also known as Madgul, is a town in the northern of Tadjoura Region. It is situated about 95 kilometres (59 miles) north of Tadjoura and 14 km (8 mi) east of the border with Ethiopia.

== Climate ==
Madgoul has a hot desert climate (BWh) in Köppen-Geiger system.

Climate data for Madgoul
Month	Jan	Feb	Mar	Apr	May	Jun	Jul	Aug	Sep	Oct	Nov	Dec	Year
Mean daily maximum °C (°F)	28.0 (82.4)	28.7 (83.7)	30.6 (87.1)	32.7 (90.9)	35.8 (96.4)	38.7 (101.7)	39.2 (102.6)	38.3 (100.9)	36.6 (97.9)	33.3 (91.9)	30.5 (86.9)	28.6 (83.5)	33.4 (92.2)
Mean daily minimum °C (°F)	20.0 (68.0)	21.0 (69.8)	22.3 (72.1)	24.1 (75.4)	26.4 (79.5)	29.1 (84.4)	28.6 (83.5)	28.0 (82.4)	28.0 (82.4)	24.3 (75.7)	22.0 (71.6)	20.8 (69.4)	24.6 (76.2)
Average rainfall mm (inches)	6 (0.2)	9 (0.4)	11 (0.4)	11 (0.4)	8 (0.3)	4 (0.2)	20 (0.8)	26 (1.0)	17 (0.7)	7 (0.3)	12 (0.5)	8 (0.3)	139 (5.5)
Source: Climate-Data.org, altitude: 307m
