= Alayto le Boyna =

Mountain in Djibouti

Alayto le Boyna Siyyarou
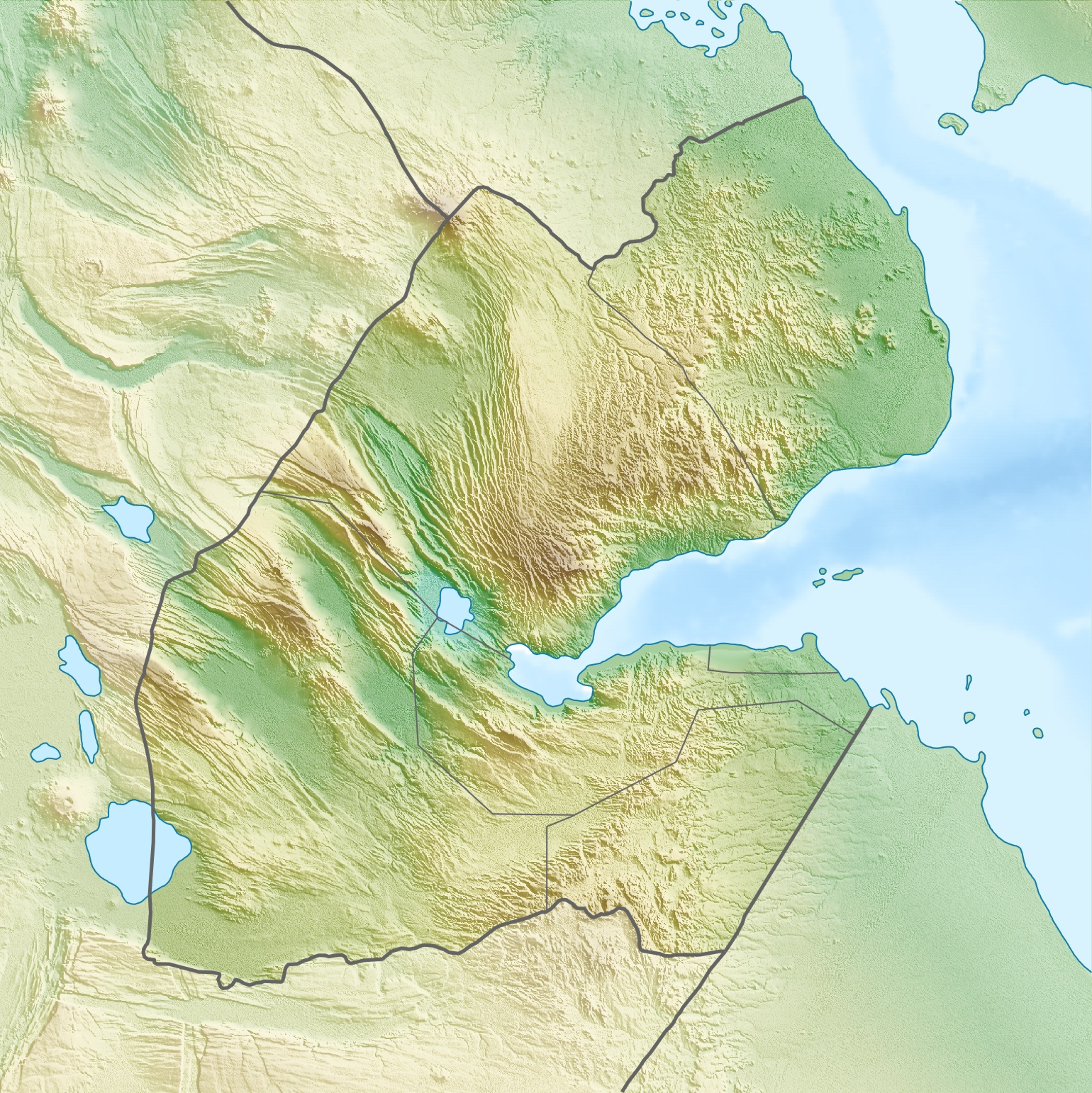
- Location within Djibouti

Highest point
- Elevation: 1,281 m (4,203 ft)
- Coordinates: 11°55′N 42°11′E

Geography
- Country: Djibouti
- Region: Tadjourah Region

The Alayto le Boyna or Siyyarou is a mountain range in Djibouti. It is located in the western part of the country, 170 km west of Djibouti City. The top of Alayto le Boyna is 1281 meters above sea level.

== Overview ==
The terrain around the Alayto le Boyna is mainly hilly. The highest point in the vicinity is 1281 meters above sea level, 2.7 km southeast of Alayto le Boyna. Around Alayto le Boyna it is very sparsely populated, with 7 inhabitants per square kilometer. There are no communities nearby. The neighborhood around Alayto le Boyna consists essentially of grasslands. In the neighborhood around Alayto le Boyna are unusually many named plains.
