= Mousa Ali =

Stratovolcano located on the tri-point borders of Ethiopia, Eritrea and Djibouti

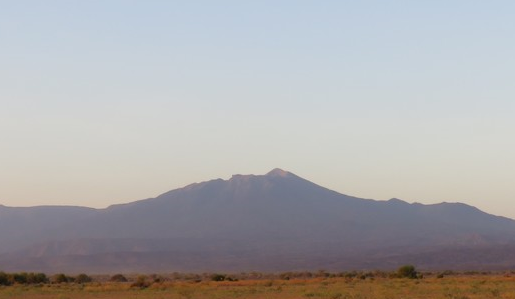
- Mousa Ali from Djibouti.

Highest point
- Elevation: 2,021 m (6,631 ft)
- Prominence: 1,607 m (5,272 ft)
- Listing: The highest point in Djibouti; Ultra; Ribu
- Coordinates: 12°28′07″N 42°24′15″E

Naming
- Native name: موسى علي (Arabic)

Geography
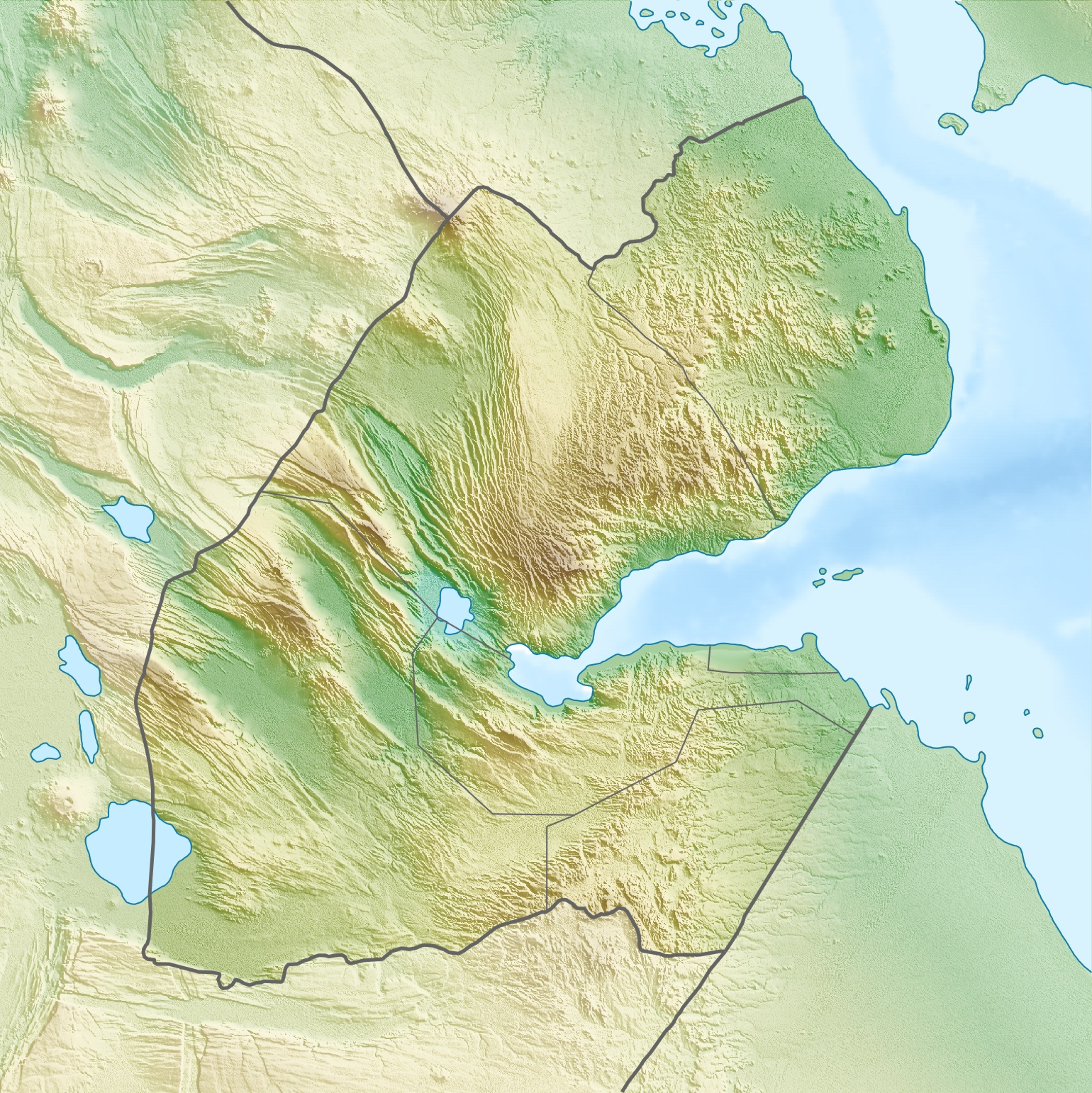
- Location within Djibouti
- Countries: Djibouti, Ethiopia and Eritrea
- Regions: Tadjourah Region, Afar Region and Southern Red Sea Region
- Parent range: Denakil

Geology
- Mountain type: Stratovolcano
- Last eruption: Holocene

Climbing
- First ascent: 1841

Mousa Ali (Arabic: موسى علي, French: Mousa Alli, Italian: Moussa Ali) is a 2,021 metres (6,631 ft) stratovolcano located on the tri-point of Ethiopia, Eritrea and Djibouti. The volcano is the highest point in Djibouti. The volcano's summit is truncated by a caldera, which contains rhyolitic lava domes and lava flows. The last known eruption occurred before the Holocene epoch.

Mousa Ali is situated at the tri-point of the Tadjourah Region of Djibouti, the Southern Red Sea Region of Eritrea, and the Afar Region of Ethiopia.

== Geography ==
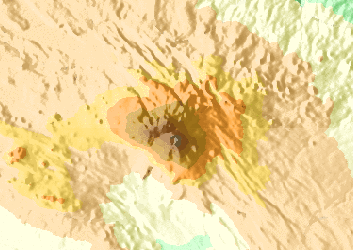
Mousa Ali relief map.

The mountain has two distinct summits, the higher being the south one with an elevation of 2,021 metres. The north summit in Ethiopia has an elevation of 1,871 metres. Both summits are separated by a large caldera, about 1 km (0.71 mi) wide and 1514 metres deep. Mousa Ali, in the northern part of the Great Rift Valley region, has Eritrea on its northern flank, Ethiopia on the west, and Djibouti the east and south. The Djiboutian town of Dorra is 36 km to the south-southeast, the Ethiopian volcano Manda-Inakir is 22 km to the southwest, and the road from the Ethiopian town of Manda to the Eritrean port of Assab is 19 km to the northwest.

== Wildlife and flora ==
The mountain is home to an abundance of wildlife, lush vegetation, flowering shrubs and trees and various plants.

== History ==
Two sects of Afar live in the area. They are collectively known as Adrúmmi, from 'Adó rum li or "white as Byzantines." The position of Ali Mousa as the tripoint between Ethiopia, Eritrea and Djibouti is not the result of an agreement between the three countries. In December 1948 the British administering Eritrea refused to attend a meeting with the other two parties to determine the exact location of their tripoint, set in a 1908 treaty as 60 km inland from the Red Sea. British administration of Eritrea ended in 1952, and with increasing Ethiopian administration over the ensuing decade, and incorporation into Ethiopia from 1962 to 1993, the boundary was internal, not international. In 2002, the Eritrea-Ethiopia Boundary Commission established the tri-point at the Mousa Ali summit; Ethiopia had pressed for it to be further east, nearer to Dadda'to, Djibouti.

== Climate ==
The temperature of Mousa Ali usually ranges from 7 °C to 17 °C in December and January, and 16 °C to 26 °C from June to September. The weather on the mountain can be very erratic, sometimes severe.

Climate data for Mousa Ali
Month	Jan	Feb	Mar	Apr	May	Jun	Jul	Aug	Sep	Oct	Nov	Dec	Year
Mean daily maximum °C (°F)	17.9 (64.3)	20.4 (68.8)	20.4 (68.8)	22.7 (72.8)	23.7 (74.6)	24.7 (76.4)	26.3 (79.3)	25.8 (78.4)	24.1 (75.3)	23.2 (73.7)	20.6 (69.0)	18.3 (64.9)	22.3 (72.2)
Mean daily minimum °C (°F)	7.9 (46.3)	8.4 (47.1)	9.9 (49.8)	11.8 (53.2)	13.7 (56.6)	15.2 (59.3)	16.9 (62.5)	16.6 (61.8)	15.2 (59.3)	12.7 (54.8)	10.4 (50.7)	8.9 (48.0)	12.3 (54.1)
Average rainfall mm (inches)	5 (0.2)	6 (0.2)	11 (0.4)	34 (1.3)	39 (1.5)	6 (0.2)	6 (0.2)	53 (2.1)	47 (1.9)	13 (0.5)	9 (0.4)	13 (0.5)	242 (9.4)
Source: Climate Data

== Gallery ==
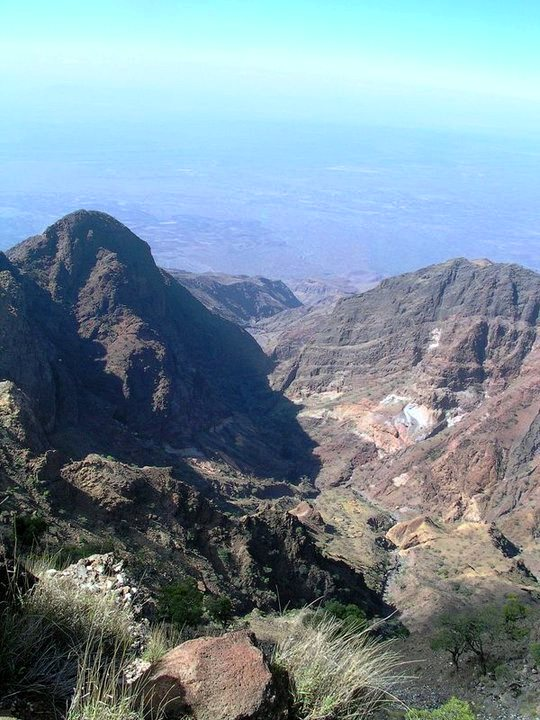
On the summit of Moussa Ali looking at the Caldera.

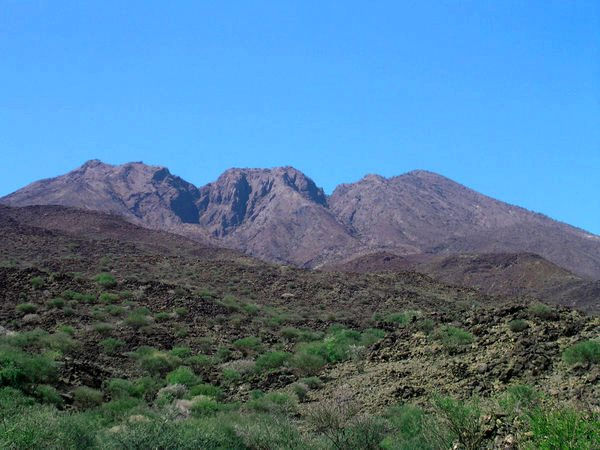
View of Mousa Ali from the southwest side.

== See also ==
- List of volcanoes in Eritrea
- List of stratovolcanoes
- List of Ultras of Africa
