= Oued Ouea =

Oued Ouea وادي أويعا
- Town
- Location in Djibouti
- Coordinates: 11°41′22″N 42°41′12″E
- Country: Djibouti
- Region: Tadjourah
- Elevation: 354 m (1,161 ft)

Oued Ouea (Arabic: وادي أويا) (alternative names: Ouêʽa, Wêʽa) is a town in the Tadjourah region of Djibouti.
