= Airolaf =

Airolaf إيرولاف
- Town
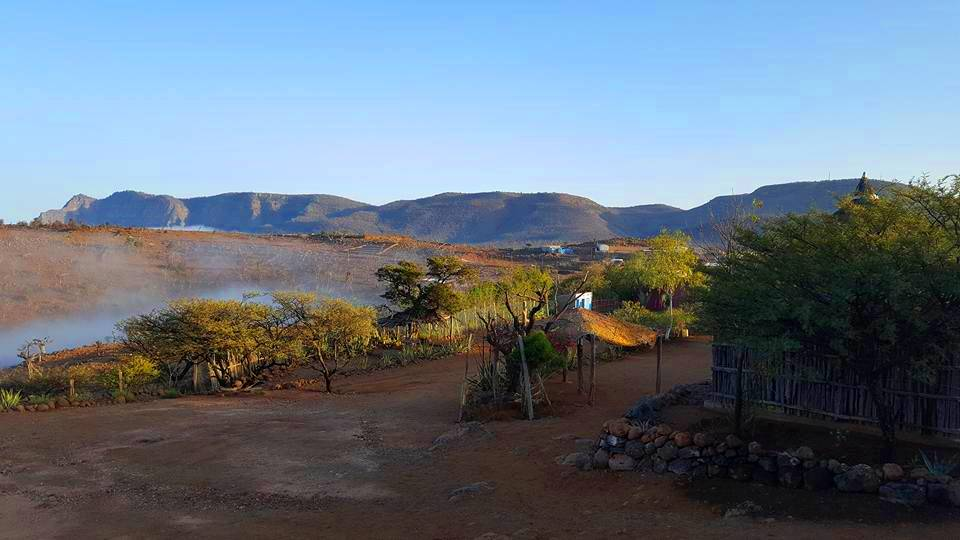
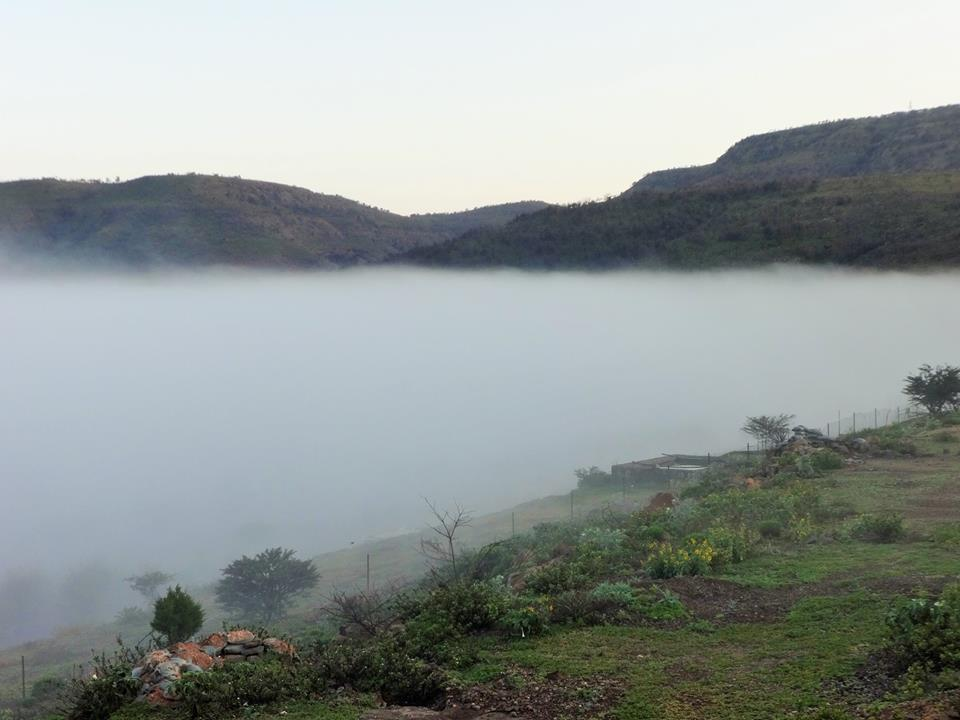
- Near the Day Forest National Park.

- Location in Djibouti
- Coordinates: 11°46′N 42°39′E
- Country: Djibouti
- Region: Tadjoura
- Elevation: 1,535 m (5,036 ft)

Population 2012
  - Total: 1,023

Airolaf (Arabic: إيرولاف) is a town in the Tadjoura Region in northwestern Djibouti and in the centre of the Tadjoura Region. It is located some 115 kilometres northwest of the national capital, Djibouti City. Airolaf is known for its temperate, cool climate – the coolest area in Djibouti. The town is overlooked by Goda Mountains, the third tallest mountain in Djibouti. One of the distinctive features of Airolaf countryside is the widespread growing of vegetables.

== Demographics ==
The majority of the population of Airolaf is Afars.

== Geography and climate ==
Airolaf has a Steppe climate (BSh) in Köppen-Geiger system. It sits on middle trending highlands known as the Goda Mountains. In the winter months it is quite cold at night, and there can even be frost. However, it rapidly warms up as the tropical sun climbs higher during the day. The temperate central portion, where Airolaf lies, is situated on a rocky plateau. The Goda Mountains have a mixture of highland climate zones, with temperature differences of up to 10 °C, depending on elevation and prevailing wind patterns. The highest recorded temperature was 38 °C (100 °F) on July 20, 1999, while the lowest recorded temperature was 6 °C (43 °F) on December 31, 1989.

Climate data for Airolaf
Month	Jan	Feb	Mar	Apr	May	Jun	Jul	Aug	Sep	Oct	Nov	Dec	Year
Mean daily maximum °C (°F)	24.1 (75.4)	24.4 (75.9)	25.1 (77.2)	26.2 (79.2)	27.4 (81.3)	29.8 (85.6)	30.9 (87.6)	30.5 (86.9)	29.2 (84.6)	26.7 (80.1)	25.3 (77.5)	24.0 (75.2)	27.0 (80.5)
Daily mean °C (°F)	14.5 (58.1)	15.2 (59.4)	17.0 (62.6)	19.1 (66.4)	21.7 (71.1)	23.5 (74.3)	24.3 (75.7)	23.2 (73.8)	20.6 (69.1)	17.1 (62.8)	14.9 (58.8)	14.5 (58.1)	18.8 (65.9)
Mean daily minimum °C (°F)	9.3 (48.7)	10.3 (50.5)	11.6 (52.8)	13.2 (55.7)	14.8 (58.6)	17.1 (62.7)	18.9 (66.0)	18.4 (65.1)	16.7 (62.0)	13.4 (56.1)	10.9 (51.6)	9.4 (48.9)	13.7 (56.6)
Average precipitation mm (inches)	34 (1.3)	37 (1.5)	33 (1.3)	45 (1.8)	24 (0.9)	13 (0.5)	49 (1.9)	70 (2.8)	56 (2.2)	16 (0.6)	32 (1.3)	22 (0.9)	431 (17)
Source: Climate-Data.org
