= Bankouale =

Bankouale بنكوالي
- Town
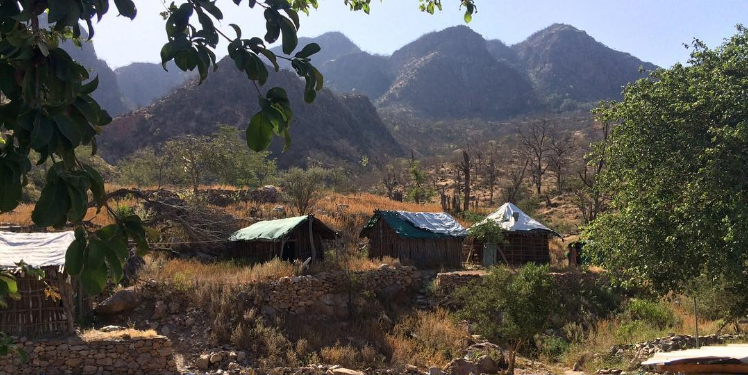

- Location in Djibouti
- Coordinates: 11°49′N 42°40′E
- Country: Djibouti
- Region: Tadjoura
- Elevation: 640 m (2,100 ft)

Bankouale (Arabic: بنكوالي) is a town in Tadjoura region of Djibouti. One of the distinctive features of Bankouale countryside is the widespread growing of vegetables. In the meantime there are also first approaches to establish gentle tourism.

== Climate ==
Bankouale has a hot arid climate (BWh) by the Köppen-Geiger system.

Climate data for Bankouale
Month	Jan	Feb	Mar	Apr	May	Jun	Jul	Aug	Sep	Oct	Nov	Dec	Year
Mean daily maximum °C (°F)	25.0 (77.0)	25.2 (77.4)	27.2 (81.0)	29.4 (84.9)	32.9 (91.2)	36.5 (97.7)	36.9 (98.4)	35.9 (96.6)	34.0 (93.2)	30.1 (86.2)	27.2 (81.0)	25.5 (77.9)	30.5 (86.9)
Mean daily minimum °C (°F)	16.0 (60.8)	17.0 (62.6)	18.3 (64.9)	20.5 (68.9)	23.2 (73.8)	26.5 (79.7)	25.6 (78.1)	25.0 (77.0)	25.0 (77.0)	20.6 (69.1)	18.1 (64.6)	16.7 (62.1)	21.0 (69.9)
Average rainfall mm (inches)	30 (1.2)	27 (1.1)	18 (0.7)	25 (1.0)	10 (0.4)	4 (0.2)	16 (0.6)	30 (1.2)	29 (1.1)	11 (0.4)	38 (1.5)	23 (0.9)	261 (10.3)
Source: Climate-Data.org, altitude: 640 metres or 2,100 feet
