= Eunidia breuningiae =

Scientific classification
- Kingdom: Animalia
- Phylum: Arthropoda
- Clade: Pancrustacea
- Class: Insecta
- Order: Coleoptera
- Suborder: Polyphaga
- Infraorder: Cucujiformia
- Family: Cerambycidae
- Genus: Eunidia
- Species: E. breuningiae

Binomial name
- Eunidia breuningiae Villiers, 1951

Synonyms
- Eunidia djiboutiana Breuning, 1974; Eunidia naviauxi Villiers, 1977; Eunidia renaudi Breuning, 1961; Eunidia submarmorata Breuning, 1968

Species of beetle

Eunidia breuningiae is a species of beetle in the family Cerambycidae. It was described by Villiers in 1951. It is known from Egypt, Senegal, Niger, Oman, Yemen, Djibouti, Saudi Arabia, and Chad.
