= Day Forest National Park =

National park in Djibouti

- IUCN category II (national park)
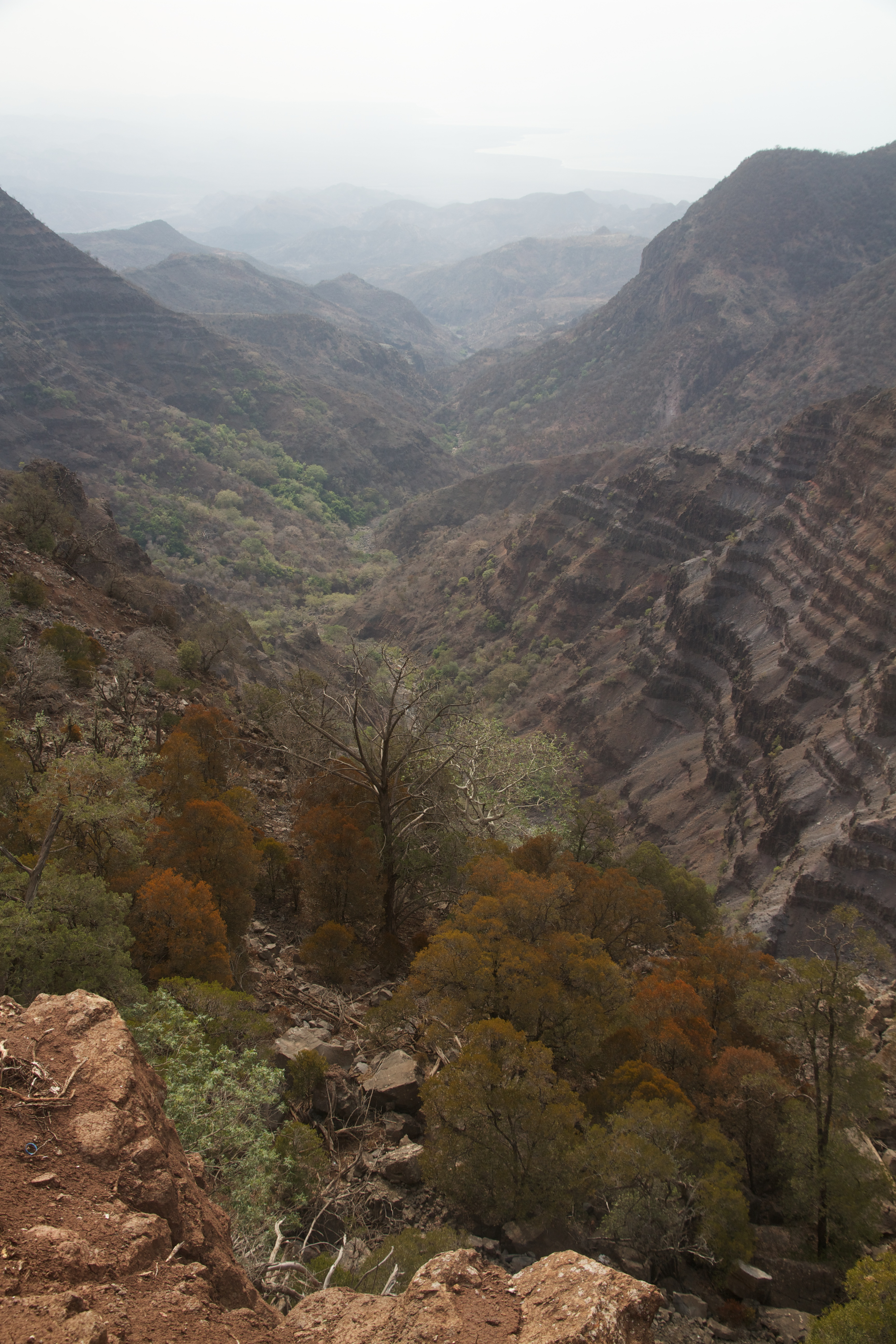
- Day Forest National Park in the Goda Mountains

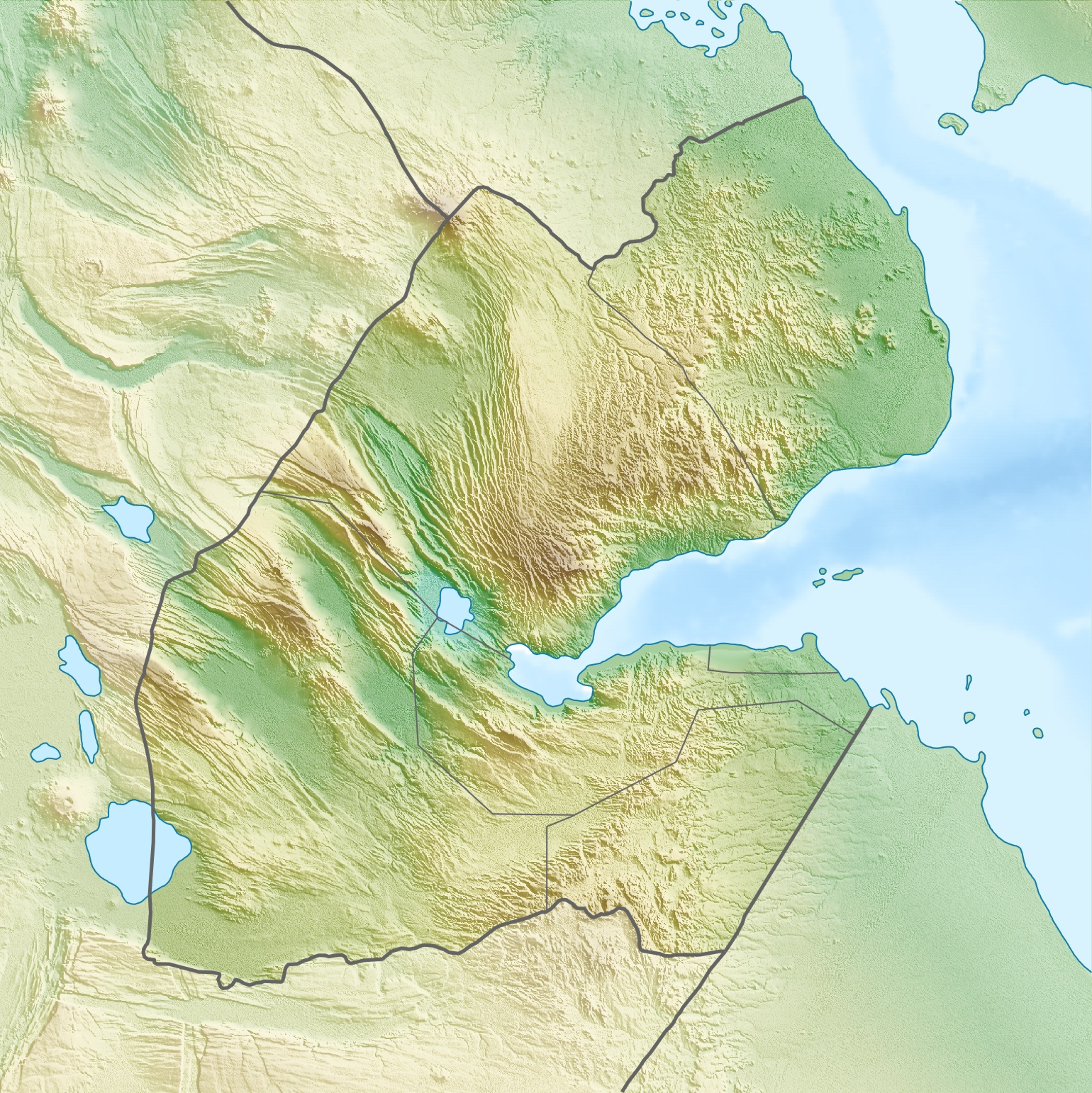
- Location within Djibouti
- Location: Tadjourah Region; Djibouti
- Nearest city: Tadjoura
- Coordinates: 11°48′N 42°41′E
- Area: 15 km^{2} (5.8 sq mi)
- Established: 1939

Day Forest National Park, also known as Forêt du Day National Park, is a national park in the Goda Mountains and Tadjourah Region of Djibouti. The region is one of the very few forested areas of Djibouti, which taken as a whole is one of the least forested countries on Earth. It is the wettest part of Djibouti, receiving some 500 millimetres (19 in) of precipitation annually.

== Flora ==
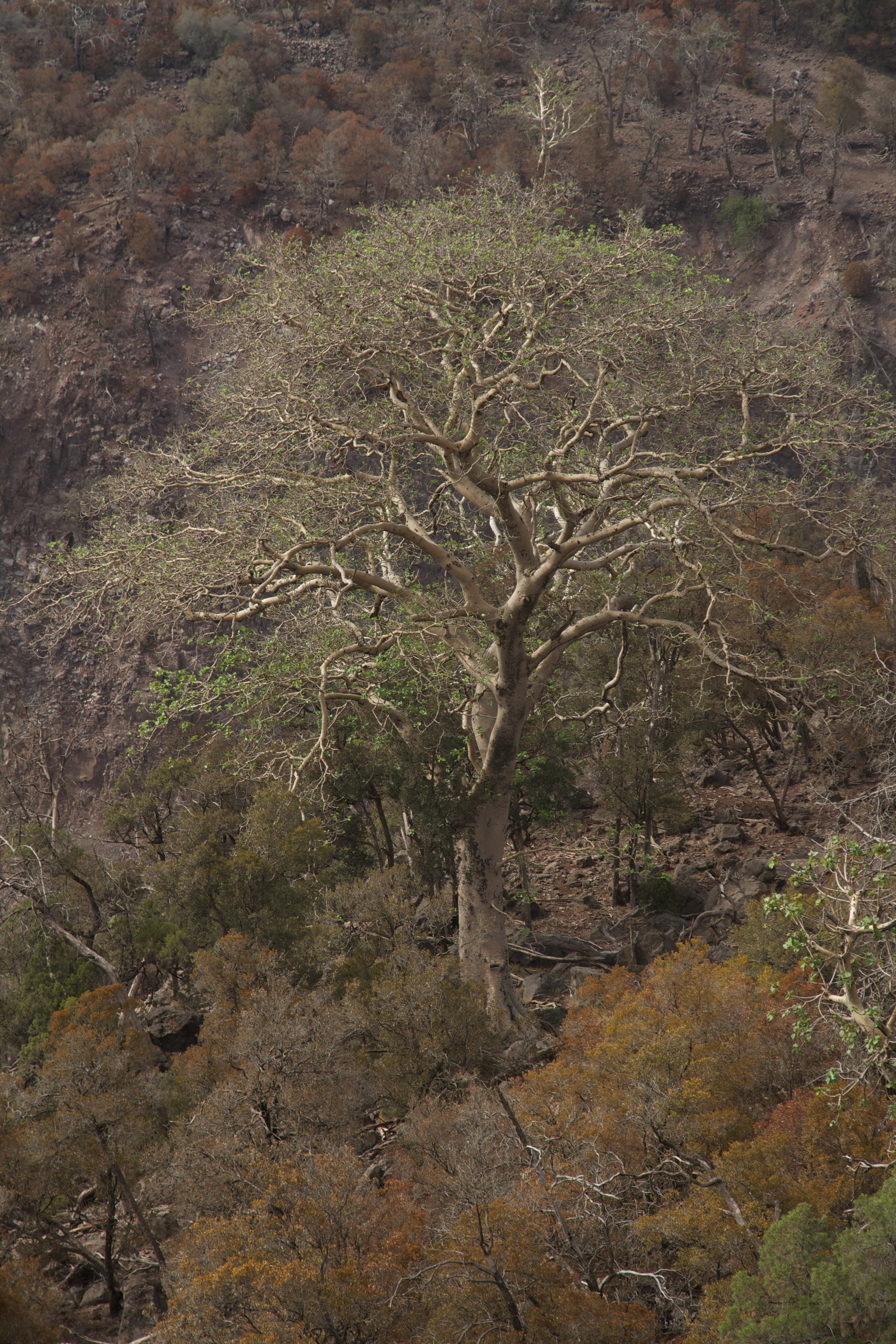
Flora of the Day Forest National Park

Along with Mount Mabla, the Forêt du Day National Park is one of Djibouti's two remaining areas of closed−protected forests. It protects an important forest island in a sea of semi-desert.

It has four dominant tree species: Juniperus procera, Olea europaea subsp. cuspidata, Buxus hildebrandtii, and Tarchonanthus camphoratus. Doum palms are found in the western part of the plain of Hanle, at the foot of Gamarré on the edge of the plain of Gagadé. The vegetation becomes more abundant with elevation. Thus the set of Day and its extension to the crest of Goda are occupied by an ancient juniper forest, Ficus, Mimosa, wild olive trees, boxwood, dragon trees, and other native plants.

This is the largest forest in Djibouti. The forest has a total area of approximately 5,900 hectares (14,500 acres). The most valuable part of national park is a 900 hectares (2,223 acres) stand of East African junipers (Juniperus procera) which grows in the heights above 950 m. Junipers here may grow to 20 m tall, but many trees have died off in recent decades, while the boxwood Buxus hildebrandtii is expanding in their stead.

== Fauna ==
Notable animals found here include the Djibouti spurfowl (Pternistis ochropectus), a population of green-winged pytilia that may actually be a distinct species or subspecies (Pytilia (melba) flavicaudata), as well as the mysterious and undescribed Tôha sunbird—Djibouti sunbird (Chalcomitra sp. indet.). All of these birds do not occur outside of, and are endemic to, Djibouti, and except for the Francolin, they have only ever been found within Day Forest.

More widespread birds inhabiting the forest are Gambaga flycatcher (Muscicapa gambagae), Somali bulbul (Pycnonotus (barbatus) somaliensis) and Somali starling (Onychognathus blythii).

The rare colubrid snake Platyceps afarensis is also found here.

== Conservation ==
The forest as a whole has been under long-term environmental threat. 88% of the Day Forest has been lost over the last two centuries, and more than 20% of the loss has occurred during the last 50 years.
