= Dorra =

Dorra درة
- Town
- Location in Djibouti
- Coordinates: 12°09′N 42°29′E
- Country: Djibouti
- Region: Tadjoura
- Elevation: 294 m (965 ft)

Population (2024 census)
  - Total: 1,021

Dorra (Arabic: درة) is a village in Djibouti in the mid-north of Tadjoura Region, the largest region. It is located about 237 kilometers north-west of Djibouti City and 65 km (40 mi) south of the border with Eritrea and east of the border with Ethiopia. At Dorra rock paintings have been found.

== Climate ==
The average annual temperature in Dorra is 29.1 °C or 84.4 °F. About 165 millimetres or 6.50 inches of precipitation falls annually. The driest month is June with 4 millimetres or 0.16 inches, and nine months of the year tend to be virtually rainless, with on average no more than 13 millimetres or 0.51 inches of rain per month. Average precipitation in August, accounting for years when the rains in this area arrive or do not arrive, is 30 millimetres or 1.18 inches – the three months when typically quantities of rain supporting grassland means there is significant herding in this eastern extreme of a huge escarpment reaching beyond the border and rising to the central parts of the Ethiopian Highlands.

Dorra has a hot arid climate (BWh) in the Köppen-Geiger system.

Climate data for Dorra
Month	Jan	Feb	Mar	Apr	May	Jun	Jul	Aug	Sep	Oct	Nov	Dec	Year
Mean daily maximum °C (°F)	27.0 (80.6)	28.6 (83.5)	30.6 (87.1)	32.6 (90.7)	35.7 (96.3)	38.9 (102.0)	39.5 (103.1)	38.6 (101.5)	36.7 (98.1)	33.3 (91.9)	30.5 (86.9)	28.6 (83.5)	33.4 (92.1)
Mean daily minimum °C (°F)	19.0 (66.2)	20.5 (68.9)	22.4 (72.3)	24.1 (75.4)	26.6 (79.9)	29.5 (85.1)	28.7 (83.7)	28.2 (82.8)	28.3 (82.9)	23.5 (74.3)	20.9 (69.6)	19.5 (67.1)	24.3 (75.7)
Average rainfall mm (inches)	3 (0.1)	8 (0.3)	11 (0.4)	15 (0.6)	12 (0.5)	6 (0.2)	29 (1.1)	35 (1.4)	23 (0.9)	9 (0.4)	10 (0.4)	4 (0.2)	165 (6.5)
Source 1: Climate-Data.org, altitude: 276m
Source 2: Levoyageur
