= Goda Mountains =

Mountain range in Djibouti

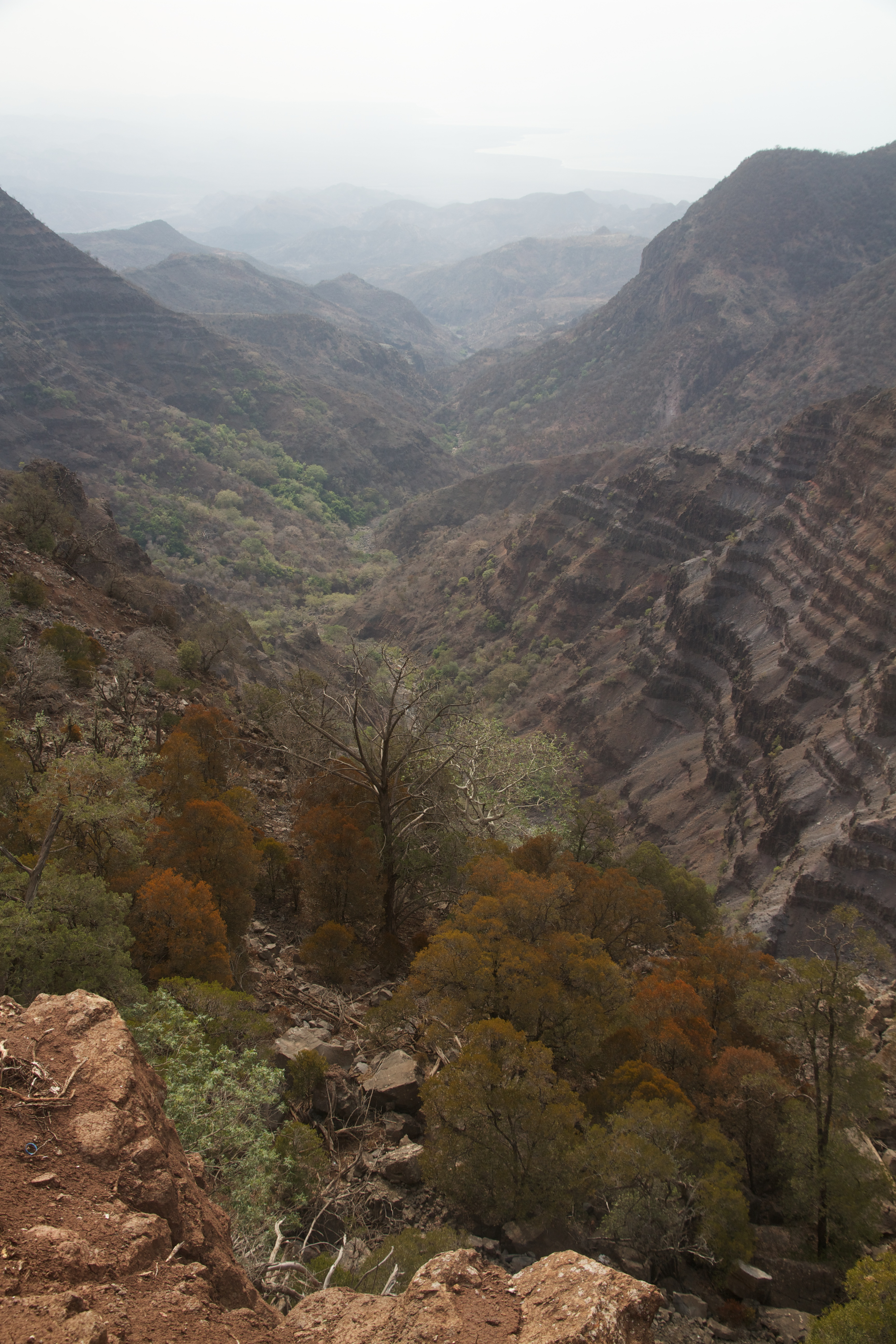
- Day Forest National Park in the Goda Mountains

Highest point
- Elevation: 1,783 m (5,850 ft)at Abeyda
- Coordinates: 11.86°N 42.79°E

Dimensions
- Length: 24 km (15 mi)
- Width: 31 km (19 mi)
- Area: 901 km^{2} (348 mi^{2})

Geography
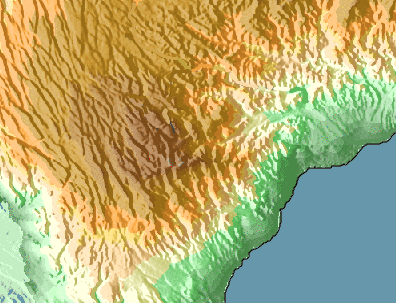
- Country: Djibouti
- Region: Tadjourah Region

The Goda Mountains lie northwest of the Gulf of Tadjoura, Tadjoura Region in Djibouti. They rise to 1,750 metres (5,740 ft) above sea level and are the nation's largest heavily vegetated area and is the second highest point in Djibouti. The name Goda in Afar means "twisted" or "devoured" and refers to a ridge. A part of the mountains is protected within the Day Forest National Park, Djibouti's first national park. The ecology of this landform is considered an isolated outlier of the Ethiopian montane grasslands and woodlands ecoregion, an important island of forest in a sea of semi-desert.

== Ecology ==
The Goda Mountains and the nearby Mabla Mountains are the last remaining refuge for the Djibouti spurfowl. It is also one of the few remaining habitats of the East African juniper, which was once the dominant tree species of the forest. The population of juniper trees in the area has sharply declined, with approximately 50% of the trees dying even in the healthiest regions. Instead, boxwood has become more common. Subsequently, the antelope population is seeing a rapid decline, desert warthogs have all but disappeared, and leopards have not been sighted since the 1980s. Climate change is one of the main factors contributing to this loss of species. The Goda Mountains continue to see longer periods of heat and drought in the region, compounded by grazing (especially of seedlings) and trampling by cattle. Hunting and the cutting of trees also play a subordinate role.

The inhabitants of the nine surrounding villages consists of five different clans of the Afar. Once a nomadic population, they now mostly lead sedentary lifestyles. Their pastoral livelihoods are highly dependent on the regularity of rainfall. In 2003, wells with pumps were introduced to the village to ensure a consistent, though limited water supply. The cutting of live trees for firewood is traditionally prohibited; thus only dead wood may be used. Drought is largely held responsible for the forest degradation, with only 4% attributing this to cattle grazing. With the initiative of the local organization Djibouti Nature, residents have built stone walls and fences out of dead wood to help protect areas of the forest from cattle. This initiative has had a visible, positive impact on the condition of the forest. According to the same survey, nearly a quarter of the residents believe that nothing can be done about the damage to the forest, 15% are unsure, 23% believe the wooden fences would further the preservation of the forest, 8% suggest the planting of trees, and 29% believe in a combination of both tree planting and fencing. The establishment of a tree nursery in the village Day is just one of the efforts the organization has made to help combat the further depletion of the forest.

== Climate ==
The climate of Goda Mountains is a subtropical highland climate (Köppen climate classification: Cwb), with the influence of mountain climate, with hot and dry summers and cold winters. This is attributed to the fact that Goda Mountains is located on a plain surrounded by mountains and to its distance to the sea and its effects. In the presence of fog, condensation is sometimes considerable. Ground moisture allows plants and trees to survive despite irregular rainfall. Elevation is the major factor affecting temperature levels, with the higher elevated areas being on average 11 °C (52 °F) cooler than the lower areas. Overnight temperatures can drop as low as 50–54 °F (10–12 °C), especially during the December to March winter months.

Climate data for Goda Mountains
Month	Jan	Feb	Mar	Apr	May	Jun	Jul	Aug	Sep	Oct	Nov	Dec	Year
Mean daily maximum °C (°F)	24.1 (75.4)	24.4 (75.9)	25.1 (77.2)	26.2 (79.2)	27.4 (81.3)	29.8 (85.6)	30.9 (87.6)	30.5 (86.9)	29.2 (84.6)	26.7 (80.1)	25.3 (77.5)	24.0 (75.2)	27.0 (80.5)
Mean daily minimum °C (°F)	9.3 (48.7)	10.3 (50.5)	11.6 (52.8)	13.2 (55.7)	14.8 (58.6)	17.1 (62.7)	18.9 (66.0)	18.4 (65.1)	16.7 (62.0)	13.4 (56.1)	10.9 (51.6)	9.4 (48.9)	13.7 (56.6)
Average precipitation mm (inches)	35 (1.4)	37 (1.5)	33 (1.3)	45 (1.8)	24 (0.9)	13 (0.5)	50 (2.0)	70 (2.8)	57 (2.2)	16 (0.6)	32 (1.3)	22 (0.9)	434 (17.2)
Source: Climate-Data.org
