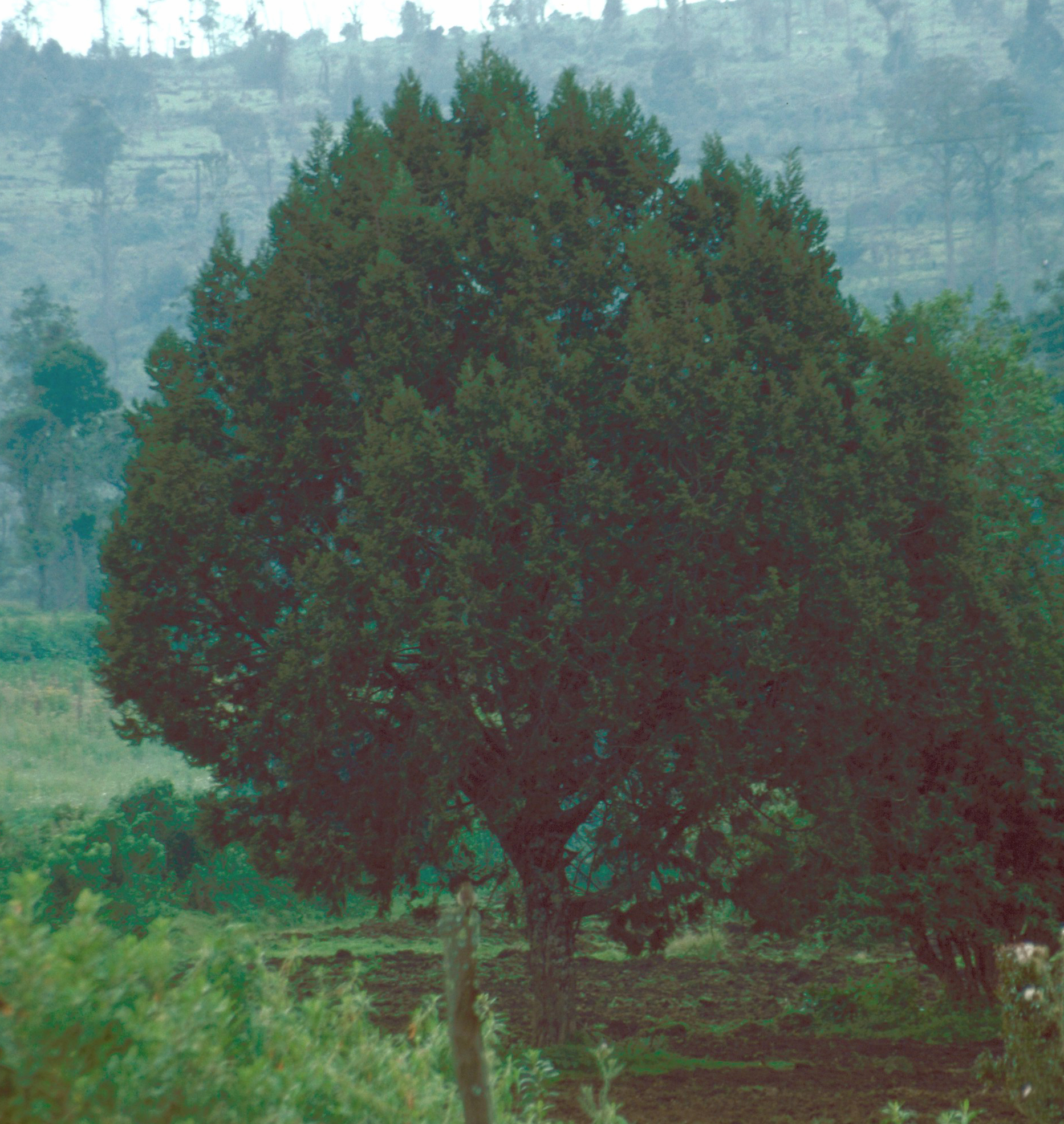

Conservation status
- Least Concern (IUCN 3.1)

Scientific classification
- Kingdom: Plantae
- Clade: Embryophytes
- Clade: Tracheophytes
- Clade: Spermatophytes
- Clade: Gymnosperms
- Division: Pinophyta
- Class: Pinopsida
- Order: Cupressales
- Family: Cupressaceae
- Genus: Juniperus
- Section: Juniperus sect. Sabina
- Species: J. procera

Binomial name
- Juniperus procera Hochst. ex Endl.

Synonyms
- Juniperus abyssinica K.Koch; J. hochstetteri Antoine; Sabina procera (Hochst. ex Endl.) Antoine

= Juniperus procera =

Species of conifer

Juniperus procera (known by the common English names African juniper, African pencil-cedar, East African juniper, East African cedar, and Kenya cedar) is a coniferous tree native to mountainous areas in Africa and the Arabian Peninsula. It is a characteristic tree of the Afromontane flora.

== Description ==
Juniperus procera is a medium-sized tree reaching 20–25 metres (66–82 feet) (rarely 40 m or 130 ft) tall, with a trunk up to 1.5–2 m (5–6 1/2 ft) diameter and a broadly conical to rounded or irregular crown. The leaves are of two forms, juvenile needle-like leaves 8–15 millimetres (3/8–5/8 in) long on seedlings, and adult scale-leaves 0.5–3 mm long on older plants, arranged in decussate pairs or whorls of three. It is largely dioecious with separate male and female plants, but some individual plants produce both sexes. The cones are berry-like, 4–8 mm in diameter, blue-black with a whitish waxy bloom, and contain 2–5 seeds; they mature in 12–18 months. The male cones are 3–5 mm long, and shed their pollen in early spring.

== Distribution ==
Juniperus procera is native to the Arabian Peninsula (in Saudi Arabia and Yemen), and northeastern, eastern, west-central, and south tropical Africa (in the Democratic Republic of the Congo, the Republic of the Congo, Djibouti, Eritrea, Ethiopia, Kenya, Malawi, Mozambique, Somalia, Sudan, Tanzania, Uganda, Zambia, and Zimbabwe).

It is the only juniper to occur south of the equator, and is thought to be a relatively recent colonist of Africa; the species shows very little of the variability associated with a long period of evolution. It is closely related to Juniperus excelsa from southwestern Asia, probably deriving from a common ancestor with that species in southwestern Asia.

== Taxonomy ==
According to Tropicos, Juniperus procera was originally described and published in Synopsis Coniferarum 1847. The type specimen was collected from Ethiopia, by "Schimper" (possibly Wilhelm Philipp Schimper, but there were other contemporary collectors with this surname).

== Uses ==
It is an important timber tree, used for building houses, poles, and furniture. The bark is used for beehives.

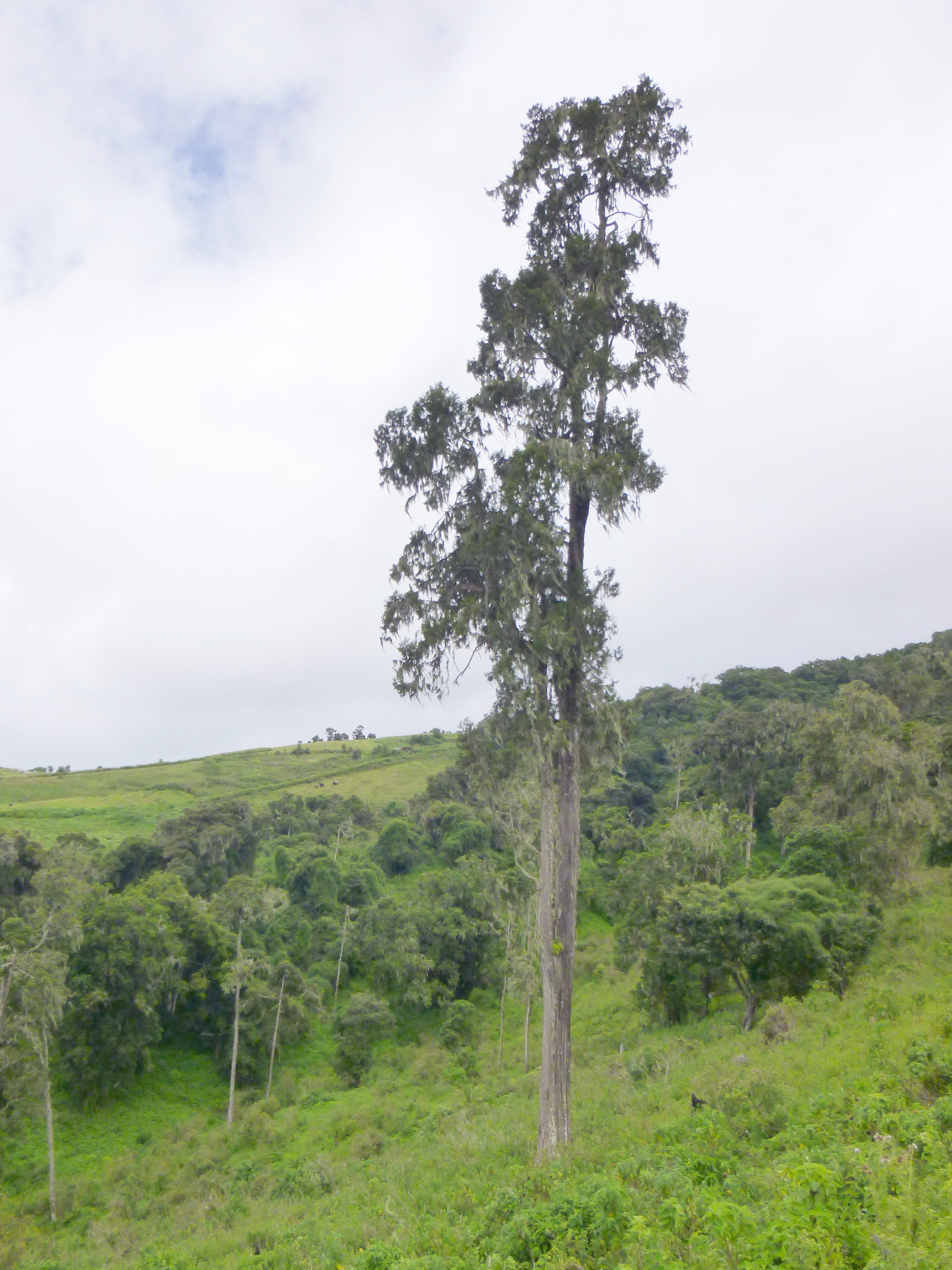
East African juniper, northern Tanzania

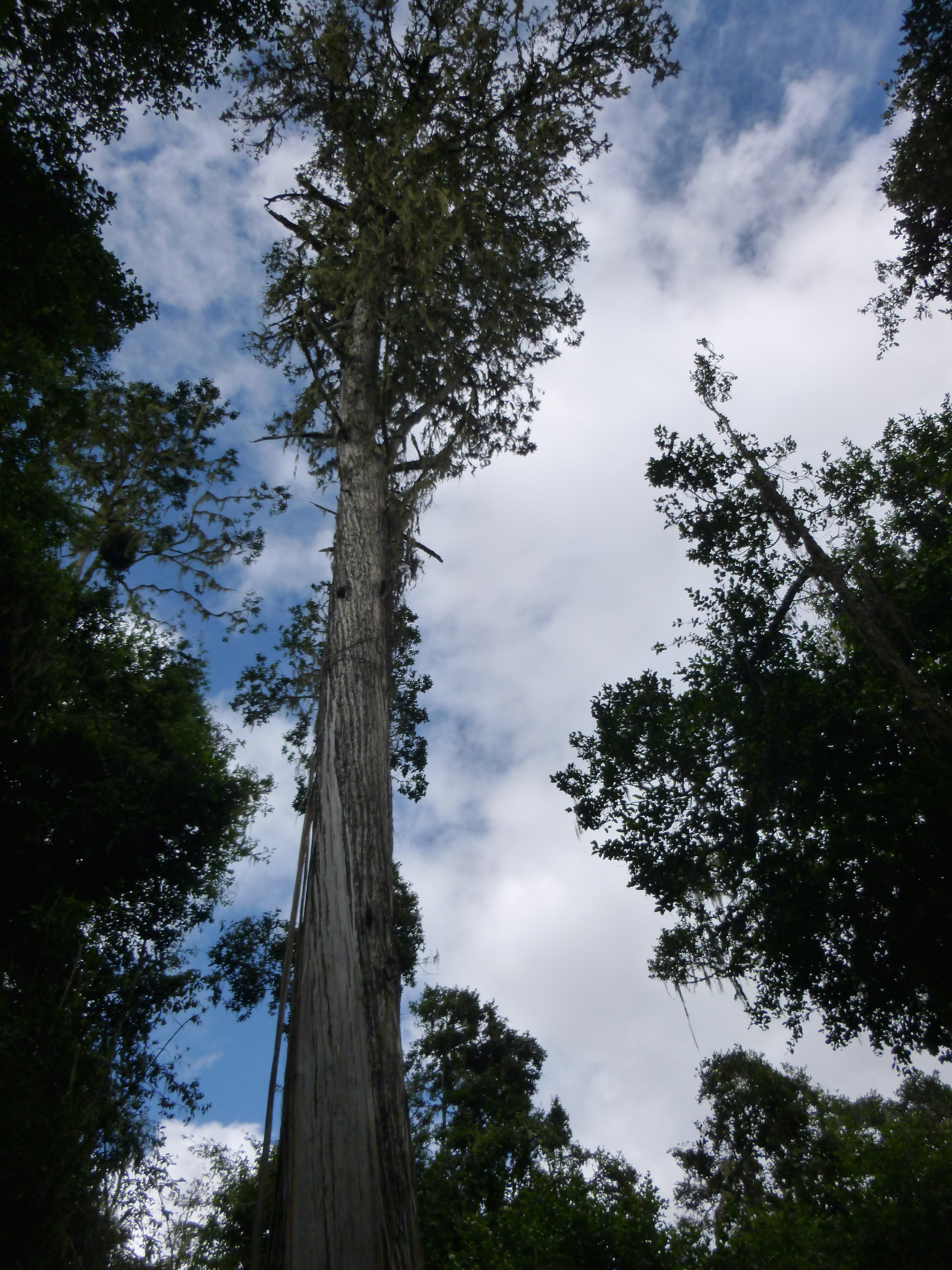
East African juniper, northern Tanzania

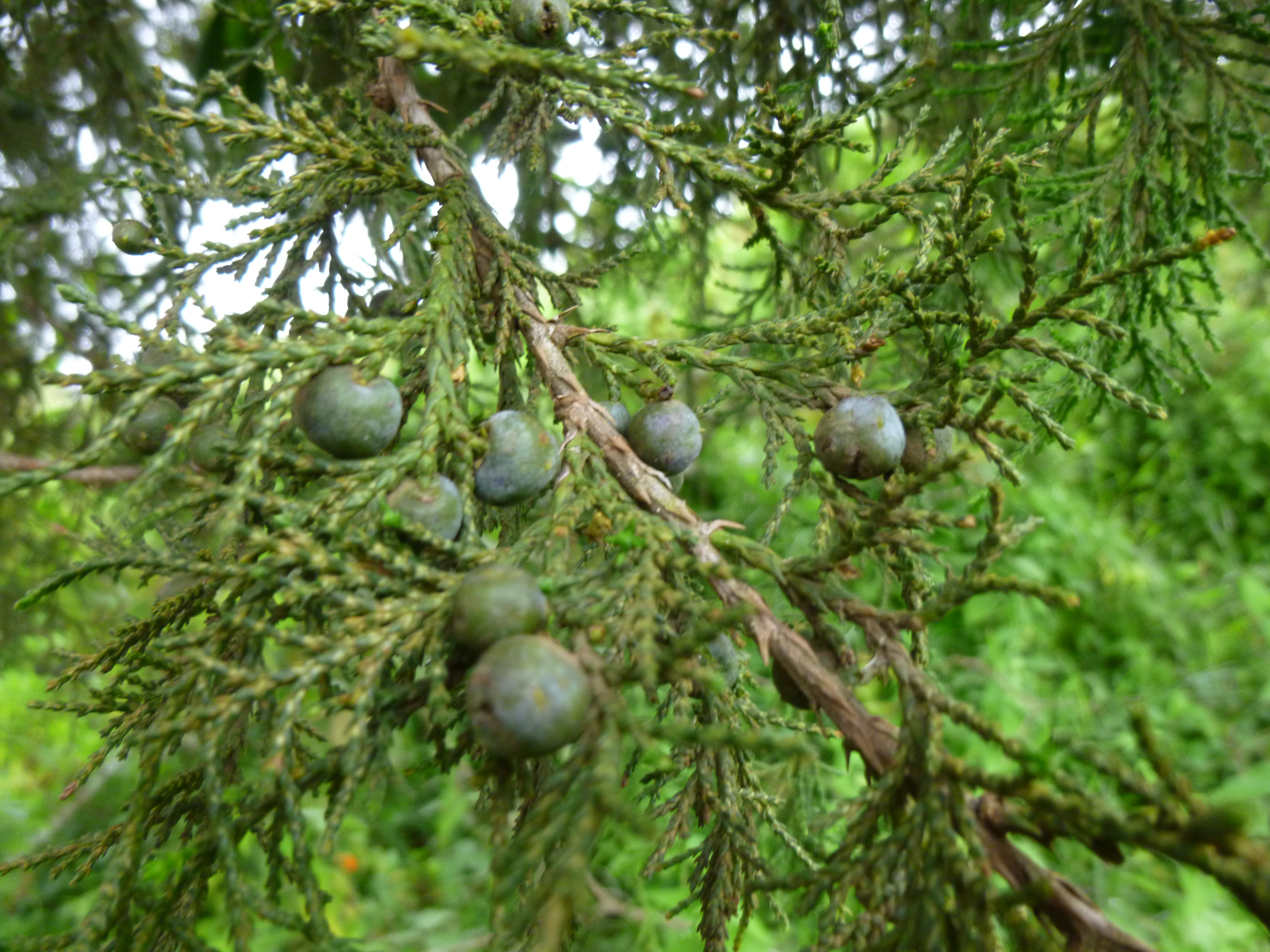
East African juniper, northern Tanzania

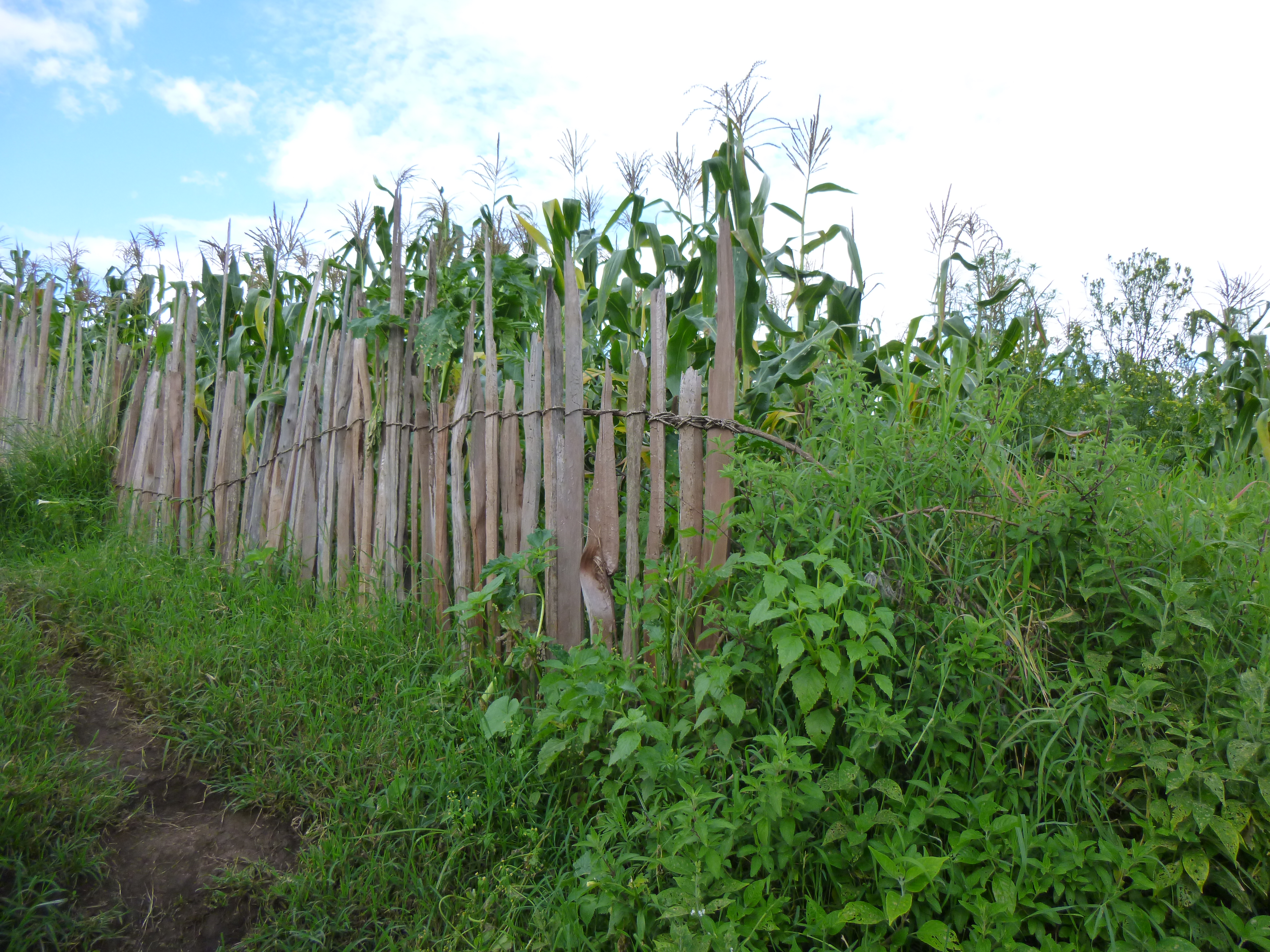
East African juniper, used as termite resistant fence stakes
