= Tadjourah Region =

Region of Djibouti

Tadjourah Region Rakaakay Tagórri Gobolka Tajoora
- Region (Gobolka - Rakaakay)
- Coordinates: 11°47′N 42°54′E
- Country: Djibouti
- Administrative centre: Tadjourah

Area
  - Total: 7,100 km^{2} (2,700 sq mi)

Population (2024 census)
  - Total: 60,645
  - Density: 8.5/km^{2} (22/sq mi)
- ISO 3166 code: DJ-TA

The Tadjourah Region (Somali: Gobolka Tajoora, Afar: Rakaakay Tagórri) is a region in north-central Djibouti, the largest of its six regions. With its capital at Tadjourah, it has an area of 7,100 square kilometres (2,700 mi^{2}). It lies along the Gulf of Tadjoura, and the coastal city of Tadjoura. The region has active salt and fisheries industries, and is served by the Tadjoura Airport. In total area, it is larger than Brunei and smaller than Cyprus.

== History ==
The boundaries of the present-day Djibouti nation state were established during the Scramble for Africa. The first French establishment in the Horn of Africa, and in 1884 they sign a treaty with the Afar. The poet Arthur Rimbaud became a trader, and lived in Tadjoura from 1885 to 1886. He was the owner of a particular ship carrying weapons to be sold to the King of Shoa, cousin of the father of future Ethiopian Emperor Haile Selassie. In 1883 the French Somaliland (French: Côte française des Somalis) was officially founded.

== Overview ==
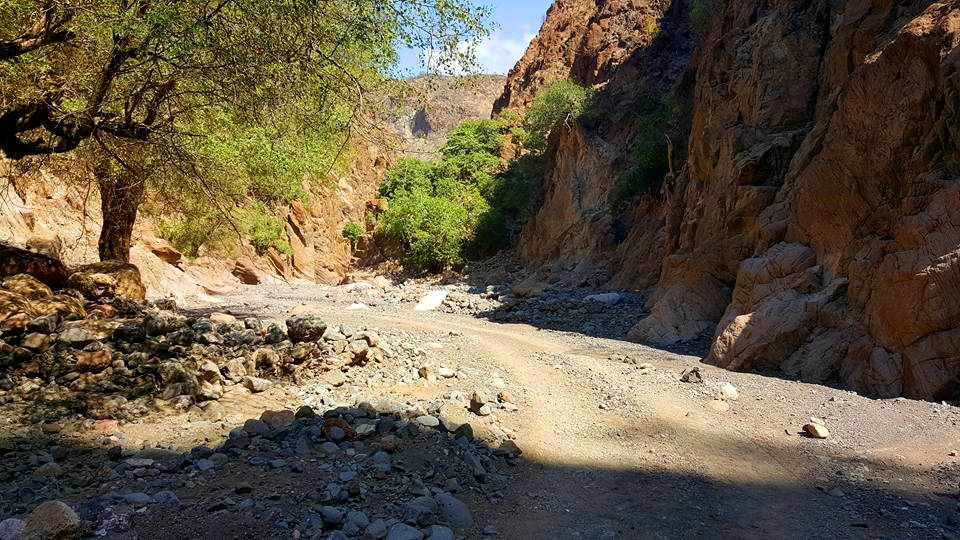
Valley in the Goda Mountains.

The region is the largest of the country's 'six' (one of which is sometimes termed a city instead of a region, the country's eponymous capital with the bulk of the country's population, Djibouti City). A mixture of semi-desert mountains and desert, the region is 35.5 times larger than the capital's area and has a population nine times smaller. The region is bordered by Eritrea to the north, Ethiopia to the northwest, the Obock Region to the northeast, the Dikhil and Arta regions and Lake Asal to the south, and the Gulf of Tadjourah to the southeast.

The capital of the Tadjourah Region is Tadjourah city. Mousa Ali, the highest point in Djibouti is in the northern part. Tadjourah City is one of two ports in the northern part of the country. Administrative and customary center Tadjourah is also an important trading center. The small city also plays an important role in the political stability of Djibouti. The main towns are: Sagallou, Dorra Bankoualé, Randa, Adailou, Garbannab, Guirori, Kalaf, Assa-Gueyla, Balho, Bouyya, Mouddo, The Day and Ambado. Besides its deep religious tradition with its seven mosques it has far-reaching panoramas.

Due to its many whitewashed buildings and structures, Tadjourah is known as the White City. Most people in the wider region are involved in marine commerce, including a large number of fishermen. The region has sandy beaches, tourism and trade. It exports salts from deposits around Lake Assal, one of the country's main natural resources. Tadjourah will soon have a modern port, complementary to that of Djibouti City and the fisheries industry is growing. The western half of it is steep valleys and high escarpments. Almost 65% of its area can be considered agricultural to the extent of seasonal grazing in many years and a minority of land in the wettest areas such as the south-western highlands near Randa near the south support year-round grazing and subsistence crop agriculture for a few months of the year, being mild and semi-arid. For air transportation, the Tadjourah Region is served by the Tadjoura Airport.

According to the 2009 Census, the local population consists of 89,567 individuals, 48,402 of whom are nomads.

=== Day Forest ===
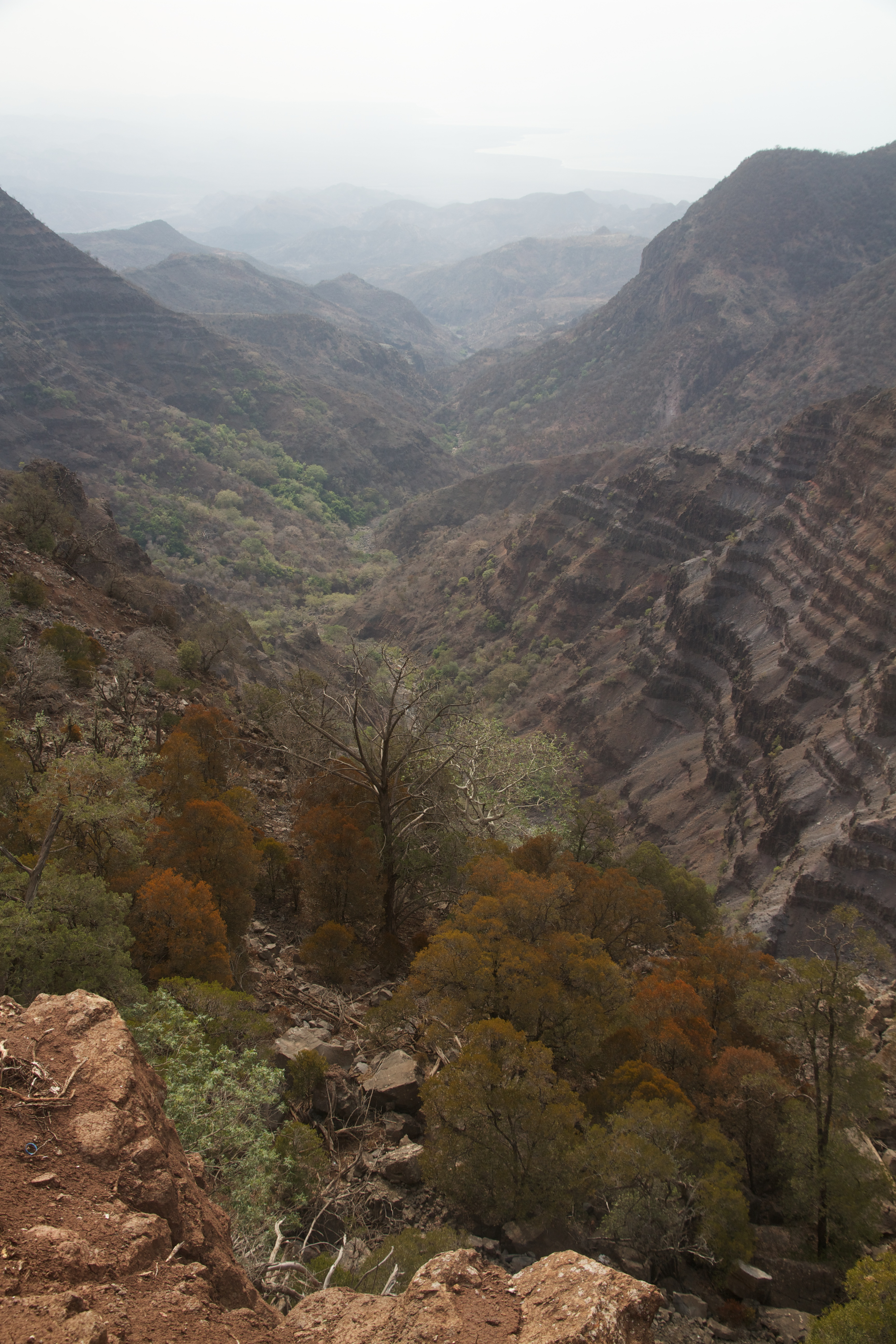
Day Forest National Park in the Goda Mountains

The region has the roughly circular Day Forest National Park in many, often precipitous valleys of the Goda Mountains which is set back from the coastal RN9 route from Tadjourah City to the west. This it the main road of the region, providing a circuitous, up and down route to the capital city compared to the sea route which is approximately a fifth of the distance. It also provides the only proper road of the region into Ethiopia. This is the largest forest in the country, a semi-arid surrounded by semi-desert, with four dominant species: Juniperus procera, Olea africana, Buxus hildebrandtii, and Tarchonanthus camphoratus.

== Climate ==
Elevations play a major factor in temperature, with the escarpments and plateaus on average 11 °C (52 °F) cooler, day or night. The climate of the coastal strip is influenced by warm ocean waters, keeping the closest parts free from extremes highs and providing occasional rainfall. The overnight lows in the highlands - the western half of the region - drop to about 50–59 °F (10–15 °C).

The annual mean statistics for some Tadjoura Region centres is shown below:

Town	Min. Temp	Max. Temp	Rainfall
Tadjoura	22.2 °C (72.0 °F)	41.7 °C (107.1 °F)	186 mm (7.3 in)
Adailou	13.7 °C (56.7 °F)	34.4 °C (93.9 °F)	322 mm (12.7 in)
Randa	13.7 °C (56.7 °F)	34.7 °C (94.5 °F)	325 mm (12.8 in)
Airolaf	9.3 °C (48.7 °F)	31.9 °C (89.4 °F)	431 mm (17.0 in)
Dorra	19.0 °C (66.2 °F)	39.5 °C (103.1 °F)	161 mm (6.3 in)
Guirrari	15.5 °C (59.9 °F)	35.9 °C (96.6 °F)	265 mm (10.4 in)
Itki	11.3 °C (52.3 °F)	32.3 °C (90.1 °F)	418 mm (16.5 in)

== Towns ==
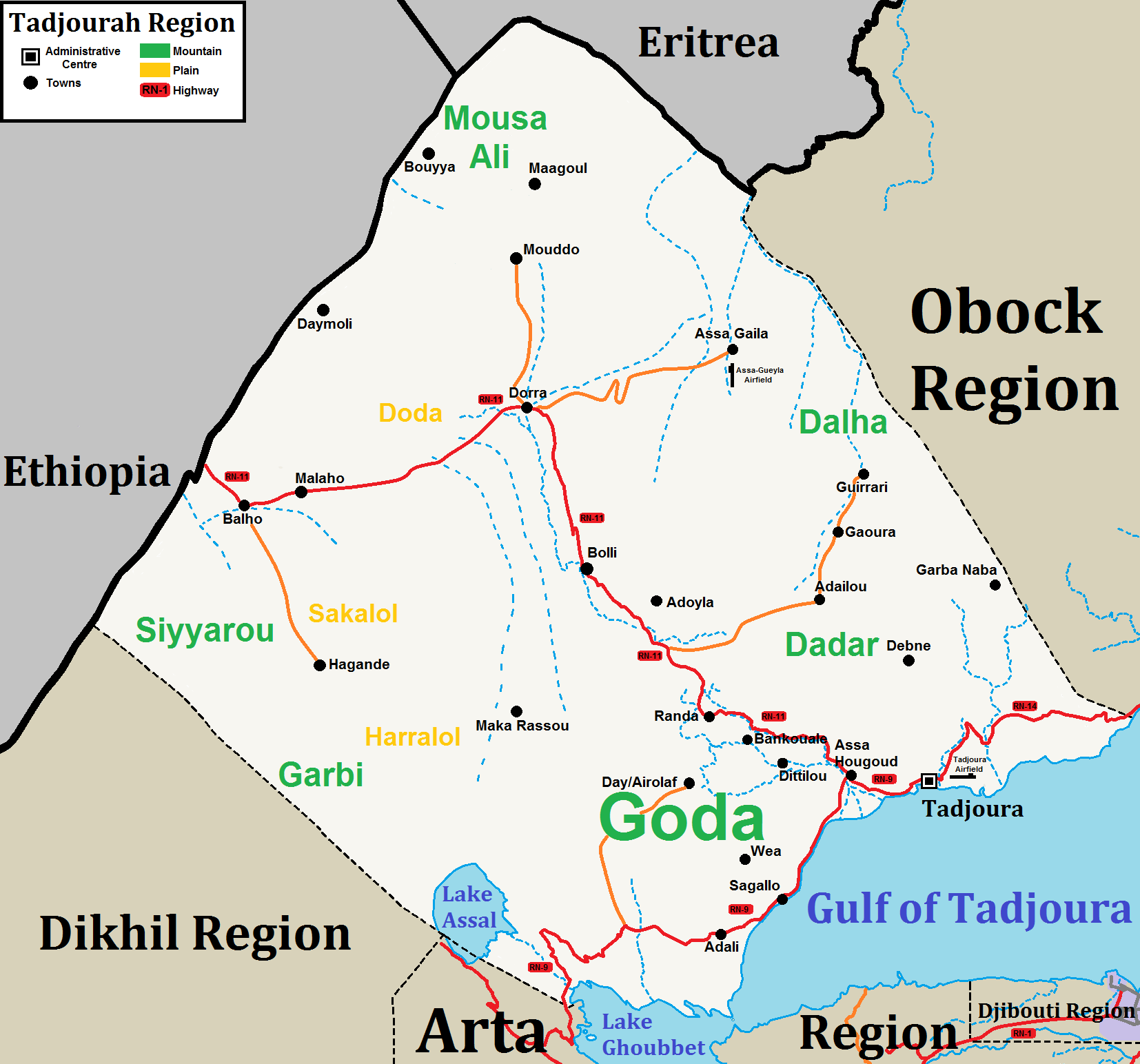
Map of the Tadjourah Region.

Tadjourah Region
Town names
Tadjourah
Randa
`Assa Gaila
Adailou
Sagallo
Airolaf
Dorra
Balho
Guirrari
Bankouale
Mouddo
Debne
Ambabbo
Adoyla
Itki
Malaho
Bouyya
Karabti San
