= Regions of Djibouti =

Regions of Djibouti Gobolada Jabuuti (Somali) Rakaakay Gabuutih (Afar)
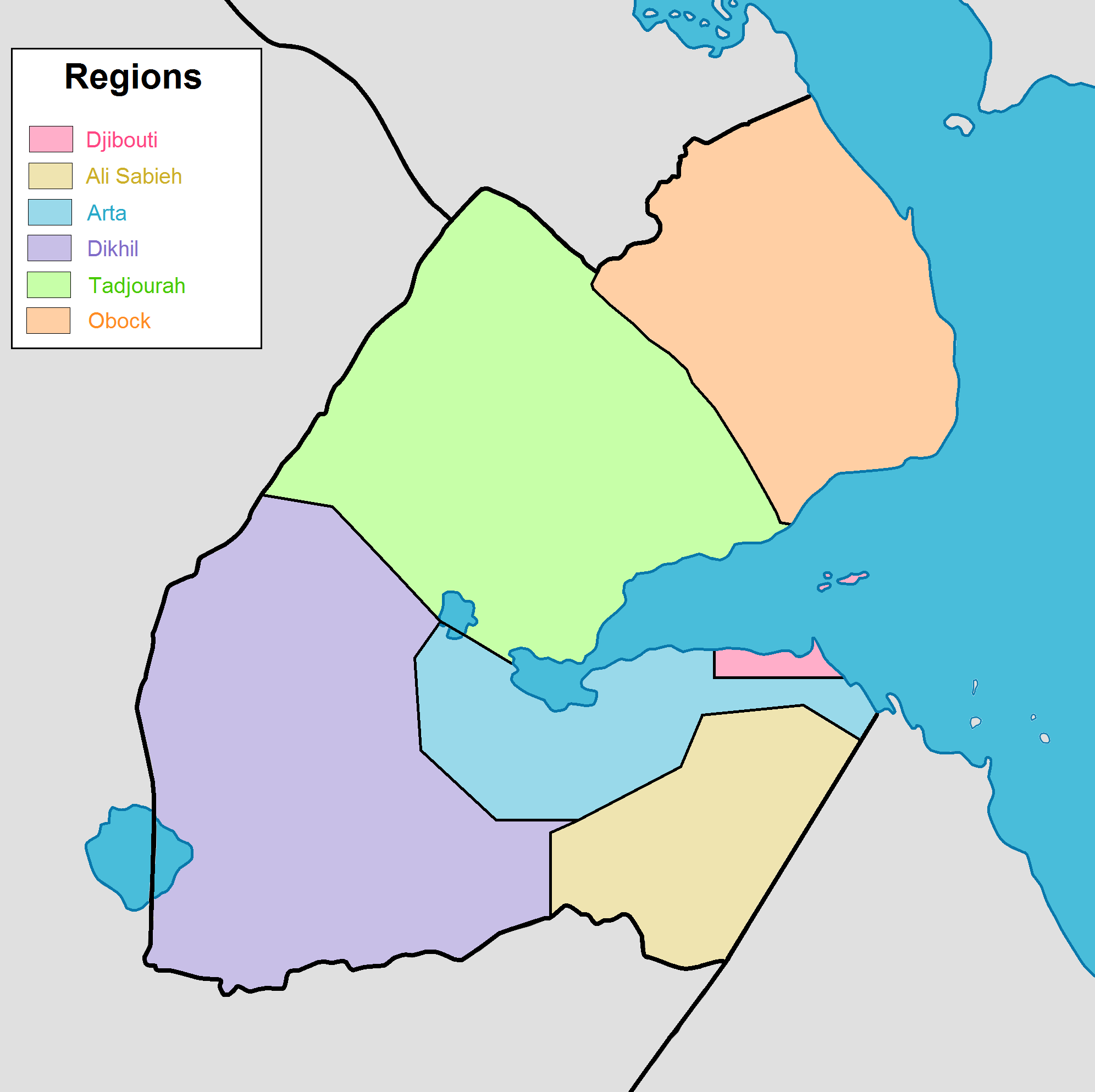
- Category: Unitary state
- Location: Republic of Djibouti
- Number: 6 Regions
- Government: Region government
- Subdivisions: Sub-prefecture

The regions (régions) of Djibouti are the primary geographical divisions through which Djibouti is administered.

== History ==
The first administrative division of the territory, in 1914, defined two zones besides the city of Djibouti: the sub-prefecture "Dankali" and "Issa". With the occupation of the territory at the end of the 1920s, the circles of Tadjourah and "Gobad-Dikkil" are created. In 1939, the circle of Ali Sabieh is extracted from the last. In 1963, Obock's circle was created by division of that of Tadjourah region.

In 1967, the circle of Djibouti is transformed into sub-prefecture, then divided into three sub-prefectures.

After independence in 1977, the circles become regions. The last important modification of the administrative map of the territory is the creation of the region of Arta in 2003.

== Regions ==
Regions
Region	Area	Population	Administrative Centre
Djibouti Region	200 km^{2}	748,000	Djibouti City
Ali Sabieh Region	2,400 km^{2}	71,640	Ali Sabieh
Arta Region	1,800 km^{2}	40,163	Arta
Dikhil Region	7,200 km^{2}	83,409	Dikhil
Tadjourah Region	7,100 km^{2}	89,567	Tadjoura
Obock Region	4,700 km^{2}	37,856	Obock

== See also ==
- ISO 3166-2:DJ
