= List of airports in Djibouti =

This is a list of airports in Djibouti, sorted by location.

== Airports ==
Location	ICAO	IATA	Airport name
Civil airports			
Ali-Sabieh	HDAS	AII	Ali-Sabieh Airport
Assa-Gueyla	HDAG		Assa-Gueyla Airport
Chabelley	HDCH		Chabelley Airport
Dikhil	HDDK		Dikhil Airport
Djibouti City	HDAM	JIB	Djibouti–Ambouli International Airport
Khôr ‘Angar	HDHE		Herkale Airport
Moucha Island	HDMO	MHI	Moucha Airport
Obock	HDOB	OBC	Obock Airport
Tadjoura	HDTJ	TDJ	Tadjoura Airport
Military airports			
Djibouti City			Djibouti Military Airport

== See also ==
- Transport in Djibouti
- List of airports by ICAO code: H#HD - Djibouti
- Wikipedia: WikiProject Aviation/Airline destination lists: Africa#Djibouti
