= ʽAlaili Dadda =

ʽAlaili Dadda علايلي دادا
- Town
- Location in Djibouti
- Coordinates: 12°25′N 42°54′E
- Country: Djibouti
- Region: Obock
- Sub-prefecture: Alaili Dadda`
- Elevation: 385 m (1,263 ft)

Population (2017)
  - Total: 5,500

ʽAlaili Dadda (Arabic: علايلي دادا) is a town in northern Djibouti. It is situated about 68 kilometers north of Obock, at an elevation of 1,263 feet from sea level. The town sprawls on a wide basin surrounded by granitic mountains on all sides. It is located in the Alaili Dadda sub-prefecture of the Obock region. N16 road is located on. to the nearest settlements, Khor Angar, Dadda'to and Obock. The capital city Djibouti to quite far, but close to the city outside the two major Dadda'to. Is the capital of Obock region. Khor Angar the second largest city in the region. Dadda Alaile the 4th largest in the region or 5th.

== Overview ==
The town lies on the National Highway 16. Nearby towns and villages include Dadda`to, Moulhoule, Bissidiro, Waddi and Lahassa.

== Demographics ==
The majority of the population of Alaili Dadda is Afars.

== Climate ==
The climate is tropical in Alaili Dadda. Throughout the year there is little rainfall in Alaili Dadda. An arid and arid desert climate there. Rainfall during the winter months is very rare. Agriculture is very rare, at the time of fruits and vegetables grown in the hot, desert plants or Aloe Vera is. Alaili Dadda 'the Aloe Vera cultivation, provides great gain for the economy of the city. In fact, even be called the greatest gain. The average annual temperature in Alaili Dadda is 28.2 °C. About 135 mm of precipitation falls annually. The warmest month of the year is July with an average temperature of 33.1 °C. In January, the average temperature is 23.6 °C. It is the lowest average temperature of the whole year. The Koussour Bouyyi Wadi runs through the town. It is often dry but subject to flooding.

Climate data for Alaili Dadda
Month	Jan	Feb	Mar	Apr	May	Jun	Jul	Aug	Sep	Oct	Nov	Dec	Year
Mean daily maximum °C (°F)	27.7 (81.9)	28.0 (82.4)	29.7 (85.5)	31.6 (88.9)	34.7 (94.5)	37.4 (99.3)	38.2 (100.8)	37.4 (99.3)	35.7 (96.3)	32.6 (90.7)	29.8 (85.6)	27.9 (82.2)	32.6 (90.6)
Mean daily minimum °C (°F)	19.6 (67.3)	20.4 (68.7)	21.6 (70.9)	23.3 (73.9)	25.7 (78.3)	28.2 (82.8)	28.0 (82.4)	27.3 (81.1)	27.3 (81.1)	23.8 (74.8)	21.5 (70.7)	20.4 (68.7)	23.9 (75.1)
Average precipitation mm (inches)	10 (0.4)	11 (0.4)	13 (0.5)	11 (0.4)	6 (0.2)	2 (0.1)	13 (0.5)	19 (0.7)	17 (0.7)	7 (0.3)	14 (0.6)	12 (0.5)	135 (5.3)
Source: Climate-Data.org
