= Fagal =

Fagal فغال
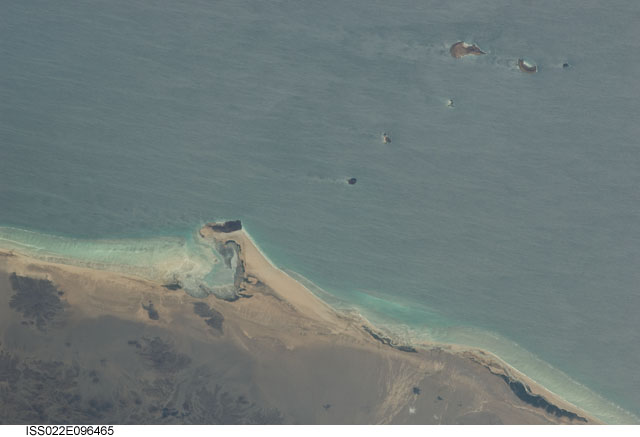

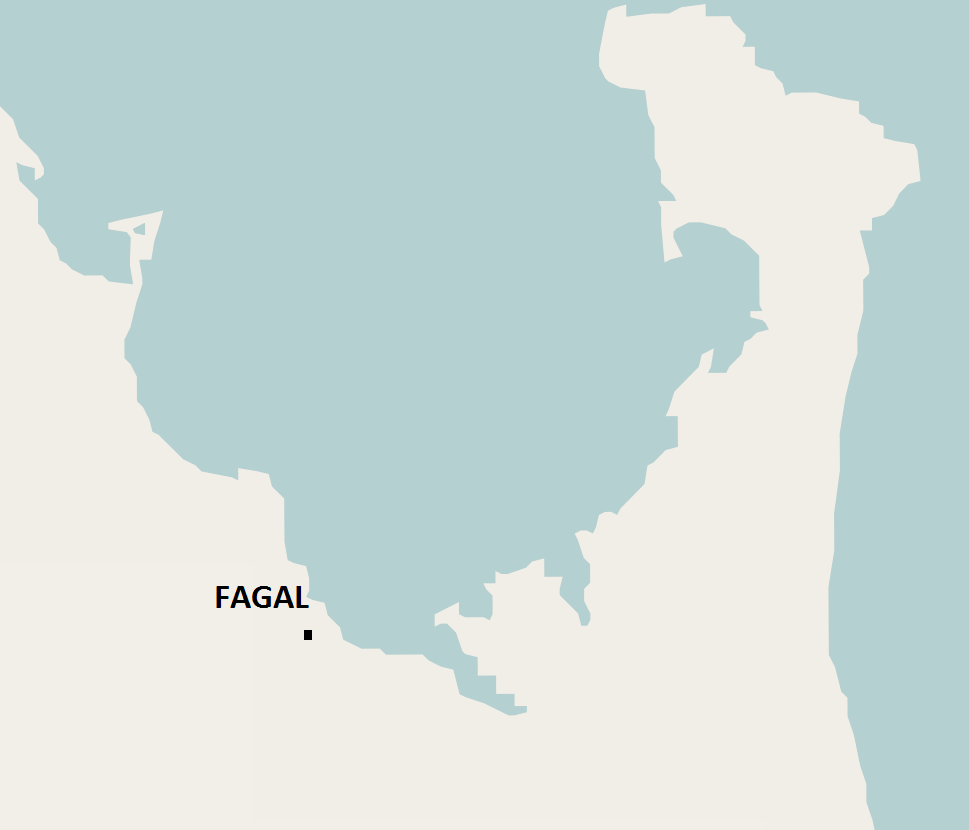

- Location in Djibouti
- Coordinates: 12°27′N 43°17′E
- Country: Djibouti
- Region: Obock
- Time zone: UTC+3 (EAT)
  - Summer (DST): UTC+3 (EAT)

Fagal (Arabic: فغال) is a coastal location in eastern Djibouti. It lies north of Obock. It lies along the N15 road, connected to the Eritrean border at Rahayta to the north. The peninsula strip nearby is called the Ras Siyyan. Just to the south is Herkale Airport and the village of Khor `Angar.

== Overview ==
The relative uplift rates calculated at Fagal in the early 1980s were reportedly 24 at Fagal, 320 at Obock, 256 at Tadjoura, and 72 mm/103 yr at Djibouti City.

During the last ice age, which affected water levels, it is believed that many people migrated across the Strait of Mandab of the Red Sea from the Fagal area to Yemen. Similarly it was a likely landing ground for many people arriving in the Horn of Africa from the Middle East.

In 2010, Dominican Republican swimmer Marcos Diaz swam from Perim Island in Mayyun, Yemen to the coast of Fagal as part of a mission to swim across the continents between May and August 2010 with four major swims, touching eight countries. His first swim was from Oceania to Asia, swimming from Wutung in Papua New Guinea to Mabo in Jayapura, Indonesia, the second from Mayyun to Fagal, the third from Marruecos, Morocco to Tarifa, Spain across the Strait of Gibraltar, and the fourth from Big Diomedes Island in Russia to Little Diomedes Island in Alaska.
