= National Highway 15 (Djibouti) =

Highway in Djibouti

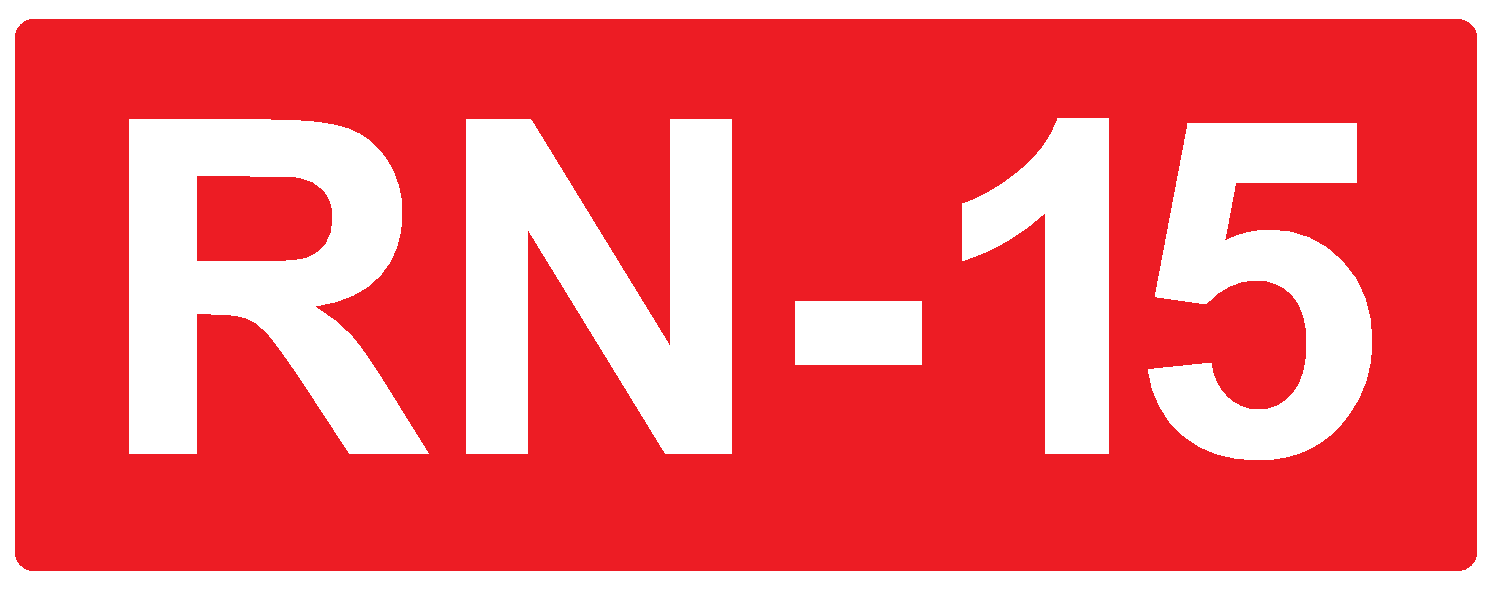
National Highway 15
- Arabic: الطريق السريع الوطنى 15; French: Route Nationale 15
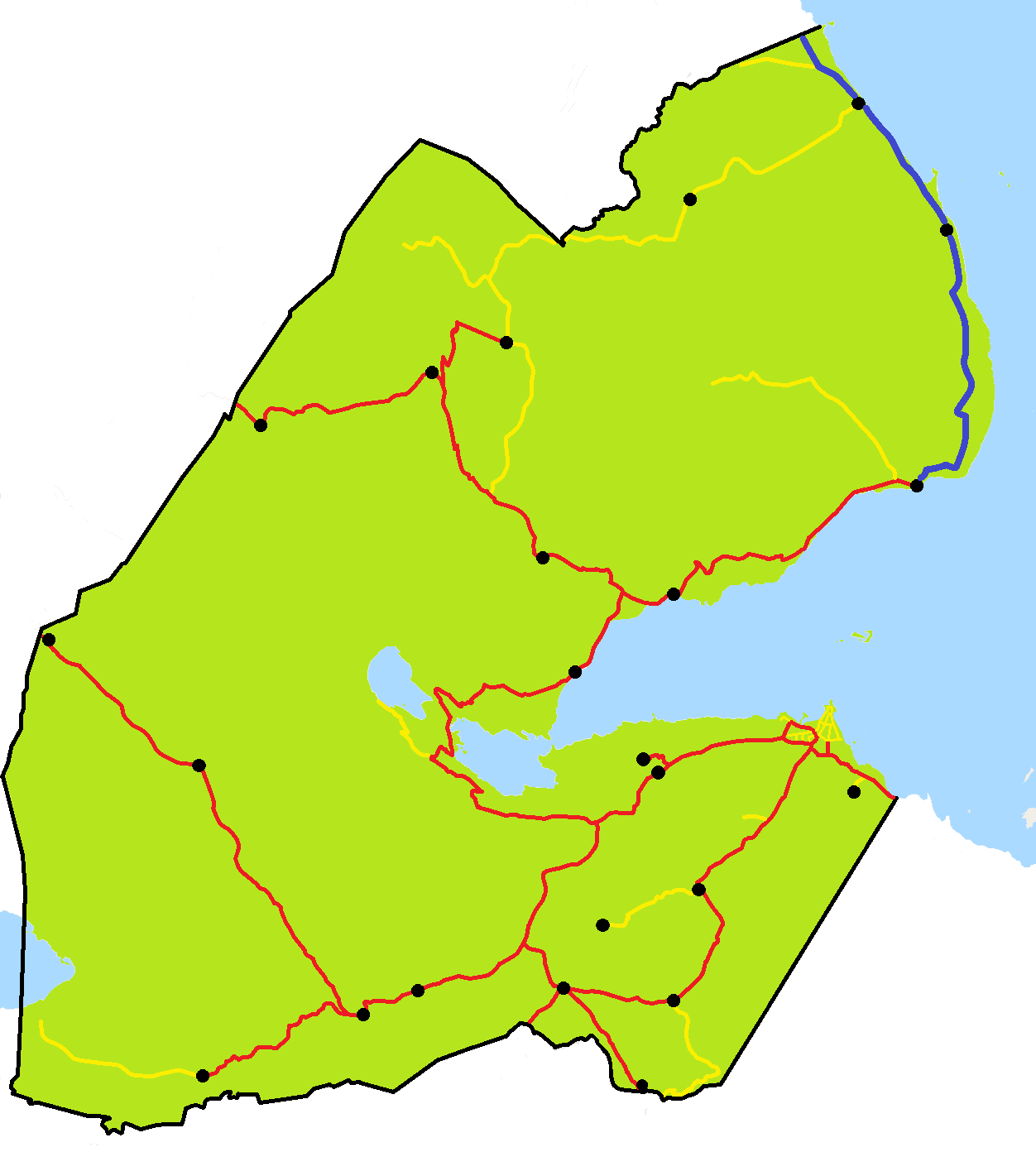

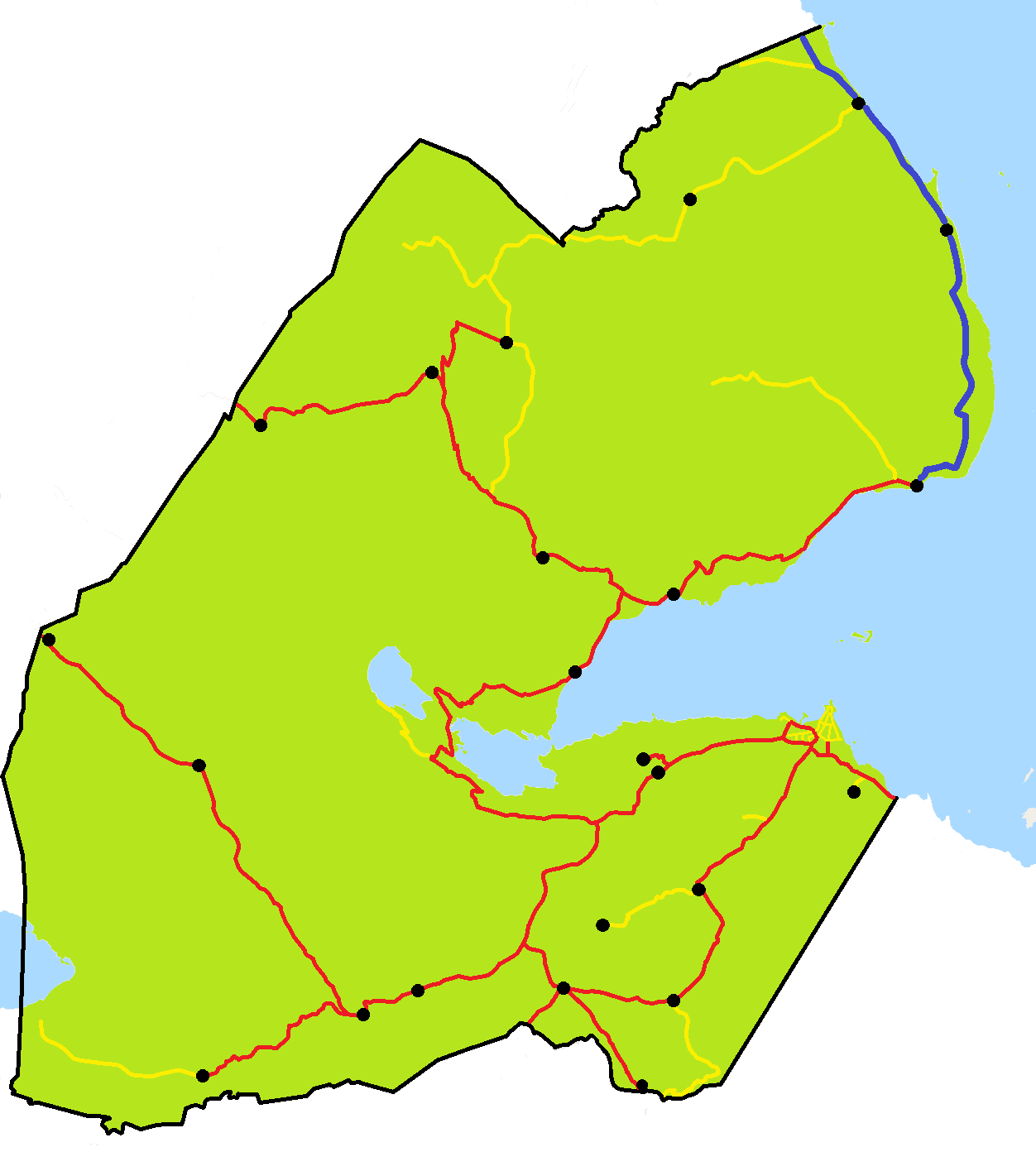

Route information
- Length: 103 km (64 mi)

Major junctions
- From: Obock
- To: Eritrean Border

Location
- Country: Djibouti
- Major cities: Khôr ‘Angar, Moulhoule

Highway system
- Transport in Djibouti

The RN-15 National Highway connects from Obock to Eritrean Border, and is 103 kilometres (64 mi) long, it runs along most of the Bab-el-Mandeb coastline. It is the longest route in Obock Region.
