= List of highways numbered 15W =

Route 15W or Highway 15W may refer to:

- Interstate 15W, two former designations in Idaho and California
- Georgia State Route 15W (former)
- K-15W (Kansas highway), now part of K-15

== See also ==
- List of highways numbered 15
- List of highways numbered 15A
- List of highways numbered 15E
