= Medeho =

Medeho مديهو
- Town
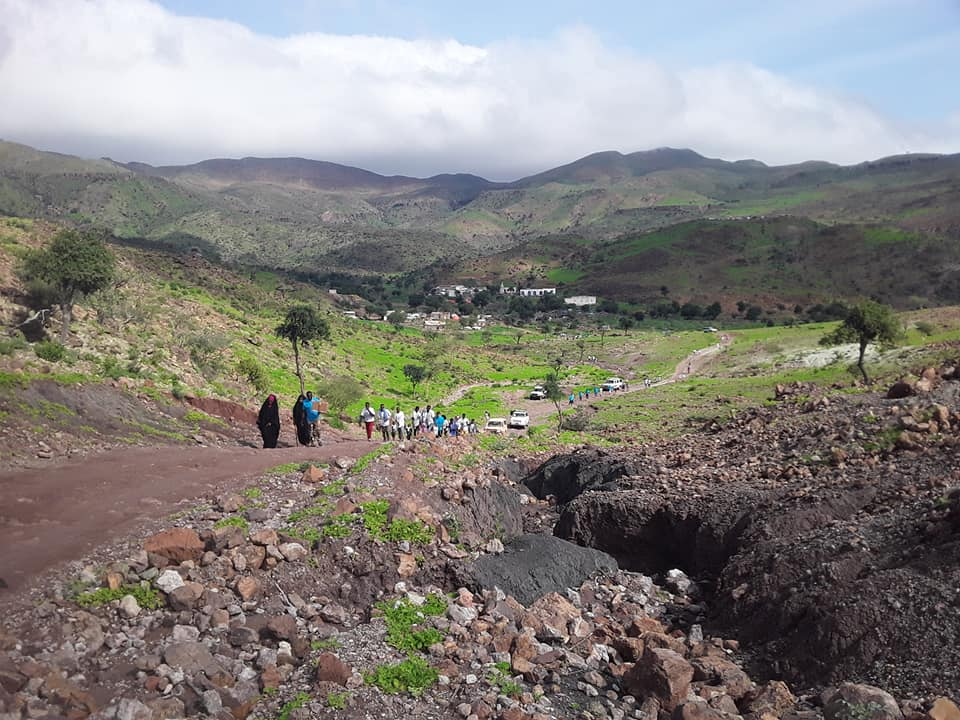
- Medeho and the mountains of Mabla

- Location in Djibouti
- Coordinates: 11°58′20″N 43°1′29″E
- Country: Djibouti
- Region: Obock
- Elevation: 690 m (2,260 ft)

Population
  - Total: 4,000

Medeho (Arabic: مديهو) is a town in the northeastern Obock Region of Djibouti. Medeho has one of the mildest climates in Djibouti, which is not always passable during the rainy season. The town is overlooked by Mabla Mountains, the fifth tallest mountain in Djibouti. As of 2016, the population of Medeho has been estimated to be 4,000. It is situated approximately 39 km (24 mi) west of Obock, the regional capital.

== Overview ==
Nearby towns and villages include Tadjoura (42 km) and Obock (39 km).

== Climate ==
Medeho has a hot semi-arid climate (BSh) in Köppen-Geiger system, with the influence of mountain climate.

Climate data for Medeho
Month	Jan	Feb	Mar	Apr	May	Jun	Jul	Aug	Sep	Oct	Nov	Dec	Year
Mean daily maximum °C (°F)	24.0 (75.2)	24.3 (75.7)	26.4 (79.5)	28.4 (83.1)	31.5 (88.7)	34.7 (94.5)	35.1 (95.2)	34.1 (93.4)	32.4 (90.3)	29.2 (84.6)	26.1 (79.0)	24.2 (75.6)	29.2 (84.6)
Mean daily minimum °C (°F)	14.2 (57.6)	15.4 (59.7)	16.6 (61.9)	18.7 (65.7)	21.2 (70.2)	23.6 (74.5)	24.5 (76.1)	23.2 (73.8)	22.7 (72.9)	18.8 (65.8)	16.4 (61.5)	15.0 (59.0)	19.2 (66.6)
Average precipitation mm (inches)	36 (1.4)	33 (1.3)	19 (0.7)	25 (1.0)	11 (0.4)	7 (0.3)	24 (0.9)	36 (1.4)	37 (1.5)	12 (0.5)	35 (1.4)	30 (1.2)	305 (12)
Source: Climate-Data.org
