= Autoroute 15 =

Autoroute 15 may refer to:

- A15 autoroute, in France
- Quebec Autoroute 15, in Quebec, Canada

== See also ==
- List of A15 roads
- List of highways numbered 15
