= National Highway 11 (Djibouti) =

Highway in Djibouti

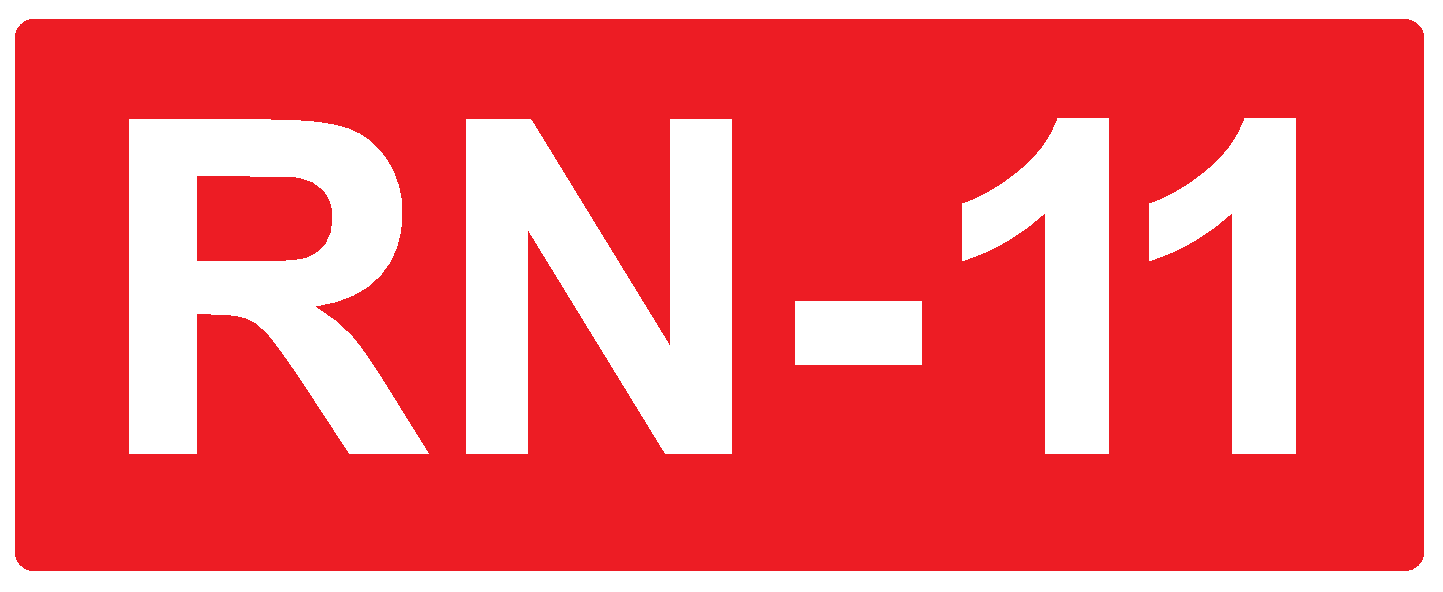
National Highway 11
- Arabic: الطريق السريع الوطنى 11; French: Route Nationale 11
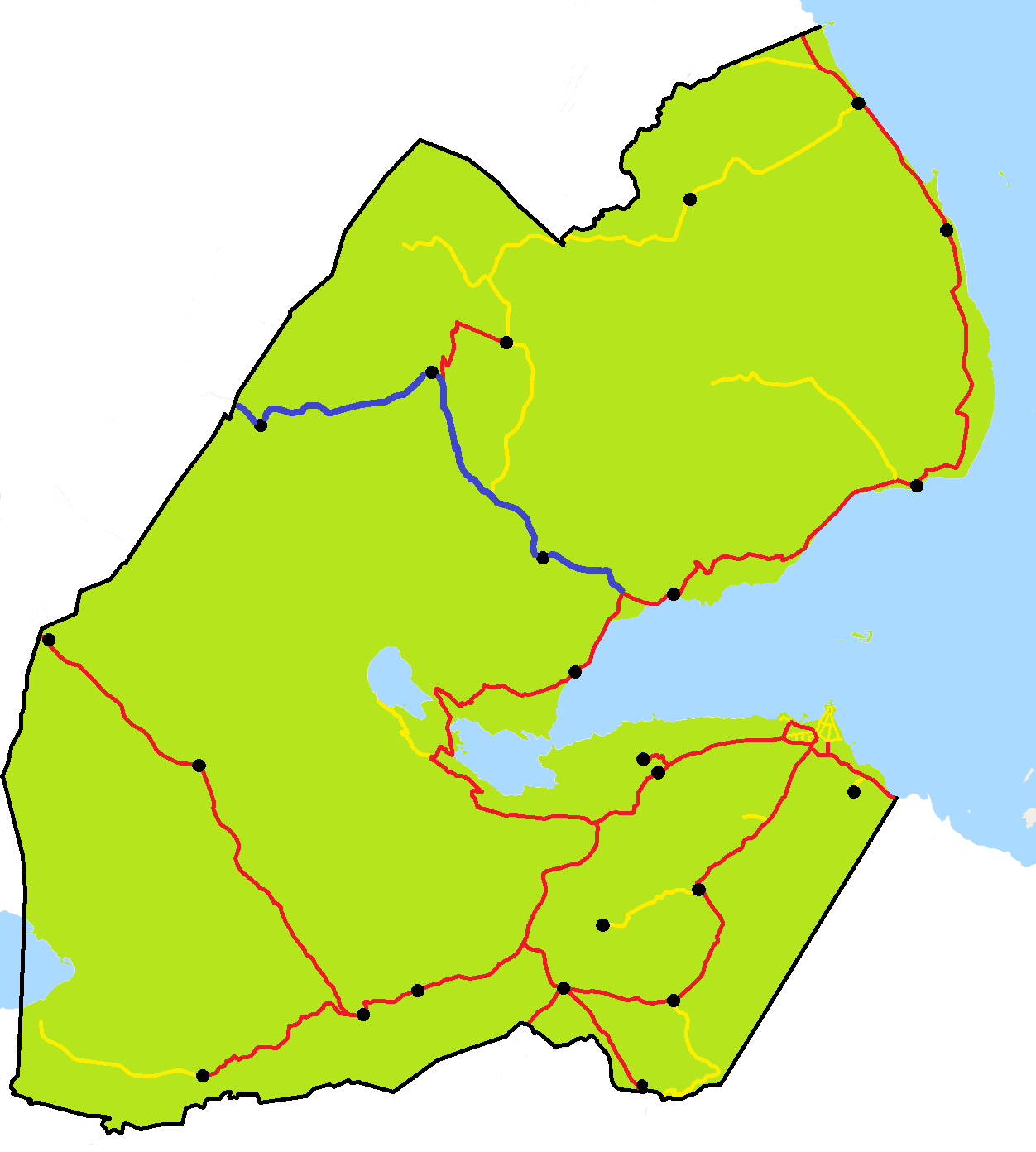

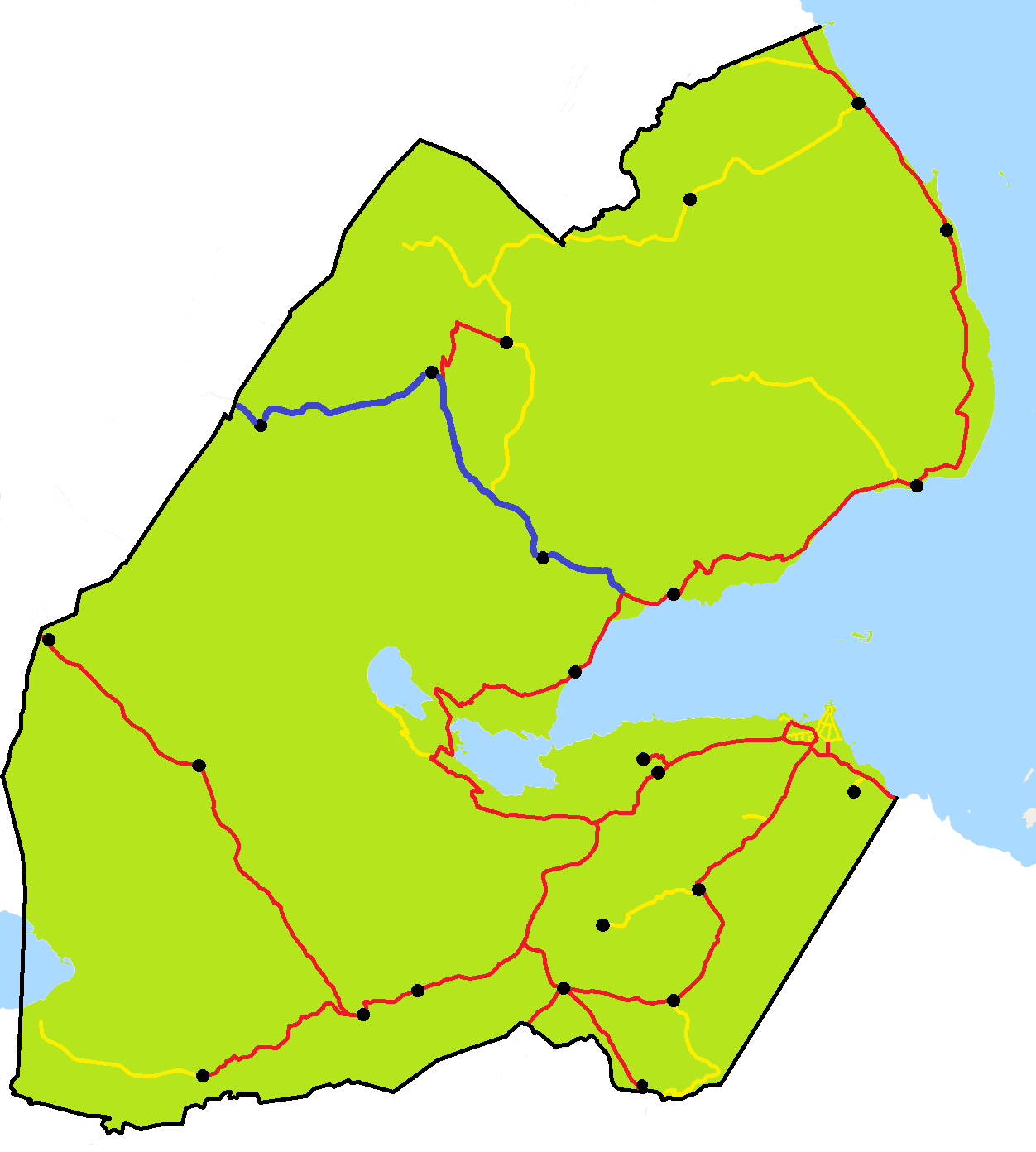

Route information
- Length: 120 km (75 mi)
- Existed: 2019–present

Major junctions
- From: Junction with National Highway 9
- To: Ethiopian Border

Location
- Country: Djibouti
- Major cities: Randa, Dorra, Balho, Malaho

Highway system
- Transport in Djibouti

The RN-11 National Highway is a national highway in Djibouti. It has a length of 120 kilometres (75 mi) across the region of Tadjourah and is the most important road link in the country. It runs from Tadjoura on the Gulf of Tadjoura through the mountains to the Ethiopian border on the west.

The road is mentioned in the 2009 IMF report where restoring the road was one of priorities. According to the document, the action was about'upgrading to modern dirt road standard of the Randa - Dorra segment of National Highway 11, linking the Route de l’Unité to Ethiopia through the north-eastern zones of the country, and the Randa-Day segments serving one of the country's key tourist areas. The sections in question are 51 km and 15 km long, respectively. The components of the project are as follows: technical, economic and environmental studies, earthworks surveillance and oversight of works execution'.
