= A15 =

A15 or A-15 may refer to:

- A15 phases, a crystallographic structure type of certain intermetallic compounds
- A15 road, in several countries
- Antonov A-15, a Soviet glider
- British NVC community A15 (Elodea canadensis community), a British Isles plant community
- Chery A15, a 2003 Chinese 4-door car
- Nissan A15, a straight-4 engine used in a range of cars by Nissan/Datsun
- ATC code A15 Appetite stimulants, a subgroup of the Anatomical Therapeutic Chemical Classification System
- Cortex A15, ARM Holdings' processor architecture
- English Opening, Encyclopaedia of Chess Openings code
- A15 light bulb, a common household bulb
- Apple A15 Bionic processor, designed by Apple and used in the iPad Mini (2021), iPhone SE (2022), iPhone 13, iPhone 13 Pro, and iPhone 14
- Samsung Galaxy A15, an Android device developed by Samsung Electronics

It may also refer to:

- A proposed attack version of Martin B-10 bomber
- Subfamily A15, a rhodopsin-like receptors subfamily
