= National Highway 14 (Djibouti) =

Highway in Djibouti

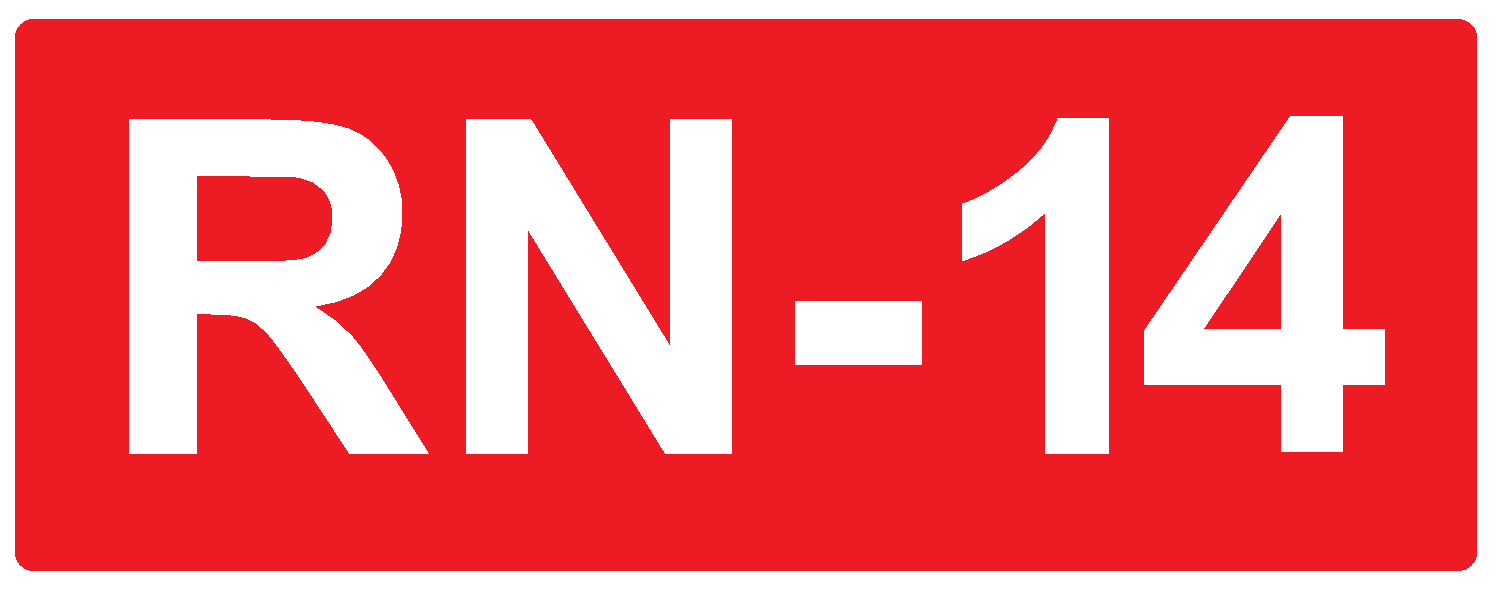
National Highway 14
- Arabic: الطريق السريع الوطنى 14; French: Route Nationale 14
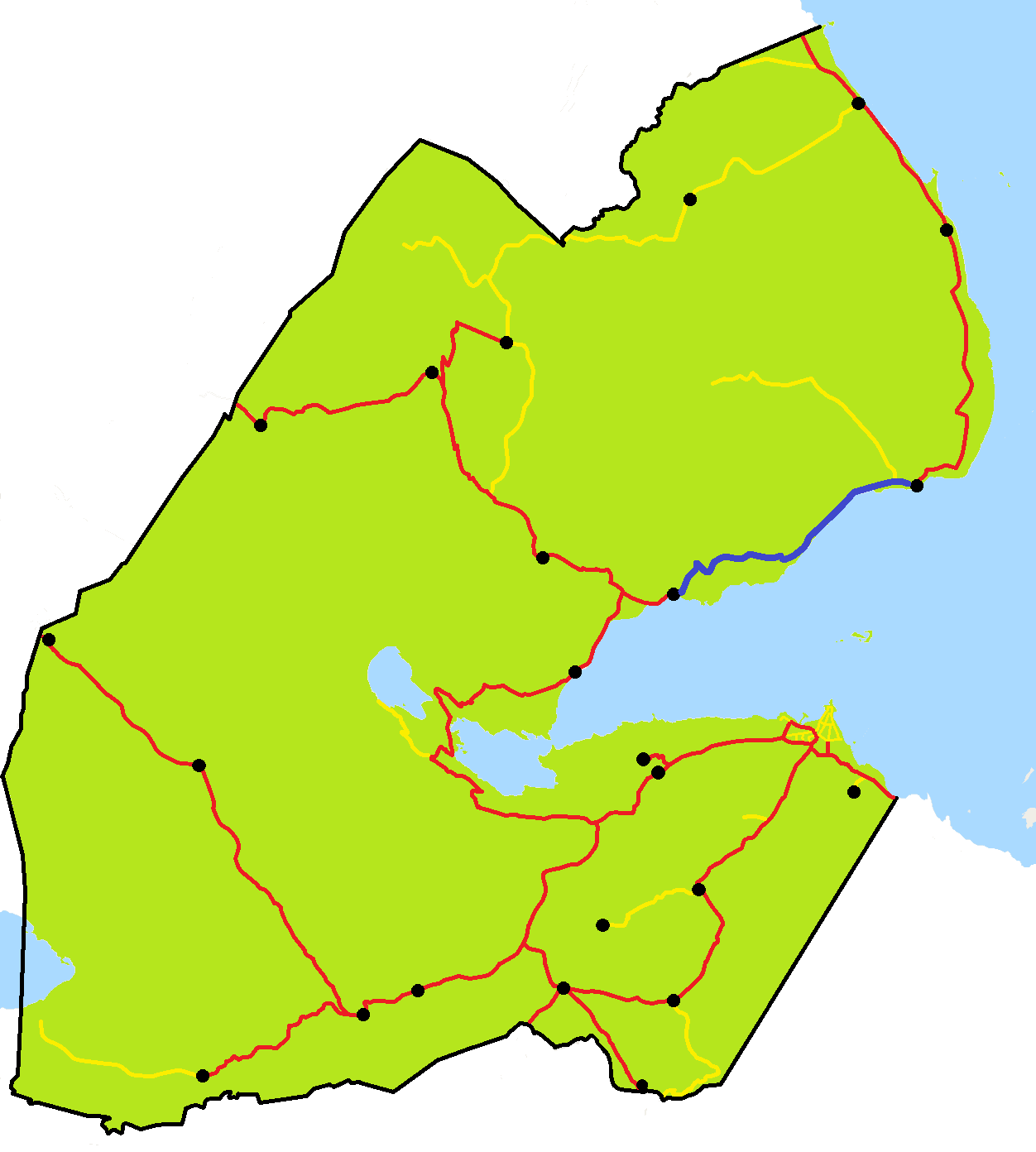

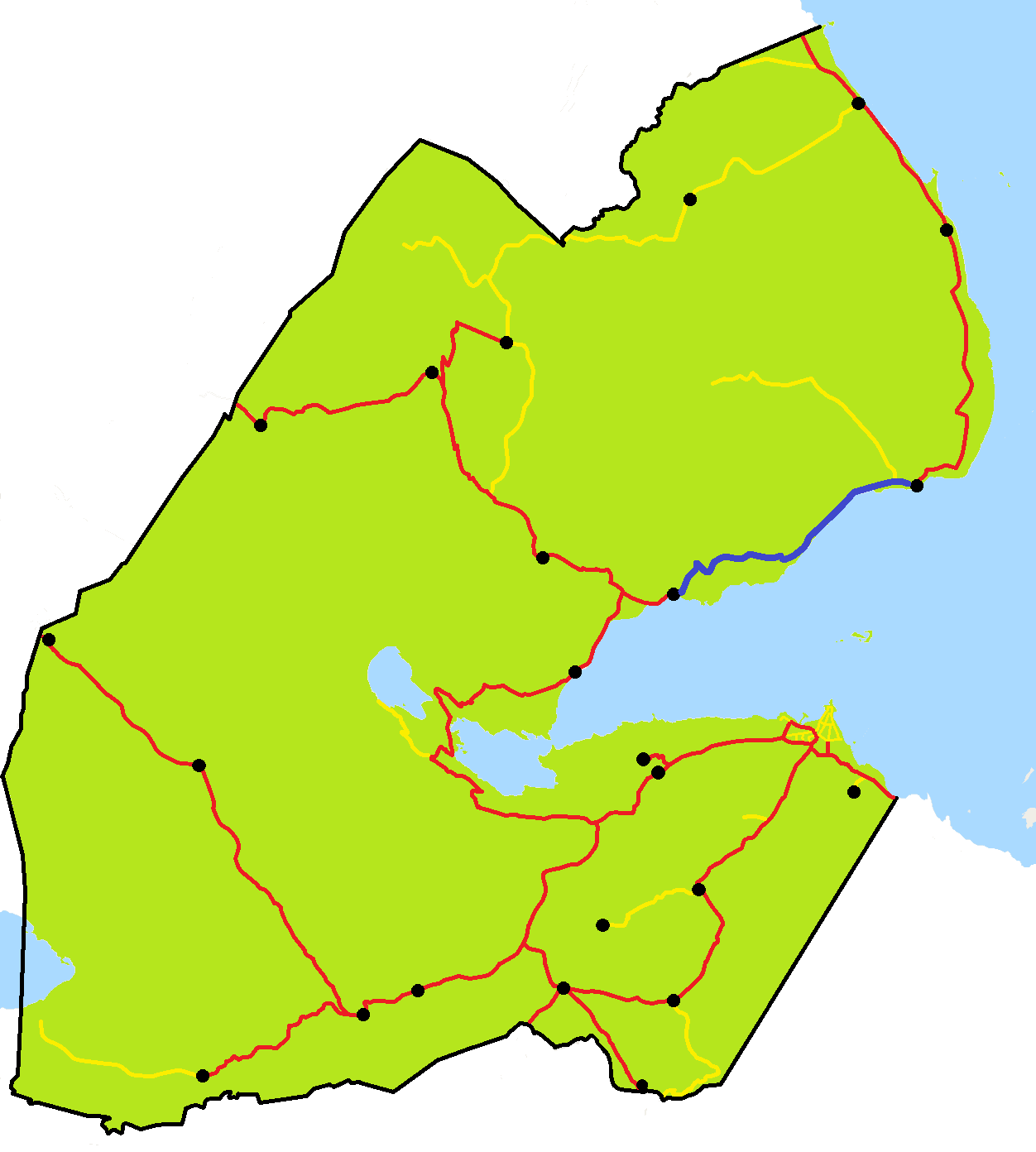

Route information
- Length: 61 km (38 mi)
- Existed: 1988–present

Major junctions
- From: Tadjoura
- To: Obock

Location
- Country: Djibouti

Highway system
- Transport in Djibouti

The RN-14 National Highway connects from Tadjoura to Obock, and is 61 kilometres (38 mi) long, it runs along most of the Gulf of Tadjoura coastline of the Djibouti.
