= List of highways numbered 15E =

Route 15E or Highway 15E may refer to:

- Former Interstate 15E, now Interstate 215 in California
- Former K-15E (Kansas highway), now part of K-148

== See also ==
- List of highways numbered 15
- List of highways numbered 15A
- List of highways numbered 15W
