= Moulhoule =

Moulhoule مول هولة
- Town
- Location in Djibouti
- Coordinates: 12°35′N 43°11′E
- Country: Djibouti
- Region: Obock
- Elevation: 6 m (20 ft)

Moulhoule (Arabic: مول هولة) is a town in the northern Obock region of Djibouti. It is situated on the west coast of the Red Sea, at its southern entrance. It is located on the RN-15 National Highway, which connects it to Obock, located some 70 kilometres (43 miles) to the south and is 15 kilometres (9 miles) south of the border with Eritrea.

== Overview ==
Moulhoule is located beside the Bab el Mandeb Strait in the north-east of the Republic of Djibouti, 325 km (202 mi) (by road) from Djibouti City. Nearby towns and villages include Khôr ‘Angar (27 km), Rahayta (22 km), Assab (95 km).

== Climate ==
Moulhoule has a hot desert climate (Köppen climate classification BWh).

Climate data for Moulhoule
Month	Jan	Feb	Mar	Apr	May	Jun	Jul	Aug	Sep	Oct	Nov	Dec	Year
Mean daily maximum °C (°F)	29 (84)	30 (86)	32 (90)	35 (95)	38 (100)	40 (104)	39 (102)	39 (102)	39 (102)	35 (95)	32 (90)	30 (86)	35 (95)
Mean daily minimum °C (°F)	21 (70)	21 (70)	22 (72)	24 (75)	25 (77)	27 (81)	28 (82)	28 (82)	27 (81)	24 (75)	22 (72)	21 (70)	24 (76)
Average precipitation mm (inches)	4 (0.2)	5 (0.2)	2 (0.1)	2 (0.1)	1 (0.0)	0 (0)	10 (0.4)	9 (0.4)	1 (0.0)	1 (0.0)	3 (0.1)	4 (0.2)	42 (1.7)
Source: Climate-Data.org
