= List of highways numbered 15 =

Route 15, or Highway 15, can refer to: For roads named A15, see A15 roads.

== International ==
- AH15 Asian Highway 15
- E15 European route E15
- E015 European route E015

== Australia ==
=== New South Wales ===
- Hunter Expressway
- New England Highway and other local Newcastle routes (New South Wales)

=== Northern Territory ===
- Tiger Brennan Drive

=== Queensland ===
- Cunningham Highway (Queensland)
- New England Highway (Queensland)

=== South Australia ===
- – South Australia

=== Tasmania ===
- Castra Road

== Canada ==
- Alberta Highway 15
- British Columbia Highway 15
- Manitoba Highway 15
- New Brunswick Route 15
- Ontario Highway 15
- Prince Edward Island Route 15
- Quebec Autoroute 15
- Saskatchewan Highway 15

== China ==
- G15 Expressway
  - G15_{w} Expressway (G15's branch)

== Cuba ==
- 2–15

== Czech Republic ==
- I/15 Highway; Czech: Silnice I/15

== Djibouti ==
- RN-15 (Djibouti)

== Greece ==
- EO15 road

== India ==
- National Highway 15 (India)
- State Highway 15 (Tamil Nadu)
- State Highway 15 (West Bengal)

== Iran ==
- Road 15

== Ireland ==
- N15 road (Ireland)

== Italy ==
- Autostrada A15
- RA 15

== Japan ==
- Japan National Route 15

== Jordan ==
- Highway 15

== Korea, South ==
- Seohaean Expressway
- National Route 15
- Gukjido 15

== Malaysia ==
- Butterworth–Kulim Expressway
- FT 15 Malaysia Federal Route 15
- A15 Jalan Tanjung Tualang
- J15 Johor State Route 15
- M15 N15 Jalan Nyalas

== Mexico ==
- Mexican Federal Highway 15
- Mexican Federal Highway 15D

== New Zealand ==
- New Zealand State Highway 15

== Paraguay ==
- National Route 15

== Poland ==
- National road 15 (Poland) runs northeast from Trzebnica to Ostróda, 395 km

== Ukraine ==
- Highway M15 (Ukraine)

== United Kingdom ==
- British A15 (Norman Cross-Hessle)

== United States ==
- Interstate 15
- U.S. Route 15
- New England Route 15 (former)
- Alabama State Route 15 (former)
  - County Route 15 (Lee County, Alabama)
- Arkansas Highway 15
- California State Route 15
  - County Route A15 (California)
  - County Route E15 (California)
  - County Route G15 (California)
  - County Route J15 (California)
  - County Route S15 (California)
- Colorado State Highway 15
- Connecticut Route 15
- Delaware Route 15
- Florida State Road 15
  - County Road 15 (Orange County, Florida)
  - County Road 15 (Seminole County, Florida)
- Georgia State Route 15
- Hawaii Route 15 (former)
- Illinois Route 15
- Indiana State Road 15
- Iowa Highway 15
- K-15 (Kansas highway)
- Kentucky Route 15
- Louisiana Highway 15
  - Louisiana State Route 15 (former)
- Maine State Route 15
- Massachusetts Route 15
- M-15 (Michigan highway)
- Minnesota State Highway 15
  - County Road 15 (Hennepin County, Minnesota)
  - County Road 15 (Ramsey County, Minnesota)
  - County Road 15 (Scott County, Minnesota)
  - County Road 15 (Washington County, Minnesota)
- Mississippi Highway 15
- Missouri Route 15
- Nebraska Highway 15
  - Nebraska Recreation Road 15B
  - Nebraska Recreation Road 15C
- Nevada State Route 15 (former)
- New Jersey Route 15
  - County Route 15 (Monmouth County, New Jersey)
- New Mexico State Road 15
- New York State Route 15
  - County Route 15 (Allegany County, New York)
    - County Route 15B (Allegany County, New York)
  - County Route 15 (Cattaraugus County, New York)
  - County Route 15 (Chautauqua County, New York)
  - County Route 15 (Franklin County, New York)
  - County Route 15 (Genesee County, New York)
  - County Route 15 (Hamilton County, New York)
  - County Route 15 (Jefferson County, New York)
  - County Route 15 (Monroe County, New York)
  - County Route 15 (Niagara County, New York)
  - County Route 15 (Oneida County, New York)
  - County Route 15 (Ontario County, New York)
  - County Route 15 (Orange County, New York)
  - County Route 15 (Orleans County, New York)
  - County Route 15 (Oswego County, New York)
  - County Route 15 (Putnam County, New York)
  - County Route 15 (Rensselaer County, New York)
  - County Route 15 (Rockland County, New York)
  - County Route 15 (Schuyler County, New York)
  - County Route 15 (Steuben County, New York)
  - County Route 15 (Suffolk County, New York)
  - County Route 15 (Tioga County, New York)
  - County Route 15 (Ulster County, New York)
  - County Route 15 (Westchester County, New York)
  - County Route 15 (Wyoming County, New York)
  - County Route 15 (Yates County, New York)
- North Carolina Highway 15 (former)
- North Dakota Highway 15
- Ohio State Route 15
- Oklahoma State Highway 15
- Oregon Route 15 (former)
- Pennsylvania Route 15 (former)
- Rhode Island Route 15
- South Dakota Highway 15
  - South Dakota Highway 15Y (former)
- Tennessee State Route 15
- Texas State Highway 15
  - Texas State Highway Loop 15
  - Farm to Market Road 15
  - Texas Park Road 15
- Utah State Route 15 (former)
- Vermont Route 15
- State Route 15 (Virginia 1918-1923) (former)
  - State Route 15 (Virginia 1923-1933) (former)
- Washington State Road 15 (former)
  - Primary State Highway 15 (Washington) (former)
  - Secondary State Highway 15B (Washington) (former)
  - Secondary State Highway 15C (Washington) (former)
  - Secondary State Highway 15D (Washington) (former)
- West Virginia Route 15
- Wisconsin Highway 15

Territories

- Guam Highway 15
- Puerto Rico Highway 15

== Uruguay ==
- Route 15 Javier Barrios Amorín

== Zambia ==
- M15 road (Zambia)

== See also ==
- List of A15 roads
- List of highways numbered 15A
- List of highways numbered 15E
- List of highways numbered 15W

Preceded by 14	Lists of highways 15	Succeeded by 16
