= Dadda'to =

Dadda'to دادتو
- Location in Djibouti
- Coordinates: 12°22.51′N 42°42.67′E
- Country: Djibouti
- Region: Obock Region
- Elevation: 460 m (1,510 ft)

Dadda'to (Arabic: دادتو) is a village in Djibouti, located in the region of Obock.

== Overview ==
The town lies near the border with Eritrea. Nearby towns and villages include Alaili Dadda (30 km) and Assa Gaila (38 km).

== Main sights ==
The village wall comprises a surface no larger than 80 m × 60 m, with a dozen houses and a mosque.

== History ==
It is the largest settlement on the Djiboutian border with Eritrea. When France and Italy first set the boundary between Italian Eritrea and French Somaliland, Dadda'to was used as a term of reference for the latitude at which the horizontal boundary was placed. The Djibouti–Eritrea boundary has since been changed, but Dadda'to remains on the frontier.

== Climate ==
The climate is arid desert climate in Dadda'to. Agriculture is very rare, at the time of fruits and vegetables grown in the hot, desert plants or Aloe Vera.

Climate data for Dadda'to
Month	Jan	Feb	Mar	Apr	May	Jun	Jul	Aug	Sep	Oct	Nov	Dec	Year
Mean daily maximum °C (°F)	27.7 (81.9)	28.0 (82.4)	29.7 (85.5)	31.6 (88.9)	34.7 (94.5)	37.4 (99.3)	38.2 (100.8)	37.4 (99.3)	35.7 (96.3)	32.6 (90.7)	29.8 (85.6)	27.9 (82.2)	32.6 (90.6)
Mean daily minimum °C (°F)	17.7 (63.9)	18.3 (64.9)	19.4 (66.9)	21.6 (70.9)	23.8 (74.8)	26.5 (79.7)	27.9 (82.2)	26.6 (79.9)	25.7 (78.3)	23.1 (73.6)	21.0 (69.8)	18.9 (66.0)	22.5 (72.6)
Average precipitation mm (inches)	10 (0.4)	11 (0.4)	13 (0.5)	11 (0.4)	6 (0.2)	2 (0.1)	15 (0.6)	20 (0.8)	18 (0.7)	7 (0.3)	14 (0.6)	12 (0.5)	139 (5.5)
Source: Climate-Data.org
