= Obock Airport =

Airport in Djibouti

- IATA: OBC; ICAO: HDOB

Summary
- Airport type: Public
- Serves: Obock, Djibouti
- Elevation AMSL: 69 ft / 21 m
- Coordinates: 11°58′06″N 43°16′43″E

Map
- Location of airport in Djibouti

Runways
Direction	Length		Surface
Direction	m	ft	Surface
	1,390	4,560

Obock Airport (IATA: OBC, ICAO: HDOB) is an airport serving Obock, a city in the Obock Region of Djibouti.

== Facilities ==
The airport resides at an elevation of 69 feet (21 m) above mean sea level. It has one runway which is 1,390 metres (4,560 ft) long.
