= Laʼassa =

Laʼassa لأسا
- Town
- Location in Djibouti
- Coordinates: 12°21′N 43°9′E
- Country: Djibouti
- Region: Obock

Laʼassa (Arabic: لأسا), also known as Lahassa, is a town in the northern Obock region of Djibouti.

== Climate ==
Climate data for La`assa
Month	Jan	Feb	Mar	Apr	May	Jun	Jul	Aug	Sep	Oct	Nov	Dec	Year
Mean daily maximum °C (°F)	29.1 (84.4)	29.2 (84.6)	30.9 (87.6)	32.8 (91.0)	35.4 (95.7)	38.1 (100.6)	39.5 (103.1)	38.7 (101.7)	36.7 (98.1)	33.8 (92.8)	31.1 (88.0)	29.5 (85.1)	33.7 (92.7)
Mean daily minimum °C (°F)	21.8 (71.2)	22.5 (72.5)	23.7 (74.7)	25.2 (77.4)	27.3 (81.1)	29.6 (85.3)	29.5 (85.1)	28.9 (84.0)	29.0 (84.2)	25.7 (78.3)	23.6 (74.5)	22.5 (72.5)	25.8 (78.4)
Average precipitation mm (inches)	6 (0.2)	6 (0.2)	10 (0.4)	5 (0.2)	2 (0.1)	0 (0)	6 (0.2)	9 (0.4)	10 (0.4)	5 (0.2)	10 (0.4)	8 (0.3)	77 (3)

== See also ==
- Sedorre
