= Koussour Koussour =

Koussour Koussour كوسور كوسور Kusuur
- Location in Djibouti
- Coordinates: 11°32′N 42°28′E
- Country: Djibouti
- Region: Arta
- Elevation: 221 m (725 ft)

Population
  - Total: 170

Koussour Koussour (Somali: Kusuur, Arabic: كوسور) is a drinking water well in the Arta Region of Djibouti. It is located about 94 kilometres (58 miles) west of the capital, Djibouti City.

== Overview ==
It lies next to the RN-9 National Highway. Its population is around 221 residents, mostly Afar.

Nearby towns and villages include Arta (66 km), Tadjoura (85 km) and Sagallo (52 km).
