= Mabla Mountains =

Mountain range in Djibouti

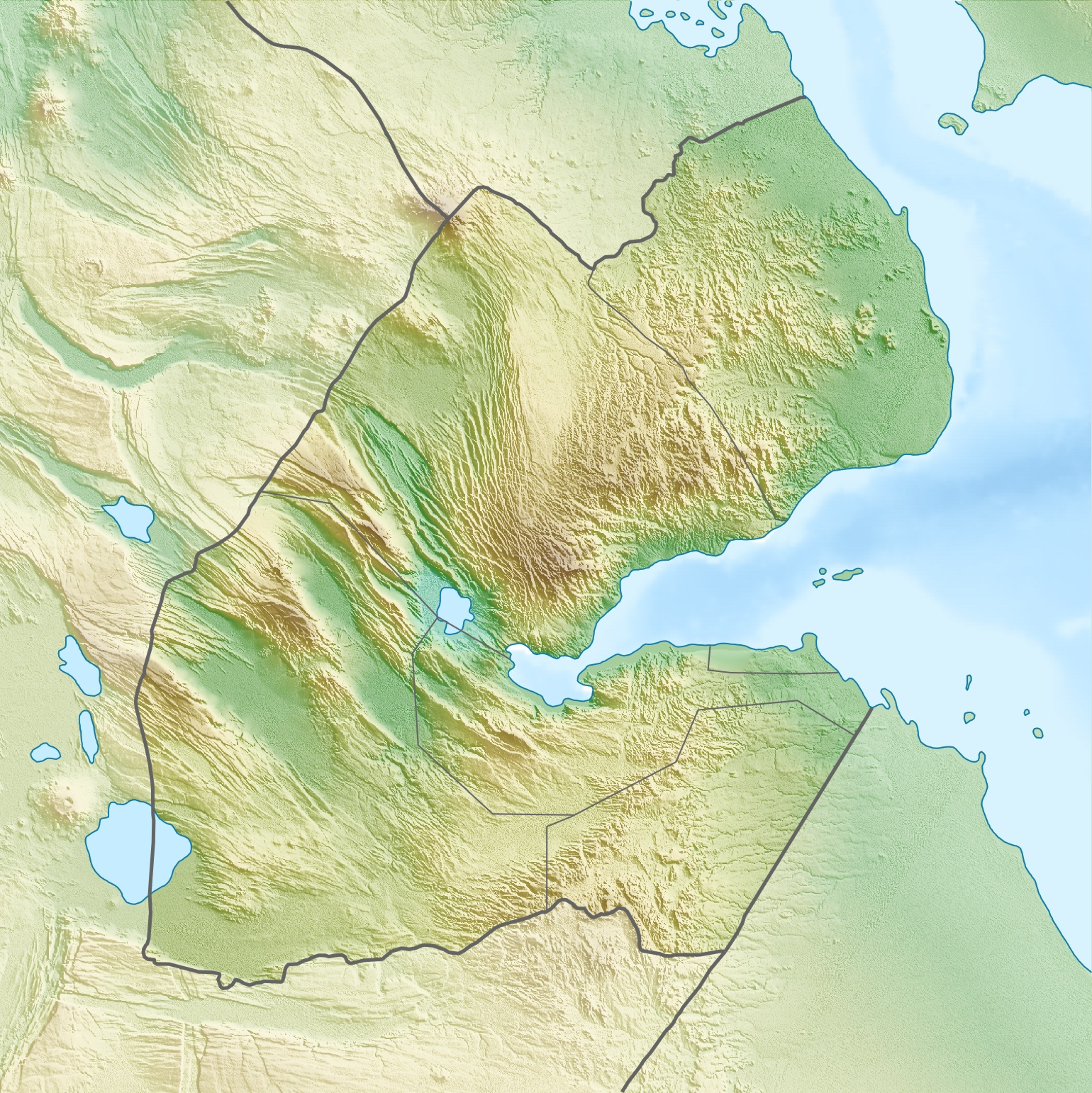
- Location within Djibouti

Highest point
- Elevation: 1,370 m (4,490 ft)at Loubaklou
- Coordinates: 11.945°N 43.043°E

Geography
- Country: Djibouti
- Region(s): Obock Region and Tadjoura Region

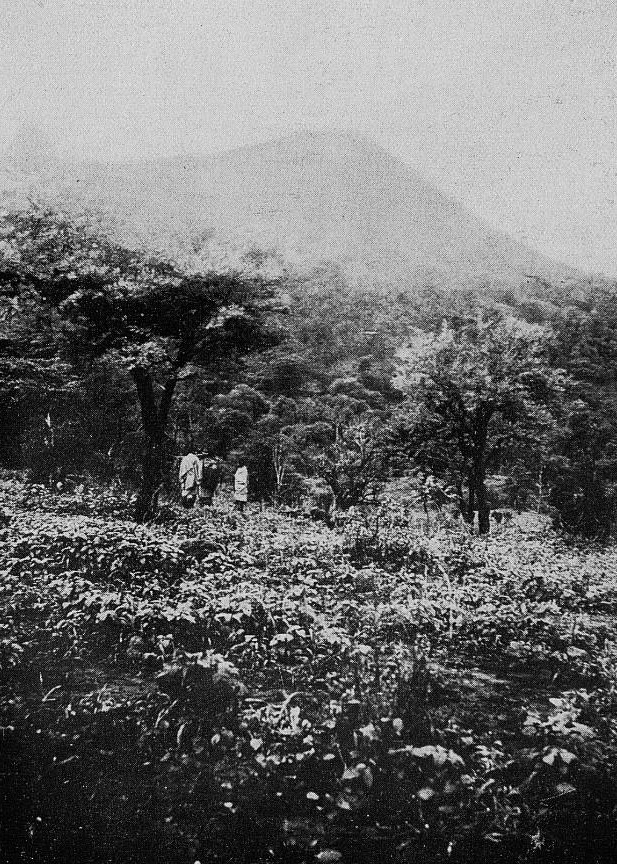
Forested area of the Mabla Mountains, c. 1930

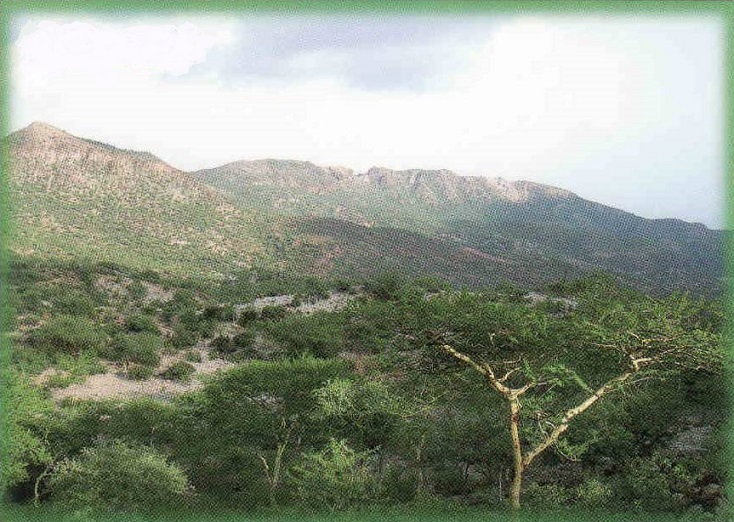
The Mabla Mountains today

The Mabla Mountains (variants: Monti Mabla, Monts Mabla) are a mountain range in the northern Obock and Tadjoura Region of Djibouti. The endemic Djibouti spurfowl makes its home here as well as in the Forêt du Day. With a mean height of 1370 metres, is the fifth highest point in Djibouti.

== Geography ==
Along with Forêt du Day, the Mabla Mountains are one of Djibouti's two remnant areas of closed forest. The range is located in the Obock Region, 25 kilometres (16 mi) west of Obock, a port town. At 4,511 feet (1,375 m) above sea level, the mountains are situated behind the coastal plain where the Red Sea meets the Gulf of Aden. They lie on the northern side of the Gulf of Tadjoura, and are characterized as a highland region.

The mountains consist of a range that extends north from near Ras Duan, a steep cliff. Accolado Mount (Assasanto), 1,204 feet (367 m) above sea level, is the north mount of the east branch of the Mabla Mountains; it is located 6 miles (9.7 km) northwest of the Latela Valley entrance. Morne Rouge, 426 feet (130 m) above sea level, is 3 miles (4.8 km) north-northwest of the valley entrance. It has three round summits which are formed of reddish stones. Morne Blanc, 1 mile (1.6 km) west-southwestof Morne Rouge, is a cone of a greyish appearance. Pic du Hussard (Aramuda) 2,612 feet (796 m) high is 14 miles (23 km) north of Ras Duan; it has a large, rounded summit. Minerva's Face, 1.4 miles (2.3 km) south-southeast of Pic du Hussard has three summits, the highest of which is 2,392 feet (729 m) high. Devil's Chair, 4 miles (6.4 km) southeast of Minerva's Face, is 1,424 feet (434 m) high and clearly visible from seaward.

The annual rainfall measures approximately 20 inches (510 mm).

== Culture ==
An Afar people subgroup, Ma`andiyta (or "White"; or Mandita) stayed in the Mabla Mountains, while the Ma`andiyta of Immino (or Awsa, or Aussa, or Assaw; or "Red") did not. The Mandita are located west of the Mabla Mountains. Another Afar subgroup, the Debne, were settled in the Mabla also. Yet another tribe is the Basooma.

The dabou, a permanent stone dwelling, is found in certain high ground regions, such as the Mabla and Goda Mountains, as well as in Ethiopia with the Afar.

== Flora and fauna ==
The endemic, critically endangered Djibouti spurfowl was first recorded here in 1985, with the nearby Forêt du Day being its only other location. Other native resident birds include Hemprich's hornbill (Lophoceros hemprichii), eastern yellow-billed hornbill (Tockus flavirostris), black-throated barbet (Tricholaema melanocephala), Abyssinian white-eye (Zosterops abyssinicus), Somali starling (Onychognathus blythii), and shining sunbird (Cinnyris habessinicus).

In the 1920s, the mountains were thickly covered with trees. The flora includes box (Buxus hildebrandtii) and acacias, as well as groves of the Bankoualé palm (Livistona carinensis) in ravines. Higher elevations of 1,300–1,600 metres (4,300–5,200 ft) are home to African juniper (Juniperus procera) forest that include tall arborescent Euphorbia, and flowering herbs such as forget-me-not. Near the summit can be found ferns.

The Djibouti spurfowl

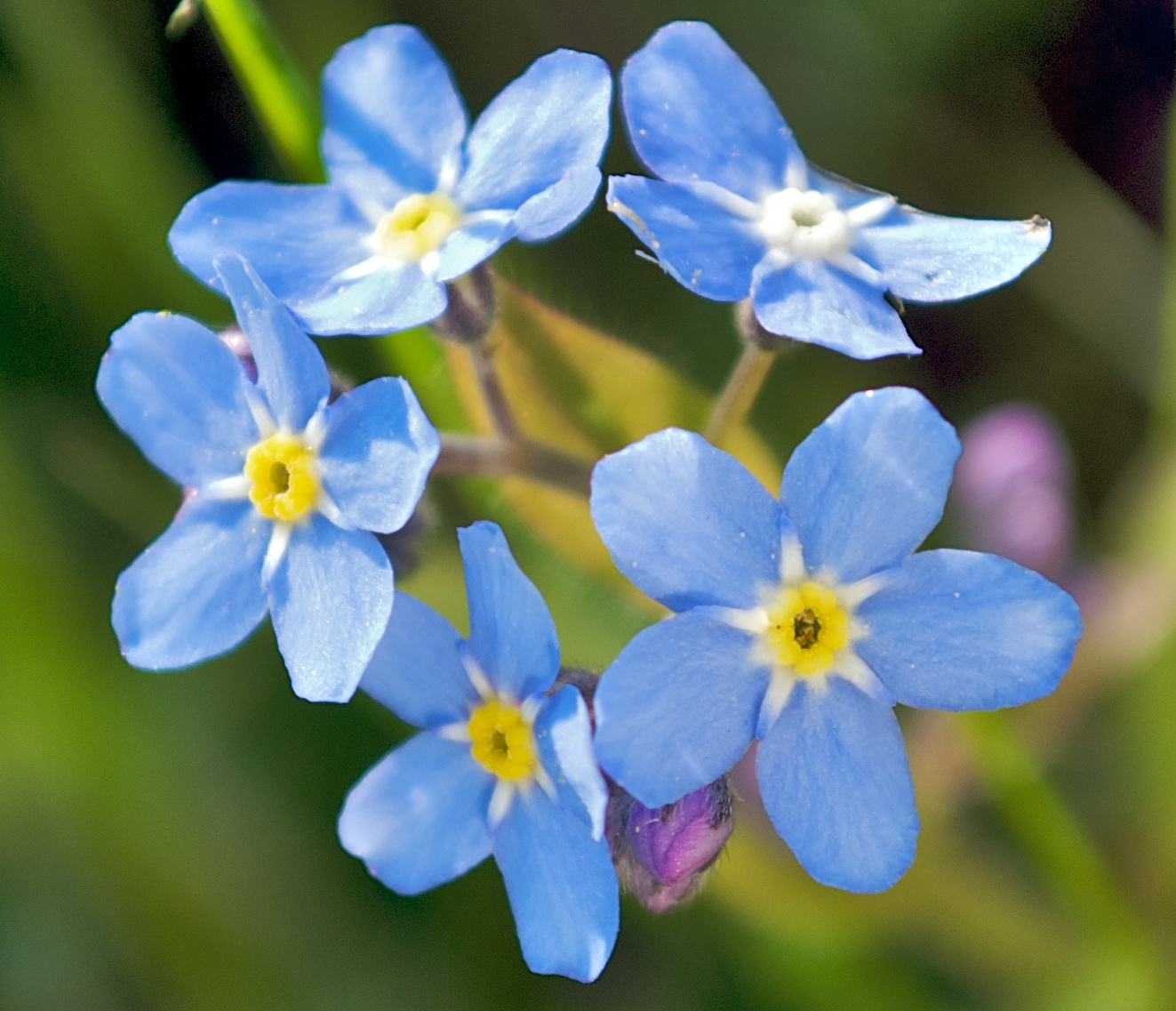
Myosotis (or Forget-me-not).

=== Conservation ===
In recent years, the forest has been damaged severely, chiefly through forest fires, the grazing of cattle, the felling of its trees, as well as military requirements. In the 1980s, a proposal was made to establish a national park in the mountains' Goula Region.

== Climate ==
Mabla Mountains enjoys a mild climate throughout the winter and moderately sunny summer.

Climate data for Mabla Mountains
Month	Jan	Feb	Mar	Apr	May	Jun	Jul	Aug	Sep	Oct	Nov	Dec	Year
Mean daily maximum °C (°F)	19.8 (67.6)	20.1 (68.2)	21.3 (70.3)	23.0 (73.4)	25.9 (78.6)	30.0 (86.0)	32.8 (91.0)	32.3 (90.1)	28.3 (82.9)	24.2 (75.6)	21.9 (71.4)	20.4 (68.7)	25.0 (77.0)
Mean daily minimum °C (°F)	12.6 (54.7)	13.6 (56.5)	14.9 (58.8)	16.4 (61.5)	18.0 (64.4)	20.4 (68.7)	22.2 (72.0)	21.7 (71.1)	19.9 (67.8)	16.7 (62.1)	14.2 (57.6)	12.7 (54.9)	16.9 (62.5)
Average precipitation mm (inches)	39 (1.5)	49 (1.9)	53 (2.1)	38 (1.5)	29 (1.1)	9 (0.4)	37 (1.5)	75 (3.0)	68 (2.7)	42 (1.7)	37 (1.5)	28 (1.1)	504 (20)
Source: Climate Data
