= Ribta =

Ribta ريتبا
- Town
- Location in Djibouti
- Coordinates: 12°27′24″N 42°50′46″E
- Country: Djibouti
- Region: Obock
- Elevation: 293 m (961 ft)

Ribta (Arabic: ريتبا) is a town in the northern Obock region of Djibouti. The area was marred by conflict in the 1990s. A "Bonfire for Peace" was held in Ribta to destroy weapons used in conflict in the region. Geologically a tectonic movement in the past has been referred to as the Ribta Formation.
