= National Highway 9 (Djibouti) =

Road in Djibouti

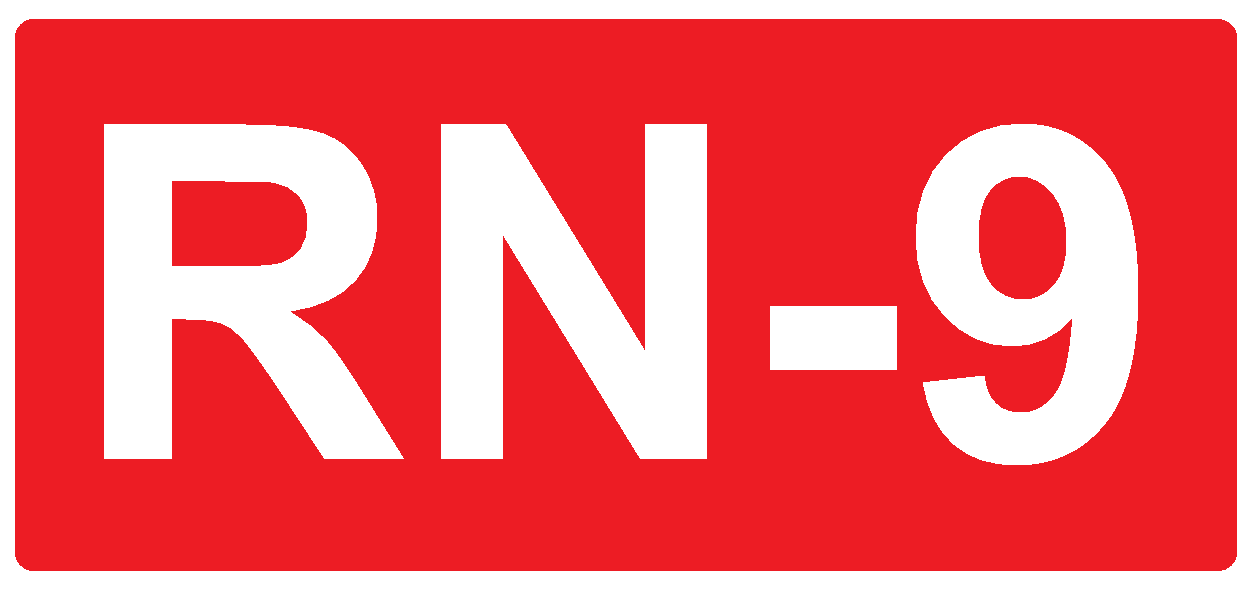
National Highway 9
- Arabic: الطريق السريع الوطنى 9 French: Route Nationale 9
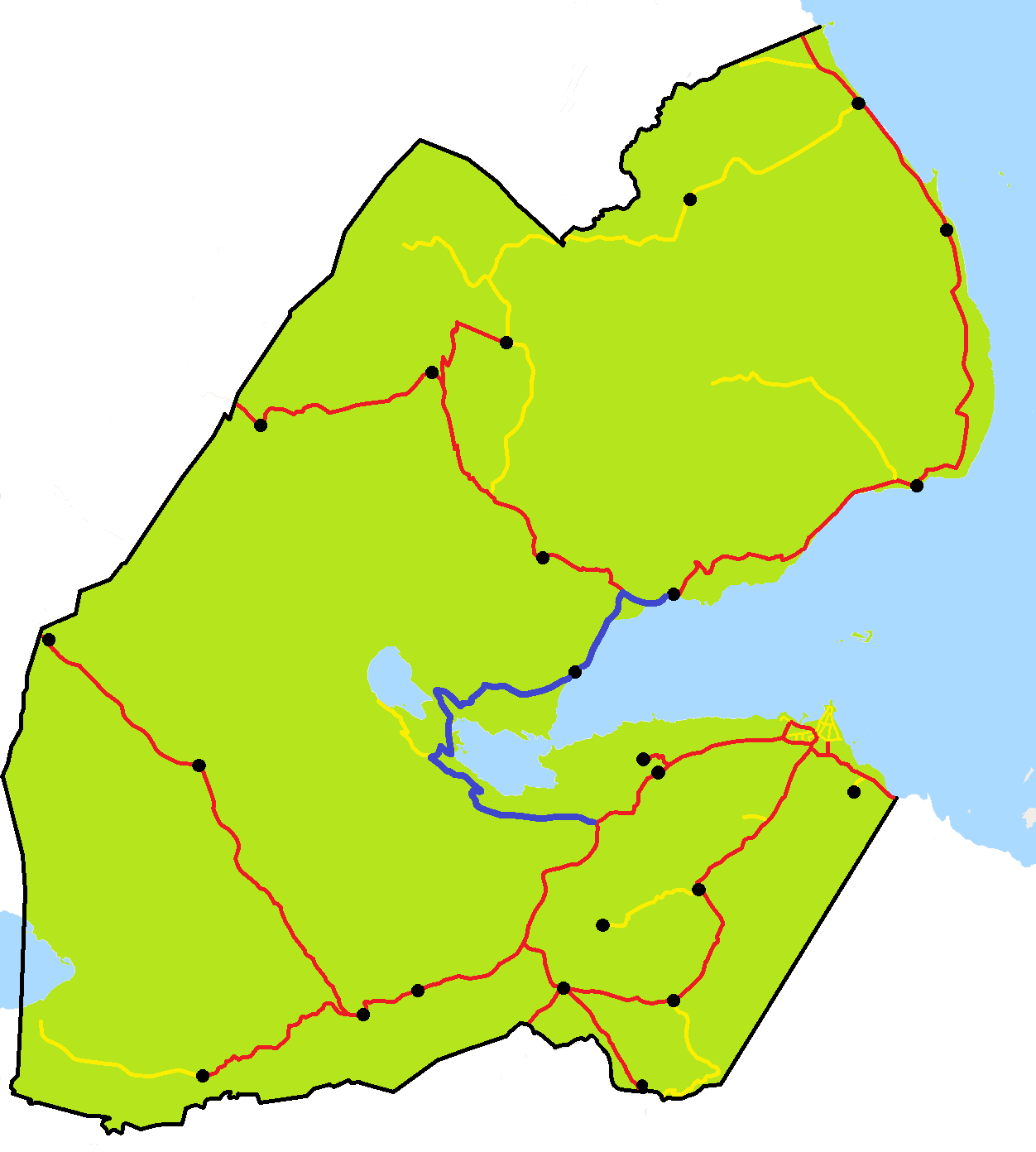

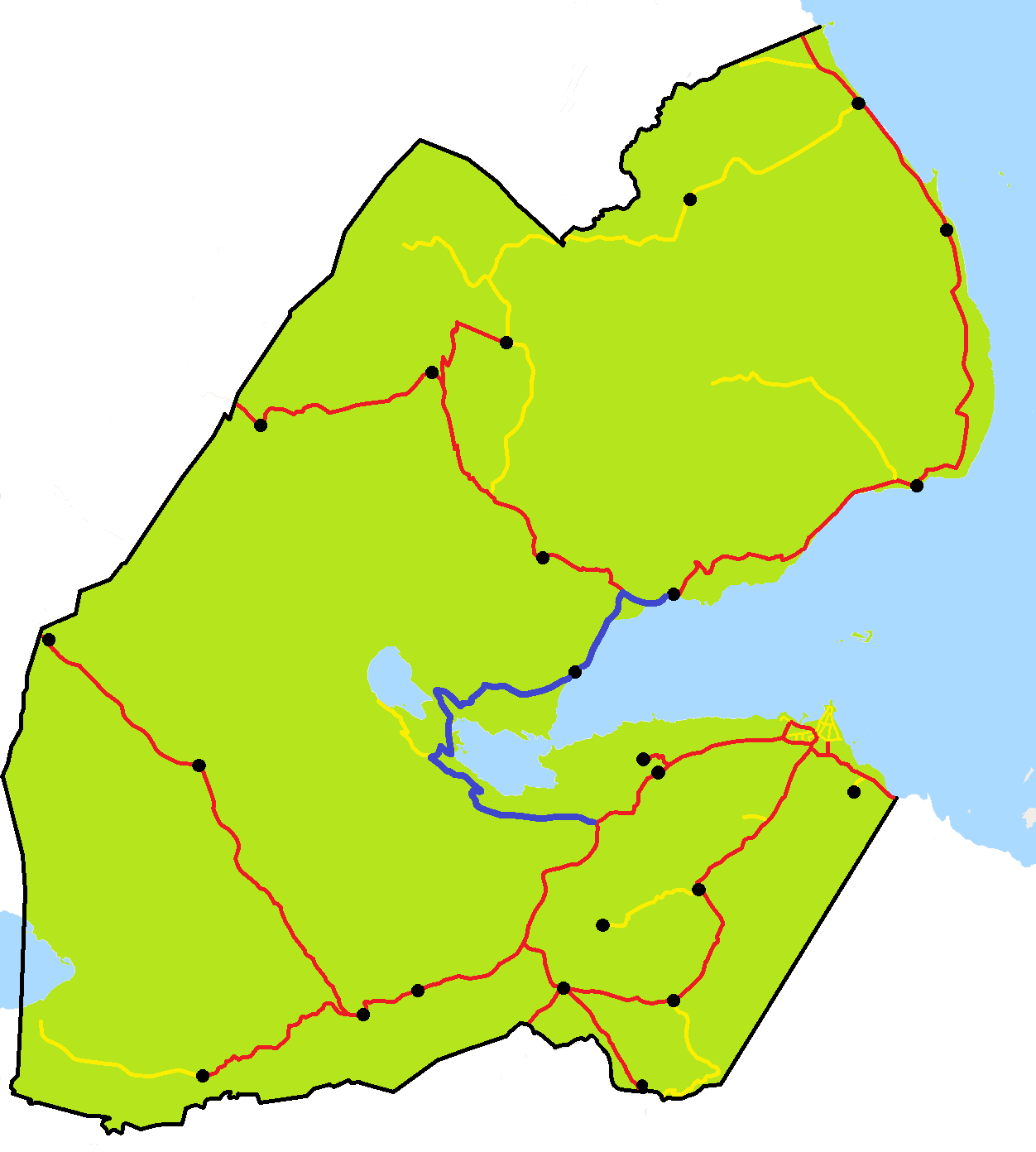

Route information
- Length: 123 km (76 mi)
- Existed: 1988–present

Major junctions
- From: Junction with National Highway 1
- To: Tadjoura

Location
- Country: Djibouti
- Major cities: Koussour, Sagallo, Ambabbo

Highway system
- Transport in Djibouti

RN-9 National Highway is a national highway in the center of Djibouti. At 123 km long, it is the second longest highway in Djibouti, after the National Highway 1.
