= Sedorre =

Sedorre سيدور
- Town
- Location in Djibouti
- Coordinates: 12°22′N 43°11′E
- Country: Djibouti
- Region: Obock

Sedorre (Arabic: سيدور) is a town in the northern Obock region of Djibouti.
