= Herkale Airport =

Airport in Djibouti

- IATA: none; ICAO: HDHE

Summary
- Airport type: Public
- Operator: Directorate of Civil Aviation and Meteorology
- Serves: Khôr ‘Angar, Djibouti
- Elevation AMSL: 38 ft / 12 m
- Coordinates: 12°26′30″N 43°17′30″E

Map
- Location of the airport in Djibouti

Runways
Direction	Length		Surface
Direction	m	ft	Surface
01/19	1,485	4,872	Dirt
- Source: GCM

Herkale Airport (ICAO: HDHE) is an airstrip 7 kilometres (4 mi) northwest of the hamlet of Khôr ‘Angar in Djibouti. Khôr ‘Angar is by the Bab-el-Mandeb strait, the entrance to the Red Sea.

== See also ==
- Transport in Djibouti
- List of airports in Djibouti
