= Egahlou =

Egahlou Ouaddi إغالو
- Town
- Location in Djibouti
- Coordinates: 12°07′N 42°56′E
- Country: Djibouti
- Region: Obock
- Elevation: 458 m (1,503 ft)

Population
  - Total: 1,512

Egahlou (also Ouaddi, Arabic: إغالو) is a town located in central Obock Region of Djibouti.

== Ecology ==
Although there is sparse vegetation in the vicinity, there is some history of animal life in the past.

== Climate ==
Egahlou has a hot arid climate (BWh) in Köppen-Geiger system, with the influence of mountain climate.

Climate data for Egahlou
Month	Jan	Feb	Mar	Apr	May	Jun	Jul	Aug	Sep	Oct	Nov	Dec	Year
Mean daily maximum °C (°F)	25.2 (77.4)	25.5 (77.9)	27.4 (81.3)	29.4 (84.9)	32.7 (90.9)	36.1 (97.0)	37.0 (98.6)	36.1 (97.0)	33.9 (93.0)	30.3 (86.5)	27.5 (81.5)	25.6 (78.1)	30.6 (87.0)
Mean daily minimum °C (°F)	16.8 (62.2)	17.7 (63.9)	18.9 (66.0)	20.9 (69.6)	23.5 (74.3)	26.6 (79.9)	26.1 (79.0)	25.5 (77.9)	25.2 (77.4)	21.2 (70.2)	18.9 (66.0)	17.4 (63.3)	21.6 (70.8)
Average rainfall mm (inches)	23 (0.9)	22 (0.9)	20 (0.8)	21 (0.8)	12 (0.5)	3 (0.1)	14 (0.6)	23 (0.9)	21 (0.8)	12 (0.5)	30 (1.2)	19 (0.7)	220 (8.7)
Source: Climate-Data.org
