= Interstate 15W =

Interstate 15W or I-15W were former designations for one of the following:

- Interstate 15 (California) (temporary route while I-15 was under construction)
- Interstate 86 (former designation)
