= Assa-Gueyla Airport =

Airport in Tadjourah, Djibouti

- IATA: none; ICAO: HDAG

Summary
- Airport type: Public
- Serves: `Assa Gaila
- Location: Djibouti
- Elevation AMSL: 2,050 ft / 625 m
- Coordinates: 12°11′20″N 42°38′15″E

Map
- Location of the airport in Djibouti

Runways
Direction	Length		Surface
Direction	ft	m	Surface
17/35	4,615	1,405	Dirt
- Source: Google Maps

Assa-Gueyla Airport (ICAO: HDAG) is an airstrip serving the village of `Assa Gaila in the Tadjourah Region of Djibouti.
