= ATC code A15 =

ATC code A15 Appetite stimulants is a therapeutic subgroup of the Anatomical Therapeutic Chemical Classification System, a system of alphanumeric codes developed by the World Health Organization (WHO) for the classification of drugs and other medical products. Subgroup A15 is part of the anatomical group A Alimentary tract and metabolism.

Codes for veterinary use (ATCvet codes) can be created by placing the letter Q in front of the human ATC code: for example, QA15.
National versions of the ATC classification may include additional codes not present in this list, which follows the WHO version.

This group is empty.

== See also ==
- Appetite stimulants
