= Waddi, Djibouti =

Waddi, Djibouti وادي
- Town
- Location in Djibouti
- Coordinates: 12°21′16″N 42°55′35″E
- Country: Djibouti
- Region: Obock
- Elevation: 285 m (935 ft)

Population
  - Total: 3,500

Waddi (Arabic: وادي) is a town in the northern Obock region of Djibouti.
