= ʽAssa Gaila =

ʽAssa Gaila أسا غايلا
- Town
- Location in Djibouti
- Coordinates: 12°11′N 42°38′E
- Country: Djibouti
- Region: Tadjoura
- Elevation: 615 m (2,018 ft)

Population
  - Total: 672

ʽAssa Gaila (Arabic: أسا غايلا) is a town in the northern Tadjoura region of Djibouti. It is a population center for the northern area, a frontier town with about 675 people. It is situated about 51 kilometres (30 miles) north of Tadjoura and 20 km (12 mi) south of the border with Eritrea.

== History ==
Due to regional conflict in the early 1990s, government soldiers were considering evacuating the territory between the town and Randa. On the 5 July 1993, the government launched a massive counter-offensive in the areas controlled by the rebels: the main FRUD base, located in Assa-Gueyla, fell into the hands of the government, who regained a lot of land including the towns of Balho, Dorra and Randa, forcing the rebels to take refuge in the mountains on the border with Eritrea in the north.

== Geography and Wildlife ==
Assa Gaila is located 20 kilometers from the border with Eritrea, and approximately 77 kilometers from Tadjoura. It is also connected by road to Dorra. The town is served by the Assa-Gueyla Airport. Local flora and fauna include spotted hyenas, acacia and Hyphaene thebaica palm.

=== Climate ===
Assa Gaila has a hot desert climate (BWh) in Köppen-Geiger system, with the influence of mountain climate, the seasonal difference is minor.

Climate data for Assa Gaila
Month	Jan	Feb	Mar	Apr	May	Jun	Jul	Aug	Sep	Oct	Nov	Dec	Year
Mean daily maximum °C (°F)	26.3 (79.3)	26.6 (79.9)	28.6 (83.5)	30.5 (86.9)	33.7 (92.7)	36.8 (98.2)	37.3 (99.1)	36.4 (97.5)	34.6 (94.3)	31.2 (88.2)	28.4 (83.1)	26.5 (79.7)	31.4 (88.5)
Mean daily minimum °C (°F)	17.5 (63.5)	18.5 (65.3)	19.8 (67.6)	21.6 (70.9)	24.0 (75.2)	26.9 (80.4)	26.4 (79.5)	25.9 (78.6)	25.7 (78.3)	21.9 (71.4)	19.6 (67.3)	18.2 (64.8)	22.2 (71.9)
Average rainfall mm (inches)	17 (0.7)	18 (0.7)	16 (0.6)	20 (0.8)	10 (0.4)	5 (0.2)	20 (0.8)	30 (1.2)	25 (1.0)	10 (0.4)	22 (0.9)	16 (0.6)	209 (8.3)
Source: Climate-Data.org
