= Khôr ʽAngar =

Khôr ʽAngar خور عنجر
- Town
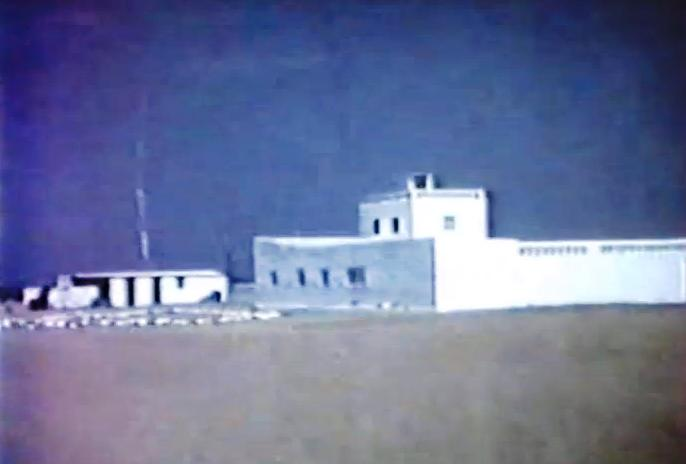
- The Khôr ʽAngar Old Fort in 1969.

- Location in Djibouti.
- Coordinates: 12°23′N 43°20′E
- Country: Djibouti
- Region: Obock
- Elevation: 10 m (33 ft)

Population (2016)
  - Total: 3,500

Khôr ʽAngar (Arabic: خور عنجر) is a town in the northern Obock Region of Djibouti, situated on the west coast of the Bab el Mandeb Strait. The town is served by Herkale Airport, a desert airstrip 7 kilometres (4 mi) northwest.

== Overview ==
Khôr ʽAngar is located in west coast of the Bab el Mandeb Strait and in the north-east of the Republic of Djibouti, 298 km (185 mi) (by road) of Djibouti City. Nearby towns and villages include Moulhoule (27 km), Obock (59 km), Rahayta (48 km).

== Climate ==
Khôr ʽAngar has a hot desert climate (Köppen: BWh). The warmest month of the year is July with an average temperature of 34.9 °C. An annual low is reached in January, when the average temperature is 26.3 °C. The difference in precipitation between the driest and wettest month is 9 mm. The average temperatures vary during the year by 8.6 °C.

Climate data for Khôr ‘Angar
Month	Jan	Feb	Mar	Apr	May	Jun	Jul	Aug	Sep	Oct	Nov	Dec	Year
Mean daily maximum °C (°F)	29.8 (85.6)	29.8 (85.6)	31.4 (88.5)	33.2 (91.8)	35.8 (96.4)	38.2 (100.8)	39.8 (103.6)	39.0 (102.2)	37.1 (98.8)	34.4 (93.9)	31.8 (89.2)	30.3 (86.5)	34.2 (93.6)
Mean daily minimum °C (°F)	22.8 (73.0)	23.4 (74.1)	24.4 (75.9)	25.8 (78.4)	27.9 (82.2)	30.0 (86.0)	30.0 (86.0)	29.4 (84.9)	29.5 (85.1)	26.5 (79.7)	24.4 (75.9)	23.3 (73.9)	26.5 (79.6)
Average rainfall mm (inches)	5 (0.2)	4 (0.2)	8 (0.3)	3 (0.1)	1 (0.0)	0 (0)	4 (0.2)	6 (0.2)	9 (0.4)	4 (0.2)	7 (0.3)	6 (0.2)	57 (2.3)
Source: Climate-Data.org, altitude: 10m
