= Marcos Díaz (swimmer) =

Dominican swimmer (born 1975)

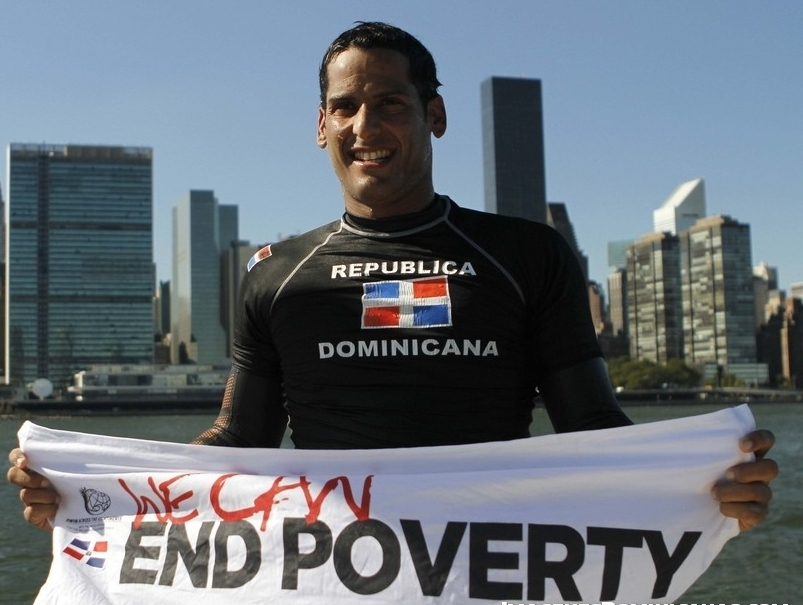

Personal information
- Full name: Marcos Aurelio Díaz Domínguez
- Nationality: Dominican
- Born: January 12, 1975 (age 51) Santo Domingo, Dominican Republic

Sport
- Sport: Swimming

Marcos Aurelio Díaz Domínguez (born January 12, 1975) is a Dominican ultra-distance swimmer of open waters. He is the first swimmer to unite all five continents in the world by swimming. His achievements include, crossing the English Channel in 2004. In 2005 he crossed the stretch of Gibraltar twice. In the year 2006, he competed in the turbulent waters of the Bhagirathi River, where he won first place. In 2007 he swam around the island of Manhattan twice. Finally, in 2010 he completed a feat in which he swam across all five continents in promotion of the United Nations Millennium Development Goals.

In 2011 Marcos Díaz was inducted in the International Marathon Swimming Hall of Fame, class of 2012.
