= Balho =

Balho بالهو
- Town
- Location in Djibouti
- Coordinates: 12°03′N 42°12′E
- Country: Djibouti
- Region: Tadjoura

Balho (Arabic: بالهو) is a town located in the Tadjourah region of Djibouti. It is situated on the RN-11 highway. It is situated about 32 kilometres (20 miles) west of Dorra and 6 km (4 mi) east of the Ethiopian border.

== History ==
In Balho are found 10,000 years old rock paintings. These were in 1974 in the former French territory of Afars and Issas used as a stamp motifs. 1991 joined in Balho three Afar opposition groups to Front for the Restoration of Unity and Democracy (FRUD) together, in the Djiboutian Civil War fought against the government. In 1993 the army Balho, Dorra and Randa recapture and FRUD relegate to the north.

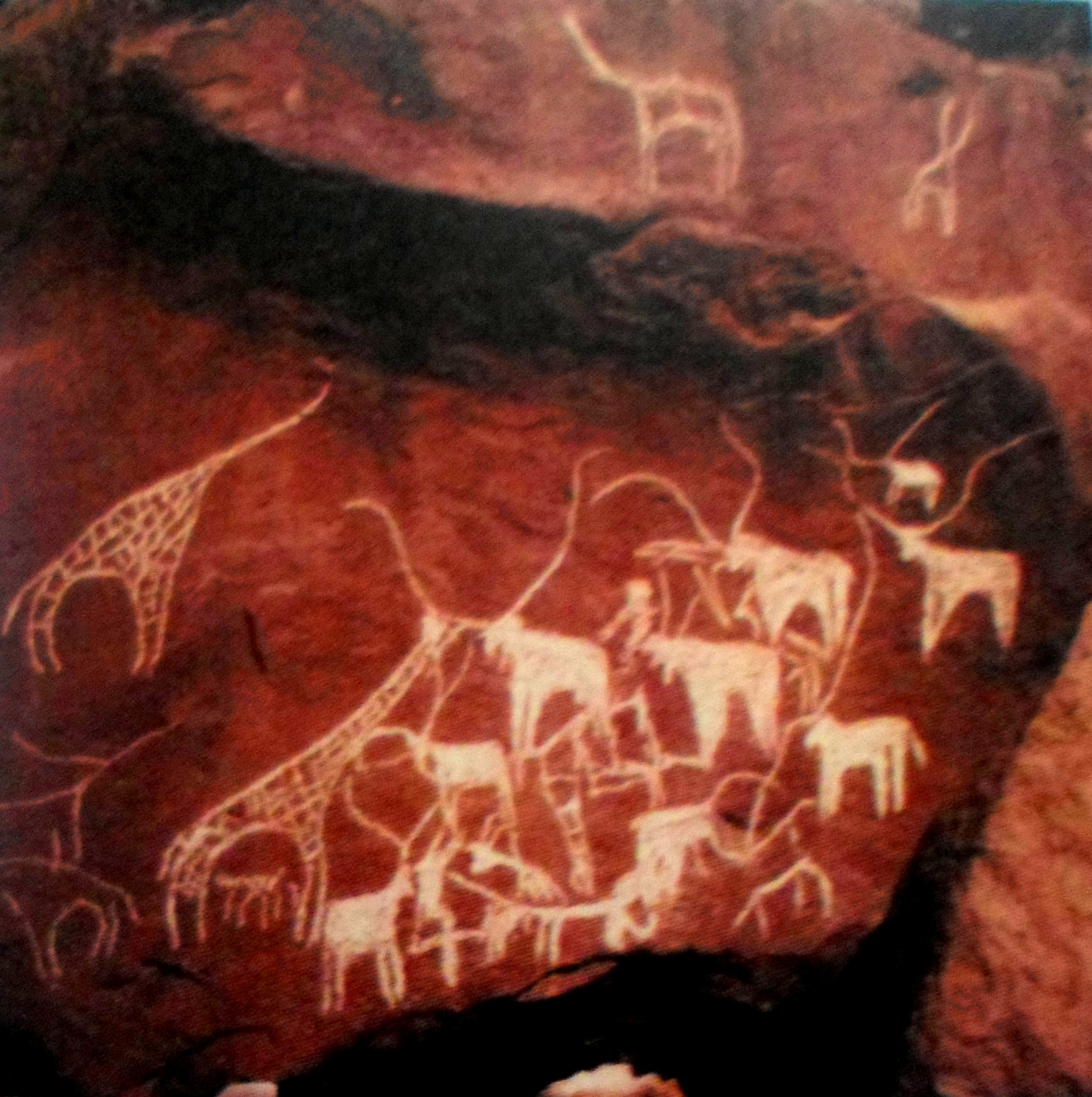
Rock art at Balho

== Climate ==
Climate data for Balho
Month	Jan	Feb	Mar	Apr	May	Jun	Jul	Aug	Sep	Oct	Nov	Dec	Year
Average precipitation mm (inches)	2 (0.1)	5 (0.2)	2 (0.1)	11 (0.4)	8 (0.3)	3 (0.1)	28 (1.1)	44 (1.7)	32 (1.3)	9 (0.4)	0 (0)	1 (0.0)	145 (5.7)
Source: The Weather Channel
