= Bissidiro =

Bissidiro بيسيديرو
- Town
- Location in Djibouti
- Coordinates: 12°38′N 42°59′E
- Country: Djibouti
- Region: Obock
- Elevation: 67 m (220 ft)

Bissidiro (Arabic: بيسيديرو) is a town in the northern Obock region of Djibouti. It is situated on the border with Eritrea about 351 km (218 mi) (by road) from Djibouti City.
