= List of A15 roads =

This is a list of roads designated A15. Entries are sorted in alphabetical order by name of country.

- A015 road (Argentina), a road connecting the junction with National Route 14 at La Criolla and the Salto Grande Dam access-road
- A15 road (Australia) may refer to:
  - New England Highway, a highway in the Hunter Valley and New England regions
  - Tapleys Hill Road, a road in the western suburbs of Adelaide
- A15 motorway (Belgium), a road connecting La Louvière and Liège
- A15 motorway (France), a road connecting Gennevilliers, Hauts-de-Seine and Cergy-Pontoise, Val d'Oise
- A 15 motorway (Germany), a road connecting Berlin and the German-Polish border
- A15 motorway (Italy), a road connecting Parma and La Spezia
- A15 road (Latvia), a road around Rēzekne
- A15 highway (Lithuania), a road connecting Vilnius and Lyda
- A15 road (Malaysia), a road in Perak connecting Batu Gajah and Kampung Gajah
- A15 motorway (Netherlands), a road connecting Rotterdam and the interchange Ressen
- A15 motorway (Portugal), a road connecting Caldas da Rainha and Óbidos
- A-15 expressway (Québec), a road connecting the United States border at Saint-Bernard-de-Lacolle and Sainte-Agathe-des-Monts through Montréal
- A-15 motorway (Spain), a road connecting Tudela and San Sebastián
- A 15 road (Sri Lanka), a road connecting Batticaloa and Trincomalee
- A15 road (United Kingdom) may refer to:
  - A15 road (England), a road connecting Peterborough and the junction with the M180 near Scawby
  - A15 road (Isle of Man), or Maughold road
- A15 road (United States of America) may refer to:
  - County Route A15 (California), a road in Plumas County connecting SR 89, SR 36, and SR 70 in Portola

== See also ==
- List of highways numbered 15
