= List of highways numbered 15A =

The following highways are numbered 15A:

== United States ==
- Florida State Road 15A
  - County Road 15A (Volusia County, Florida)
- Nebraska Spur 15A
- New York State Route 15A
  - County Route 15A (Cayuga County, New York)
  - County Route 15A (Genesee County, New York)
- South Dakota Highway 15A
- Vermont Route 15A
- Secondary State Highway 15A (Washington) (former)
