= Obock Region =

Region of Djibouti

Obock Region Afar: Rakaakay Obock Somali: Gobolka Obock Arabic: إقليم أوبوخ
- Region (Gobolka - Rakaakay)
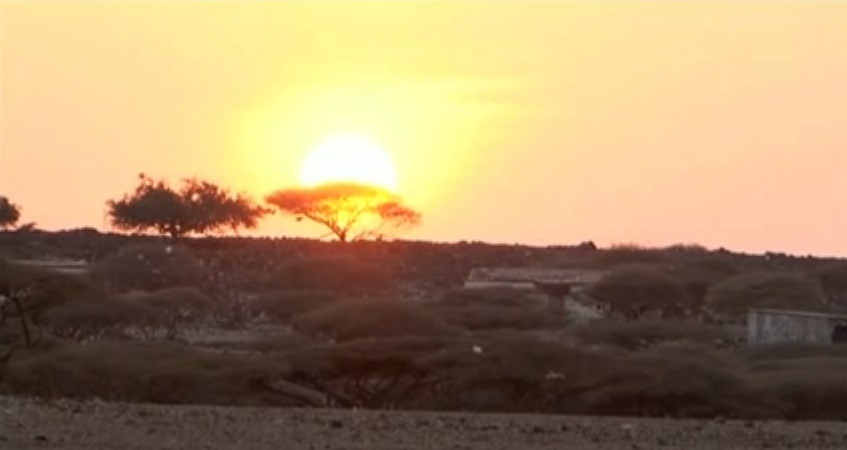

- Coordinates: 11°58′N 43°18′E
- Country: Djibouti
- Administrative centre: Obock

Area
  - Total: 4,700 km^{2} (1,800 sq mi)

Population (2024 census)
  - Total: 37,666
  - Density: 8.0/km^{2} (21/sq mi)
- ISO 3166 code: DJ-OB

The Obock Region (Afar: Rakaakay Obock, Arabic: إقليم أوبوخ, Somali: Gobolka Obokh) is a region in northern Djibouti. Covering an area of 4,700 square kilometres (1,800 sq mi), it had an estimated population of 37,856 as of 2009.The region borders the Red Sea, Bab-el-Mandeb, Gulf of Aden, Gulf of Tadjoura, and includes the Seven Brothers, Doumeira Islands, and the coastal city of Obock. It also shares a section of Djibouti’s northern border with Eritrea. Geographically, Obock is larger than Cape Verde but smaller than Trinidad and Tobago, featuring a mix of highland and coastal plains.

== History ==
In the mid-19th century and earlier, the area now known as the Obock Region was governed by Afar sultans, local rulers with whom France signed a series of treaties between 1862 and 1887 to establish a colonial presence. On March 11, 1862, afar from an agreement in Paris, ceding the territory of Oblock to France for 10,000 thalaris ( approximately 55,000 francs), marking the official establishment of the Oblock Territory. French subsequently developed Obock into a colonial port, while Italy established its own port to the north in Assab.

The Obock Region became a separate administrative entity in 1927, with Michel Azenor appointed as its first administrator.

== Geography ==
The region covers an area of 4,700 square kilometres (1,800 sq mi). It is bordered by Eritrea to the north, the Tadjourah Region to the southwest, and the Red Sea and Gulf of Aden to the east. There are several salt-lakes on the road to Tadjoura.

The regional capital is Obock which is positioned on the Gulf of Tadjoura littoral, by the sea, by a group of beaches and flattened abraded in coral beds with a very salty sheet of water. The wooded area of the Mabla Mountains, reaching more than 1,000 m and housing the second forest of the country, constitutes the natural border between the region of Obock and that of Tadjourah. The coastline is more than a thousand kilometers long. Obock with its proximity to Yemen (less than two hours). The city has a functional airstrip and offers regular ferry services to Djibouti City. The wildlife such as hamadryas baboons, Soemmerring's gazelle, dorcas gazelle, warthog, black-backed jackal, Ruppells sandfox, dikdik, African golden wolf, hyena, Abyssinian hare, wild ass and ostriches are found in this region. African wild dog was also found in this region, but their present condition is unknown. There have been reports of cheetah occurring in this region, but there has been no evidence of their presence.

== Economy ==
The region is mainly characterized by activities focused on animal production, particularly goat and dromedary farming, as well as agricultural practices in irrigated areas and artisanal fishing along the entire coastline. Small businesses and other informal activities are also common in the town of Obock and nearby localities. The number of salaried jobs remains quite limited. The 200 fishermen in Obock are relatively well-organized under their Association of Fishermen Cooperatives of Obock.

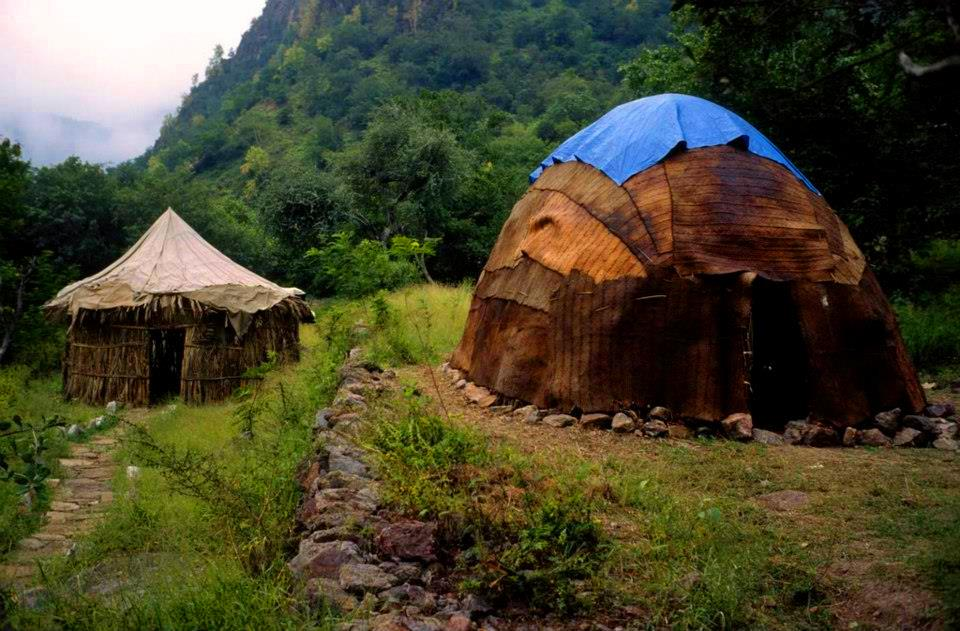
Traditional houses in the Mabla Mountains.

== Climate ==
The region is characterized by two seasons. The cool season, which runs from November to April, and the warm season which begins in May and is often more or less dry. The rare and low rainfall and endemic drought make this area one of the driest places in the country. The effects of climate change are also being felt. Sometimes it is hot and dry and sooner or later than usual. Sometimes it makes cool and wet longer or shorter, later or earlier than expected.

The annual mean statistics for some Tadjoura Region centres is shown below:

Town	Min. Temp	Max. Temp	Rainfall
Khôr ‘Angar	22.8 °C (73.0 °F)	39.8 °C (103.6 °F)	57 mm (2.2 in)
Obock	22.3 °C (72.1 °F)	41.0 °C (105.8 °F)	80 mm (3.1 in)
Alaili Dadda`	19.6 °C (67.3 °F)	38.2 °C (100.8 °F)	135 mm (5.3 in)
Medeho	14.3 °C (57.7 °F)	35.1 °C (95.2 °F)	322 mm (12.7 in)

== Towns ==
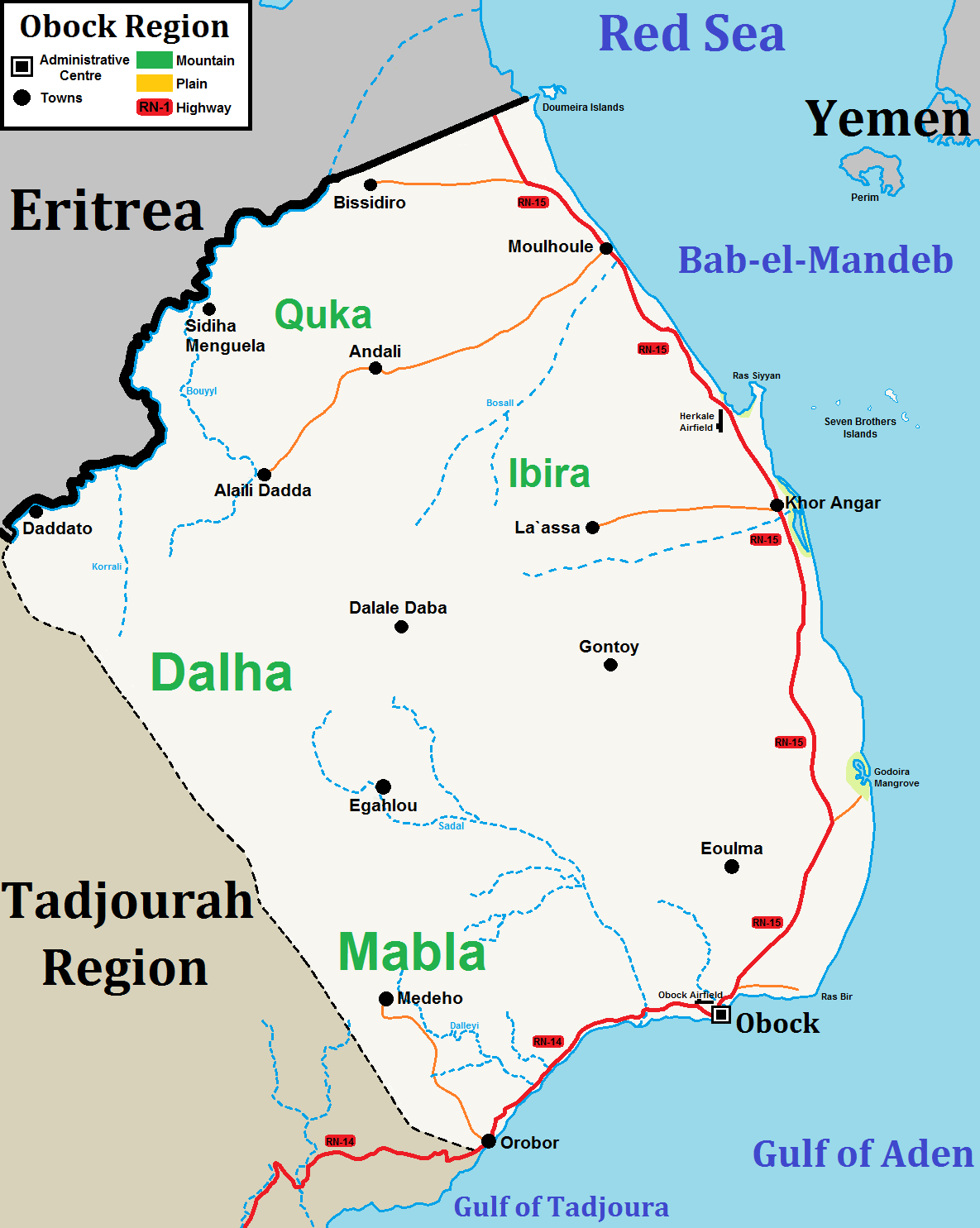
Map of the Obock Region.

Obock Region
Town names
Obock
Alaili Dadda
Medeho
Khôr ‘Angar
Moulhoule
Egahlou
Waddi
Andali
La`assa
Bissidiro
Dadda'to
Ribta
Fagal
