= Rahayta =

Rahayta راهيتا Rahaita
- Town
- Location in Eritrea.
- Coordinates: 12°43′37″N 43°5′3″E
- Country: Eritrea
- Region: Southern Red Sea
- Time zone: UTC+3 (EAT)

Rahayta, also spelled Rahaita or Raheita (Arabic: راهيتا), is a town in the Southern Red Sea region of Eritrea and was once the seat of a former sultanate.

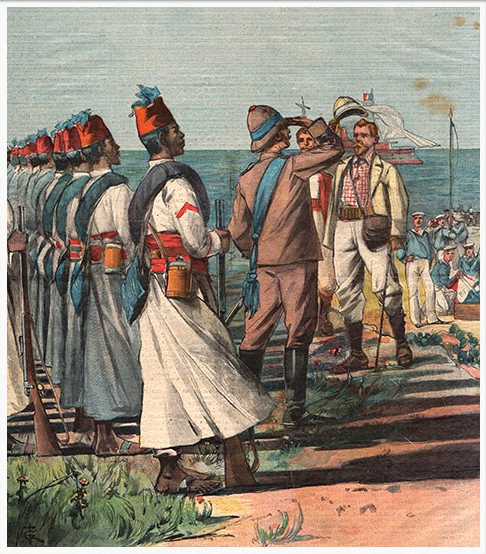
Raheita Incident (1898): French marines from the gunboat Scorpion were confronted with Italian colonial forces who have just defeated the rebellious sultan of Raheita
