= Transport in Djibouti =

Transport in Djibouti is facilitated through a relatively young system of roads, railways and ports.

== Air transport ==
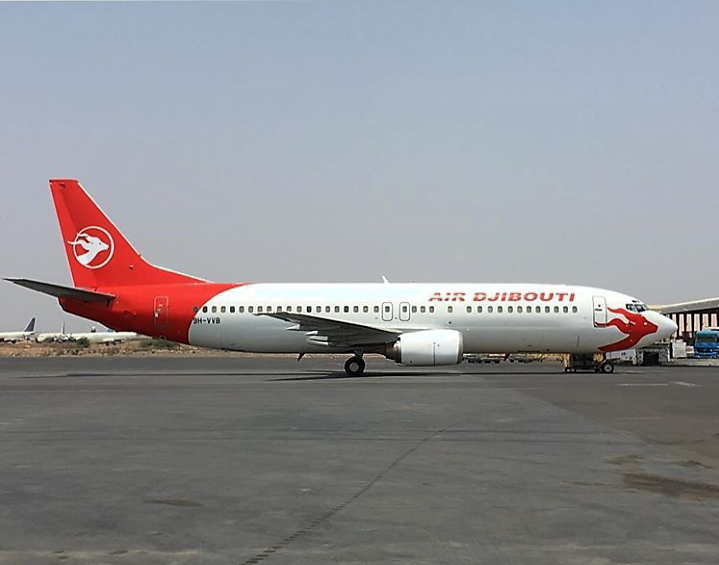
An Air Djibouti aircraft at the Djibouti–Ambouli International Airport (2016).

=== Airlines ===
The national flag carrier is Air Djibouti. In total, there are other airlines, all operating out of Djibouti–Ambouli International Airport:

- Jubba Airways

=== Airports ===
The aviation industry is regulated by the Civil Aviation Authority of Djibouti, a statutory board of the Djibouti government under the Ministry of Infrastructure & Transport.

Airport and airbase technical data
| Airport | ICAO | IATA | Usage | Runway | Length (ft) | Length (m) | Remarks |
|---|---|---|---|---|---|---|---|
| Djibouti–Ambouli International Airport | HDAM | JIB | Civilian/Military | Paved | 10335 | 3150 |
| Chabelley Airport | HDCH | none | Military | Paved | 8530 | 2600 |

== Maritime transport ==
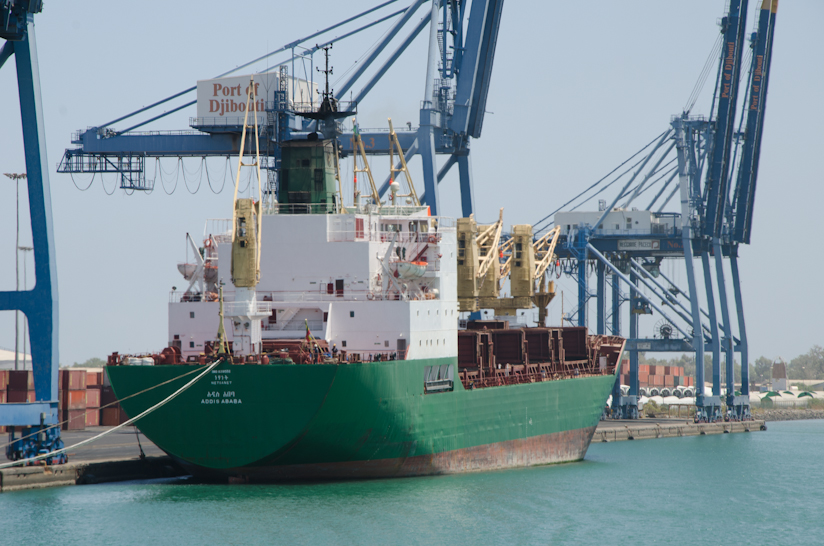
An Ethiopian cargo ship docked at the Port of Djibouti.

=== Ports and harbours ===
The Port of Djibouti, run by the Djibouti Ports & Free Zones Authority and Port of Doraleh, is a key transhipment hub for the East African region.

== Bibliography ==
- Michelon 745 Africa North East, Arabia 2007
- GeoCenter Africa North East 1999
- Maplanida.com
