= Obock =

Obock Hayyú
- Town
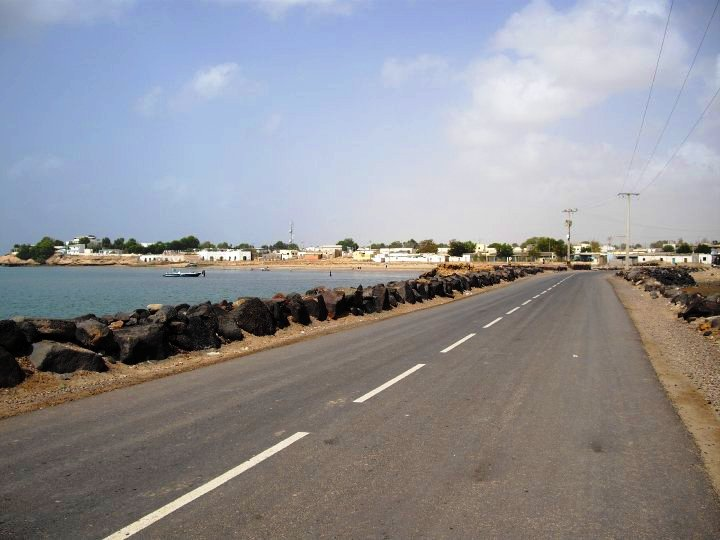

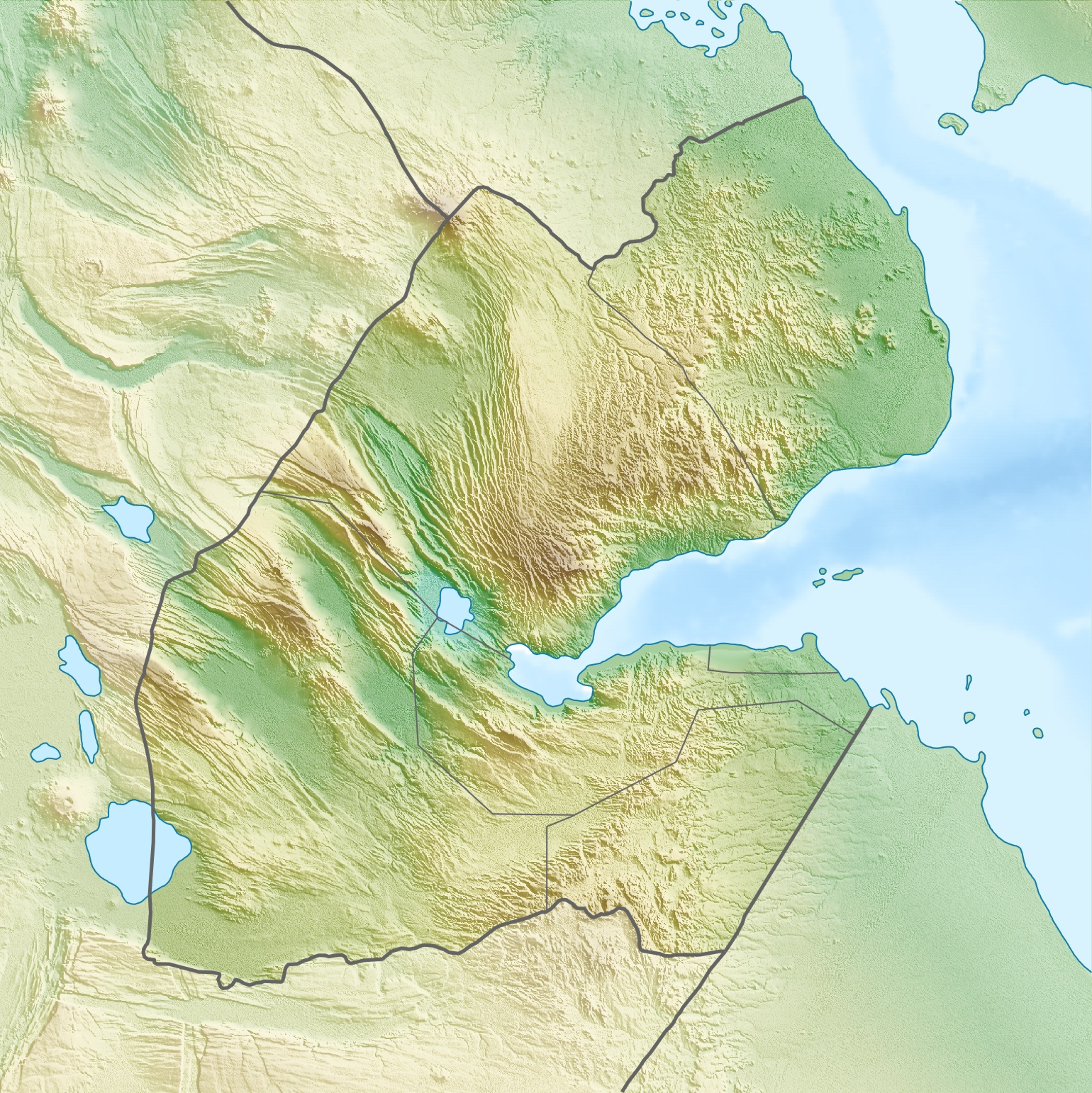
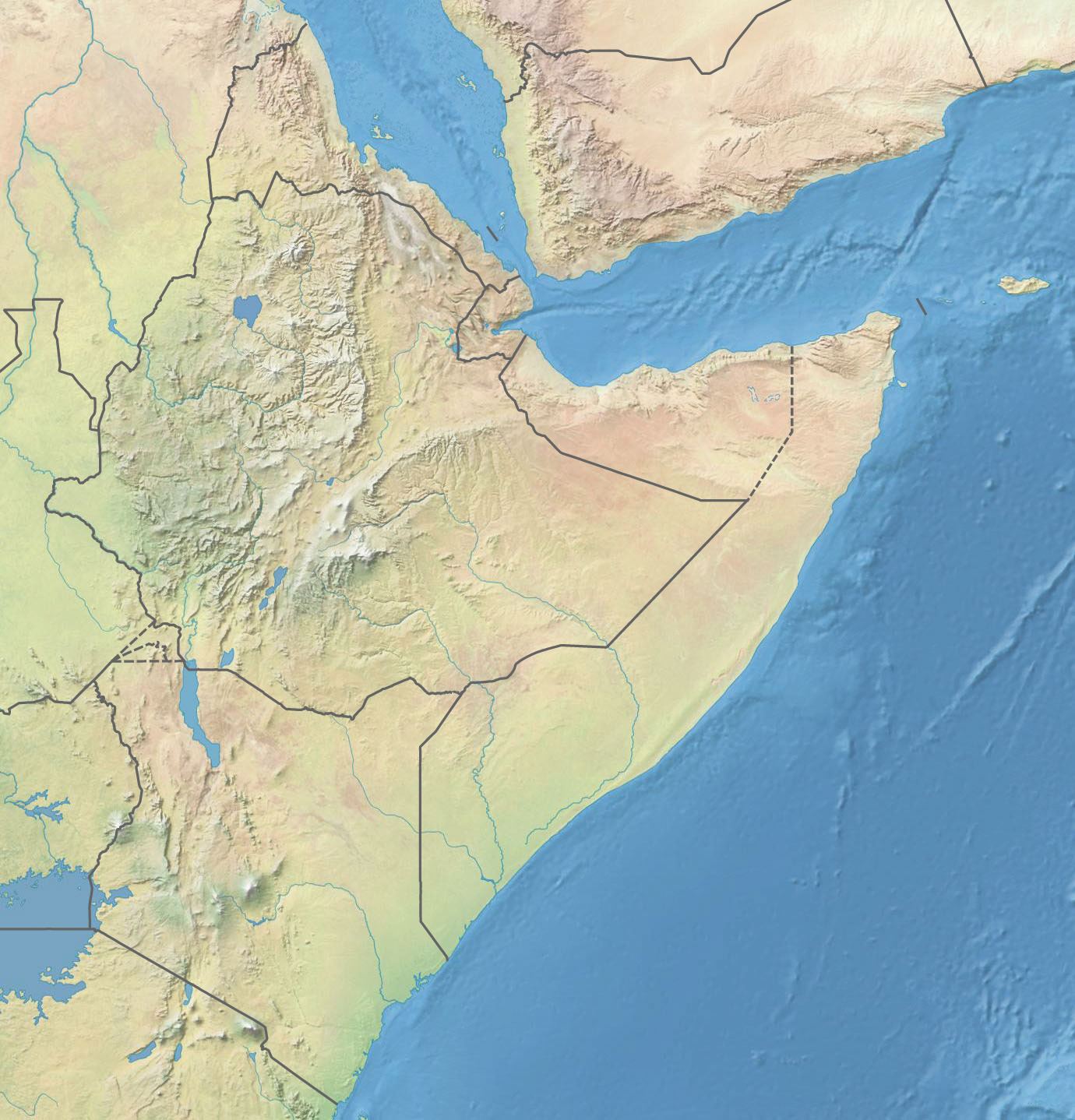
- Location within Djibouti Location within the Horn of Africa Location within Africa
- Coordinates: 11°58′N 43°17′E
- Country: Djibouti
- Region: Obock Region

Area
  - Total: 6 km^{2} (2.3 sq mi)
- Elevation: 13 m (43 ft)

Population (2024 census)
  - Total: 20,152
  - Density: 3,400/km^{2} (8,700/sq mi)

Obock (also Obok, Arabic: أبخ, Hayyú) is a small port town in Djibouti. It is located on the Northern shore of the Gulf of Tadjoura, where it opens out into the Gulf of Aden. The town is home to an airstrip and has ferries to Djibouti City. The French form Obock derives from Arabic "Oboh", which is a deformation of Oboki, a name given to a local wadi.

== History ==
The fishing village was originally built on the plateau of Dala-h Húgub near the Dar'i Wadi, with some houses constructed of mud and stone and Daboyta. Most of the inhabitants made their living through animal husbandry, fishing, commerce and used a well for drinking water. During the Middle Ages, Obock was ruled by the Ifat Sultanate and then the Adal Sultanate. The Sultans of Raheita emerged from the Adal Sultanate. Although nominally part of the Ottoman Empire since 1554, between 1821 and 1841, Muhammad Ali, Pasha of Egypt, came to control Yemen and modern-day Eritrea, and claims on Ethiopia as far as Harar. In 1884, the commander of the patrol sloop L’Inferent, a French ship, confirmed the Egyptian presence in the area around Obock. The commander of the patrol sloop Le Vaudreuil also reported that the Egyptians were occupying the interior between Obock and Tadjoura. In actuality, however, Egypt had little authority over the interior and their period of rule on the coast was brief, lasting only a few years before the Egyptian garrison was withdrawn from the area in 1862.

=== French Somaliland ===
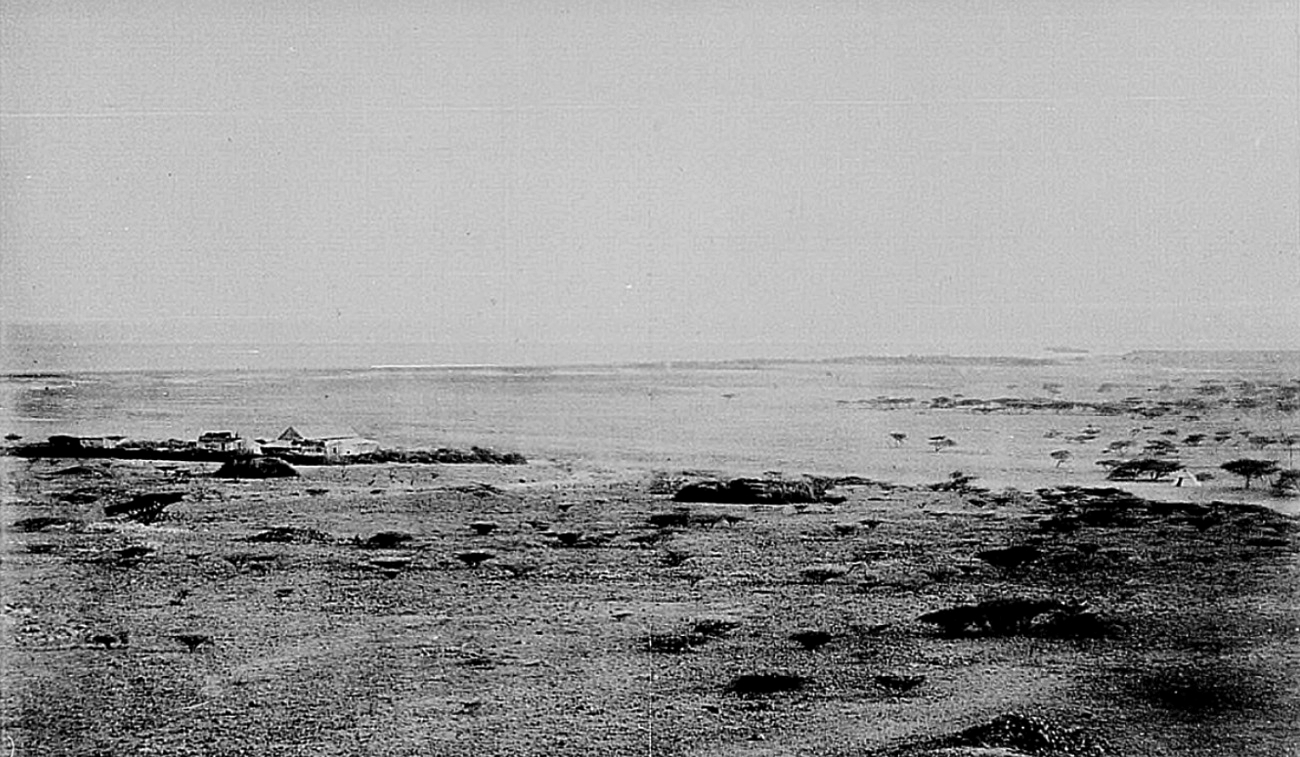
Panorama of Obock in 1882 with first French factory on the left

During the Scramble for Africa, growing French interest in the area took place against a backdrop of British activity in Egypt and the opening of the Suez Canal in 1869. Between 1883 and 1887, France signed various treaties with the then ruling Somali and Afar Sultans, which allowed it to expand the protectorate to include the Gulf of Tadjoura. Obock was originally significant as the site of the first French colony in the region, established by treaty with the local Afar rulers on March 11, 1862. The French were interested in having a coaling station for steamships, which would become especially important upon the opening of the Suez Canal in 1869. (Up to that time French ships had to buy coal at the British port of Aden across the gulf, an unwise dependency in case of war.)

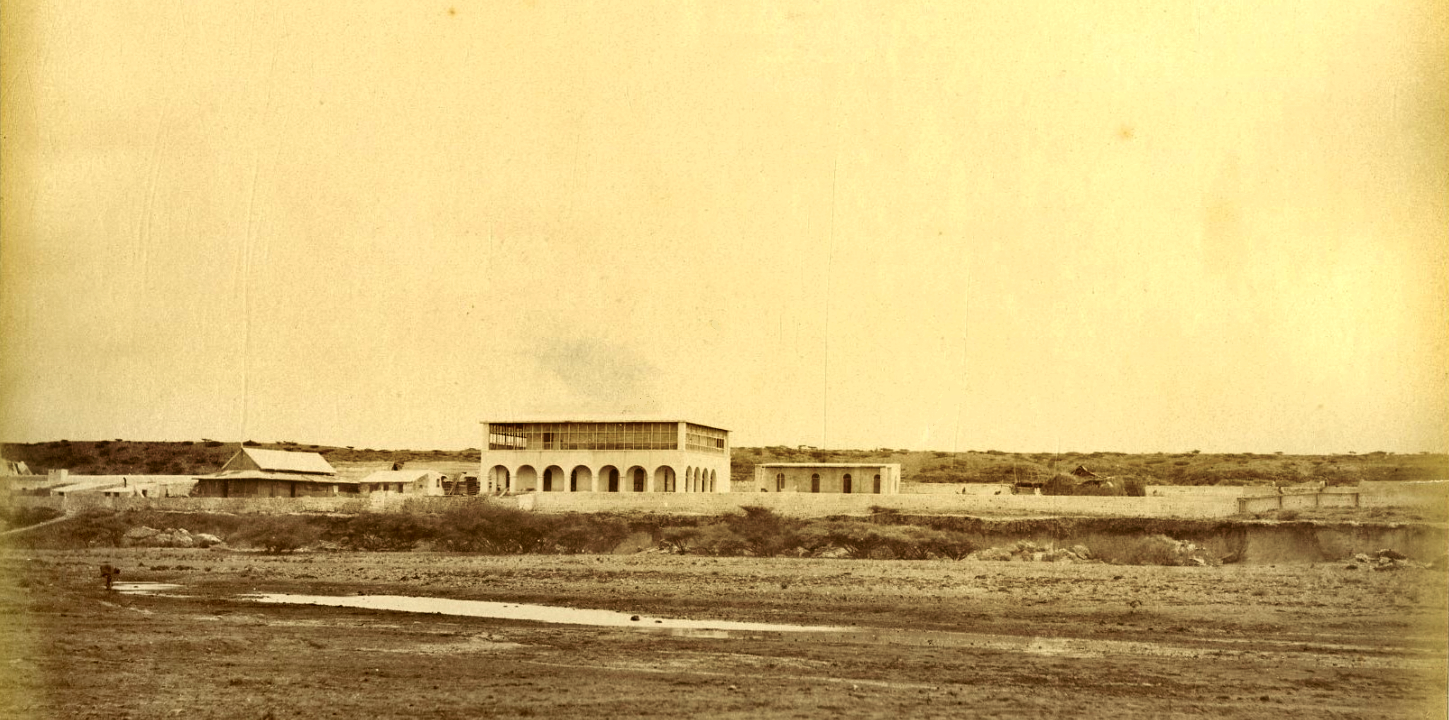
The French traders settlement and the coal depot in the mid 1880s.

The site was not the subject of any occupation, just visited by the ships of the naval divisions assigned to the Indian Ocean, until the installation of trader Pierre Arnoux in 1881, followed by Paul Soleillet. Obock became a true colony in 1884 with the arrival in August of Léonce Lagarde, who established an administration and extended French possession in the Gulf of Tadjoura, forming the Territory of Obock and outbuildings, with Obock as its capital. By 1885, Obock had 800 inhabitants and a school. However, the anchorage was more exposed than the site of Djibouti on the south side of the Gulf of Tadjoura, and the colonial administration moved there in 1894. The population of Obock subsequently declined.

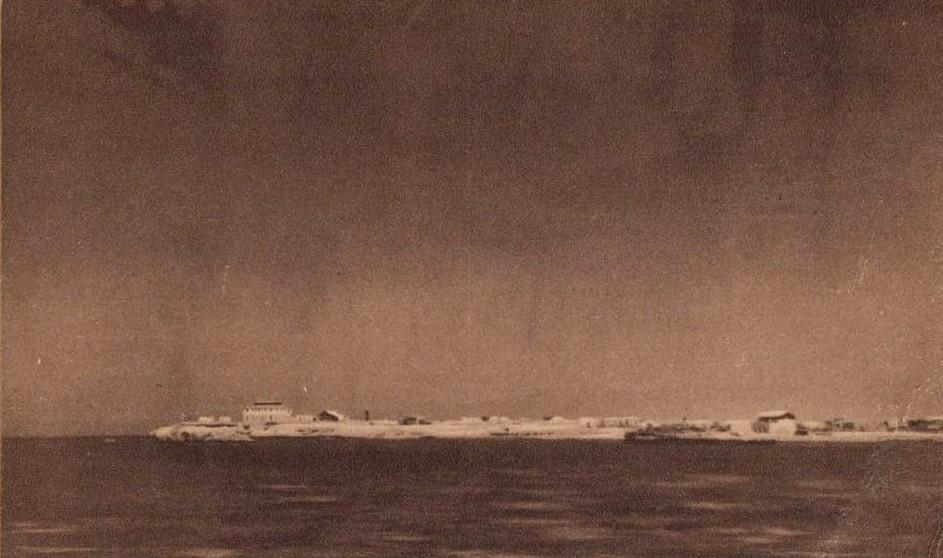
Panorama of Obock in 1920.

However, until the French occupation of Tadjoura in 1927, Obock remained the only place on the northern coast of the Gulf of Tadjoura with a colonial administrative office. It became the capital of the Dankali District in 1914, then an administrative position from 1927 which was subsumed into the "Circle of Adaels" in 1929. During World War II, Italy's declaration of war on France and Great Britain came on 10 June 1940, with them undertaking some offensive actions beginning on 18 June. From Harar Governorate, troops under General Guglielmo Nasi were sent to attack French Somaliland. There were some skirmishes. When the Vichy French government on 10 July learned that the armistice was not yet put into effect in French Somaliland, President Philippe Pétain sent General Gaëtan Germain as his personal representative to correct the situation. Negotiations at Dewele, Italian East Africa on the local implementation of the armistice were only finally completed on 8 August. By that time, the British offensive against the Italians had tightened the blockade of French Somaliland. Famine set in and malnutrition-related diseases took many lives, 70% of them women and children. Many townsfolk left for the hinterland. The locals named the blockade the carmii, a word for a type of sorghum usually reserved for cattle, which used as human food at the height of the famine. Obock became the capital of a circle responsible for resupplying the colony during the Allied blockade from 1941 to 1943. Only a few Arab dhows (boutres) managed to run the blockade to Djibouti and Obock and only two French ships from Madagascar managed to run it. The Japanese declaration of war on the Allies (7 December 1941) gave the colony some respite, since the British were forced to withdraw all but two ships from the blockade for use in the Far East.

The Commander-in-Chief, East Africa, William Platt, codenamed the negotiations for the surrender of French Somaliland "Pentagon", because there were five sides: himself, the Vichy governor, the Free French, the British minister at Addis Ababa and the United States. Christian Raimond Dupont surrendered and Colonel Raynal's troops crossed back into French Somaliland on 26 December 1942, completing its liberation. The official handover took place at 10:00 p.m. on 28 December. The first governor appointed under the Free French was André Bayardelle. A local battalion from French Somaliland participated in the Liberation of Paris in 1944. In 1963, Obock's circle was created by division of that of Tadjourah region.

=== Djibouti ===
A third independence referendum was held in the French Territory of the Afars and the Issas on 8 May 1977. The previous referendums were held in 1958 and 1967, which rejected independence. This referendum backed independence from France. A landslide 98.8% of the electorate supported disengagement from France, officially marking Djibouti's independence. Obock is expected to be the site of the Chinese naval base in Djibouti.

Obock has become a key stop in the route for illegal migration from Ethiopia to Saudi Arabia, being the location from where smugglers take migrants on boats to Yemen.

== Demographics ==
As of the 2024 census, the population of Obock was at 20,152. The town inhabitants belong to various mainly Afro-Asiatic-speaking ethnic groups. The Afar , Gadabursi and Issa Somali, are predominant.

== Postage stamps ==
During its time as a French colony, Obock issued its own postage stamps; for more detail see Postage stamps and postal history of Obock.

== Overview ==
Obock is connected to other environs by RN-14 National Highway. A ferry ride from Djibouti City to Obock takes three hours; the distance is 237 km (147 mi).

== Climate and geography ==
Obock has a dry climate. It is classified as hot and semi-arid (Köppen climate classification BSh). Obock is 13 m above sea level on the plateau of Gazelles ("Dala-h Húgub in Afar") in desert terrain. The sky is always clear and bright throughout the year.

Climate data for Obock
Month	Jan	Feb	Mar	Apr	May	Jun	Jul	Aug	Sep	Oct	Nov	Dec	Year
Mean daily maximum °C (°F)	28.9 (84.0)	29.0 (84.2)	30.8 (87.4)	32.8 (91.0)	35.4 (95.7)	38.6 (101.5)	41.0 (105.8)	39.9 (103.8)	37.0 (98.6)	33.8 (92.8)	31.0 (87.8)	29.5 (85.1)	34.0 (93.1)
Mean daily minimum °C (°F)	22.3 (72.1)	23.3 (73.9)	24.6 (76.3)	26.0 (78.8)	28.2 (82.8)	30.7 (87.3)	30.8 (87.4)	30.1 (86.2)	30.0 (86.0)	26.4 (79.5)	24.2 (75.6)	22.7 (72.9)	26.6 (79.9)
Average precipitation mm (inches)	4 (0.2)	6 (0.2)	16 (0.6)	4 (0.2)	7 (0.3)	0 (0)	5 (0.2)	6 (0.2)	3 (0.1)	5 (0.2)	14 (0.6)	10 (0.4)	80 (3.2)
Source 1: Climate-Data.org, altitude: 13m
Source 2: Levoyageur

The submarine coastal spring waters have an interesting geothermal potential (with a deep temperature of approximatively 200 °C).

== Notable residents ==
- Hasna Mohamed Dato, Politician
- Abdallah Mohamed Kamil, Politician
- Henry de Monfreid, Adventurer, writer
