= Outline of Djibouti =

Country in the Horn of Africa

The Flag of Djibouti

The Coat of arms of Djibouti

The location of Djibouti

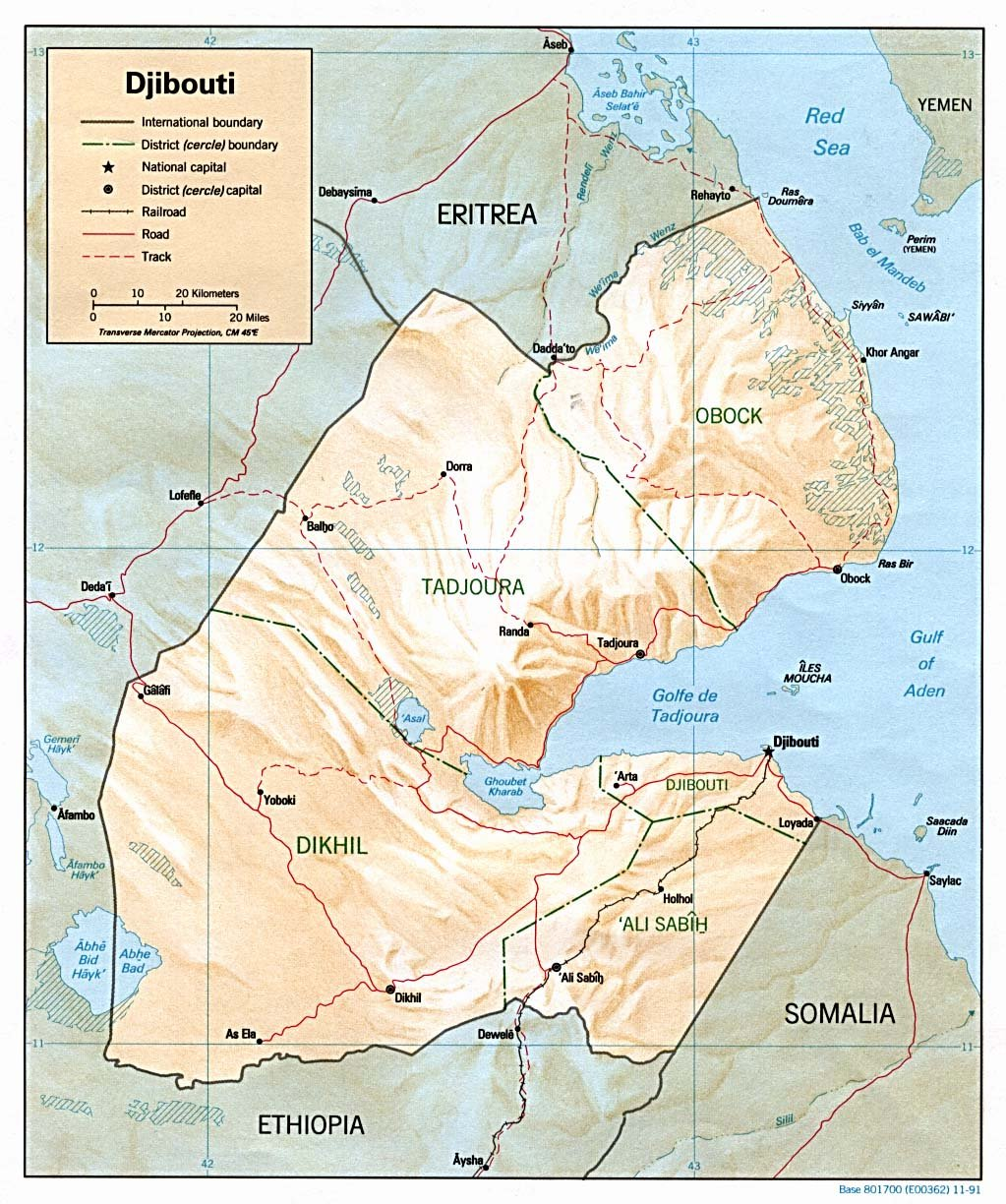
An enlargeable relief map of the Republic of Djibouti

The following outline is provided as an overview of and topical guide to Djibouti:

Djibouti – country located in the Horn of Africa. It is bordered by Eritrea in the north, Ethiopia in the west and south, and Somalia in the southeast. The remainder of the border is formed by the Red Sea and the Gulf of Aden at the east. Djibouti occupies a total area of just 23,200 km^{2} (8,958 sq mi). In antiquity, the territory was part of the Land of Punt. Djibouti is a multi-ethnic nation, with a population of over 790,000 inhabitants. The Somali and Afar make up the two largest ethnic groups. Both speak Afro-Asiatic languages, which serve as recognized national languages. Arabic and French constitute the country's two official languages. About 94% of residents adhere to Islam, a religion that has been predominant in the region for more than 1,000 years. Djibouti is strategically located near the world's busiest shipping lanes, controlling access to the Red Sea and Indian Ocean.

== General reference ==
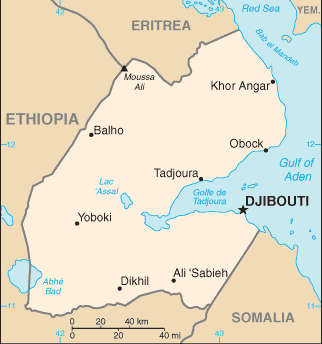
An enlargeable basic map of Djibouti

- Pronunciation: /dʒɪˈbuːti/
- Common English country name: Djibouti
- Official English country name: The Republic of Djibouti
- Common endonym(s):
- Official endonym(s):
- Adjectival(s): Djiboutian
- Demonym(s): Djiboutian(s)
- ISO country codes: DJ, DJI, 262
- ISO region codes: See ISO 3166-2:DJ
- Internet country code top-level domain: .dj

== Geography of Djibouti ==
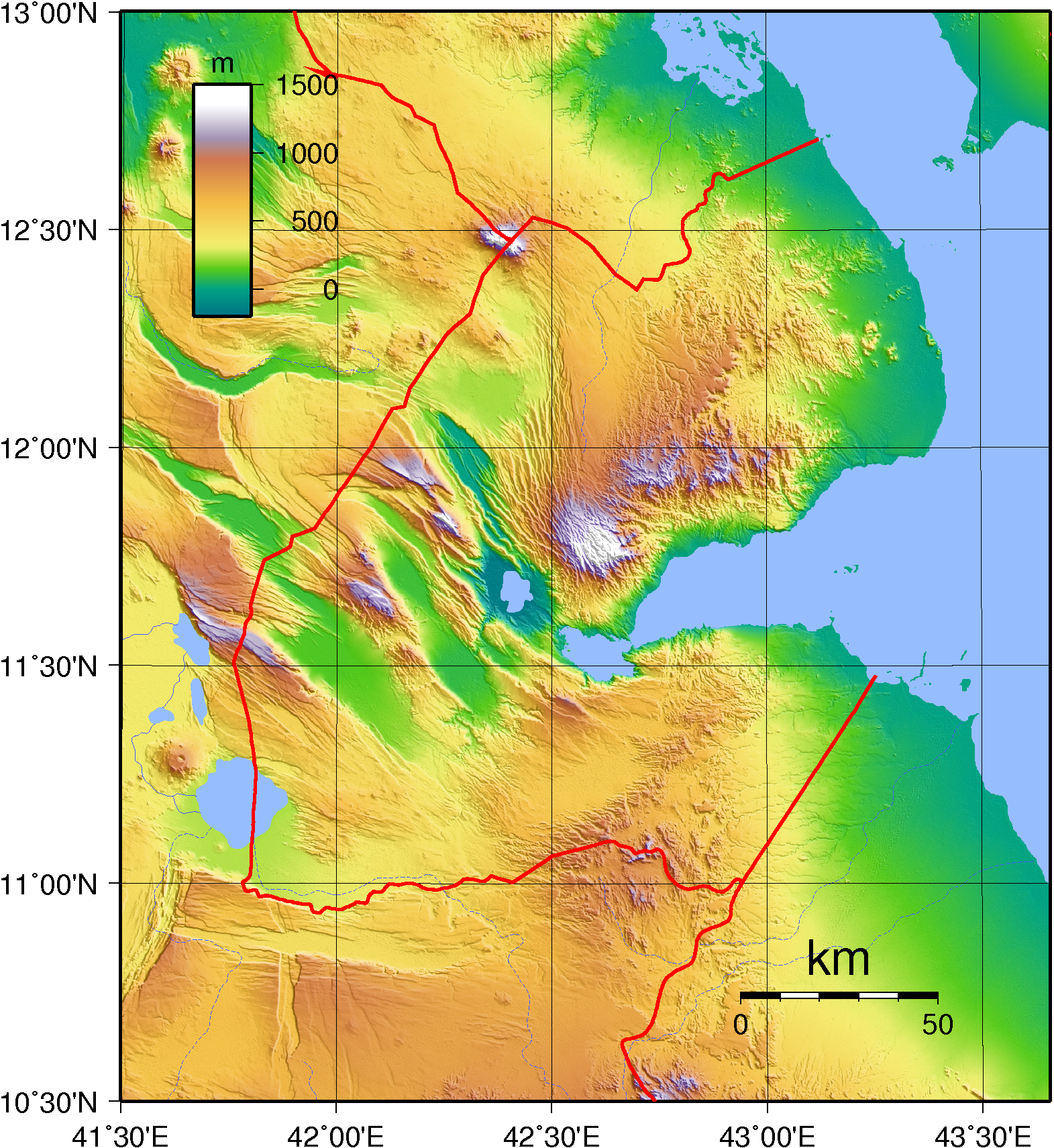
An enlargeable topographic map of Djibouti

- Djibouti is: a country
- Location:
  - Eastern Hemisphere and Southern Hemisphere
  - Africa
    - North Africa
    - East Africa
      - Horn of Africa
  - Time zone: East Africa Time (UTC+03)
  - Extreme points of Djibouti
    - High: Mousa Ali 2,028 m (6,654 ft)
    - Low: Lake Asal −155 m (−509 ft) – lowest point outside of Asia
  - Land boundaries: 516 km

Ethiopia 349 km
Eritrea 109 km
Somalia 58 km

- Coastline: 314 km

- Population of Djibouti: 833,000 - 156th most populous country
- Area of Djibouti: 23,200 km^{2}
- Atlas of Djibouti

=== Environment of Djibouti ===
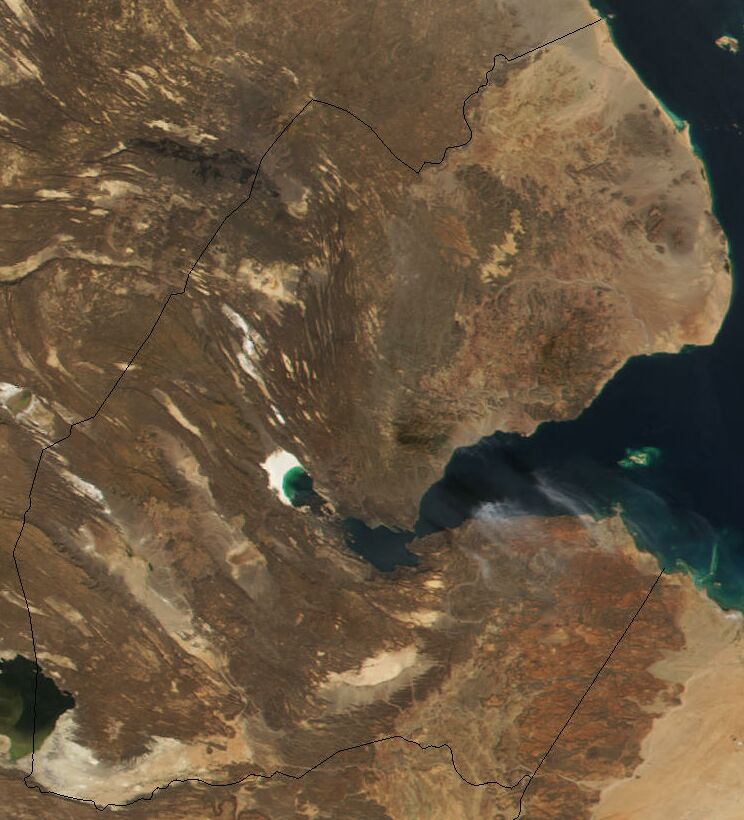
An enlargeable satellite image of Djibouti

- Climate of Djibouti
- Geology of Djibouti
- Wildlife of Djibouti
  - Fauna of Djibouti
    - Birds of Djibouti
    - Mammals of Djibouti

==== Natural geographic features of Djibouti ====
- Glaciers in Djibouti: none
- Islands of Djibouti
- Mountains of Djibouti
  - Volcanoes in Djibouti
- Rivers of Djibouti
- World Heritage Sites in Djibouti: None

==== Administrative divisions of Djibouti ====
- Regions of Djibouti
  - Sub-prefectures of Djibouti

===== Regions of Djibouti =====
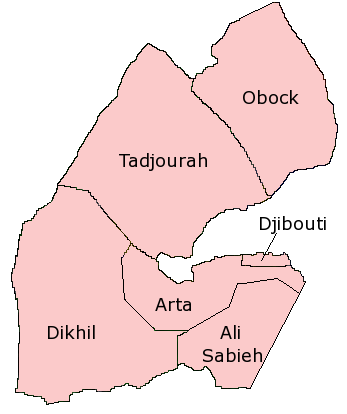

Region	Capital
Ali Sabieh	Ali Sabieh
Arta	Arta
Dikhil	Dikhil
Djibouti	Djibouti
Obock	Obock
Tadjourah	Tadjourah

===== Sub-prefectures of Djibouti =====
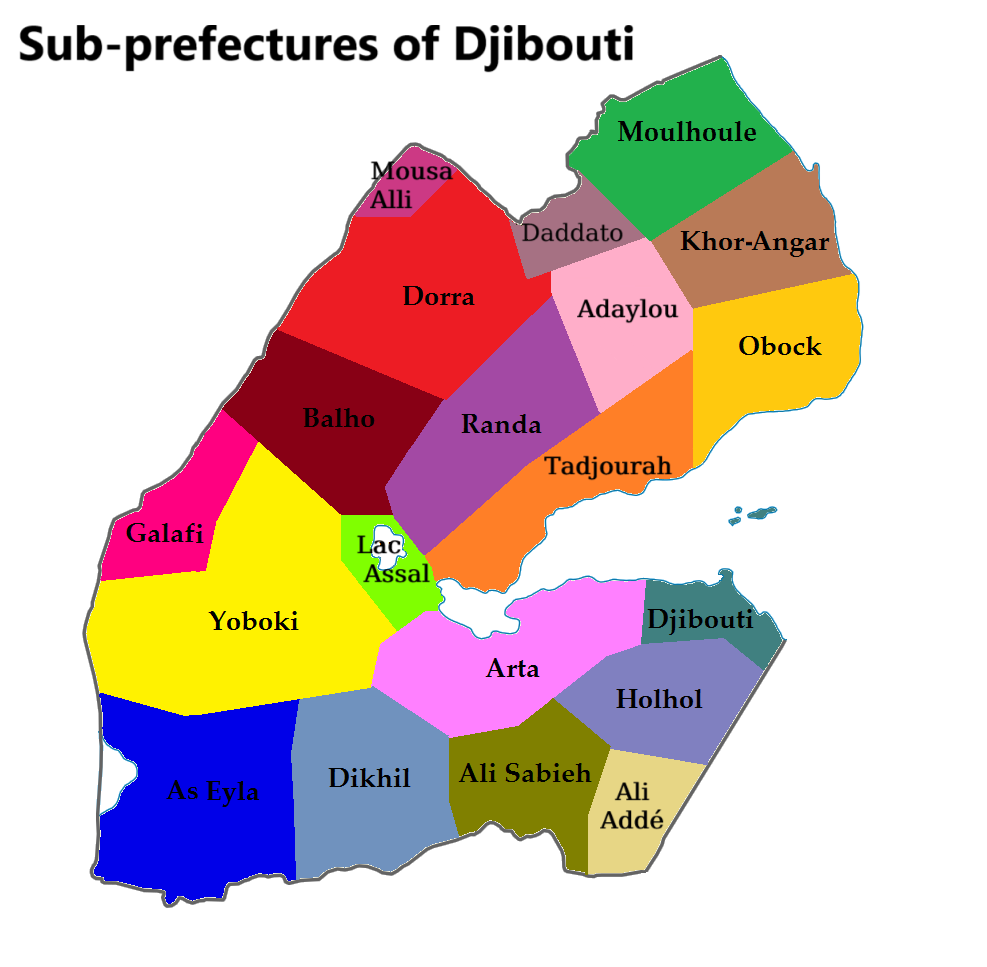
Districts of Djibouti

- Capital of Djibouti: Djibouti City
- Cities of Djibouti

=== Demography of Djibouti ===
Demographics of Djibouti

== Government and politics of Djibouti ==
- Politics of Djibouti
  - Form of government: unitary presidential representative democratic republic
  - Capital of Djibouti: Djibouti City
  - Elections in Djibouti
  - Political parties in Djibouti

=== Branches of the government of Djibouti ===
- Politics of Djibouti

==== Executive branch of the government of Djibouti ====
- Head of state and head of government: President of Djibouti, Ismaïl Omar Guelleh
- Cabinet of Djibouti
  - Prime Minister of Djibouti, Abdoulkader Kamil Mohamed
  - Ministries of Djibouti

==== Legislative branch of the government of Djibouti ====
- National Assembly of Djibouti (unicameral)

==== Judicial branch of the government of Djibouti ====
- Court system of Djibouti

=== Foreign relations of Djibouti ===
Foreign relations of Djibouti

- Diplomatic missions in Djibouti
- Diplomatic missions of Djibouti

==== International organization membership ====
The Republic of Djibouti is a member of:

- African, Caribbean, and Pacific Group of States (ACP)
- African Development Bank Group (AfDB)
- African Union (AU)
- Arab Fund for Economic and Social Development (AFESD)
- Arab Monetary Fund (AMF)
- Common Market for Eastern and Southern Africa (COMESA)
- Food and Agriculture Organization (FAO)
- Group of 77 (G77)
- Inter-Governmental Authority on Development (IGAD)
- International Bank for Reconstruction and Development (IBRD)
- International Civil Aviation Organization (ICAO)
- International Criminal Court (ICCt)
- International Criminal Police Organization (Interpol)
- International Development Association (IDA)
- International Federation of Red Cross and Red Crescent Societies (IFRCS)
- International Finance Corporation (IFC)
- International Fund for Agricultural Development (IFAD)
- International Labour Organization (ILO)
- International Maritime Organization (IMO)
- International Monetary Fund (IMF)
- International Olympic Committee (IOC)
- International Red Cross and Red Crescent Movement (ICRM)
- International Telecommunication Union (ITU)
- International Trade Union Confederation (ITUC)
- Islamic Development Bank (IDB)
- League of Arab States (LAS)
- Multilateral Investment Guarantee Agency (MIGA)
- Nonaligned Movement (NAM)
- Organisation internationale de la Francophonie (OIF)
- Organisation of Islamic Cooperation (OIC)
- Organisation for the Prohibition of Chemical Weapons (OPCW)
- United Nations (UN)
- United Nations Conference on Trade and Development (UNCTAD)
- United Nations Educational, Scientific, and Cultural Organization (UNESCO)
- United Nations Industrial Development Organization (UNIDO)
- United Nations Mission for the Referendum in Western Sahara (MINURSO)
- Universal Postal Union (UPU)
- World Customs Organization (WCO)
- World Federation of Trade Unions (WFTU)
- World Health Organization (WHO)
- World Intellectual Property Organization (WIPO)
- World Meteorological Organization (WMO)
- World Tourism Organization (UNWTO)
- World Trade Organization (WTO)

=== Law and order in Djibouti ===
- Law of Djibouti
  - Constitution of Djibouti
  - Human rights in Djibouti
    - LGBT rights in Djibouti
  - Law enforcement in Djibouti

=== Djibouti Armed Forces ===
- Djibouti Armed Forces
  - Command
    - Commander-in-chief:
      - Ministry of Defence of Djibouti
  - Forces
  - Djibouti National Army
    - Djibouti Air Force
    - Djiboutian Navy
  - Military history of Djibouti

=== Local government in Djibouti ===
- Local government in Djibouti

== History of Djibouti ==
- Current events of Djibouti
- Military history of Djibouti

== Culture of Djibouti ==
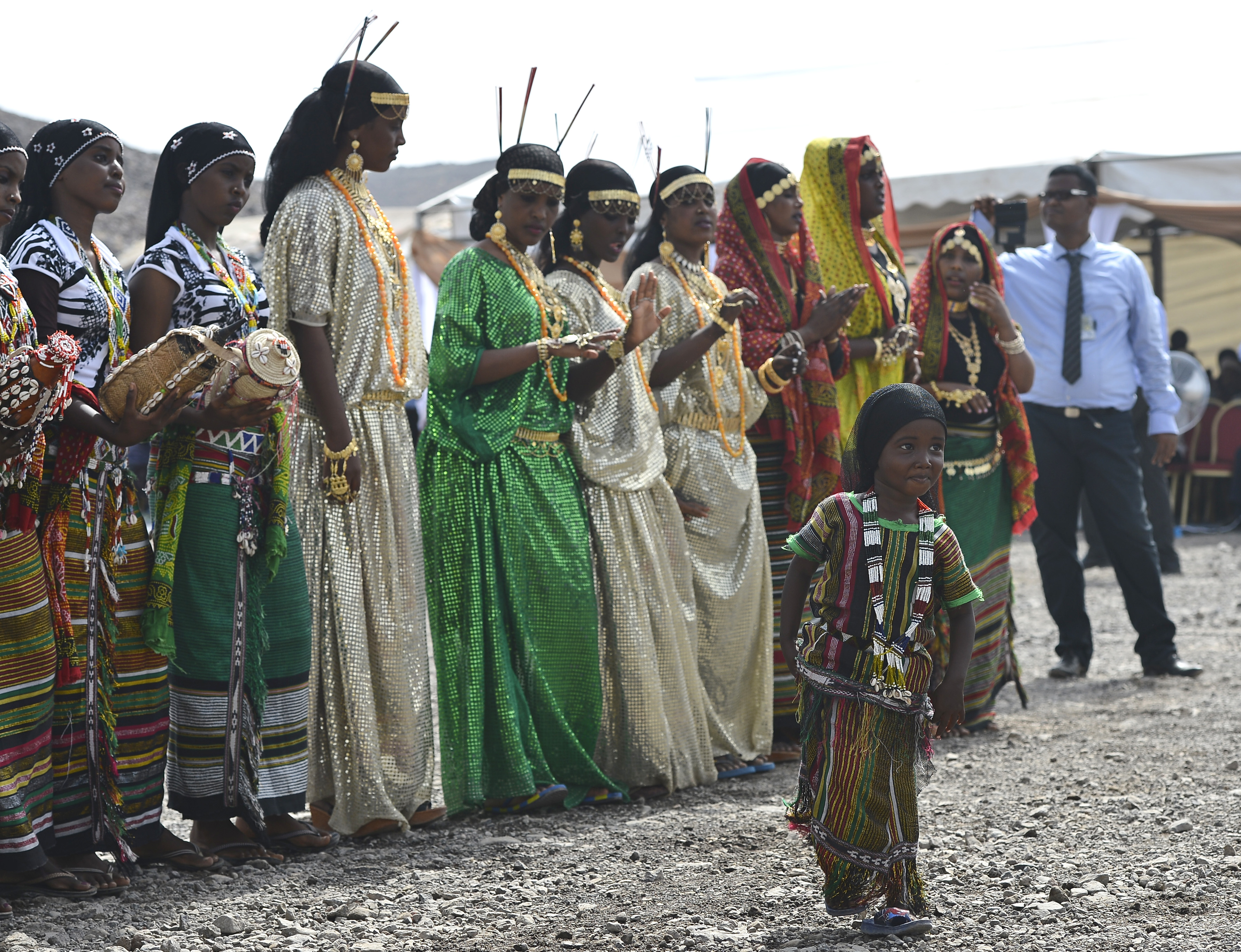
Traditional Afar and Issa ceremonial attire and dance

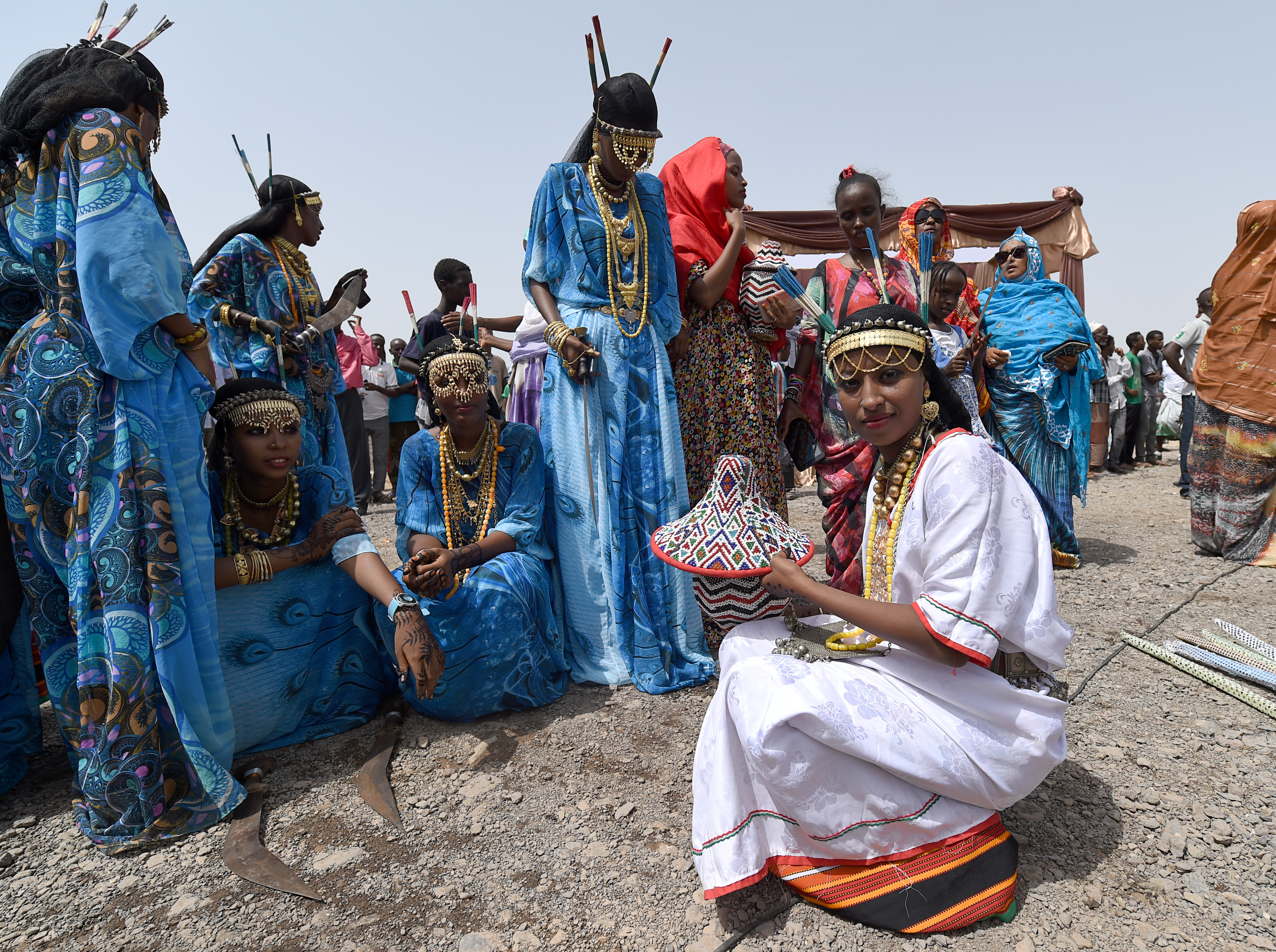
Performers in Tadjourah during the Sultan of Gobaad induction

Traditional nomadic toukoul dwellings at Lake Abbe

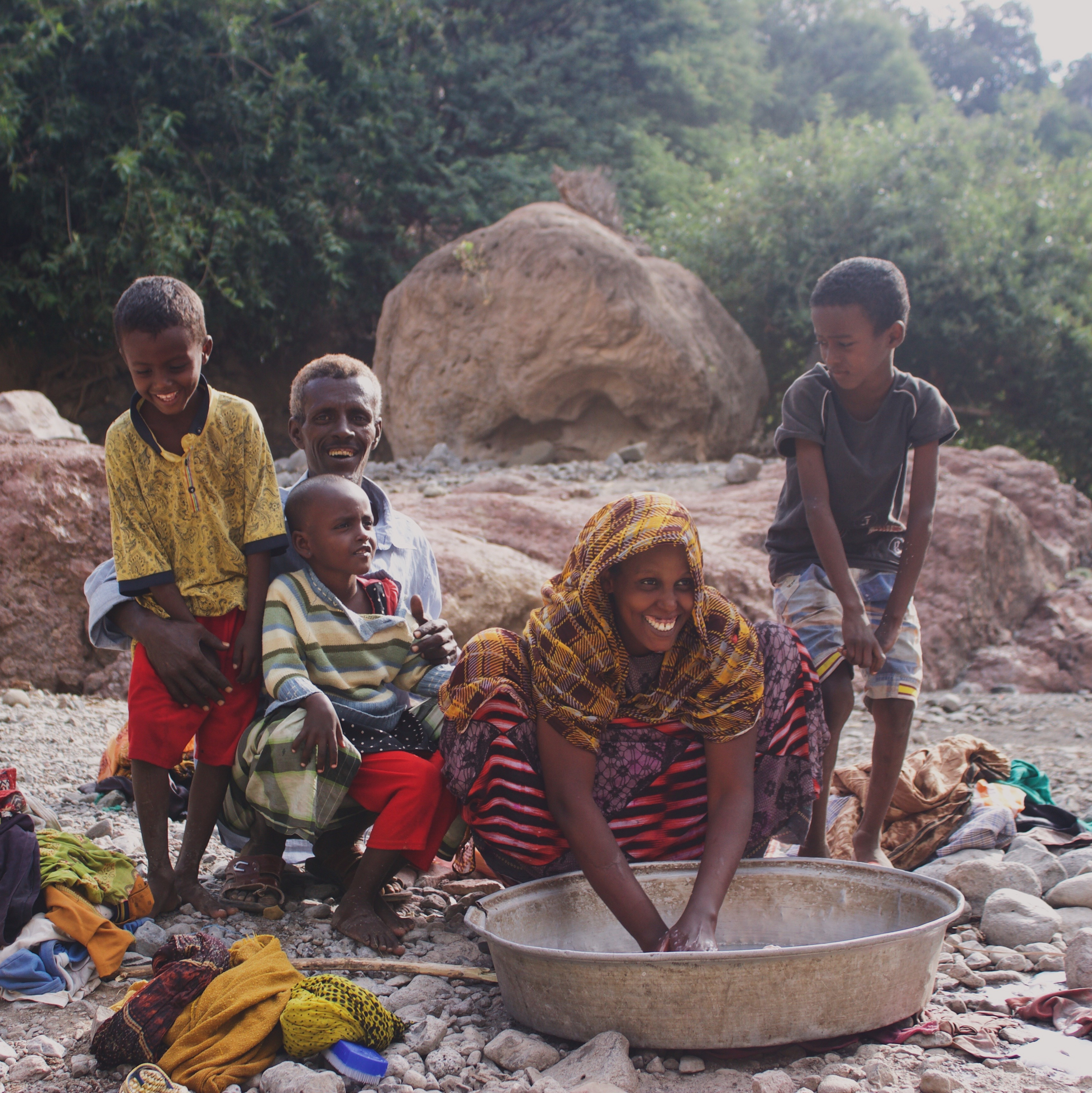
Family heritage and traditional dress in Djibouti

Representative elements of traditional attire, dance, nomadic architecture, and community life in Djibouti.
- Cuisine of Djibouti
- Languages of Djibouti
- National symbols of Djibouti
  - Coat of arms of Djibouti
  - Flag of Djibouti
  - National anthem of Djibouti
- People of Djibouti
- Public holidays in Djibouti
- Religion in Djibouti
  - Christianity in Djibouti
  - Islam in Djibouti
  - Sikhism in Djibouti
- World Heritage Sites in Djibouti: None
  - Proposed: Lake Assal zone, including Ardoukoba volcano

=== Art in Djibouti ===
Art in Djibouti

- Cinema of Djibouti
- Literature of Djibouti
- Music of Djibouti

=== Sports in Djibouti ===
- Football in Djibouti
- Djibouti at the Olympics

== Economy and infrastructure of Djibouti ==
- Economic rank, by nominal GDP (2007): 170th (one hundred and seventieth)
- Agriculture in Djibouti
- Communications in Djibouti
  - Telecommunications in Djibouti (includes Internet)
- Companies of Djibouti
- Currency of Djibouti: Franc
  - ISO 4217: DJF
- Energy in Djibouti
- Health care in Djibouti
- Mining in Djibouti
- Tourism in Djibouti
- Transport in Djibouti
  - Airports in Djibouti
  - Rail transport in Djibouti

== See also ==
- List of international rankings
- Member state of the United Nations
- Outline of Africa
