= La Poste de Djibouti =

Postal service in Djibouti

- Industry: Postal services, courier
- Founded: 2000
- Headquarters: Boulevard de la République, Djibouti City, Djibouti
- Services: Letter post, parcel service, EMS, delivery, Financial services
- Website: laposte.dj

La Poste de Djibouti, is the public operator responsible for postal service in Djibouti.

== See also ==
- Communications in Djibouti
- Djibouti Telecom
