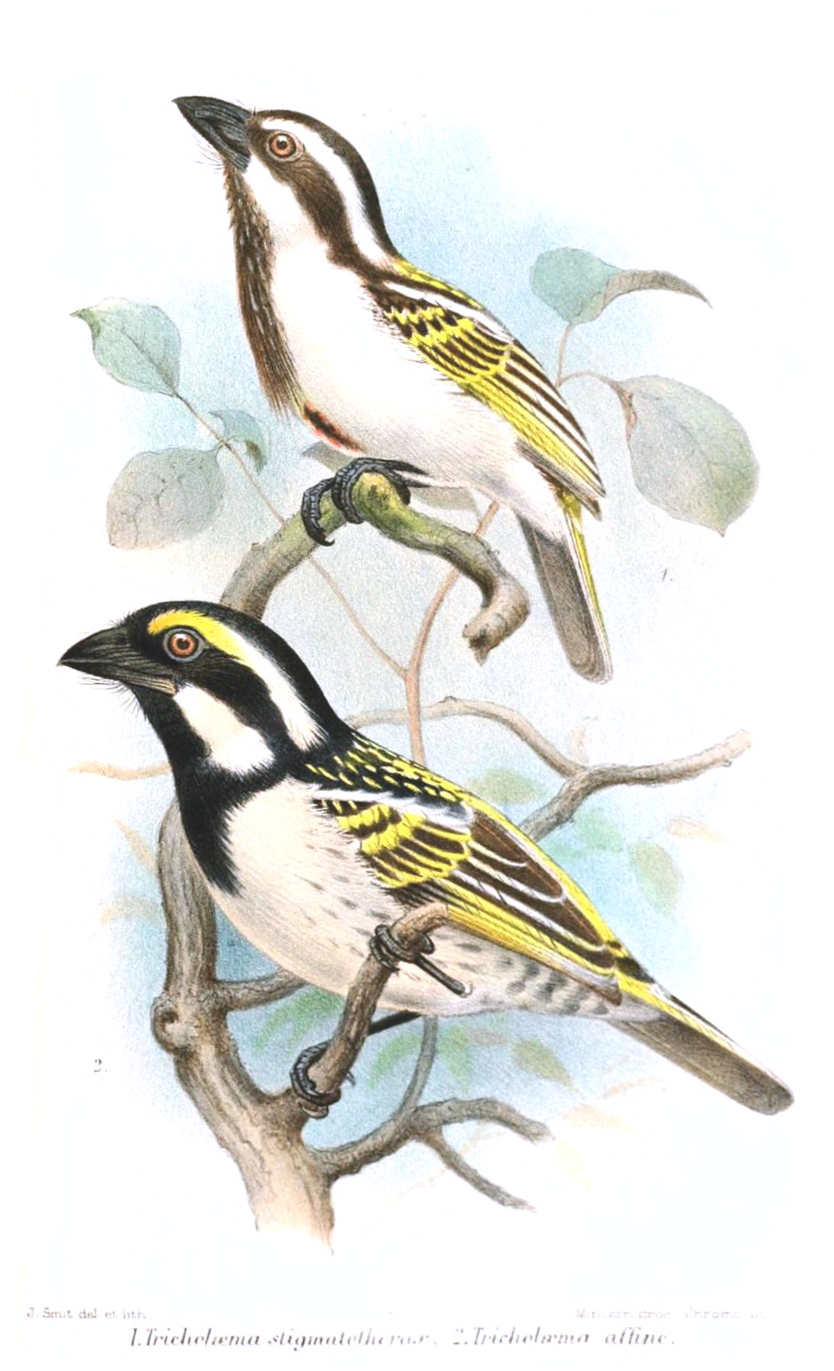
- Black-throated barbet (above) and pied barbet (below); illustration by Joseph Smit, 1891

Scientific classification
- Kingdom: Animalia
- Phylum: Chordata
- Class: Aves
- Order: Piciformes
- Family: Lybiidae
- Genus: Tricholaema; Verreaux & Verreaux, 1855

Species
- Tricholaema diademata Tricholaema frontata Tricholaema hirsuta Tricholaema lacrymosa Tricholaema leucomelas Tricholaema melanocephala

= Tricholaema =

Genus of birds

Tricholaema is a bird genus in the African barbet family Lybiidae. It was formerly included with the New World barbets in the family Capitonidae and sometimes also in the Ramphastidae.

The genus Tricholaema was introduced by the French brothers Jules and Édouard Verreaux in 1855 with the hairy-breasted barbet (Tricholaema hirsuta) as the type species. The generic name combines the Ancient Greek thrix meaning hair and laimos meaning "throat".

The genus contains the following six species:

Image	Scientific name	Common name	Distribution
	Tricholaema hirsuta	Hairy-breasted barbet	Angola, Cameroon, Central African Republic, Republic of the Congo, Democratic Republic of the Congo, Ivory Coast, Equatorial Guinea, Gabon, Ghana, Guinea, Kenya, Liberia, Mali, Nigeria, Senegal, Sierra Leone, South Sudan, Tanzania, Togo and Uganda
	Tricholaema diademata	Red-fronted barbet	Ethiopia, Kenya, South Sudan, Tanzania, and Uganda.
	Tricholaema frontata	Miombo pied barbet	central Angola, the south of the Democratic Republic of the Congo, western Malawi, southwest Tanzania, and Zambia
	Tricholaema leucomelas	Acacia pied barbet	Angola, Botswana, Lesotho, Mozambique, Namibia, South Africa, Swaziland, Zambia, and Zimbabwe.
	Tricholaema lacrymosa	Spot-flanked barbet	Burundi, Democratic Republic of the Congo, Kenya, Rwanda, South Sudan, Tanzania, Uganda, and Zambia.
	Tricholaema melanocephala	Black-throated barbet	Djibouti, Eritrea, Ethiopia, Kenya, Somalia, South Sudan, Tanzania, and Uganda.
