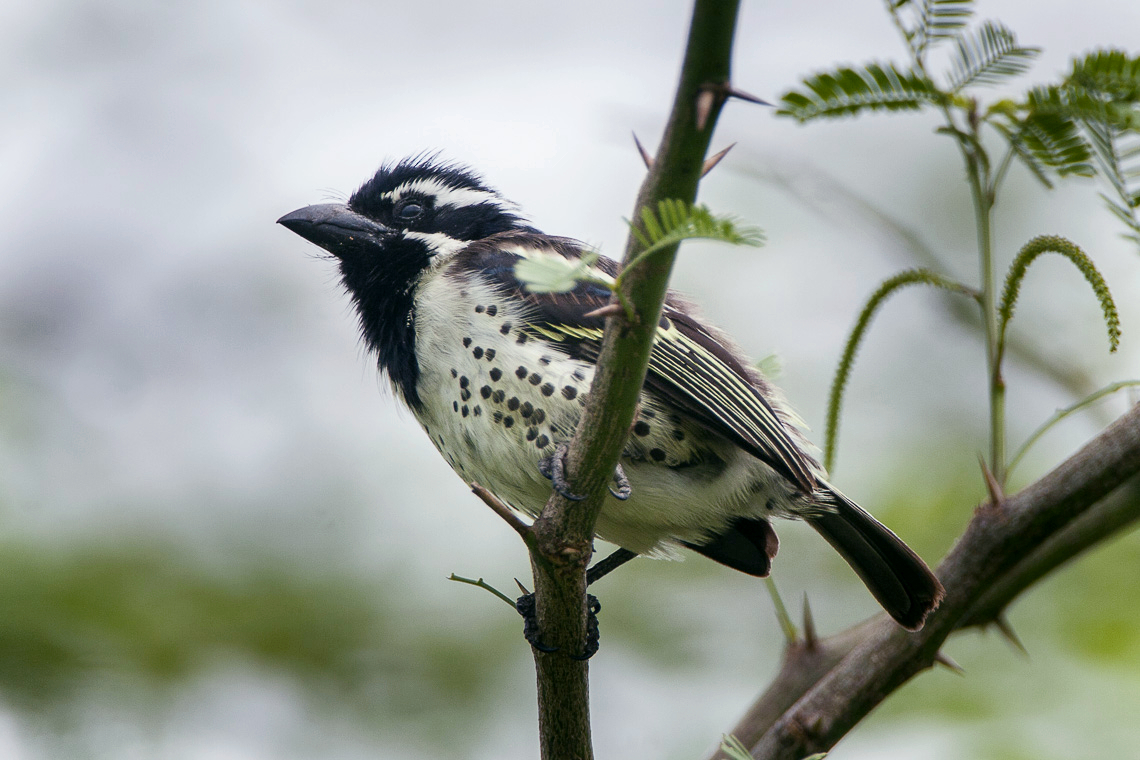

Conservation status
- Least Concern (IUCN 3.1)

Scientific classification
- Kingdom: Animalia
- Phylum: Chordata
- Class: Aves
- Order: Piciformes
- Family: Lybiidae
- Genus: Tricholaema
- Species: T. lacrymosa

Binomial name
- Tricholaema lacrymosa Cabanis, 1878

Subspecies
- T. l. lacrymosa - Cabanis, 1878; T. l. radcliffei - Ogilvie-Grant, 1904

= Spot-flanked barbet =

Species of bird

The spot-flanked barbet (Tricholaema lacrymosa) is a species of bird in the family Lybiidae. It is found in Burundi, Democratic Republic of the Congo, Kenya, Rwanda, South Sudan, Tanzania, Uganda, and Zambia.

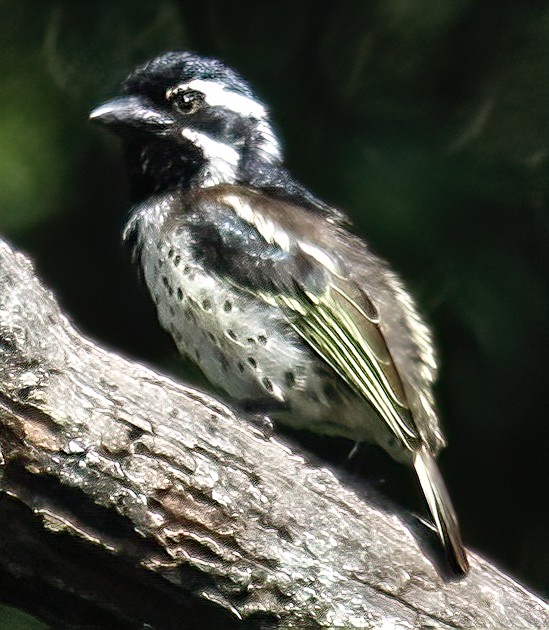
Spot-flanked Barbet - Masai Mara, Kenya
