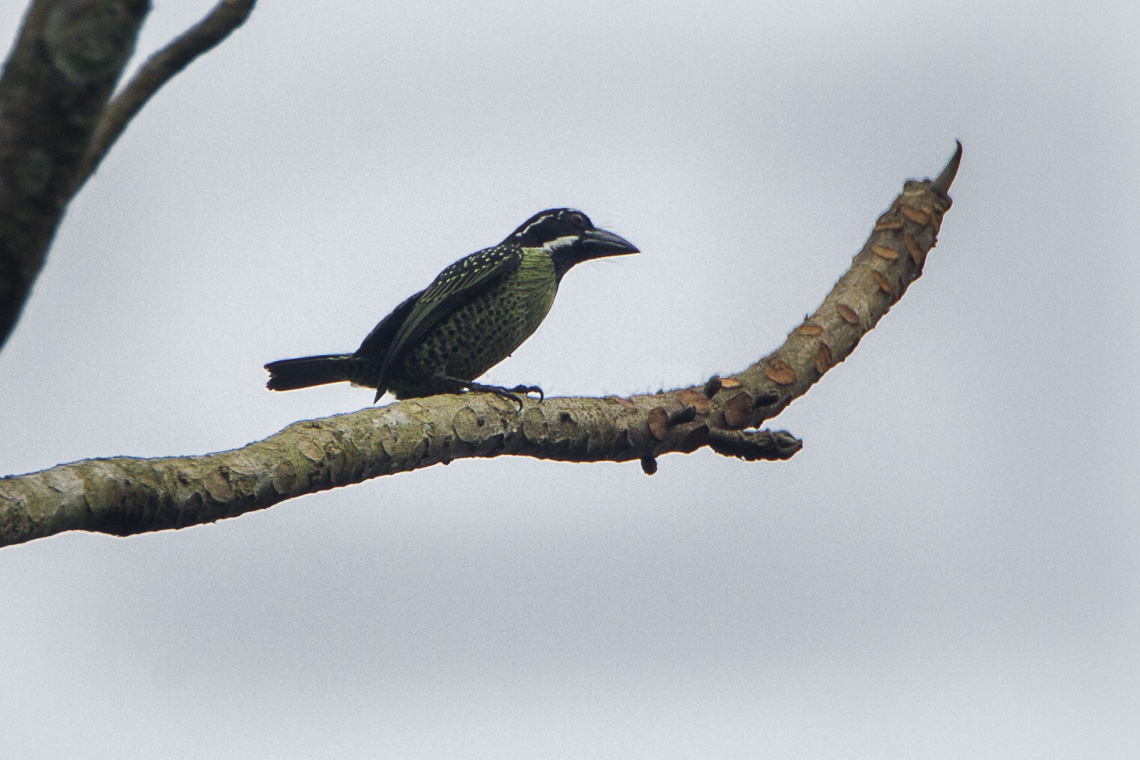

Conservation status
- Least Concern (IUCN 3.1)

Scientific classification
- Kingdom: Animalia
- Phylum: Chordata
- Class: Aves
- Order: Piciformes
- Family: Lybiidae
- Genus: Tricholaema
- Species: T. hirsuta

Binomial name
- Tricholaema hirsuta (Swainson, 1821)

Subspecies
- T. h. hirsuta - (Swainson, 1821); T. h. flavipunctata - Verreaux, J & Verreaux, E, 1855; T. h. angolensis - Neumann, 1908; T. h. ansorgii - Shelley, 1895

Synonyms
- Pogonias hirsutus

= Hairy-breasted barbet =

Species of bird

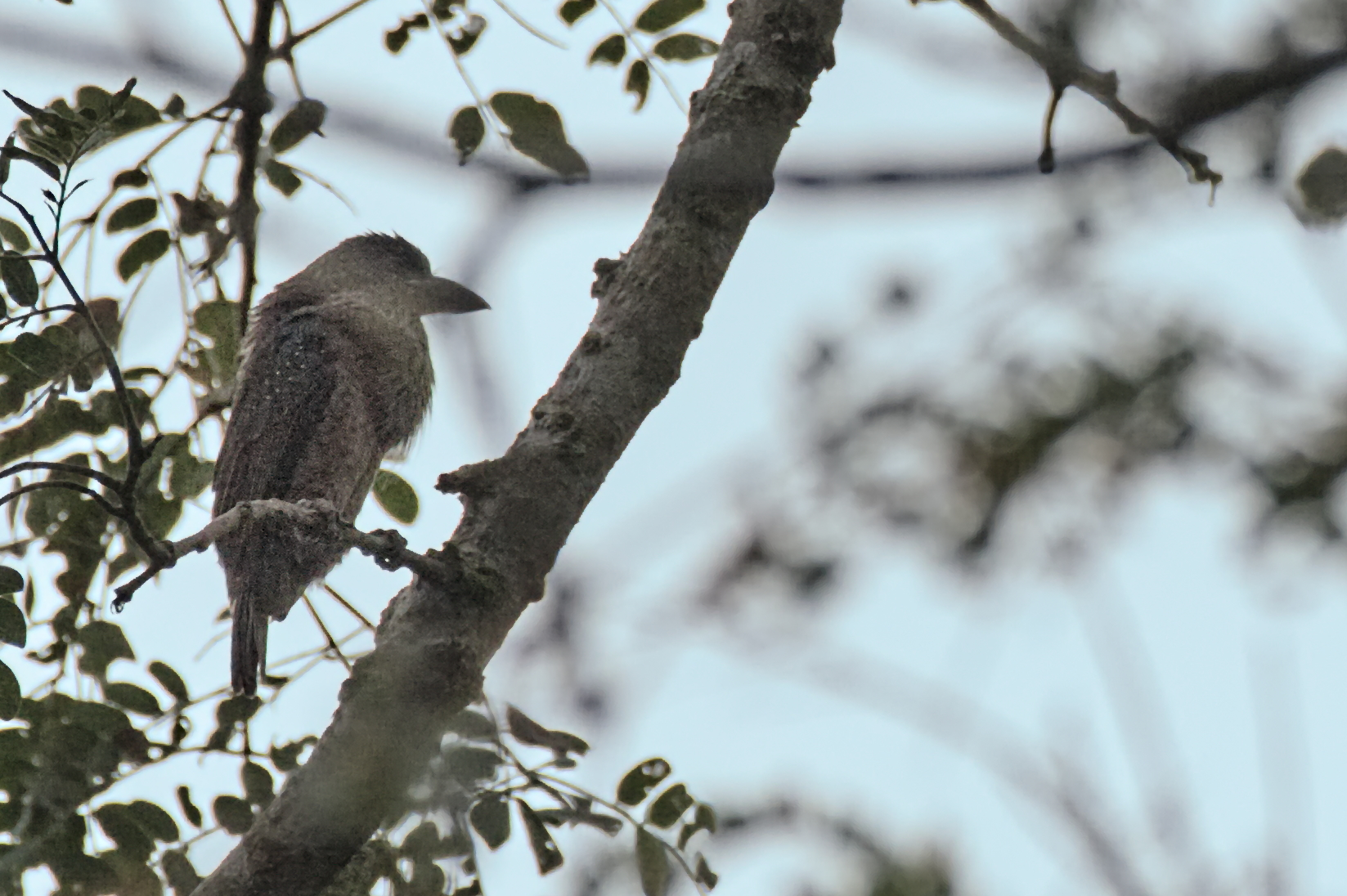
Hairy-breasted Barbet

The hairy-breasted barbet (Tricholaema hirsuta) is a species of bird in the family Lybiidae. It is found throughout the African tropical rainforest.

== Taxonomy ==
The species was described as Pogonias hirsutus by William Swainson in 1821. Four subspecies are recognized: T. h. hirsuta, from Sierra Leone to south central Nigeria; T. h. flavipunctata, from southern Nigeria to central Gabon; T. h. angolensis, from southern Gabon to northern Angola and T. h. ansorgii, from eastern Cameroon and the east of the DRC to western Kenya and northwestern Tanzania.

== Distribution and habitat ==
The hairy-breasted barbet is found in Angola, Cameroon, Central African Republic, Republic of the Congo, Democratic Republic of the Congo, Ivory Coast, Equatorial Guinea, Gabon, Ghana, Guinea, Kenya, Liberia, Mali, Nigeria, Senegal, Sierra Leone, South Sudan, Tanzania, Togo and Uganda. The size of its range is estimated at 6,840,000 km^{2} (2,640,000 sq mi). It is found at elevations of up to 1,800 m (5,900 ft). Its habitat is mainly lowland primary forests and it also enters older secondary forests.

== Description ==
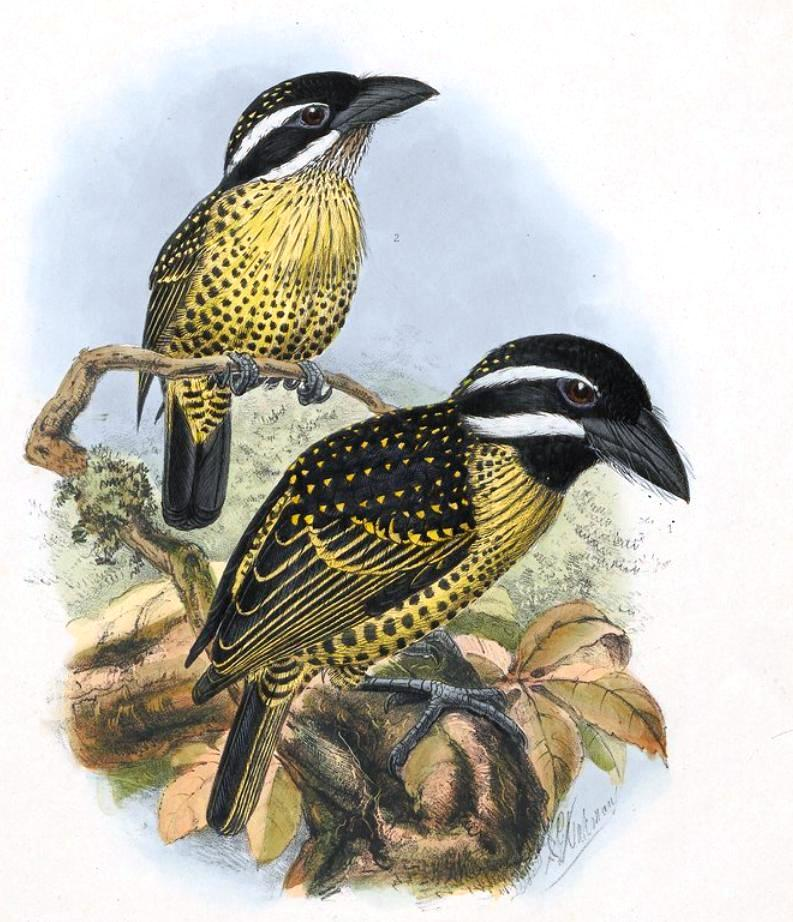
juvenile (top) and adult (below)

Its length is 17–18 cm (6.7–7.1 in), and it weighs 43–63 g (1.5–2.2 oz). The male has a blue-black head with a white superciliary line and a white malar stripe. The upperparts are black with yellow spots on the back and yellow bars on the rump. The tail is brown-black. The throat is black. The breast and flanks are yellow with black markings. The wings are brown-black, with some feathers having yellow edges. The beak is black and the legs are grey. The eyes are red or red-brown. The dorsal markings and underparts of the female are more golden yellow. The immature has laxer plumage. The spots on its upperparts are paler and sparser. The black markings on its vent are more barred.

T. h. flavipunctata does not have stripes on its head. There are white spots on its face and yellow spots on its head. Its back is browner, and its underparts are a dull brownish-yellow. T. h. angolensis is browner than flavipunctata. There are fine whitish spots on its face. Its vent is brownish, and its throat is brown-white with brown bars. T. h. ansorgii has narrow lines on its face. Its throat is white and streaked with black. Its upperparts are browner, and its underparts are less bright.

== Behavior ==
The hairy-breasted barbet usually feeds singly or in a pair. Its diet consists of fruits, including drupes and berries, along with insects, such as beetles and caterpillars. It has been observed to remove wings and legs from insects by bashing them on branches.

It sometimes joins mixed-species foraging flocks.

Each pair defends a territory, and both the male and female sing. The song is repeated oork or oop notes. While a bird sings, it spreads out some of its feathers, puffs its throat and rotates its head from side to side. In flight displays, it swoops downwards and it also glides without moving its wings. Its breeding is not well known. It has been found in cavities in trees, but it is not known if it nests in these cavities. Breeding activity, including in females with large ovaries and juvenile birds, has been observed in different parts of the year in different regions.

== Status ==
The population size is not known. The population trend is probably stable because the species does not seem to have population declines or threats. The IUCN Red List has listed the species as least concern because it has a large range and appears to have a stable population trend.
