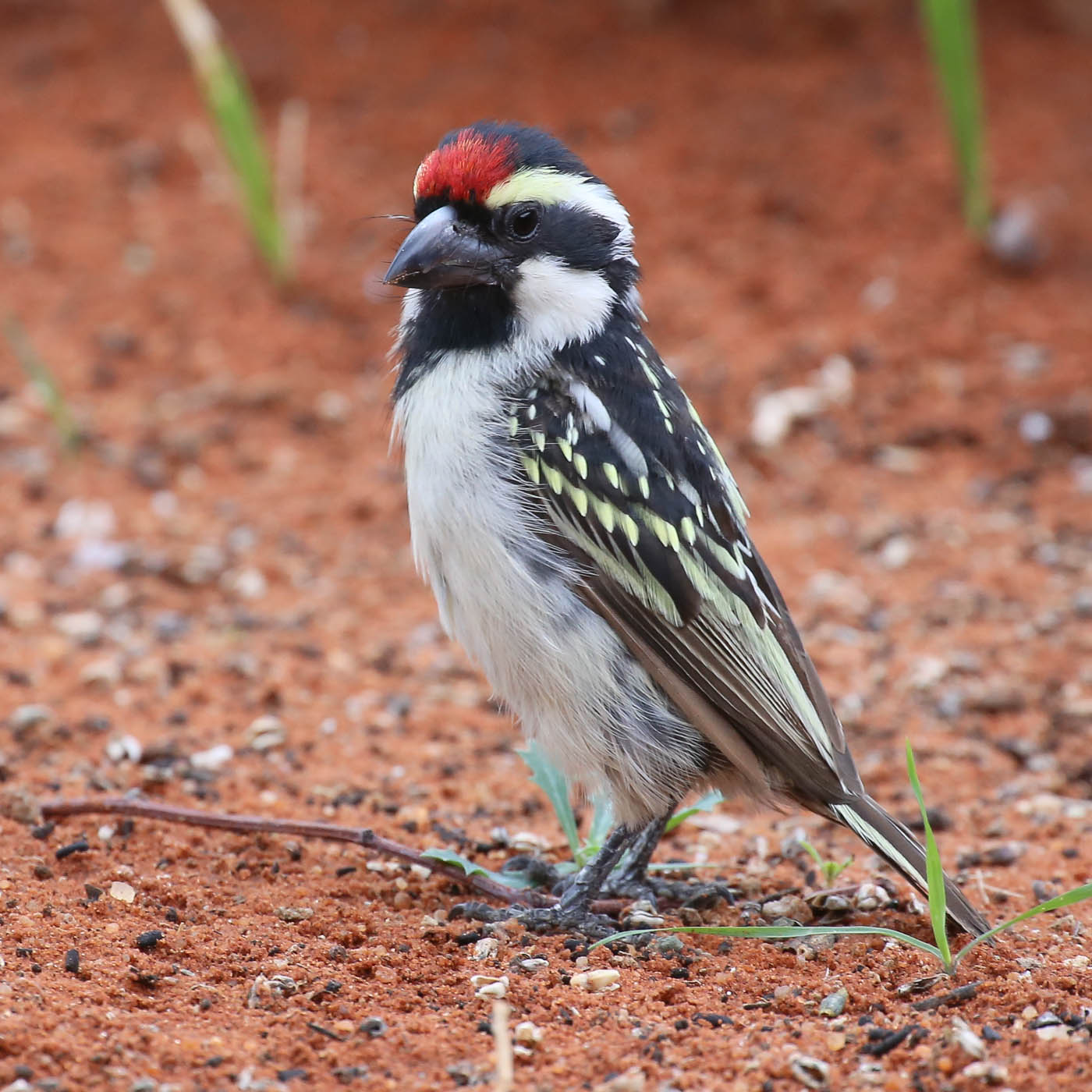
- Widespread subspecies T. l. centralis in the Hardap Region of Namibia

Conservation status
- Least Concern (IUCN 3.1)

Scientific classification
- Kingdom: Animalia
- Phylum: Chordata
- Class: Aves
- Order: Piciformes
- Family: Lybiidae
- Genus: Tricholaema
- Species: T. leucomelas

Binomial name
- Tricholaema leucomelas (Boddaert, 1783)
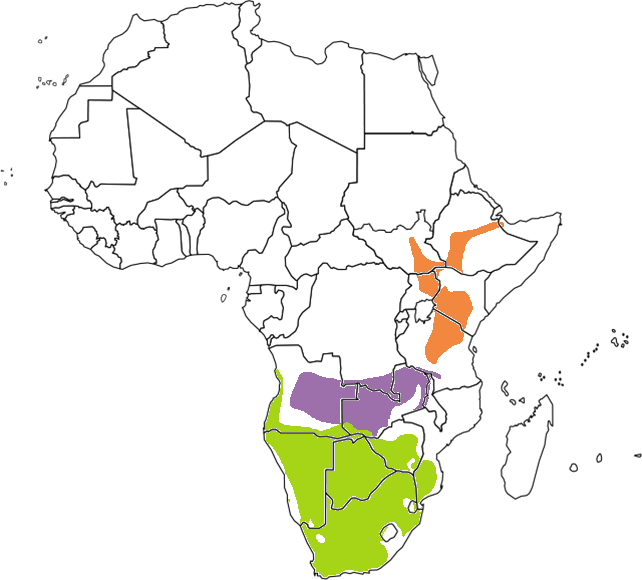
- Tricholaema diademata Tricholaema frontata Tricholaema leucomelas

Synonyms
- Tricholaema affine

= Acacia pied barbet =

Species of bird

The acacia pied barbet or pied barbet (Tricholaema leucomelas) is a species of bird in the family Lybiidae which is native to southern Africa.

== Taxonomy ==
The acacia pied barbet was described by the French polymath Georges-Louis Leclerc, Comte de Buffon in 1780 in his Histoire Naturelle des Oiseaux from a specimen collected from the Cape of Good Hope region of South Africa. The bird was also illustrated in a hand-coloured plate engraved by François-Nicolas Martinet in the Planches Enluminées D'Histoire Naturelle which was produced under the supervision of Edme-Louis Daubenton to accompany Buffon's text. Neither the plate caption nor Buffon's description included a scientific name but in 1783 the Dutch naturalist Pieter Boddaert coined the binomial name Bucco leucomelas in his catalogue of the Planches Enluminées. The acacia pied barbet is now placed in the genus Tricholaema that was introduced by the French brothers Jules and Édouard Verreaux in 1855. The generic name combines the Ancient Greek thrix meaning hair and laimos meaning "throat". The specific leucomelas combines the Ancient Greek leukos meaning "white" and melas meaning "black".

Three subspecies are recognised:

- T. l. centralis (Roberts, 1932) – Angola to west Zimbabwe south to south Namibia and north South Africa
- T. l. affinis (Shelley, 1880) – east Zimbabwe, southwest Mozambique and northeast South Africa
- T. l. leucomelas (Boddaert, 1783) – south South Africa

== Description ==
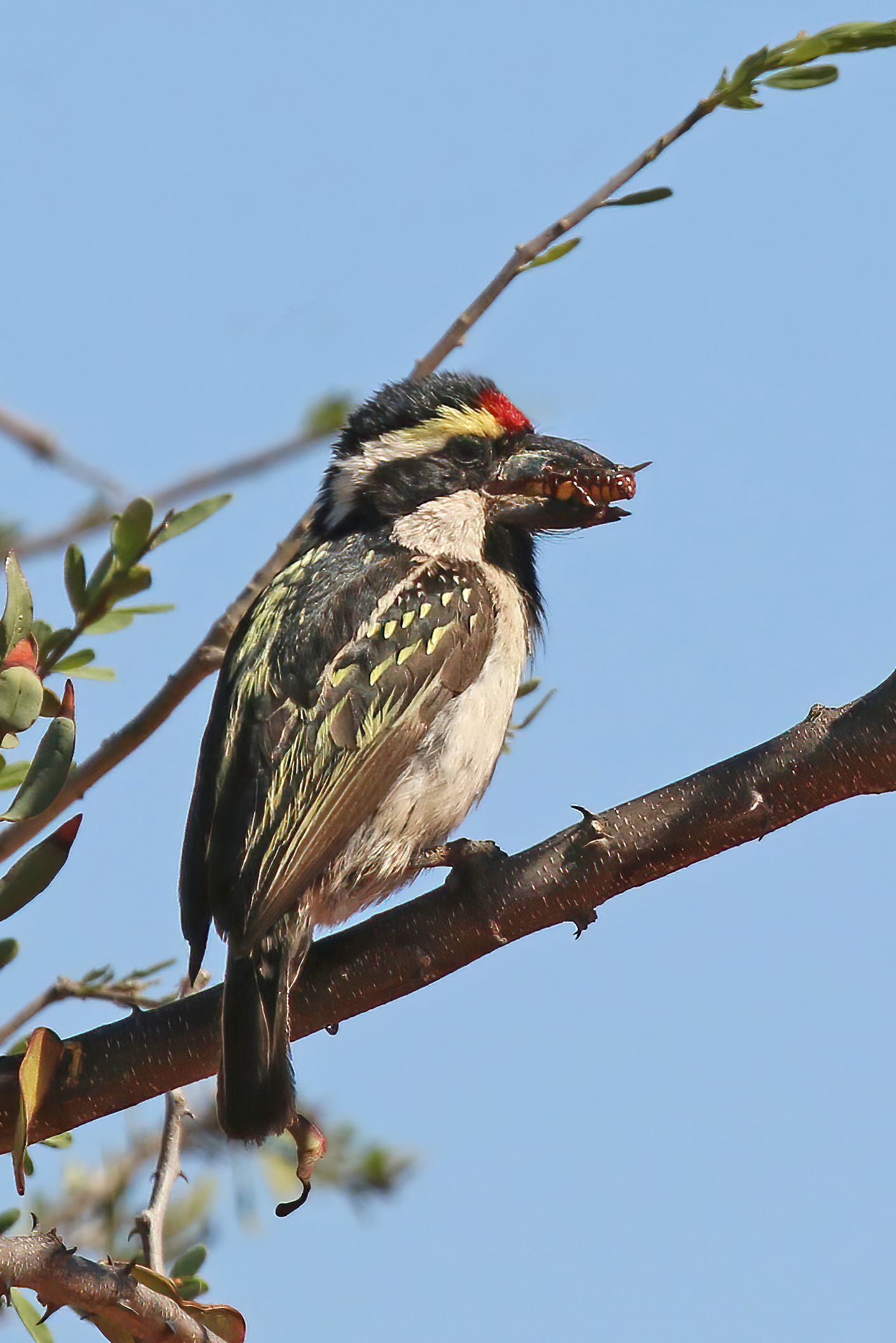
T. l. centralis with beetle prey in Tswalu Kalahari Reserve, South Africa

The acacia pied barbet has dark brown eyes and blackish legs and feet. It has a black-and-white striped head with a red front and forecrown and pale yellow superciliary stripe. It has a black bib under the chin, with a white breast and underparts in the drier land subspecies T. l. centralis. The breast and underparts are more dusky and streaky in the southerly nominate subspecies, and more yellowish in the easterly T. l. affinis. The sexes are similar in appearance. Juvenile birds lack the red mark on the forehead, and have the underpart plumage more streaky.

== Distribution and habitat ==
It primarily inhabits semi-arid savanna, as well as grassland, fynbos, agricultural areas and urban gardens, which it did not inhabit formerly. With the introduction of alien vegetation, especially Racosperma species from Australia, to regions bordering its original range, this species has been able to expand its range to these otherwise unreachable areas.

It is found in Angola, Botswana, eastern Eswatini, western Lesotho, southern Mozambique, Namibia, South Africa, southern Zambia, and Zimbabwe.

== Behaviour and ecology ==
Courtship call of the male, a monotonous series of some 21 hoots

The acacia pied barbet is a sedentary but fairly restless species that occurs in pairs or singly. Its flight is fast and direct. The acacia pied barbet drills holes into dead wood to create cavity nests, like most other barbets and woodpeckers. It lays two to four eggs from August to April, and both sexes incubate the eggs.

The acacia pied barbet has been observed taking fruit from various trees and shrubs, such as Ficus, Searsia and Phoenix reclinata, as well as Aloe nectar and insects.
