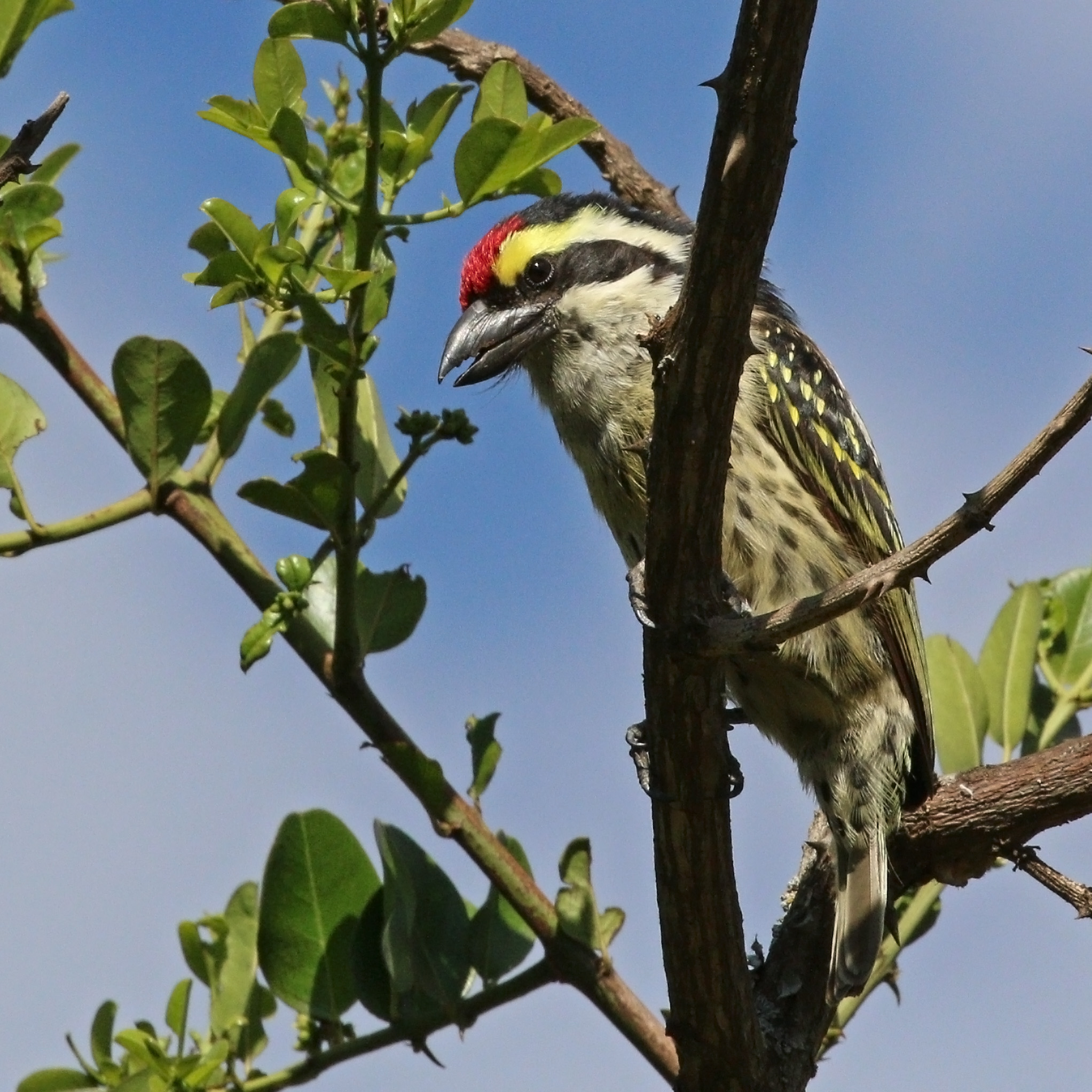
- Soysambu Conservancy, Kenya

Conservation status
- Least Concern (IUCN 3.1)

Scientific classification
- Kingdom: Animalia
- Phylum: Chordata
- Class: Aves
- Order: Piciformes
- Family: Lybiidae
- Genus: Tricholaema
- Species: T. diademata

Binomial name
- Tricholaema diademata (Heuglin, 1861)

Subspecies
- T. d. diademata (Heuglin, 1861); T. d. massaica (Reichenow, 1887)
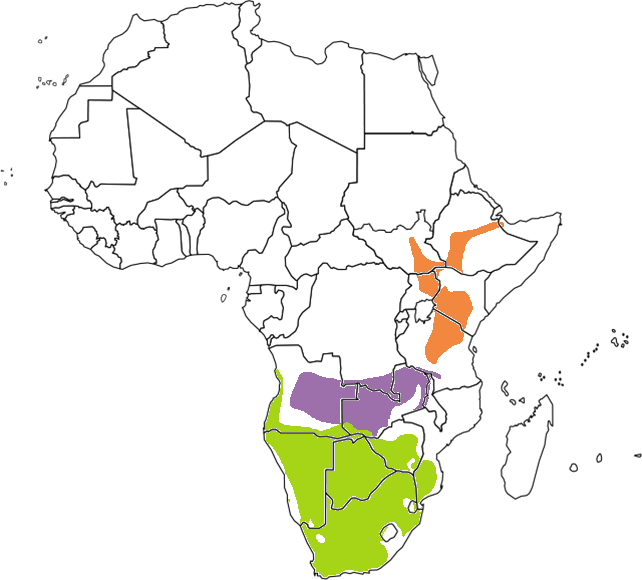
- Tricholaema diademata Tricholaema frontata Tricholaema leucomelas

= Red-fronted barbet =

Species of bird

The red-fronted barbet (Tricholaema diademata) is a species of bird in the Lybiidae family. It is found in Ethiopia, Kenya, South Sudan, Tanzania, and Uganda.
