= List of birds of Djibouti =

This is a list of the bird species recorded in Djibouti. The avifauna of Djibouti include a total of 389 species, of which one is endemic, and 3 have been introduced by humans. 19 species are globally threatened.

This list's taxonomic treatment (designation and sequence of orders, families and species) and nomenclature (common and scientific names) follow the conventions of The Clements Checklist of Birds of the World, 2022 edition. The family accounts at the beginning of each heading reflect this taxonomy, as do the species counts found in each family account. Introduced and accidental species are included in the total counts for Djibouti.

The following tags have been used to highlight several categories, but not all species fall into one of these categories. Those that do not are commonly occurring native species.

- (A) Accidental - a species that rarely or accidentally occurs in Djibouti
- (E) Endemic - a species endemic to Djibouti
- (I) Introduced - a species introduced to Djibouti as a consequence, direct or indirect, of human actions

== Ostriches ==
Order: Struthioniformes Family: Struthionidae

The ostrich is a flightless bird native to Africa. It is the largest living species of bird. It is distinctive in its appearance, with a long neck and legs and the ability to run at high speeds.

- Common ostrich, Struthio camelus
- Somali ostrich, Struthio molybdophanes

== Ducks, geese, and waterfowl ==
Order: Anseriformes Family: Anatidae

Anatidae includes the ducks and most duck-like waterfowl, such as geese and swans. These birds are adapted to an aquatic existence with webbed feet, flattened bills, and feathers that are excellent at shedding water due to an oily coating.

- Egyptian goose, Alopochen aegyptiacus
- Garganey, Spatula querquedula
- Blue-billed teal, Spatula hottentota (A)
- Northern shoveler, Spatula clypeata
- Eurasian wigeon, Mareca penelope (A)
- Mallard, Anas platyrhynchos
- Cape teal, Anas capensis (A)
- Northern pintail, Anas acuta
- Green-winged teal, Anas crecca (A)
- Southern pochard, Netta erythrophthalma (A)
- Tufted duck, Aythya fuligula

== Pheasants, grouse, and allies ==
Order: Galliformes Family: Phasianidae

The Phasianidae are a family of terrestrial birds which consists of quails, partridges, snowcocks, francolins, spurfowls, tragopans, monals, pheasants, peafowls and jungle fowls. In general, they are plump (although they vary in size) and have broad, relatively short wings.

- Common quail, Coturnix coturnix
- Djibouti francolin, Pternistis ochropectus (E)
- Yellow-necked francolin, Pternistis leucoscepus

== Flamingos ==
Order: Phoenicopteriformes Family: Phoenicopteridae

Flamingos are gregarious wading birds, usually 3 to 5 feet (0.9 to 1.5 m) tall, found in both the Western and Eastern Hemispheres. Flamingos filter-feed on shellfish and algae. Their oddly shaped beaks are specially adapted to separate mud and silt from the food they consume and, uniquely, are used upside-down.

- Greater flamingo, Phoenicopterus roseus
- Lesser flamingo, Phoenicopterus minor

== Grebes ==
Order: Podicipediformes Family: Podicipedidae

Grebes are small to medium-large freshwater diving birds. They have lobed toes and are excellent swimmers and divers. However, they have their feet placed far back on the body, making them quite ungainly on land.

- Little grebe, Tachybaptus ruficollis

== Pigeons and doves ==
Order: Columbiformes Family: Columbidae

Pigeons and doves are stout-bodied birds with short necks and short slender bills with a fleshy cere.

- Rock pigeon, Columba livia (I)
- Speckled pigeon, Columba guinea
- Rameron pigeon, Columba arquatrix
- European turtle-dove, Streptopelia turtur
- African collared-dove, Streptopelia roseogrisea
- Laughing dove, Streptopelia senegalensis
- Namaqua dove, Oena capensis
- Bruce's green-pigeon, Treron waalia

== Sandgrouse ==
Order: Pterocliformes Family: Pteroclidae

Sandgrouse have small, pigeon like heads and necks, but sturdy compact bodies. They have long pointed wings and sometimes tails and a fast direct flight. Flocks fly to watering holes at dawn and dusk. Their legs are feathered down to the toes.

- Chestnut-bellied sandgrouse, Pterocles exustus
- Spotted sandgrouse, Pterocles senegallus
- Lichtenstein's sandgrouse, Pterocles lichtensteinii

== Bustards ==
Order: Otidiformes Family: Otididae

Bustards are large terrestrial birds mainly associated with dry open country and steppes in the Old World. They are omnivorous and nest on the ground. They walk steadily on strong legs and big toes, pecking for food as they go. They have long broad wings with "fingered" wingtips and striking patterns in flight. Many have interesting mating displays.

- Arabian bustard, Ardeotis arabs
- Heuglin's bustard, Neotis heuglinii

== Cuckoos ==
Order: Cuculiformes Family: Cuculidae

The family Cuculidae includes cuckoos, roadrunners and anis. These birds are of variable size with slender bodies, long tails and strong legs.

- White-browed coucal, Centropus superciliosus
- Great spotted cuckoo, Clamator glandarius (A)
- Pied cuckoo, Clamator jacobinus (A)
- Dideric cuckoo, Chrysococcyx caprius
- African cuckoo, Cuculus gularis (A)
- Common cuckoo, Cuculus canorus

== Nightjars and allies ==
Order: Caprimulgiformes Family: Caprimulgidae

Nightjars are medium-sized nocturnal birds that usually nest on the ground. They have long wings, short legs and very short bills. Most have small feet, of little use for walking, and long pointed wings. Their soft plumage is camouflaged to resemble bark or leaves.

- Eurasian nightjar, Caprimulgus europaeus
- Nubian nightjar, Caprimulgus nubicus
- Plain nightjar, Caprimulgus inornatus (A)

== Swifts ==
Order: Caprimulgiformes Family: Apodidae

Swifts are small birds which spend the majority of their lives flying. These birds have very short legs and never settle voluntarily on the ground, perching instead only on vertical surfaces. Many swifts have long swept-back wings which resemble a crescent or boomerang.

- Alpine swift, Apus melba (A)
- Common swift, Apus apus
- Pallid swift, Apus pallidus (A)
- Little swift, Apus affinis
- African palm-swift, Cypsiurus parvus (A)

== Rails, gallinules, and coots ==
Order: Gruiformes Family: Rallidae

Rallidae is a large family of small to medium-sized birds which includes the rails, crakes, coots and gallinules. Typically they inhabit dense vegetation in damp environments near lakes, swamps or rivers. In general they are shy and secretive birds, making them difficult to observe. Most species have strong legs and long toes which are well adapted to soft uneven surfaces. They tend to have short, rounded wings and to be weak fliers.

- Spotted crake, Porzana porzana (A)
- Eurasian moorhen, Gallinula chloropus
- Black crake, Zapornia flavirostris
- Little crake, Zapornia parva (A)
- Baillon's crake, Zapornia pusilla (A)

== Cranes ==
Order: Gruiformes Family: Gruidae

Cranes are large, long-legged and long-necked birds. Unlike the similar-looking but unrelated herons, cranes fly with necks outstretched, not pulled back. Most have elaborate and noisy courting displays or "dances".

- Common crane, Grus grus (A)

== Thick-knees ==
Order: Charadriiformes Family: Burhinidae

The thick-knees are a group of largely tropical waders in the family Burhinidae. They are found worldwide within the tropical zone, with some species also breeding in temperate Europe and Australia. They are medium to large waders with strong black or yellow-black bills, large yellow eyes and cryptic plumage. Despite being classed as waders, most species have a preference for arid or semi-arid habitats.

- Eurasian thick-knee, Burhinus oedicnemus
- Indian thick-knee, Burhinus indicus
- Senegal thick-knee, Burhinus senegalensis
- Spotted thick-knee, Burhinus capensis

== Stilts and avocets ==
Order: Charadriiformes Family: Recurvirostridae

Recurvirostridae is a family of large wading birds, which includes the avocets and stilts. The avocets have long legs and long up-curved bills. The stilts have extremely long legs and long, thin, straight bills.

- Black-winged stilt, Himantopus himantopus
- Pied avocet, Recurvirostra avosetta

== Oystercatchers ==
Order: Charadriiformes Family: Haematopodidae

The oystercatchers are large and noisy plover-like birds, with strong bills used for smashing or prising open molluscs.

- Eurasian oystercatcher, Haematopus ostralegus

== Plovers and lapwings ==
Order: Charadriiformes Family: Charadriidae

The family Charadriidae includes the plovers, dotterels and lapwings. They are small to medium-sized birds with compact bodies, short, thick necks and long, usually pointed, wings. They are found in open country worldwide, mostly in habitats near water.

- Black-bellied plover, Pluvialis squatarola
- Pacific golden-plover, Pluvialis fulva
- Spur-winged lapwing, Vanellus spinosus
- Lesser sand-plover, Charadrius mongolus
- Greater sand-plover, Charadrius leschenaultii
- Caspian plover, Charadrius asiaticus (A)
- Kittlitz's plover, Charadrius pecuarius
- Kentish plover, Charadrius alexandrinus
- Common ringed plover, Charadrius hiaticula
- Little ringed plover, Charadrius dubius
- Three-banded plover, Charadrius tricollaris

== Sandpipers and allies ==
Order: Charadriiformes Family: Scolopacidae

Scolopacidae is a large diverse family of small to medium-sized shorebirds including the sandpipers, curlews, godwits, shanks, tattlers, woodcocks, snipes, dowitchers and phalaropes. The majority of these species eat small invertebrates picked out of the mud or soil. Variation in length of legs and bills enables multiple species to feed in the same habitat, particularly on the coast, without direct competition for food.

- Whimbrel, Numenius phaeopus
- Eurasian curlew, Numenius arquata
- Bar-tailed godwit, Limosa lapponica
- Black-tailed godwit, Limosa limosa (A)
- Ruddy turnstone, Arenaria interpres
- Great knot, Calidris tenuirostris (A)
- Red knot, Calidris canutus (A)
- Ruff, Calidris pugnax
- Broad-billed sandpiper, Calidris falcinellus
- Curlew sandpiper, Calidris ferruginea
- Temminck's stint, Calidris temminckii
- Long-toed stint, Calidris subminuta (A)
- Sanderling, Calidris alba
- Dunlin, Calidris alpina
- Little stint, Calidris minuta
- Common snipe, Gallinago gallinago
- Terek sandpiper, Xenus cinereus
- Red-necked phalarope, Phalaropus lobatus (A)
- Common sandpiper, Actitis hypoleucos
- Green sandpiper, Tringa ochropus
- Spotted redshank, Tringa erythropus (A)
- Common greenshank, Tringa nebularia
- Marsh sandpiper, Tringa stagnatilis
- Wood sandpiper, Tringa glareola
- Common redshank, Tringa totanus

== Crab plover ==
Order: Charadriiformes Family: Dromadidae

The crab plover is related to the waders. It resembles a plover but with very long grey legs and a strong heavy black bill similar to a tern. It has black-and-white plumage, a long neck, partially webbed feet and a bill designed for eating crabs.

- Crab-plover, Dromas ardeola

== Pratincoles and coursers ==
Order: Charadriiformes Family: Glareolidae

Glareolidae is a family of wading birds comprising the pratincoles, which have short legs, long pointed wings and long forked tails, and the coursers, which have long legs, short wings and long, pointed bills which curve downwards.

- Cream-colored courser, Cursorius cursor
- Somali courser, Cursorius somalensis
- Double-banded courser, Smutsornis africanus (A)
- Collared pratincole, Glareola pratincola (A)

== Skuas and jaegers ==
Order: Charadriiformes Family: Stercorariidae

The family Stercorariidae are, in general, medium to large birds, typically with grey or brown plumage, often with white markings on the wings. They nest on the ground in temperate and arctic regions and are long-distance migrants.

- Pomarine jaeger, Stercorarius pomarinus

== Gulls, terns, and skimmers ==
Order: Charadriiformes Family: Laridae

Laridae is a family of medium to large seabirds, the gulls, terns and skimmers. Gulls are typically grey or white, often with black markings on the head or wings. They have stout, longish bills and webbed feet. Terns are a group of generally medium to large seabirds typically with grey or white plumage, often with black markings on the head. Most terns hunt fish by diving but some pick insects off the surface of fresh water. Terns are generally long-lived birds, with several species known to live in excess of 30 years.

- Slender-billed gull, Chroicocephalus genei (A)
- Black-headed gull, Chroicocephalus ridibundus
- White-eyed gull, Ichthyaetus leucophthalmus
- Sooty gull, Ichthyaetus hemprichii
- Herring gull, Larus argentatus
- Caspian gull, Larus cachinnans (A)
- Armenian gull, Larus armenicus
- Lesser black-backed gull, Larus fuscus
- Brown noddy, Anous stolidus
- Sooty tern, Onychoprion fuscatus
- Bridled tern, Onychoprion anaethetus
- Little tern, Sternula albifrons
- Saunders's tern, Sternula saundersi
- Gull-billed tern, Gelochelidon nilotica
- Caspian tern, Hydroprogne caspia
- Black tern, Chlidonias niger
- White-winged tern, Chlidonias leucopterus
- Whiskered tern, Chlidonias hybrida (A)
- Common tern, Sterna hirundo
- White-cheeked tern, Sterna repressa
- Great crested tern, Thalasseus bergii
- Sandwich tern, Thalasseus sandvicensis
- Lesser crested tern, Thalasseus bengalensis

== Tropicbirds ==
Order: Phaethontiformes Family: Phaethontidae

Tropicbirds are slender white birds of tropical oceans, with exceptionally long central tail feathers. Their heads and long wings have black markings.

- Red-billed tropicbird, Phaethon aethereus

== Southern storm-petrels ==
Order: Procellariiformes Family: Oceanitidae

The southern storm-petrels are relatives of the petrels and are the smallest seabirds. They feed on planktonic crustaceans and small fish picked from the surface, typically while hovering. The flight is fluttering and sometimes bat-like.

- Wilson's storm-petrel, Oceanites oceanicus

== Northern storm-petrels ==
Order: Procellariiformes Family: Hydrobatidae

The northern storm-petrels are relatives of the petrels and are the smallest seabirds. They feed on planktonic crustaceans and small fish picked from the surface, typically while hovering. The flight is fluttering and sometimes bat-like.

- Swinhoe's storm-petrel, Hydrobates monorhis (A)

== Shearwaters and petrels ==
Order: Procellariiformes Family: Procellariidae

The procellariids are the main group of medium-sized "true petrels", characterised by united nostrils with medium septum and a long outer functional primary.

- Southern giant-petrel, Macronectes giganteus (A)
- Atlantic petrel, Pterodroma incerta (A)
- Jouanin's petrel, Bulweria fallax (A)
- Flesh-footed shearwater, Ardenna carneipes (A)
- Tropical shearwater, Ardenna bailloni
- Persian shearwater, Puffinus persicus (A)

== Storks ==
Order: Ciconiiformes Family: Ciconiidae

Storks are large, long-legged, long-necked, wading birds with long, stout bills. Storks are mute, but bill-clattering is an important mode of communication at the nest. Their nests can be large and may be reused for many years. Many species are migratory.

- Black stork, Ciconia nigra
- Abdim's stork, Ciconia abdimii
- White stork, Ciconia ciconia
- Marabou stork, Leptoptilos crumenifer (A)
- Yellow-billed stork, Mycteria ibis

== Frigatebirds ==
Order: Suliformes Family: Fregatidae

Frigatebirds are large seabirds usually found over tropical oceans. They are large, black-and-white or completely black, with long wings and deeply forked tails. The males have coloured inflatable throat pouches. They do not swim or walk and cannot take off from a flat surface. Having the largest wingspan-to-body-weight ratio of any bird, they are essentially aerial, able to stay aloft for more than a week.

- Lesser frigatebird, Fregata ariel (A)

== Boobies and gannets ==
Order: Suliformes Family: Sulidae

The sulids comprise the gannets and boobies. Both groups are medium to large coastal seabirds that plunge-dive for fish.

- Masked booby, Sula dactylatra (A)
- Brown booby, Sula leucogaster
- Red-footed booby, Sula sula (A)

== Cormorants and shags ==
Order: Suliformes Family: Phalacrocoracidae

Phalacrocoracidae is a family of medium to large coastal, fish-eating seabirds that includes cormorants and shags. Plumage colouration varies, with the majority having mainly dark plumage, some species being black-and-white and a few being colourful.

- Long-tailed cormorant, Microcarbo africanus (A)
- Socotra cormorant, Phalacrocorax nigrogularis (A)

== Pelicans ==
Order: Pelecaniformes Family: Pelecanidae

Pelicans are large water birds with a distinctive pouch under their beak. As with other members of the order Pelecaniformes, they have webbed feet with four toes.

- Great white pelican, Pelecanus onocrotalus
- Pink-backed pelican, Pelecanus rufescens

== Hammerkop ==
Order: Pelecaniformes Family: Scopidae

The hammerkop is a medium-sized bird with a long shaggy crest. The shape of its head with a curved bill and crest at the back is reminiscent of a hammer, hence its name. Its plumage is drab-brown all over.

- Hamerkop, Scopus umbretta

== Herons, egrets, and bitterns ==
Order: Pelecaniformes Family: Ardeidae

The family Ardeidae contains the bitterns, herons and egrets. Herons and egrets are medium to large wading birds with long necks and legs. Bitterns tend to be shorter necked and more wary. Members of Ardeidae fly with their necks retracted, unlike other long-necked birds such as storks, ibises and spoonbills.

- Yellow bittern, Ixobrychus sinensis (A)
- Little bittern, Ixobrychus minutus
- Gray heron, Ardea cinerea
- Black-headed heron, Ardea melanocephala
- Goliath heron, Ardea goliath
- Purple heron, Ardea purpurea
- Great egret, Ardea alba
- Intermediate egret, Ardea intermedia (A)
- Little egret, Egretta garzetta
- Western reef-heron, Egretta gularis
- Black heron, Egretta ardesiaca
- Cattle egret, Bubulcus ibis
- Squacco heron, Ardeola ralloides
- Striated heron, Butorides striata
- Black-crowned night-heron, Nycticorax nycticorax (A)

== Ibises and spoonbills ==
Order: Pelecaniformes Family: Threskiornithidae

Threskiornithidae is a family of large terrestrial and wading birds which includes the ibises and spoonbills. They have long, broad wings with 11 primary and about 20 secondary feathers. They are strong fliers and despite their size and weight, very capable soarers.

- Glossy ibis, Plegadis falcinellus
- African sacred ibis, Threskiornis aethiopicus
- Eurasian spoonbill, Platalea leucorodia
- African spoonbill, Platalea alba

== Secretarybird ==
Order: Accipitriformes Family: Sagittariidae

The secretarybird is a bird of prey in the order Accipitriformes but is easily distinguished from other raptors by its long crane-like legs.

- Secretarybird, Sagittarius serpentarius (A)

== Osprey ==
Order: Accipitriformes Family: Pandionidae

The family Pandionidae contains only one species, the osprey. The osprey is a medium-large raptor which is a specialist fish-eater with a worldwide distribution.

- Osprey, Pandion haliaetus

== Hawks, eagles, and kites ==
Order: Accipitriformes Family: Accipitridae

Accipitridae is a family of birds of prey, which includes hawks, eagles, kites, harriers and Old World vultures. These birds have powerful hooked beaks for tearing flesh from their prey, strong legs, powerful talons and keen eyesight.

- Black-winged kite, Elanus caeruleus (A)
- Scissor-tailed kite, Chelictinia riocourii
- Bearded vulture, Gypaetus barbatus (A)
- Egyptian vulture, Neophron percnopterus
- European honey-buzzard, Pernis apivorus
- Oriental honey-buzzard, Pernis ptilorhynchus (A)
- White-headed vulture, Trigonoceps occipitalis
- Lappet-faced vulture, Torgos tracheliotos
- Hooded vulture, Necrosyrtes monachus
- White-backed vulture, Gyps africanus
- Rüppell's griffon, Gyps rueppelli
- Eurasian griffon, Gyps fulvus (A)
- Bateleur, Terathopius ecaudatus
- Short-toed snake-eagle, Circaetus gallicus
- Long-crested eagle, Lophaetus occipitalis (A)
- Lesser spotted eagle, Clanga pomarina
- Greater spotted eagle, Clanga clanga
- Booted eagle, Hieraaetus pennatus
- Tawny eagle, Aquila rapax (A)
- Steppe eagle, Aquila nipalensis
- Imperial eagle, Aquila heliaca
- Verreaux's eagle, Aquila verreauxii
- Bonelli's eagle, Aquila fasciata
- African hawk-eagle, Aquila spilogaster (A)
- Dark chanting-goshawk, Melierax metabates
- Eastern chanting-goshawk, Melierax poliopterus
- Grasshopper buzzard, Butastur rufipennis (A)
- Eurasian marsh-harrier, Circus aeruginosus
- Hen harrier, Circus cyaneus
- Pallid harrier, Circus macrourus
- Montagu's harrier, Circus pygargus
- Shikra, Accipiter badius
- Levant sparrowhawk, Accipiter brevipes
- Eurasian sparrowhawk, Accipiter nisus
- Black kite, Milvus migrans
- Common buzzard, Buteo buteo
- Long-legged buzzard, Buteo rufinus
- Augur buzzard, Buteo augur

== Owls ==
Order: Strigiformes Family: Strigidae

The typical owls are small to large solitary nocturnal birds of prey. They have large forward-facing eyes and ears, a hawk-like beak and a conspicuous circle of feathers around each eye called a facial disk.

- African scops-owl, Otus senegalensis
- Northern white-faced owl, Ptilopsis leucotis
- Grayish eagle-owl, Bubo cinerascens
- Verreaux's eagle-owl, Bubo lacteus
- Little owl, Athene noctua
- Short-eared owl, Asio flammeus (A)

== Mousebirds ==
Order: Coliiformes Family: Coliidae

The mousebirds are slender greyish or brown birds with soft, hairlike body feathers and very long thin tails. They are arboreal and scurry through the leaves like rodents in search of berries, fruit and buds. They are acrobatic and can feed upside down. All species have strong claws and reversible outer toes. They also have crests and stubby bills.

- Speckled mousebird, Colius striatus
- Blue-naped mousebird, Urocolius macrourus

== Hoopoes ==
Order: Bucerotiformes Family: Upupidae

Hoopoes have black, white and orangey-pink colouring with a large erectile crest on their head.

- Eurasian hoopoe, Upupa epops

== Hornbills ==
Order: Bucerotiformes Family: Bucerotidae

Hornbills are a group of birds whose bill is shaped like a cow's horn, but without a twist, sometimes with a casque on the upper mandible. Frequently, the bill is brightly coloured.

- Hemprich's hornbill, Lophoceros hemprichii
- Eastern yellow-billed hornbill, Tockus flavirostris

== Kingfishers ==
Order: Coraciiformes Family: Alcedinidae

Kingfishers are medium-sized birds with large heads, long, pointed bills, short legs and stubby tails.

- Malachite kingfisher, Corythornis cristatus
- Gray-headed kingfisher, Halcyon leucocephala

== Bee-eaters ==
Order: Coraciiformes Family: Meropidae

The bee-eaters are a group of near passerine birds in the family Meropidae. Most species are found in Africa but others occur in southern Europe, Madagascar, Australia and New Guinea. They are characterised by richly coloured plumage, slender bodies and usually elongated central tail feathers. All are colourful and have long downturned bills and pointed wings, which give them a swallow-like appearance when seen from afar.

- White-throated bee-eater, Merops albicollis
- Blue-cheeked bee-eater, Merops persicus
- Madagascar bee-eater, Merops superciliosus (A)
- European bee-eater, Merops apiaster

== Rollers ==
Order: Coraciiformes Family: Coraciidae

Rollers resemble crows in size and build, but are more closely related to the kingfishers and bee-eaters. They share the colourful appearance of those groups with blues and browns predominating. The two inner front toes are connected, but the outer toe is not.

- European roller, Coracias garrulus
- Abyssinian roller, Coracias abyssinica (A)
- Rufous-crowned roller, Coracias naevius (A)

== African barbets ==
Order: Piciformes Family: Lybiidae

The barbets are plump birds, with short necks and large heads. They get their name from the bristles which fringe their heavy bills. Most species are brightly coloured.

- Yellow-breasted barbet, Trachyphonus margaritatus
- Black-throated barbet, Tricholaema melanocephala

== Woodpeckers ==
Order: Piciformes Family: Picidae

Woodpeckers are small to medium-sized birds with chisel-like beaks, short legs, stiff tails and long tongues used for capturing insects. Some species have feet with two toes pointing forward and two backward, while several species have only three toes. Many woodpeckers have the habit of tapping noisily on tree trunks with their beaks.

- Eurasian wryneck, Jynx torquilla
- Cardinal woodpecker, Chloropicus fuscescens
- Nubian woodpecker, Campethera nubica

== Caracaras and falcons ==
Order: Falconiformes Family: Falconidae

Falconidae is a family of diurnal birds of prey. They differ from hawks, eagles and kites in that they kill with their beaks instead of their talons.

- Lesser kestrel, Falco naumanni
- Eurasian kestrel, Falco tinnunculus
- Fox kestrel, Falco alopex (A)
- Red-footed falcon, Falco vespertinus (A)
- Eleonora's falcon, Falco eleonorae (A)
- Sooty falcon, Falco concolor
- Eurasian hobby, Falco subbuteo
- Lanner falcon, Falco biarmicus
- Saker falcon, Falco cherrug (A)
- Peregrine falcon, Falco peregrinus

== Old World parrots ==
Order: Psittaciformes Family: Psittaculidae

Characteristic features of parrots include a strong curved bill, an upright stance, strong legs, and clawed zygodactyl feet. Many parrots are vividly colored, and some are multi-colored. In size they range from 8 cm (3.1 in) to 1 m (3.3 ft) in length. Old World parrots are found from Africa east across south and southeast Asia and Oceania to Australia and New Zealand.

- Rose-ringed parakeet, Psittacula krameri

== Old World orioles ==
Order: Passeriformes Family: Oriolidae

The Old World orioles are colourful passerine birds. They are not related to the New World orioles.

- Eurasian golden oriole, Oriolus oriolus

== Wattle-eyes and batises ==
Order: Passeriformes Family: Platysteiridae

The wattle-eyes, or puffback flycatchers, are small stout passerine birds of the African tropics. They get their name from the brightly coloured fleshy eye decorations found in most species in this group.

- Gray-headed batis, Batis orientalis

== Bushshrikes and allies ==
Order: Passeriformes Family: Malaconotidae

Bushshrikes are similar in habits to shrikes, hunting insects and other small prey from a perch on a bush. Although similar in build to the shrikes, these tend to be either colourful species or largely black; some species are quite secretive.

- Black-crowned tchagra, Tchagra senegala
- Ethiopian boubou, Laniarius aethiopicus
- Rosy-patched bushshrike, Rhodophoneus cruentus

== Drongos ==
Order: Passeriformes Family: Dicruridae

The drongos are mostly black or dark grey in colour, sometimes with metallic tints. They have long forked tails, and some Asian species have elaborate tail decorations. They have short legs and sit very upright when perched, like a shrike. They flycatch or take prey from the ground.

- Glossy-backed drongo, Dicrurus divaricatus

== Monarch flycatchers ==
Order: Passeriformes Family: Monarchidae

The monarch flycatchers are small to medium-sized insectivorous passerines which hunt by flycatching.

- African paradise-flycatcher, Terpsiphone viridis

== Shrikes ==
Order: Passeriformes Family: Laniidae

Shrikes are passerine birds known for their habit of catching other birds and small animals and impaling the uneaten portions of their bodies on thorns. A typical shrike's beak is hooked, like a bird of prey.

- Red-backed shrike, Lanius collurio
- Red-tailed shrike, Lanius phoenicuroides
- Isabelline shrike, Lanius isabellinus
- Great gray shrike, Lanius excubitor (A)
- Lesser gray shrike, Lanius minor
- Somali fiscal, Lanius somalicus (A)
- Masked shrike, Lanius nubicus

== Crows, jays, and magpies ==
Order: Passeriformes Family: Corvidae

The family Corvidae includes crows, ravens, jays, choughs, magpies, treepies, nutcrackers and ground jays. Corvids are above average in size among the Passeriformes, and some of the larger species show high levels of intelligence.

- House crow, Corvus splendens (I)
- Pied crow, Corvus albus
- Somali crow, Corvus edithae
- Fan-tailed raven, Corvus rhipidurus

== Larks ==
Order: Passeriformes Family: Alaudidae

Larks are small terrestrial birds with often extravagant songs and display flights. Most larks are fairly dull in appearance. Their food is insects and seeds.

- Greater hoopoe-lark, Alaemon alaudipes
- Desert lark, Ammomanes deserti
- Black-crowned sparrow-lark, Eremopterix nigriceps
- Greater short-toed lark, Calandrella brachydactyla (A)
- Bimaculated lark, Melanocorypha bimaculata (A)
- Crested lark, Galerida cristata

== African warblers ==
Order: Passeriformes Family: Macrosphenidae

African warblers are small to medium-sized insectivores which are found in a wide variety of habitats south of the Sahara.

- Northern crombec, Sylvietta brachyura

== Cisticolas and allies ==
Order: Passeriformes Family: Cisticolidae

The Cisticolidae are warblers found mainly in warmer southern regions of the Old World. They are generally very small birds of drab brown or grey appearance found in open country such as grassland or scrub.

- Green-backed camaroptera, Camaroptera brachyura
- Cricket longtail, Spiloptila clamans
- Graceful prinia, Prinia gracilis
- Pale prinia, Prinia somalica (A)
- Red-fronted prinia, Prinia rufifrons

== Reed warblers and allies ==
Order: Passeriformes Family: Acrocephalidae

The members of this family are usually rather large for "warblers". Most are rather plain olivaceous brown above with much yellow to beige below. They are usually found in open woodland, reedbeds, or tall grass. The family occurs mostly in southern to western Eurasia and surroundings, but it also ranges far into the Pacific, with some species in Africa.

- Eastern olivaceous warbler, Iduna pallida
- Upcher's warbler, Hippolais languida
- Olive-tree warbler, Hippolais olivetorum (A)
- Sedge warbler, Acrocephalus schoenobaenus (A)
- Marsh warbler, Acrocephalus palustris (A)
- Common reed warbler, Acrocephalus scirpaceus (A)
- Great reed warbler, Acrocephalus arundinaceus (A)
- Clamorous reed warbler, Acrocephalus stentoreus (A)

== Grassbirds and allies ==
Order: Passeriformes Family: Locustellidae

Locustellidae are a family of small insectivorous songbirds found mainly in Eurasia, Africa, and the Australian region. They are smallish birds with tails that are usually long and pointed, and tend to be drab brownish or buffy all over.

- River warbler, Locustella fluviatilis (A)
- Savi's warbler, Locustella luscinioides (A)
- Little rush warbler, Bradypterus baboecala

== Swallows ==
Order: Passeriformes Family: Hirundinidae

The family Hirundinidae is adapted to aerial feeding. They have a slender streamlined body, long pointed wings and a short bill with a wide gape. The feet are adapted to perching rather than walking, and the front toes are partially joined at the base.

- Bank swallow, Riparia riparia
- Rock martin, Ptyonoprogne fuligula
- Barn swallow, Hirundo rustica
- Red-rumped swallow, Cecropis daurica (A)
- Common house-martin, Delichon urbicum (A)

== Bulbuls ==
Order: Passeriformes Family: Pycnonotidae

Bulbuls are medium-sized songbirds. Some are colourful with yellow, red or orange vents, cheeks, throats or supercilia, but most are drab, with uniform olive-brown to black plumage. Some species have distinct crests.

- Common bulbul, Pycnonotus barbatus

== Leaf warblers ==
Order: Passeriformes Family: Phylloscopidae

Leaf warblers are a family of small insectivorous birds found mostly in Eurasia and ranging into Wallacea and Africa. The species are of various sizes, often green-plumaged above and yellow below, or more subdued with greyish-green to greyish-brown colours.

- Wood warbler, Phylloscopus sibilatrix
- Willow warbler, Phylloscopus trochilus
- Common chiffchaff, Phylloscopus collybita
- Brown woodland-warbler, Phylloscopus umbrovirens

== Sylviid warblers, parrotbills, and allies ==
Order: Passeriformes Family: Sylviidae

The family Sylviidae is a group of small insectivorous passerine birds. They mainly occur as breeding species, as the common name implies, in Europe, Asia and, to a lesser extent, Africa. Most are of generally undistinguished appearance, but many have distinctive songs.

- Eurasian blackcap, Sylvia atricapilla
- Garden warbler, Sylvia borin (A)
- Barred warbler, Curruca nisoria
- Lesser whitethroat, Curruca curruca
- Arabian warbler, Curruca leucomelaena
- Western Orphean warbler, Curruca hortensis
- Eastern Orphean warbler, Curruca crassirostris (A)
- Asian desert warbler, Curruca nana
- Menetries's warbler, Curruca mystacea
- Rüppell's warbler, Curruca ruppeli (A)
- Eastern subalpine warbler, Curruca cantillans
- Greater whitethroat, Curruca communis

== White-eyes, yuhinas, and allies ==
Order: Passeriformes Family: Zosteropidae

The white-eyes are small and mostly undistinguished, their plumage above being generally some dull colour like greenish-olive, but some species have a white or bright yellow throat, breast or lower parts, and several have buff flanks. As their name suggests, many species have a white ring around each eye.

- Abyssinian white-eye, Zosterops abyssinicus

== Laughingthrushes and allies ==
Order: Passeriformes Family: Leiothrichidae

The laughingthrushes are somewhat diverse in size and colouration, but are characterised by soft fluffy plumage.

- Arabian babbler, Argya squamiceps (A)

== Oxpeckers ==
Order: Passeriformes Family: Buphagidae

As both the English and scientific names of these birds imply, they feed on ectoparasites, primarily ticks, found on large mammals.

- Red-billed oxpecker, Buphagus erythrorynchus

== Starlings ==
Order: Passeriformes Family: Sturnidae

Starlings are small to medium-sized passerine birds. Their flight is strong and direct and they are very gregarious. Their preferred habitat is fairly open country. They eat insects and fruit. Plumage is typically dark with a metallic sheen.

- European starling, Sturnus vulgaris (A)
- Rosy starling, Pastor roseus (A)
- Wattled starling, Creatophora cinerea
- Violet-backed starling, Cinnyricinclus leucogaster
- Somali starling, Onychognathus blythii
- White-crowned starling, Lamprotornis albicapillus

== Thrushes and allies ==
Order: Passeriformes Family: Turdidae

The thrushes are a group of passerine birds that occur mainly in the Old World. They are plump, soft plumaged, small to medium-sized insectivores or sometimes omnivores, often feeding on the ground. Many have attractive songs.

- Song thrush, Turdus philomelos

== Old World flycatchers ==
Order: Passeriformes Family: Muscicapidae

Old World flycatchers are a large group of small passerine birds native to the Old World. They are mainly small arboreal insectivores. The appearance of these birds is highly varied, but they mostly have weak songs and harsh calls.

- Spotted flycatcher, Muscicapa striata
- Gambaga flycatcher, Muscicapa gambagae
- Black scrub-robin, Cercotrichas podobe
- Rufous-tailed scrub-robin, Cercotrichas galactotes
- White-throated robin, Irania gutturalis
- Thrush nightingale, Luscinia luscinia (A)
- Common nightingale, Luscinia megarhynchos (A)
- Bluethroat, Luscinia svecica (A)
- Semicollared flycatcher, Ficedula semitorquata (A)
- Common redstart, Phoenicurus phoenicurus
- Black redstart, Phoenicurus ochruros
- Little rock-thrush, Monticola solitarius
- Rufous-tailed rock-thrush, Monticola saxatilis
- Blue rock-thrush, Monticola solitarius
- Whinchat, Saxicola rubetra
- European stonechat, Saxicola rubicola
- Siberian stonechat, Saxicola maurus (A)
- African stonechat, Saxicola torquatus
- Northern wheatear, Oenanthe oenanthe
- Red-breasted wheatear, Oenanthe bottae (A)
- Isabelline wheatear, Oenanthe isabellina
- Heuglin's wheatear, Oenanthe heuglini (A)
- Hooded wheatear, Oenanthe monacha (A)
- Desert wheatear, Oenanthe deserti
- Western black-eared wheatear, Oenanthe hispanica
- Cyprus wheatear, Oenanthe cypriaca (A)
- Eastern black-eared wheatear, Oenanthe melanoleuca (A)
- Pied wheatear, Oenanthe pleschanka
- Blackstart, Oenanthe melanura
- Brown-tailed chat, Oenanthe scotocerca (A)
- White-crowned wheatear, Oenanthe leucopyga
- Kurdish wheatear, Oenanthe xanthoprymna (A)

== Sunbirds and spiderhunters ==
Order: Passeriformes Family: Nectariniidae

The sunbirds and spiderhunters are very small passerine birds which feed largely on nectar, although they will also take insects, especially when feeding young. Flight is fast and direct on their short wings. Most species can take nectar by hovering like a hummingbird, but usually perch to feed.

- Eastern violet-backed sunbird, Anthreptes orientalis (A)
- Nile Valley sunbird, Hedydipna metallica
- Beautiful sunbird, Cinnyris pulchellus
- Shining sunbird, Cinnyris habessinicus
- Variable sunbird, Cinnyris venustus (A)

== Weavers and allies ==
Order: Passeriformes Family: Ploceidae

The weavers are small passerine birds related to the finches. They are seed-eating birds with rounded conical bills. The males of many species are brightly coloured, usually in red or yellow and black, some species show variation in colour only in the breeding season.

- Lesser masked weaver, Ploceus intermedius
- Rüppell's weaver, Ploceus galbula
- Village weaver, Ploceus cucullatus (A)
- Red-billed quelea, Quelea quelea (A)

== Waxbills and allies ==
Order: Passeriformes Family: Estrildidae

The estrildid finches are small passerine birds of the Old World tropics and Australasia. They are gregarious and often colonial seed eaters with short thick but pointed bills. They are all similar in structure and habits, but have wide variation in plumage colours and patterns.

- African silverbill, Euodice cantans
- Crimson-rumped waxbill, Estrilda rhodopyga
- Quailfinch, Ortygospiza atricollis (A)
- Cut-throat, Amadina fasciata (A)
- Green-winged pytilia, Pytilia melba
- Red-billed firefinch, Lagonosticta senegala

== Indigobirds ==
Order: Passeriformes Family: Viduidae

The indigobirds are finch-like species which usually have black or indigo predominating in their plumage. All are brood parasites, which lay their eggs in the nests of estrildid finches.

- Pin-tailed whydah, Vidua macroura (A)
- Village indigobird, Vidua chalybeata (A)

== Old World sparrows ==
Order: Passeriformes Family: Passeridae

Old World sparrows are small passerine birds. In general, sparrows tend to be small, plump, brown or grey birds with short tails and short powerful beaks. Sparrows are seed eaters, but they also consume small insects.

- House sparrow, Passer domesticus (I)
- Somali sparrow, Passer castanopterus
- Swainson's sparrow, Passer swainsonii
- Arabian golden sparrow, Passer euchlorus
- Pale rockfinch, Carpospiza brachydactyla

== Wagtails and pipits ==
Order: Passeriformes Family: Motacillidae

Motacillidae is a family of small passerine birds with medium to long tails. They include the wagtails, longclaws and pipits. They are slender, ground feeding insectivores of open country.

- Gray wagtail, Motacilla cinerea
- Western yellow wagtail, Motacilla flava
- Citrine wagtail, Motacilla citreola (A)
- White wagtail, Motacilla alba
- African pipit, Anthus cinnamomeus
- Long-billed pipit, Anthus similis
- Tawny pipit, Anthus campestris
- Tree pipit, Anthus trivialis
- Red-throated pipit, Anthus cervinus
- Golden pipit, Tmetothylacus tenellus (A)

== Finches, euphonias, and allies ==
Order: Passeriformes Family: Fringillidae

Finches are seed-eating passerine birds, that are small to moderately large and have a strong beak, usually conical and in some species very large. All have twelve tail feathers and nine primaries. These birds have a bouncing flight with alternating bouts of flapping and gliding on closed wings, and most sing well.

- Trumpeter finch, Bucanetes githagineus (A)
- Reichenow's seedeater, Crithagra reichenowi
- Yellow-rumped serin, Crithagra xanthopygia (A)

== Old World buntings ==
Order: Passeriformes Family: Emberizidae

The emberizids are a large family of passerine birds. They are seed-eating birds with distinctively shaped bills. Many emberizid species have distinctive head patterns.

- Ortolan bunting, Emberiza hortulana
- Cretzschmar's bunting, Emberiza caesia (A)
- Cinnamon-breasted bunting, Emberiza tahapisi
- Striolated bunting, Emberiza striolata

== See also ==
- List of birds
- Lists of birds by region
