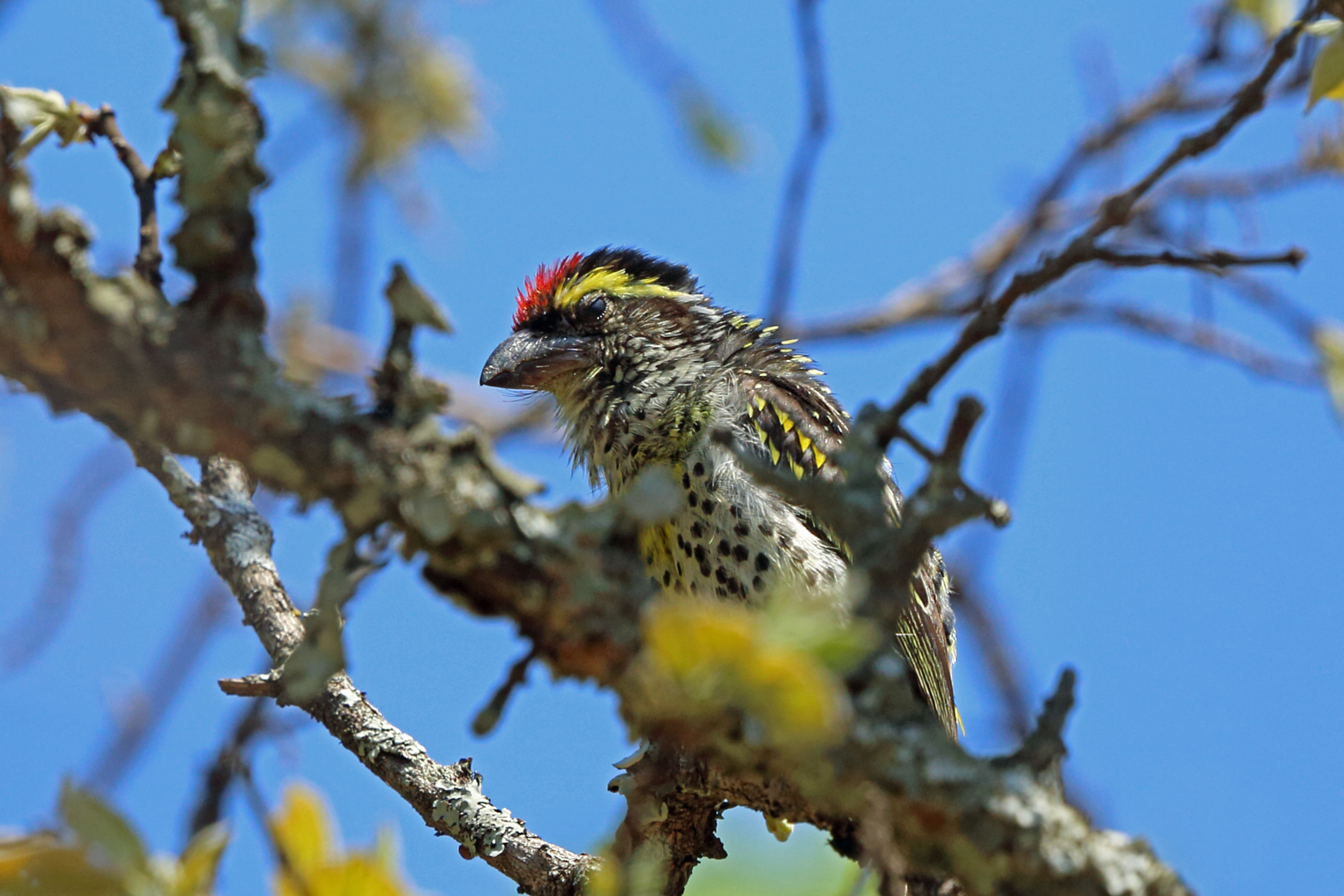

Conservation status
- Least Concern (IUCN 3.1)

Scientific classification
- Kingdom: Animalia
- Phylum: Chordata
- Class: Aves
- Order: Piciformes
- Family: Lybiidae
- Genus: Tricholaema
- Species: T. frontata

Binomial name
- Tricholaema frontata (Cabanis, 1881)
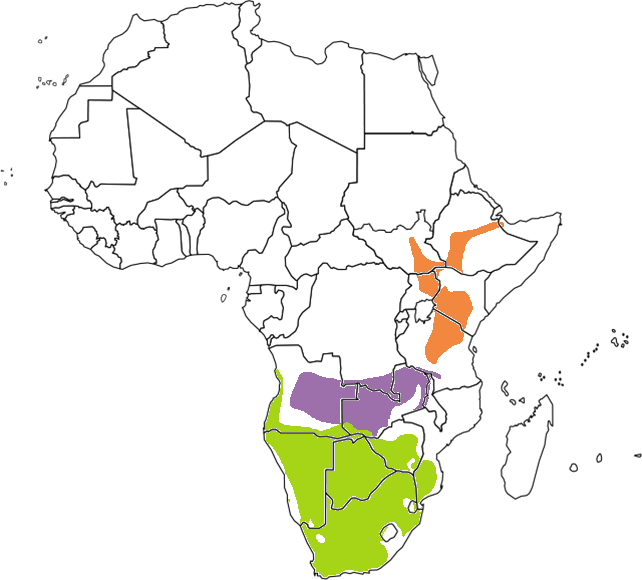
- Tricholaema diademata Tricholaema frontata Tricholaema leucomelas

Synonyms
- Pogonorhynchus frontatus

= Miombo pied barbet =

Species of bird

The miombo pied barbet (Tricholaema frontata) is a species of bird in the family Lybiidae. It is found in south-central Africa.

== Taxonomy ==
The miombo pied barbet was described as Pogonorhynchus frontatus by Cabanis in 1880. The species is monotypic.

== Distribution and habitat ==
This species is found in central Angola, the south of the Democratic Republic of the Congo, western Malawi, southwest Tanzania, and Zambia. It is found at elevations of 500–1,520 m (1,640–4,990 ft), and the size of its range is estimated at 2,490,000 km^{2} (960,000 sq mi). Its habitat is mainly dense miombo woodland, but it has also been observed in more open areas, including degraded woodland and grassy areas with patches of trees.

== Description ==
Its length is approximately 16 cm (6.3 in), and its weight is 24.5–28 g (0.86–0.99 oz). The male and female are alike. The adult has a black head. with a red spot on the forecrown. There is white scalloping on the black nape. The ear coverts are brown, and there are yellow lines over the eyes. The chin and throat are white, with brown or black scalloping. The back is black, with yellow spots. The tail is brown-black, and the undertail is pale brown-grey. The flight feathers are brown, with white inner edges. The inner primaries and the secondaries have white-yellow outer edges. The wing coverts are black-brown, with yellow tips. The scapulars have white spots. The eyes are dark brown. The beak is mostly brown, with a tomial tooth. The legs are grey-brown to grey, and the claws are pale grey. The immature has laxer plumage and does not have a tomial tooth.

== Behaviour ==
Its diet includes insects and fruits. Its song is a series of hoop notes, and it also produces nyah, ddddt and yeh calls. The male has been observed to puff its throat and rotate its head while singing. The nest is a cavity excavated in a tree or stub. The eggs are usually laid from September to December. There are two to three white eggs in a clutch. The incubation period and nestling period are not known. The young are fed insects, and then the parent birds change the food to fruits. The parents remove faeces and seeds. It hybridises with the acacia pied barbet (Tricholaema leucomelas) in southwest Zambia.

== Status ==
The population size of this species is not known. Its population is declining because of habitat loss, but not quickly enough for the species to be considered vulnerable. The species also has a large range, so the IUCN Red List has assessed the species to be of least concern.
