= Djibouti Telecom =

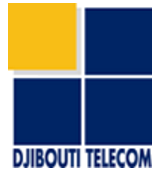
- Industry: Telecommunications
- Headquarters: Djibouti, Djibouti
- Products: Mobile services Internet services Fixed line Digital television
- Services: mobile, fixed line and broadband services
- Website: www.djiboutitelecom.dj

Djibouti Telecom (Djibouti Télécommunication Co.) is the government-run telecommunications monopoly in Djibouti, Djibouti. It provides landline, mobile, and internet services to the general public. The firm has its head offices and outlets in the national capital. In late 2013 the company finally unveiled its 3G service throughout the country and as of 2017 has unveiled 4G+ service. The company's main internet offerings for internet throughout the country are currently specifically focused on ADSL service.

== Network and Infrastructure ==
Djibouti Telecom offers a telecommunications infrastructure with significant investments in data centers, teleport facilities, and peering agreements with major global internet providers. The company’s strategic presence in international locations, such as Marseille, Palermo, Dubai, and Singapore, allows it to maintain robust network connectivity and high bandwidth availability.

To enhance its network resilience, Djibouti Telecom has constructed two additional cable landing stations and expanded its terrestrial and submarine cable systems. These efforts position Djibouti as a vital player in the global telecommunications landscape, linking over 90 countries.

== Recent Developments ==
In 2013, Djibouti Telecom launched its 3G network nationwide, and by 2017, it introduced 4G+ services to improve mobile broadband speeds. The company has also implemented initiatives to expand broadband internet access through ADSL and other high-speed solutions.

== See also ==
- Communications in Djibouti
- La Poste de Djibouti
