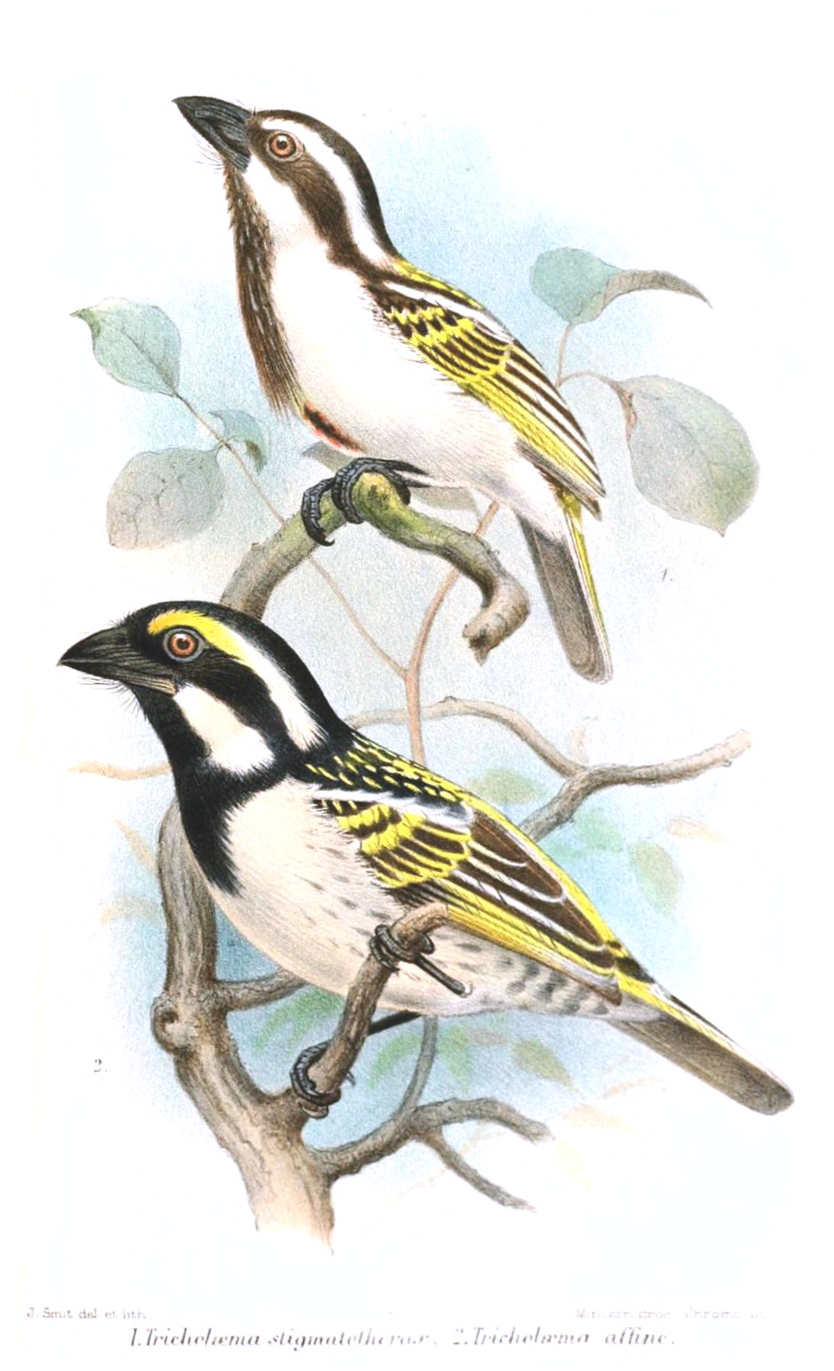
- Black-throated barbet (above), and pied barbet (below); illustration by Joseph Smit, 1891 Calls recorded in southwest Kenya

Conservation status
- Least Concern (IUCN 3.1)

Scientific classification
- Kingdom: Animalia
- Phylum: Chordata
- Class: Aves
- Order: Piciformes
- Family: Lybiidae
- Genus: Tricholaema
- Species: T. melanocephala

Binomial name
- Tricholaema melanocephala (Cretzschmar, 1829)

Subspecies
- T. m. melanocephala – (Cretzschmar, 1829); T. m. blandi – Lort Phillips, 1897; T. m. stigmatothorax – Cabanis, 1878; T. m. flavibuccalis – Reichenow, 1893

Synonyms
- Tricholaema stigmatothorax

= Black-throated barbet =

Species of bird

The black-throated barbet (Tricholaema melanocephala) is a species of bird in the Lybiidae family. It is found in Djibouti, Eritrea, Ethiopia, Kenya, Somalia, South Sudan, Tanzania, and Uganda. Its distribution has moved northward.

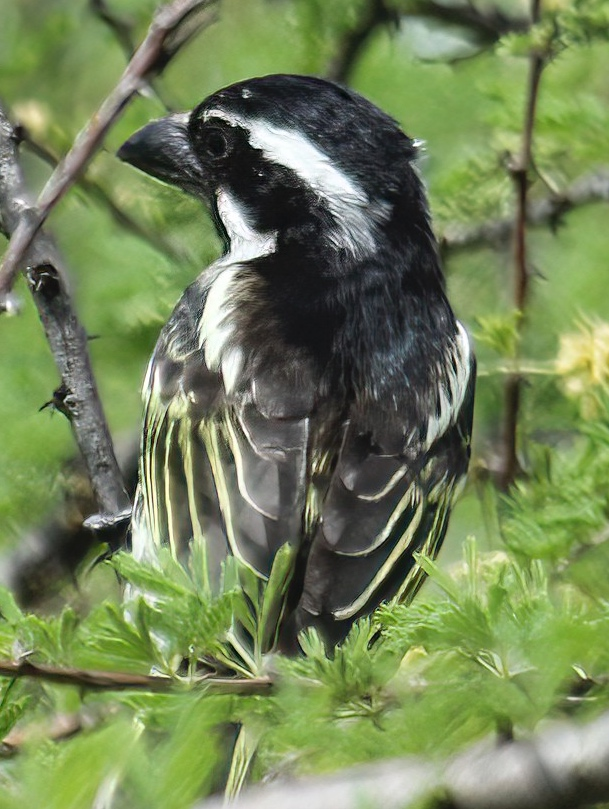
Seen at Lake Bogoria – Kenya
