= Military history of Djibouti =

The military history of Djibouti encompasses the major conflicts involving the historic empires and sultanates in the territory of present-day Djibouti, through to modern times. It also covers the martial traditions and hardware employed by Djiboutian armies and their opponents.

In antiquity, the territory was part of the Land of Punt. The Djibouti area, along with other localities in the Horn region, was later the seat of the medieval Adal and Ifat Sultanates. In the late 19th century, the colony of French Somaliland was established following treaties signed by the ruling Issa Somali and Afar Sultans with the French. It was subsequently renamed to the French Territory of the Afars and the Issas in 1967. A decade later, the Djiboutian people voted for independence, officially marking the establishment of the Republic of Djibouti.

== Ancient and Medieval ==
=== Ifat-Solomonic Wars ===
Taddesse Tamrat explains Sultan Umar's military expedition as an effort to consolidate the Muslim territories in the Horn, in much the same way as Emperor Yekuno Amlak was attempting to unite the Christian territories in the highlands during the same period. These two states inevitably came into conflict over Shewa and territories further south. A lengthy war ensued, but the Muslim sultanates of the time were not strongly unified. Ifat was finally defeated by Emperor Amda Seyon I of Ethiopia in 1332, and withdrew from Shewa.

=== Conquest of Abyssinia ===
In the mid-1520s, Imam Ahmad ibn Ibrihim al-Ghazi conquered Adal and launched a holy war against Christian Ethiopia, which was then under the leadership of Lebna Dengel. Supplied by the Ottoman Empire with firearms, Ahmad was able to defeat the Ethiopians at the Battle of Shimbra Kure in 1529 and seize control of the wealthy Ethiopian Highlands, though the Ethiopians continued to resist from the highlands. In 1541, the Portuguese, who had vested interests in the Indian Ocean, sent aid to the Ethiopians in the form of 400 musketeers. Adal, in response, received 900 from the Ottomans.

Imam Ahmad was initially successful against the Ethiopians while campaigning in the Autumn of 1542, killing the Portuguese commander Cristóvão da Gama in August that year. However, Portuguese musketry proved decisive in Adal's defeat at the Battle of Wayna Daga, near Lake Tana, in February 1543, where Ahmad was killed in battle. The Ethiopians subsequently retook the Amhara plateau and recouped their losses against Adal. The Ottomans, who had their own troubles to deal with in the Mediterranean, were unable to help Ahmad's successors. When Adal collapsed in 1577, the seat of the Sultanate shifted from Harar to Aussa in the desert region of Afar and a new sultanate began.

== Early modern ==
=== British invasion of French Somaliland ===
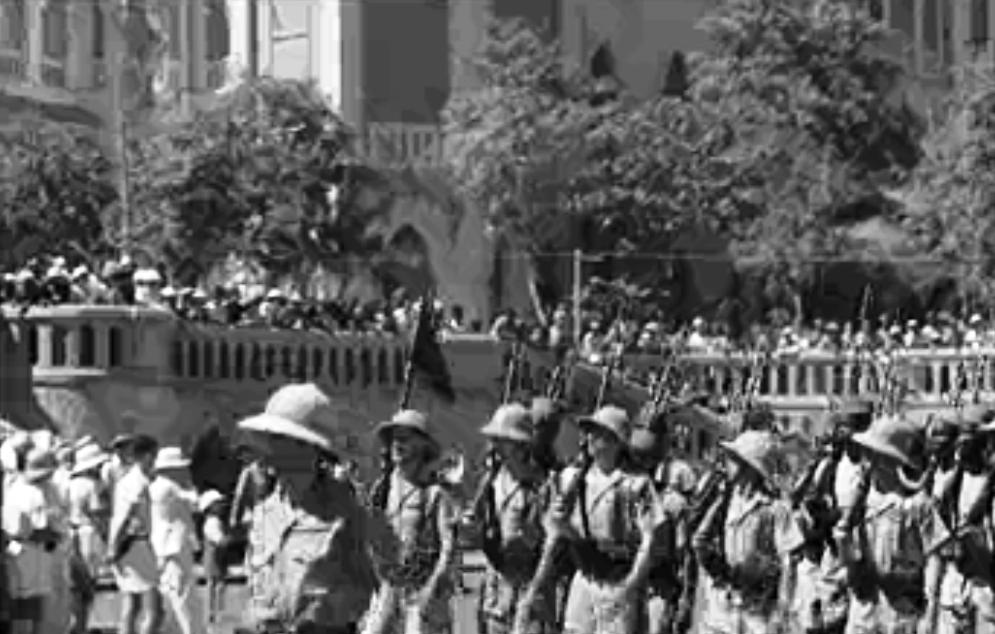
British Military Parade in Presidential Palace, Djibouti City 1942

During the Italian invasion and occupation of Ethiopia in the mid-1930s and during the early stages of World War II, constant border skirmishes occurred between the forces in French Somaliland and the forces in Italian East Africa. After the fall of France in 1940, French Somaliland declared loyalty to Vichy France. The colony remained loyal to Vichy France during the East African Campaign but stayed out of that conflict. British forces in Ethiopia begin dropping leaflets calling on the French Somaliland to rally to Free France. The newspaper Djibouti Libre published in Dire Dawa is also air dropped into the Vichy controlled colony and a 15-minute newscast is broadcast over the radio.

1942: Vichy recalls Governor Pierre Nouailhetas after his superiors decide that he is in too close contact with the British. Nouailhetas delegates his authority to the military commander General Truffert. Two battalions, accompanied by civilians, leave Djibouti to join the British forces in British Somaliland. General Truffert is forced to resign and cede power to his adjutant General Dupont after a great majority of Djibouti's military and civil administrators threaten to leave for British held Somaliland. This lasted until December 1942. By that time, the Italians had been defeated and the French colony was isolated by a British blockade. Free French and Allied forces recaptured the colony's capital of Djibouti at the end of 1942. A local battalion from Djibouti participated in the liberation of France in 1944.

== Modern ==
=== Ogaden War ===
The Ogaden War (12 July 1977 – 15 March 1978) was a conflict fought between the Ethiopian government and Somali government. The Djibouti government supported Somalia with military intelligence. In a notable illustration of the nature of Cold War alliances, the Soviet Union switched from supplying aid to Somalia to supporting Ethiopia, which had previously been backed by the United States. According to Ethiopian sources, the invaders numbered 70,000 troops, 40 fighter planes, 250 tanks, 350 armoured personnel carriers, and 600 artillery. By the end of the month 60% of the Ogaden had been taken by the SNA-WSLF force, including Gode, which was captured by units commanded by Colonel Abdullahi Ahmed Irro. The attacking forces did suffer some early setbacks; Ethiopian defenders at Dire Dawa and Jijiga inflicted heavy casualties on assaulting forces. This in turn prompted the U.S. to later start supporting Somalia. The war ended when Somali forces retreated back across the border and a truce was declared.

=== Ethiopian Civil War ===
In the 27 May to June 13, 1991, the Djiboutian Armed Forces and FFDJ participated in Operation Godoria. The President of the Djiboutian Republic, Hassan Gouled Aptidon described this as a "invasion". At the end of May 1991, during the collapse of the Ethiopian regime the Assab loyalist division, 9,000 strong, crossed the Djiboutian-Ethiopian border with arms and luggage and headed towards Obock. Simultaneously, another division crossed the Western border and moved towards Dikhil. This violation of the borders by a regular foreign army fell firmly within the framework of the treaty between France and Djibouti. On May 26 at 10:30 p.m., Operation Godoria was launched, and all Djiboutian and French forces, whether land, air and sea, stationed in Djibouti participated in it. The Djiboutian Army prevented the Ethiopian troops from advancing towards the south. Faced with Djiboutian and French troops deployed afainst them, the Ethiopian officers yielded to the demands and agreed to continue the disarmament previously begun. The 5th Overseas Interarms Regiment took charge of a detachment of 4,300 military refugees, accompanied by a few families and embarked in 120 vehicles of all types heading towards the southern border. The initial aim was to clean up a border area of 150 km2, collect, remove supplies, inventory and hand over abandoned weapons to the Djiboutian authorities. The "Lynx Mike" detachment identified thousands of individual and collective weapons, including the T 55, ZU-23-2, BTR and BRDM, finally destroyed 50 tons of unpackaged ammunition of all calibers. From May 30 to June 13, a total of 12,500 weapons from the AK47 to the T64, including LRMs, 122 howitzers and more than 200 tons of ammunition from the 200 kg bomb to the cartridge factory, via rockets LRM was moved, sorted, stored, and some neutralized or destroyed. For the first time since the independence of Djibouti, the Djiboutian national army and the French forces placed in a highly operational environment, will have proved the validity of the defense agreements binding the two countries contributed to the success of this mission to safeguard the Republic of Djibouti. Perfectly impregnated with the spirit of the mission, the porpoises, from the colonel to the simple soldier, knew how to demand from this Ethiopian army, demoralized, but still supervised, the strict application of the orders emanating from the civil and military authorities, Djiboutian and French, in starting with disarmament before providing them with the food support that has become essential. Around 10:00 am, the convoy begins its progress in the direction of Ali Sabieh. Then reached Ali Sabieh where the refugees were taken care of by the Djiboutian Army and the High Commissioner for Refugees. Most will reach the region of Dire Dawa, in eastern Ethiopia.

=== Djiboutian–Eritrean border conflict ===
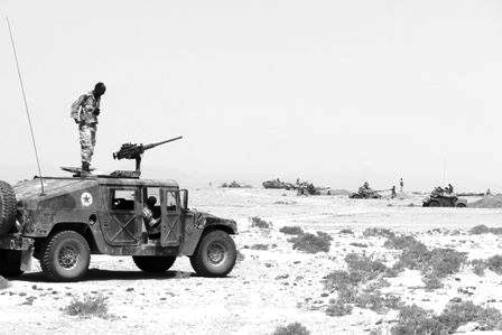
Djiboutian troops with light armoured cars near the border of Eritrea

It was triggered by tension which began on April 16, 2008 when Djibouti reported that Eritrean armed forces had penetrated into Djiboutian territory and dug trenches on both sides of the border. The first fighting for a decade between the Horn of Africa neighbors, two of the continent's smallest states, stopped late on Wednesday. Troops from both sides had exchanged fire since Tuesday along a part of their frontier that overlooks strategic shipping lanes in the Red Sea. Clashes on the Djibouti-Eritrea frontier broke out in the Ras Doumeira area, which straddles the Bab al-Mandib straits. Experts say the only undecided area of the border is the tiny Doumeira Islands, next to a village of the same name. Djibouti has fought in clashes against Eritrea over the Ras Doumeira peninsula, which both countries claim to be under their sovereignty. The first clash occurred in 1996 after a nearly two-months stand-off. In 1999, a political crisis occurred when both sides accused each other for supporting its enemies. In 2008, the countries clashed again when Djibouti refused to return Eritrean deserters and Eritrea responded by firing at the Djiboutian forces. In the following battles, some 44 Djiboutian troops and some estimated 100 Eritreans were killed.
