= Djiboutian art =

Djiboutian art is the artistic culture of Djibouti. It includes parts of the Somali and Afar cultures. A lot of Djibouti original art is passed on orally, mainly through song. The oldest evidence of art in Balho are pre-historic rock paintings. Many examples of Islamic, Ottoman, and French influences can be noted in the local buildings, which contain plaster work, motifs and calligraphy.
