= Telecommunications in Djibouti =

Telecommunications in Djibouti falls under the authority of the Ministry of Communication & Culture.

== Communications ==
=== Telephones ===
- Main lines in use: 23,000 (2015)
- Mobile/cellular: 312,000 (2015)

==== Telephone system ====
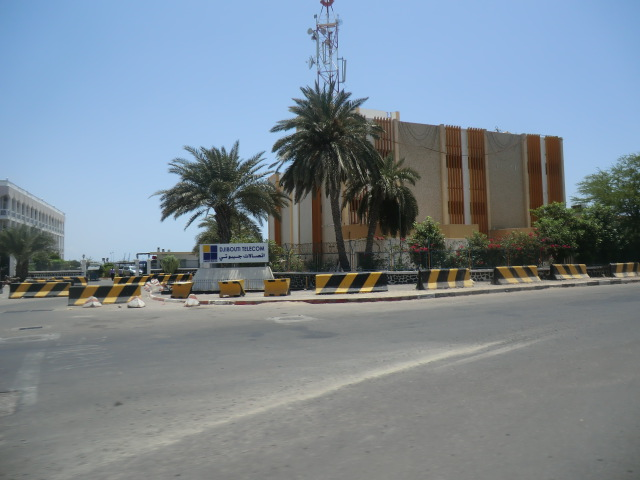
The Djibouti Telecom headquarters in Djibouti City.

General assessment: Telephone facilities in the city of Djibouti are defined by CIA World Factbook as "adequate as are the microwave radio relay connections to outlying areas of the country."

- Domestic: Djibouti Telecom is the sole provider of telecommunications services and utilizes mostly a microwave radio relay network; fiber-optic cable is installed in the capital; rural areas connected via wireless local loop radio systems; mobile cellular coverage is primarily limited to the area in and around Djibouti city
- International: country code - 253
- SEA-ME-WE 3 submarine cable to Jeddah, Suez, Sicily, Marseille, Colombo, and Singapore
- satellite earth stations - 1 Intelsat (Indian Ocean) and 1 Arabsat
- Medarabtel regional microwave radio relay telephone network

=== Radio ===
Radio broadcast stations: AM 1, FM 2, shortwave 0 (2001)

=== Television ===
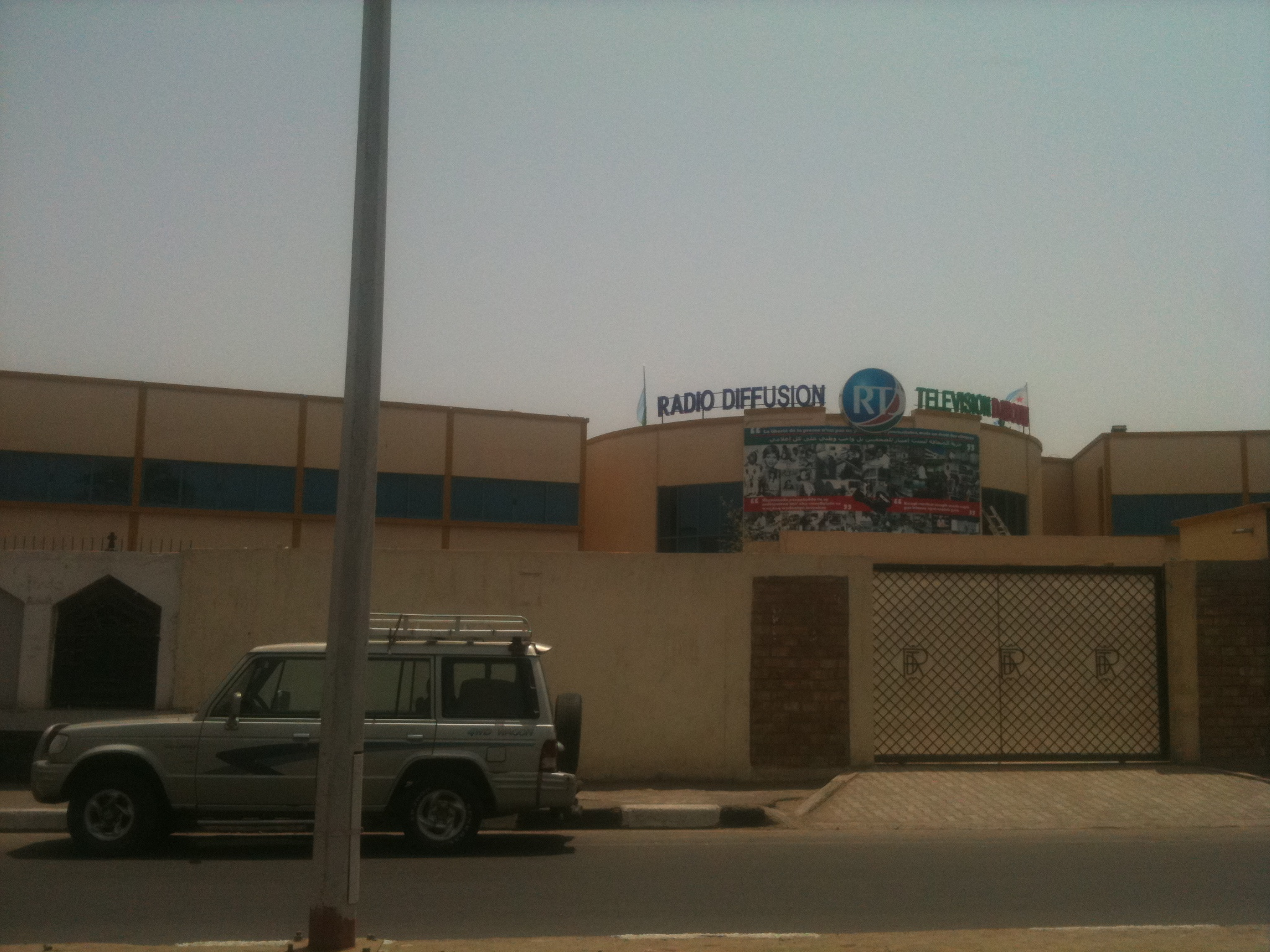
Radio Television of Djibouti headquarters in Djibouti City.

Television broadcast stations: 1 (2002); Radio Television of Djibouti

==== Broadcast media ====
Maintains restrictions on the licensing and operation of broadcast media; state-owned Radiodiffusion-Television de Djibouti (RTD) operates the sole terrestrial TV station as well as the only 2 domestic radio networks; no private TV or radio stations; transmissions of several international broadcasters are available (2007)

=== Internet ===
Internet hosts: 215 (2012)

- Internet country code: .dj

==== Internet users ====
38,866 (2020)
