= Geography of Djibouti =

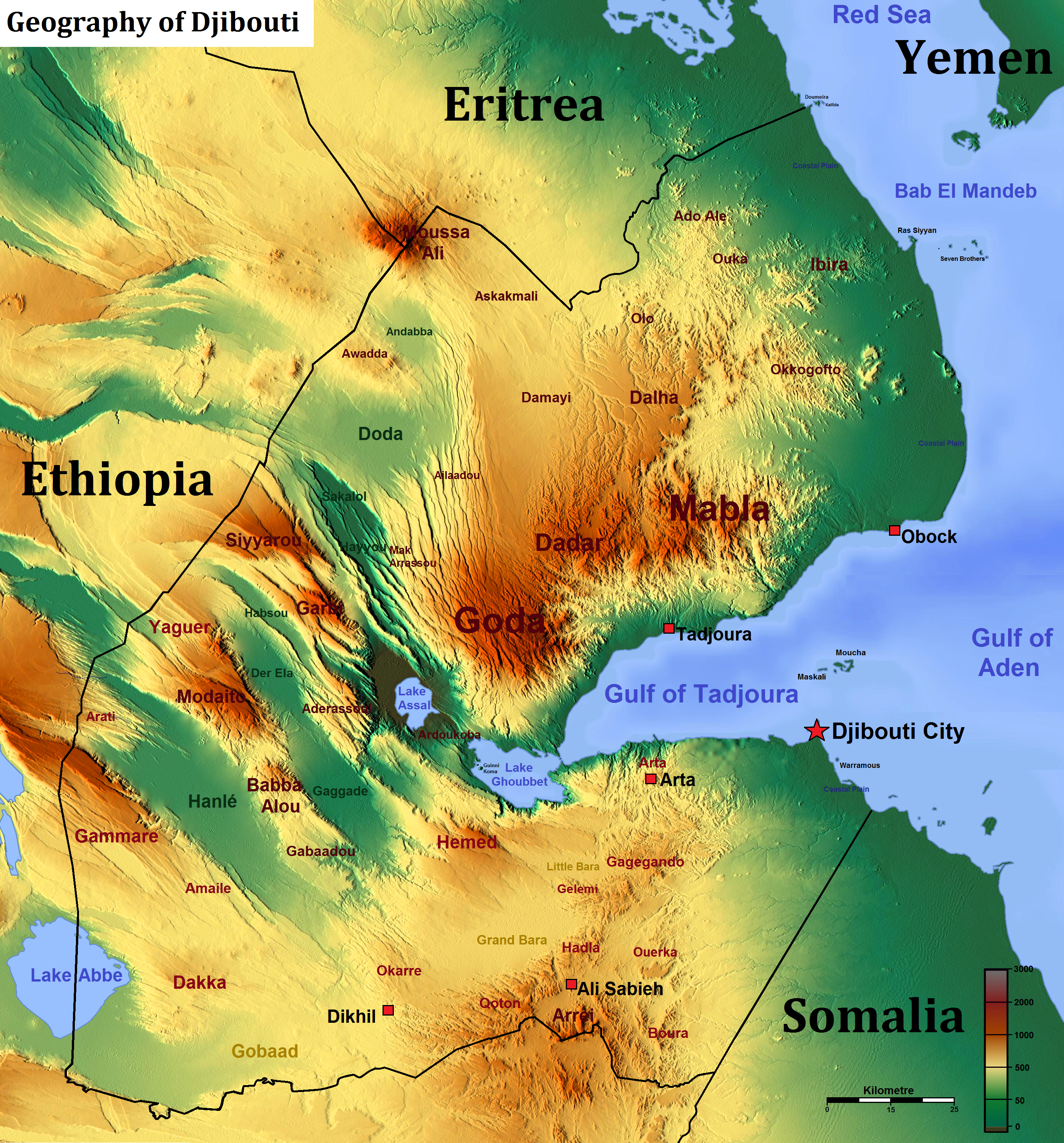
- Continent: Africa
- Region: Horn of Africa
- Area: Ranked 146th
  - Total: 23,200 km^{2} (9,000 sq mi)
- Coastline: 314 km (195 mi)
- Borders: 575 km (357 mi) * Ethiopia: 390 km (242 mi) * Eritrea: 125 km (78 mi) * Somalia: 60 km (37 mi) * Yemen: (maritime boundary, Bab el Mandeb)
- Highest point: Mousa Ali; 2,028 m (6,654 ft)
- Lowest point: Lac Assal −155 m (−509 ft)
- Largest lake: Lake Abbe
- Terrain: Mostly mountainous and volcanic

Djibouti is a country in the Horn of Africa. It is bordered by Eritrea in the north, Ethiopia in the west and south, and Somalia in the southeast. To the east is its coastline on the Red Sea and the Gulf of Aden. Rainfall is sparse, and most of the territory has a semi-arid to arid environment. Lake Assal is a saline lake which lies 155 m (509 ft) below sea level, making it the lowest point on land in Africa and the third-lowest point on Earth after the Sea of Galilee and the Dead Sea. Djibouti has the fifth smallest population in Africa. Djibouti's major settlements include the capital Djibouti City, the port towns of Tadjoura and Obock, and the southern cities of Ali Sabieh and Dikhil. It is the forty-sixth country by area in Africa and 147st largest country in the world by land area, covering a total of 23,200 km^{2} (9,000 sq mi), of which 23,180 km^{2} (8,950 sq mi) is land and 20 km^{2} (7.7 sq mi) is water.

== Location ==
Djibouti shares 125 kilometres (78 mi) of border with Eritrea, 390 kilometres (240 mi) with Ethiopia, and 60 kilometres (37 mi) with Somalia (total 575 km or 357 mi). It has a strategic location on the Horn of Africa and the Bab el Mandeb, along a route through the Red Sea and Suez Canal. Djibouti's coastline serves as a commercial gateway between the Arabian Peninsula and the Horn region's interior. The country is also the terminus of rail traffic into Ethiopia.

== Physiographic regions ==
Djibouti can be divided into three physiographic regions

1. The Northern Mountains
2. Grand Bara
3. The Southern Mountains

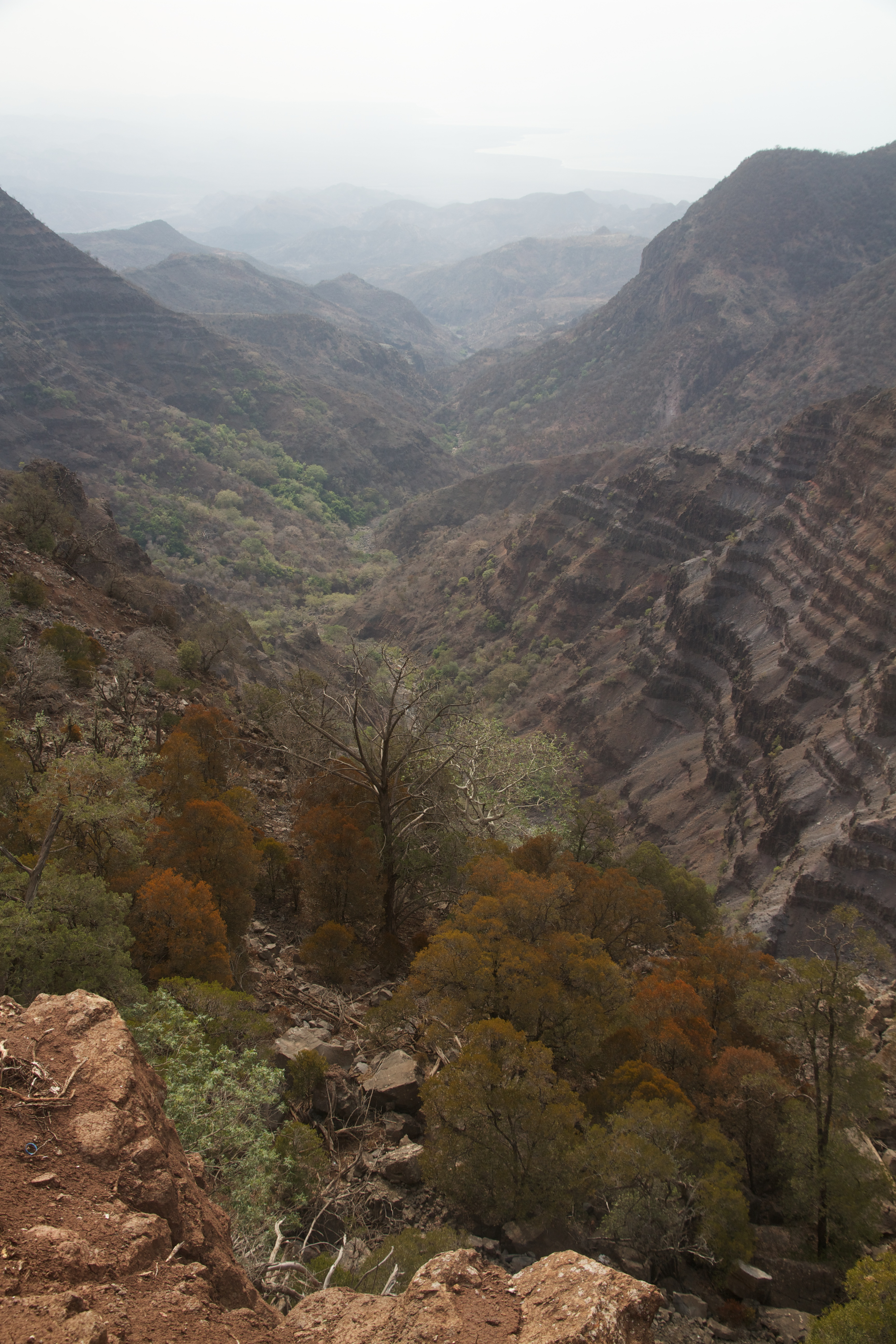
The Goda Mountains

=== Mountains ===
A great arc of mountains, consisting of the Mousa Ali, Goda Mountains, and Arrei Mountains surrounds Djibouti.

Djibouti has eight mountain ranges with peaks of over 1,000 m (3,300 ft).

- The Mousa Ali range is considered the country's highest mountain range, with the tallest peak on the border with Ethiopia and Eritrea. It has an elevation of 2,063 m.
- The Goda Mountains lie northwest of the Gulf of Tadjoura in Tadjoura Region. They rise to 1,783 m (5,850 ft) above sea level and are the nation's largest heavily vegetated area.
- Garbi is a mountain in the west of Tadjourah Region. It has an elevation of 1,680 metres (5,510 feet).
- The Mabla Mountains are located in Obock Region. At 1,780 m (5,840 ft) above sea level, the mountains are situated behind the coastal plain where the Red Sea meets the Gulf of Aden, on the northern side of the Gulf of Tadjoura.
- The Arrei Mountains are in the southern Ali Sabieh Region. The mountain range has an elevation of 1,301 metres (4,268 feet) above sea level, and is situated near the border with Ethiopia.
- The Dagouein Mountain sit at an elevation of 1,124 m (3,688 ft) above sea level.
- Hemed is a mountain in the western part of the Arta Region in south-central Djibouti. The summit is 1,103 metres (3,619 feet) above sea level.
- The Boura Mountains' highest peak has an elevation of 1,003 m (3,291 ft). The ecology of this landform is semi-desert. The altitude and size of the range affects its weather, with precipitation levels varying greatly and climatic conditions consisting of distinct zones.

=== Grand Bara ===
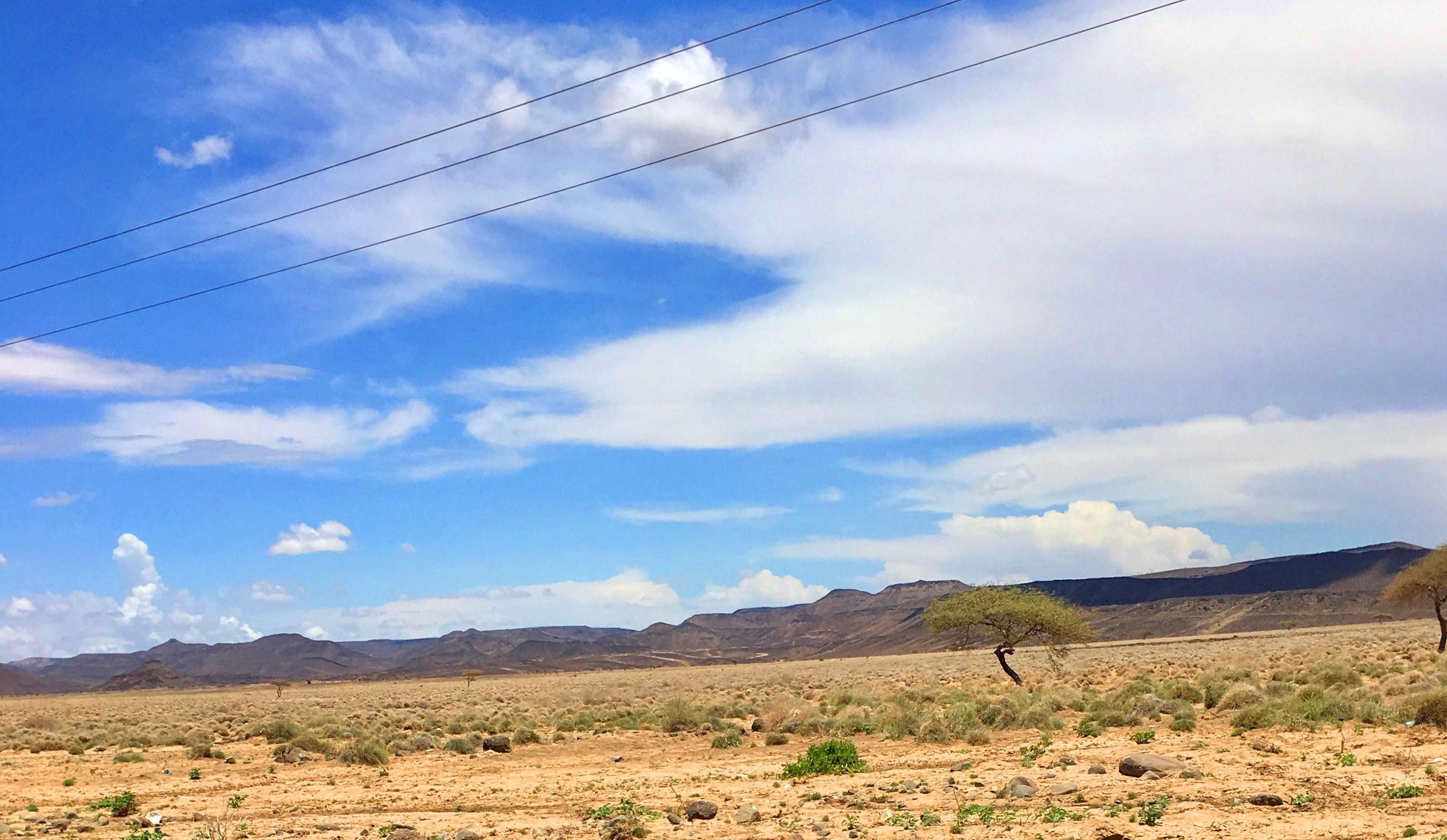
The Grand Bara Desert

The Grand Bara Desert covers parts of southern Djibouti in the Arta Region, Ali Sabieh Region and Dikhil Region. The majority of the Grand Bara Desert lies at a relatively low elevation, below 1,700 feet (520 m). Home of the popular Grand Bara footrace.

=== Coasts ===
Most of Djibouti has been described as part of the Ethiopian xeric grasslands and shrublands ecoregion. The exception is a strip along the Red Sea coast, which is part of the Eritrean coastal desert; it is noted as an important migration route for birds of prey.

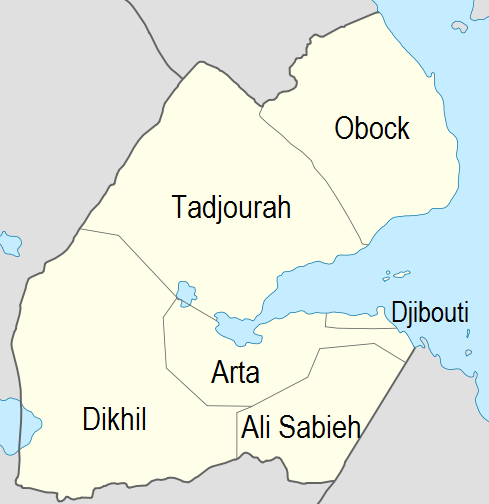
Map of the regions of Djibouti.

== Regions ==
The area of the regions of Djibouti is set out in the table below.

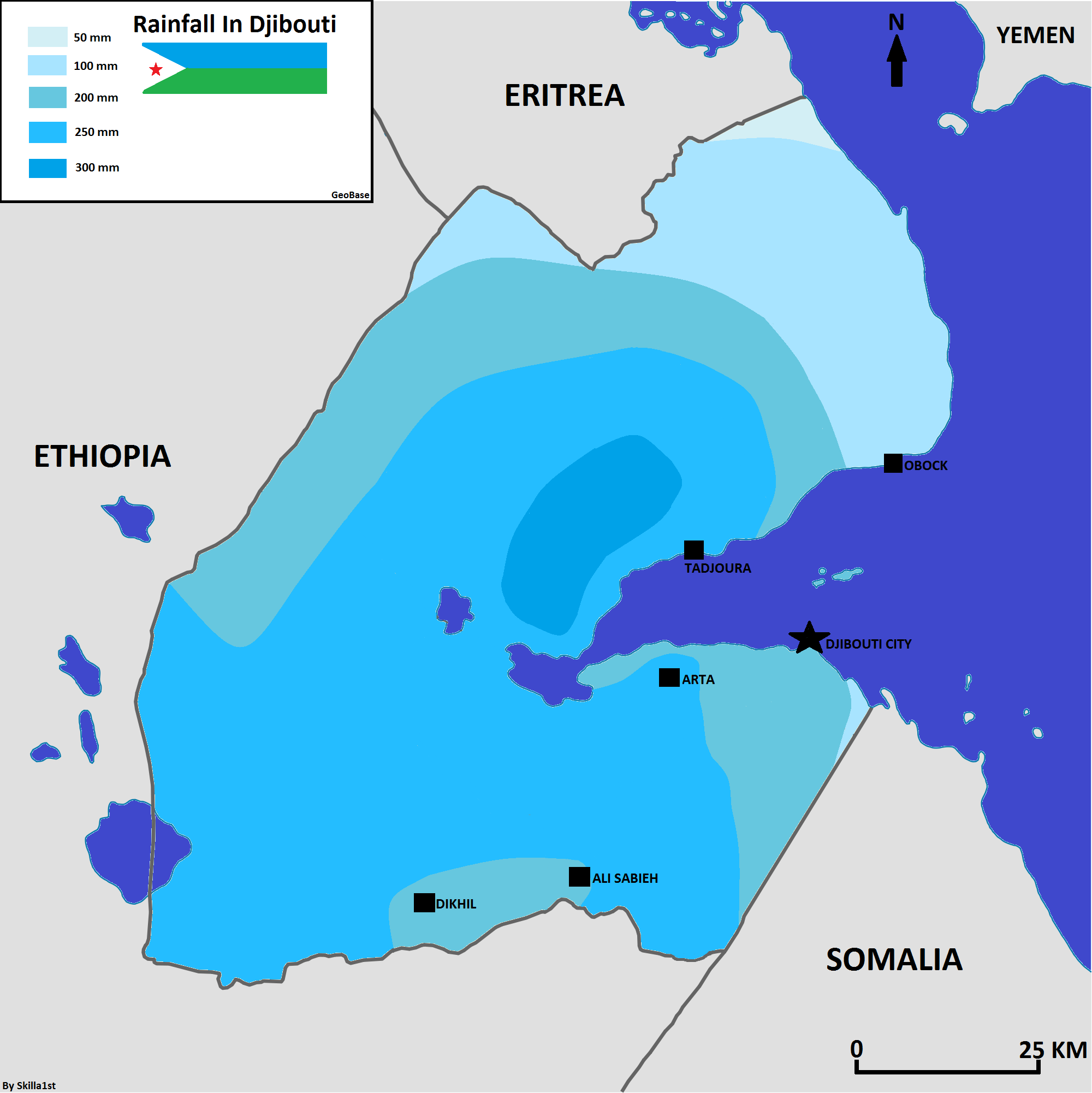
The rainfall of Djibouti

Rank	Name	Area
1	Dikhil Region	7,200 km^{2}
2	Tadjourah Region	7,100 km^{2}
3	Obock Region	4,700 km^{2}
4	Ali Sabieh Region	2,200 km^{2}
5	Arta Region	1,800 km^{2}
6	Djibouti Region	200 km^{2}

== Climate ==
There is not much seasonal variation in Djibouti's climate. Hot conditions prevail year-round along with winter rainfall. Mean daily maximum temperatures range from 32 to 41 °C (90 to 106 °F), except at high elevations. In Djibouti City, for instance, afternoon highs in April typically range from 28 to 34 °C (82 to 93 °F) in April. Nationally, mean daily minima generally vary between sites from about 15 to 30 °C (59 to 86 °F). The greatest range in climate occurs in eastern Djibouti, where temperatures sometimes surpass 41 °C (106 °F) in July on the littoral plains and fall below freezing point during December in the highlands. In this region, relative humidity ranges from about 40% in the mid-afternoon to 85% at night, changing somewhat according to the season.

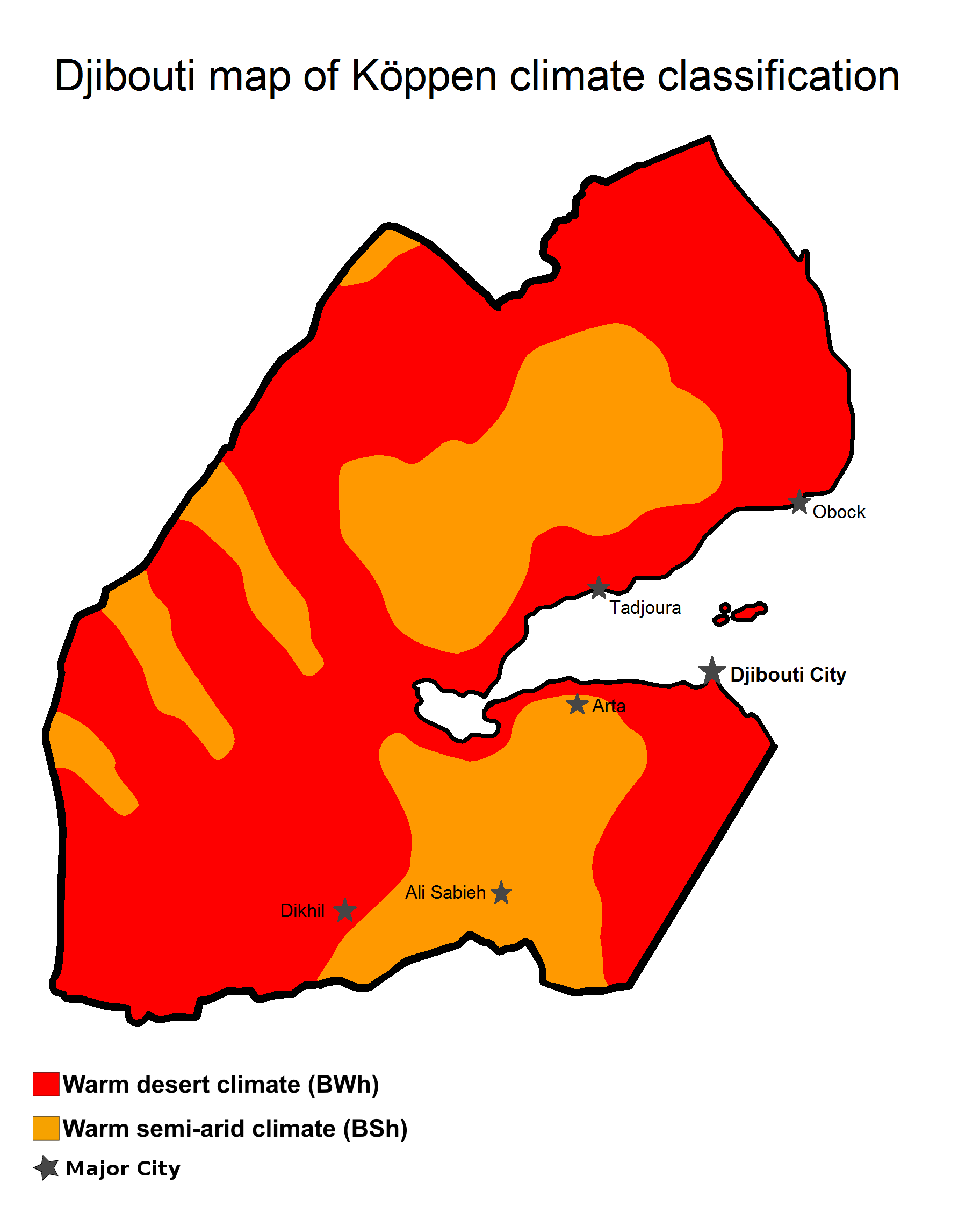
Köppen climate types of Djibouti

Djibouti has 988,000 people living there. Djibouti has either a hot semi-arid climate (BSh) or a hot desert climate (BWh), although temperatures are much moderated at the high elevations. On the coastal seaboard, annual rainfall is less than 5 inches (130 mm); in the highlands, it is about 8 to 16 inches (200 to 410 millimetres). Although the coastal regions are hot and humid throughout the year, the hinterland is typically hot and dry. The climate conditions are highly variable within the country and vary locally by altitude. Summers are very humid along the coast but dry in the highlands. Heat waves are frequent. Annual precipitation amounts vary greatly from one year to another. In general, rain falls more frequently and extensively in the mountains. Sudden and brutal storms are also known to occur. Wadis turn for a few hours into raging torrents tearing everything in their path, and their course is regularized. Rainwater serves as an additional water supply for livestock and plants alongside seasonal watercourses. The highlands have temperate climate throughout the year. The climate of most lowland zones is arid and semiarid.

The climate of the interior shows notable differences from the coastline. Especially in the mornings, the temperature is pleasant: it is so in Arta, Randa and Day (where temperatures of 10 degrees Celsius have been recorded).

=== Climate charts of different locations in Djibouti ===
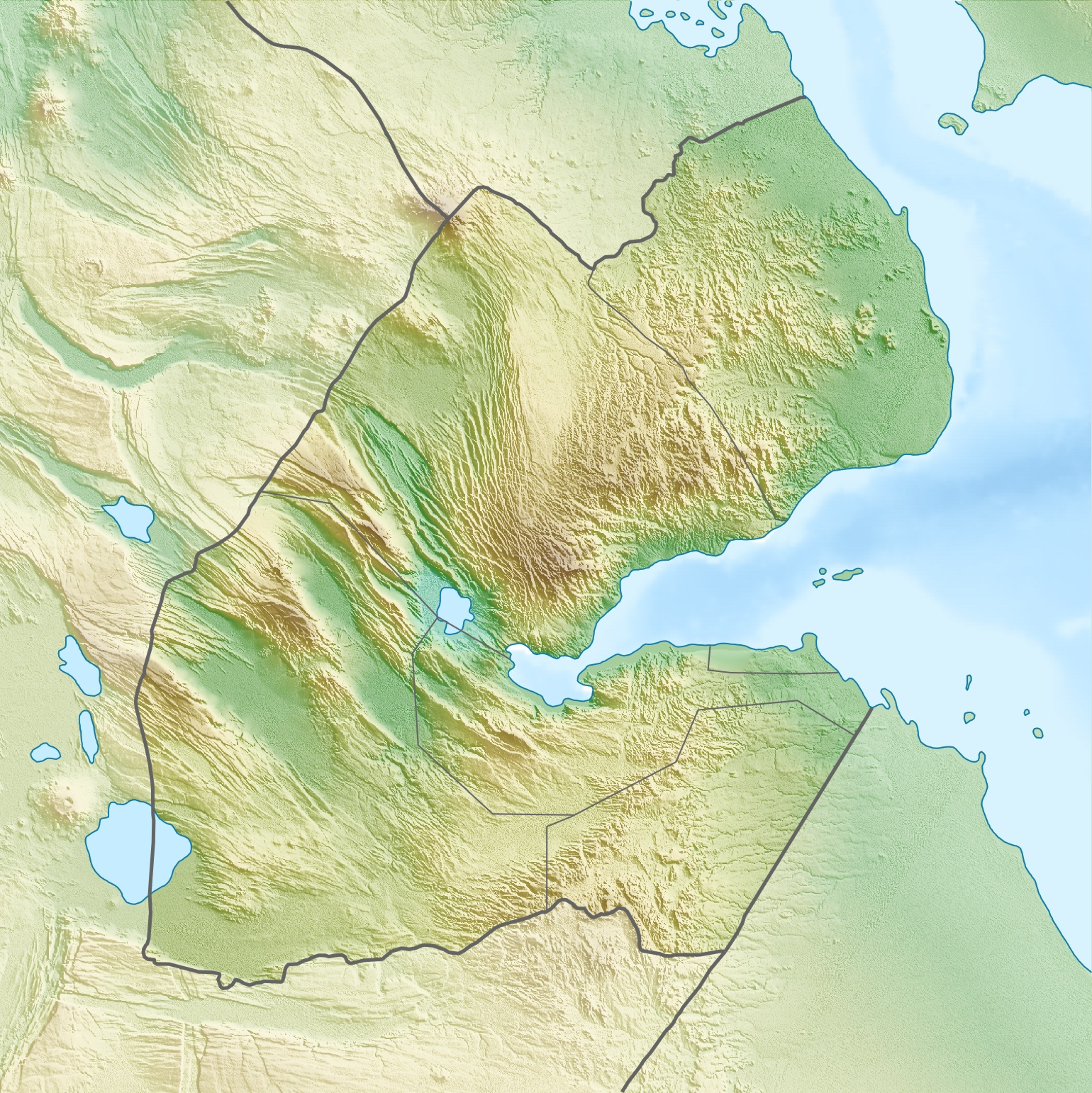

Djibouti City

Climate chart (precipitation, max. and min. temperature)
J	F	M	A	M	J	J	A	S	O	N	D
10 29 22	19 29 23	20 30 24	29 32 25	17 35 27	0.1 39 29	6.2 42 31	5.6 41 31	3.1 37 29	20 33 26	22 31 23	11 29 22
- █ Average max. and min. temperatures in °C
- █ Precipitation totals in mm
- Source: Deutscher Wetterdienst
Imperial conversion
J	F	M	A	M	J	J	A	S	O	N	D
0.4 84 71	0.7 84 73	0.8 86 75	1.1 90 78	0.7 95 81	0 102 85	0.2 107 88	0.2 106 87	0.1 99 84	0.8 92 78	0.9 87 74	0.4 85 71
- █ Average max. and min. temperatures in °F
- █ Precipitation totals in inches

Arta

Climate chart (precipitation, max. and min. temperature)
J	F	M	A	M	J	J	A	S	O	N	D
30 25 15	27 26 17	26 27 18	30 28 20	16 29 21	1 33 24	9 36 26	20 36 25	10 32 23	12 28 20	43 27 18	12 26 15
- █ Average max. and min. temperatures in °C
- █ Precipitation totals in mm
- Source: Levoyageur
Imperial conversion
J	F	M	A	M	J	J	A	S	O	N	D
1.2 77 59	1.1 79 62	1 80 65	1.2 83 68	0.6 85 71	0 92 75	0.4 97 78	0.8 96 77	0.4 89 74	0.5 82 68	1.7 80 64	0.5 79 60
- █ Average max. and min. temperatures in °F
- █ Precipitation totals in inches

Holhol

Climate chart (precipitation, max. and min. temperature)
J	F	M	A	M	J	J	A	S	O	N	D
5 26 17	9 27 18	25 29 20	37 31 21	14 35 23	7 39 26	11 39 28	35 36 28	29 34 26	13 30 22	7 28 19	6 27 17
- █ Average max. and min. temperatures in °C
- █ Precipitation totals in mm
- Source: Climate-Data
Imperial conversion
J	F	M	A	M	J	J	A	S	O	N	D
0.2 80 63	0.4 81 65	1 85 68	1.5 88 71	0.6 94 74	0.3 102 78	0.4 102 83	1.4 97 82	1.1 92 78	0.5 87 72	0.3 82 67	0.2 81 63
- █ Average max. and min. temperatures in °F
- █ Precipitation totals in inches

Ali Sabieh

Climate chart (precipitation, max. and min. temperature)
J	F	M	A	M	J	J	A	S	O	N	D
17 26 15	14 27 17	15 27 18	21 28 20	5 29 21	2 33 24	19 36 25	43 36 25	34 32 23	10 28 20	13 27 18	7 26 15
- █ Average max. and min. temperatures in °C
- █ Precipitation totals in mm
- Source: Climate-Data
Imperial conversion
J	F	M	A	M	J	J	A	S	O	N	D
0.7 79 59	0.6 80 62	0.6 81 65	0.8 82 68	0.2 85 71	0.1 92 75	0.7 97 77	1.7 96 77	1.3 89 74	0.4 82 68	0.5 80 64	0.3 79 60
- █ Average max. and min. temperatures in °F
- █ Precipitation totals in inches

Dikhil

Climate chart (precipitation, max. and min. temperature)
J	F	M	A	M	J	J	A	S	O	N	D
7 27 17	8 27 19	10 28 20	28 28 22	9 31 23	3 36 26	29 38 28	41 38 27	38 34 26	8 29 22	6 28 19	2 28 18
- █ Average max. and min. temperatures in °C
- █ Precipitation totals in mm
- Source: Climate-Data
Imperial conversion
J	F	M	A	M	J	J	A	S	O	N	D
0.3 81 63	0.3 81 66	0.4 82 68	1.1 83 71	0.4 88 74	0.1 96 78	1.1 101 82	1.6 100 81	1.5 93 78	0.3 85 72	0.2 83 67	0.1 82 64
- █ Average max. and min. temperatures in °F
- █ Precipitation totals in inches

Airolaf

Climate chart (precipitation, max. and min. temperature)
J	F	M	A	M	J	J	A	S	O	N	D
34 24 9	37 24 10	33 25 12	45 26 13	24 27 15	13 30 17	49 31 19	70 31 18	56 29 17	16 27 13	32 25 11	22 24 9
- █ Average max. and min. temperatures in °C
- █ Precipitation totals in mm
- Source: Climate-Data
Imperial conversion
J	F	M	A	M	J	J	A	S	O	N	D
1.3 75 49	1.5 76 51	1.3 77 53	1.8 79 56	0.9 81 59	0.5 86 63	1.9 88 66	2.8 87 65	2.2 85 62	0.6 80 56	1.3 78 52	0.9 75 49
- █ Average max. and min. temperatures in °F
- █ Precipitation totals in inches

Alaili Dadda

Climate chart (precipitation, max. and min. temperature)
J	F	M	A	M	J	J	A	S	O	N	D
10 28 20	11 28 20	13 30 22	11 32 23	6 35 26	2 37 28	13 38 28	19 37 27	17 36 27	7 33 24	14 30 22	12 28 21
- █ Average max. and min. temperatures in °C
- █ Precipitation totals in mm
- Source: Climate-Data
Imperial conversion
J	F	M	A	M	J	J	A	S	O	N	D
0.4 82 67	0.4 82 69	0.5 85 71	0.4 89 74	0.2 94 78	0.1 99 83	0.5 101 82	0.7 99 81	0.7 96 81	0.3 91 75	0.6 86 71	0.5 82 70
- █ Average max. and min. temperatures in °F
- █ Precipitation totals in inches

Yoboki

Climate chart (precipitation, max. and min. temperature)
J	F	M	A	M	J	J	A	S	O	N	D
6 30 21	6 30 22	3 32 24	10 34 25	4 38 28	3 40 30	45 40 28	55 39 28	26 38 29	2 35 25	4 32 22	4 30 21
- █ Average max. and min. temperatures in °C
- █ Precipitation totals in mm
- Source: Climate-Data
Imperial conversion
J	F	M	A	M	J	J	A	S	O	N	D
0.2 86 69	0.2 86 72	0.1 90 74	0.4 94 77	0.2 100 82	0.1 105 86	1.8 105 83	2.2 103 82	1 100 84	0.1 94 77	0.2 89 72	0.2 86 70
- █ Average max. and min. temperatures in °F
- █ Precipitation totals in inches

Graphically the seasons can be represented this way:

Month	Dec	Jan	Feb	Mar	Apr	May	Jun	Jul	Aug	Sep	Oct	Nov
Season	Winter|Jilaal					Summer/Hagaa				Winter|Jilaal		
Temperature	Cool				Very Hot						Cool	

== Selected elevations of notable locations ==
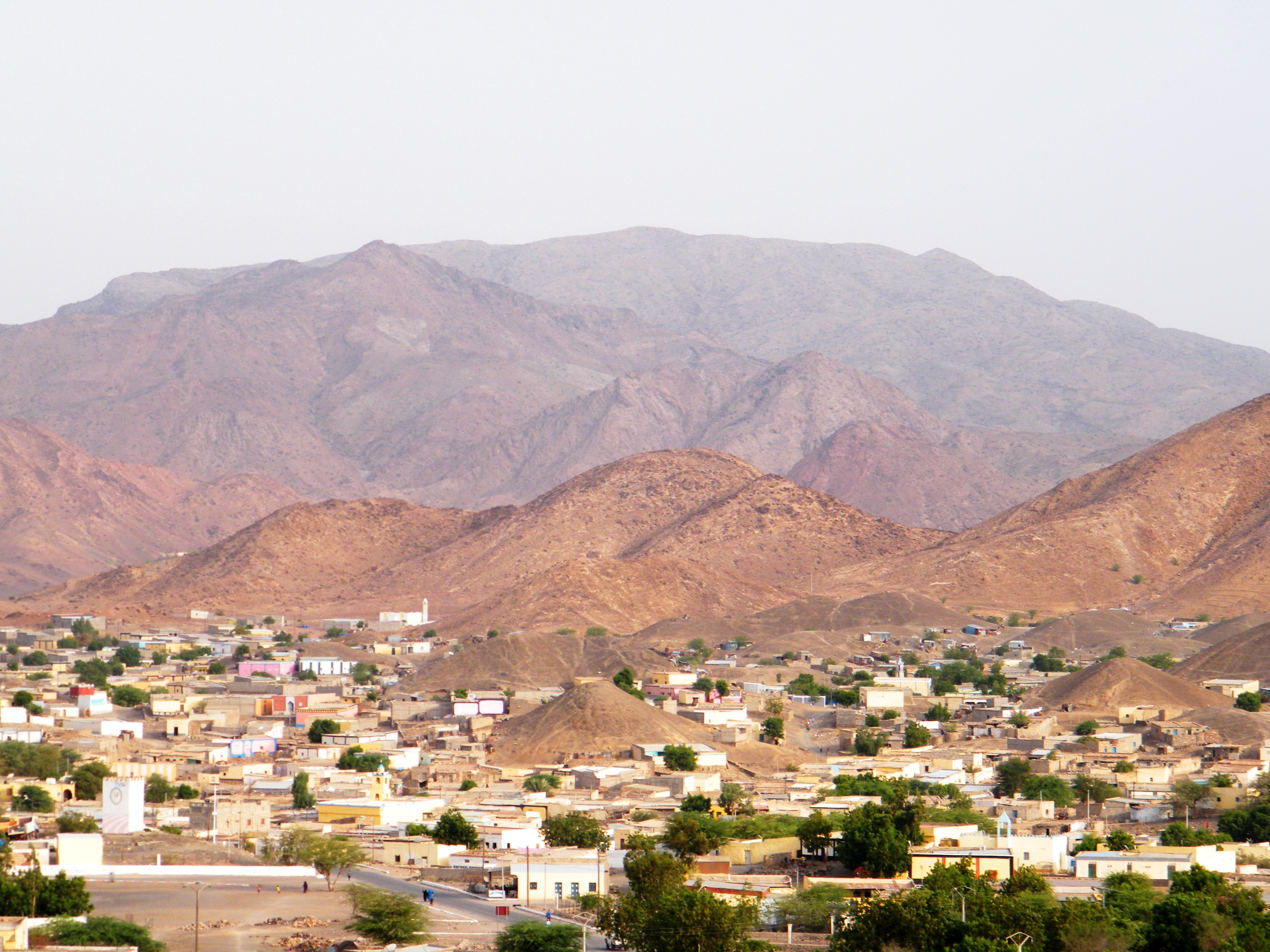
The Arrei Mountains as seen from Ali Sabieh.

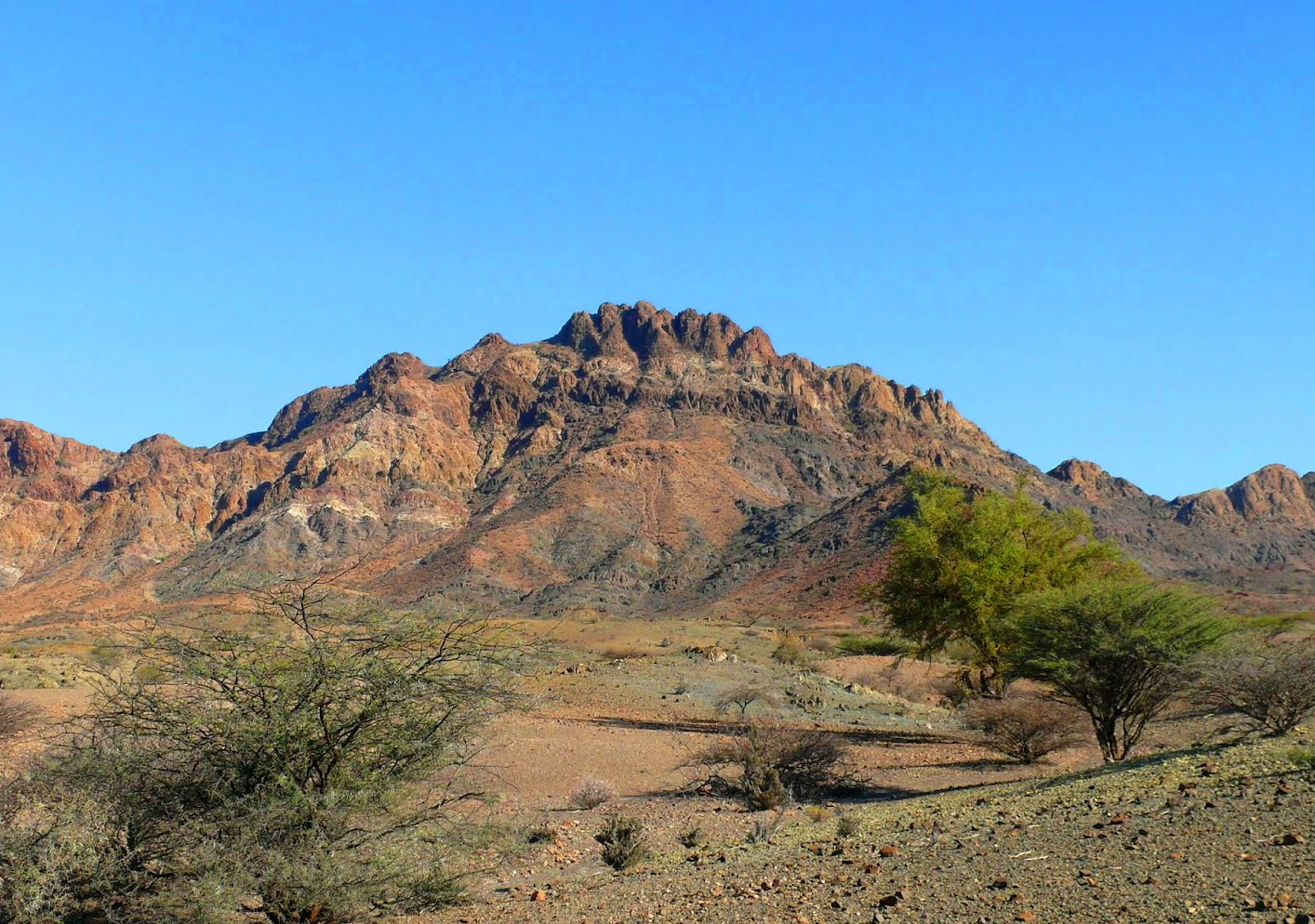
The Southern part of the Boura Mountains.

Location	Region	Elevation (feet)	Elevation (metres)
Mousa Ali	Tadjourah	6,631 ft	2,028 m
Goda Mountains	Tadjourah	5,840 ft	1,780 m
Garbi	Tadjourah	5,512 ft	1,680 m
Yaguer	Dikhil	4,524 ft	1,379 m
Mabla Mountains	Obock	4,511 ft	1,375 m
Arrei Mountains	Ali Sabieh	4,268 ft	1,301 m
Dagouein Mountain	Ali Sabieh	3,688 ft	1,124 m
Hemed	Arta	3,619 ft	1,103 m
Boura Mountains	Ali Sabieh	3,291 ft	1,003 m
Arta Mountains	Arta	2,477 ft	755 m
Lake Assal	Tadjourah	– 509 ft	– 155 m

Lake Assal is the lowest point in Africa.

== Resources and land use ==
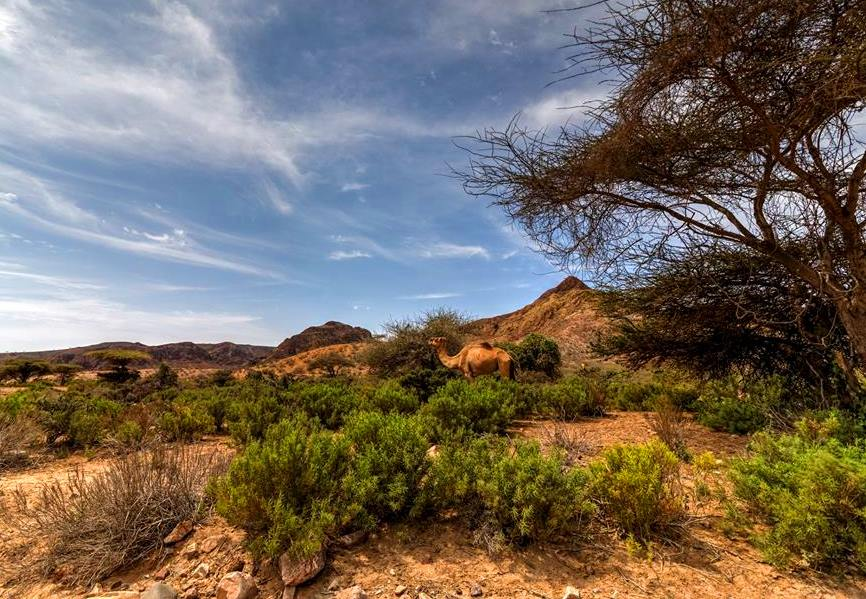
Grazing camel in Ali Sabieh Region.

Land use: arable land: 0.1%
permanent pasture: 73.3%
forest: 0.2%
other: 26.4% (2011)

Irrigated land: 10 km^{2} (3.86 sq mi) (2012)

=== Water in Djibouti ===
Water is becoming a scarce resource in Djibouti due to climate change, which leads to different rainfall patterns as well as to inefficient methods of distribution within the country. Most of Djibouti's rainfall is in the four months, but over the last 25 years, the Djibouti's Ministry of Environment estimates that rainfall has decreased overall between 5 and 20 percent. It is predicted that in future years, there will be higher temperatures, lower rainfall, and longer droughts, leading to even less access to water. Moreover, seawater intrusion or fossil saltwater contamination of the limited freshwater aquifers due to groundwater overexploitation affect those who live close to the coastline.

In recent years, population growth has increased rapidly with the addition of many refugees.

=== Natural resources ===
Unlike much of the Horn of Africa and Middle East which is rich in lucrative crude oil, Djibouti has limited natural resources. These include potential geothermal power, gold, clay, granite, limestone, marble, salt, diatomite, gypsum, pumice, petroleum.

== Environment ==
Natural hazards include earthquakes, drought, and occasional cyclonic disturbances from the Indian Ocean, which bring heavy rains, and flash floods. Natural resources include geothermal energy. Inadequate supplies of potable water, limited arable land and desertification are current issues.

Djibouti is a party to international agreements on biodiversity, climate change, desertification, endangered species, Law of the Sea, ozone layer protection, ship pollution, and wetlands.

== Coastline ==
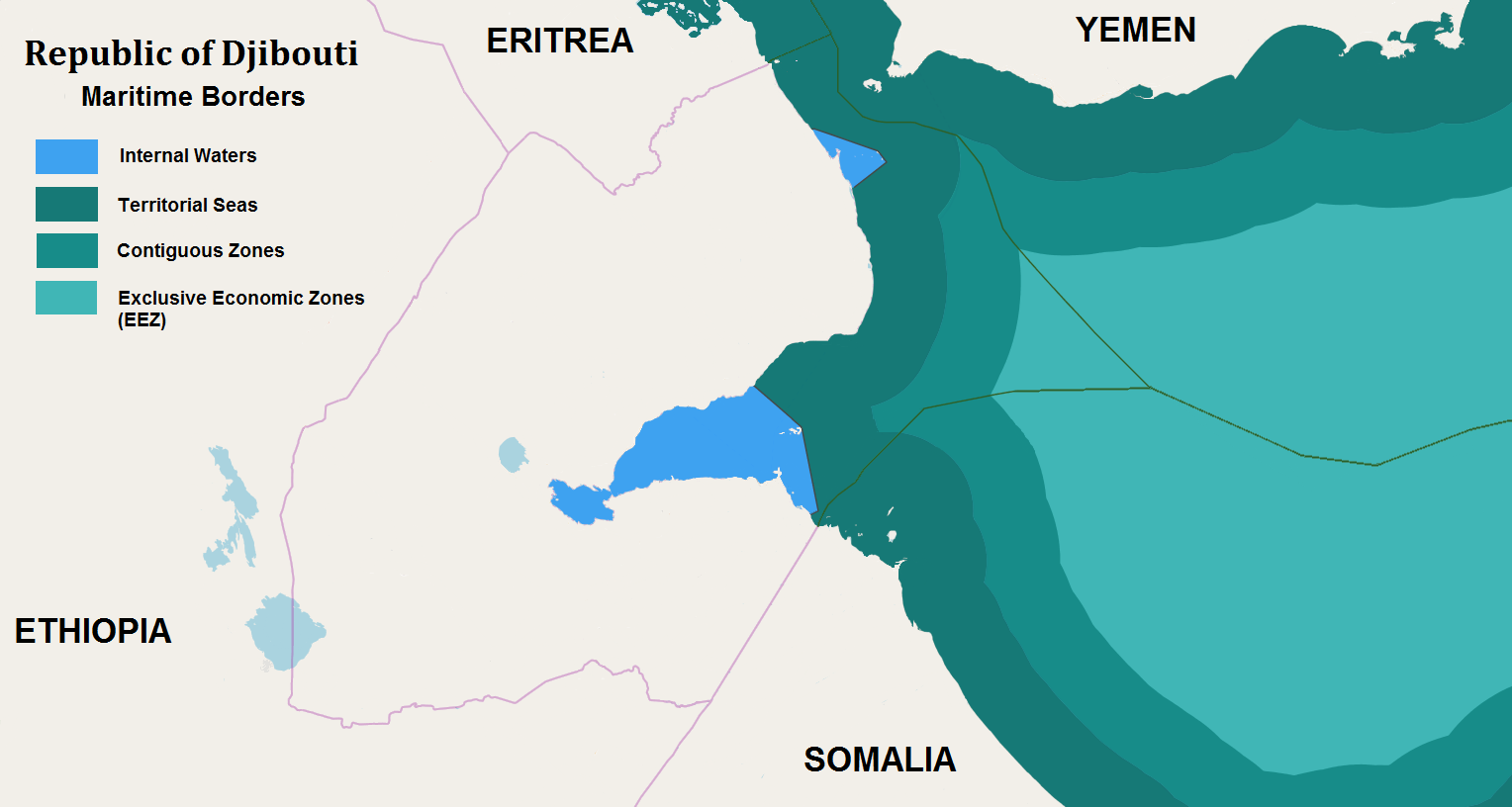
The Republic of Djibouti Maritime Borders.

Djibouti has a coastline which measures about 314 kilometres (195 miles). Much of the coastline is accessible and quite varied in geography and habitats.

=== Inlets ===
- Gulf of Tadjoura
- Ghoubbet-el-Kharab

=== Maritime claims ===
- Territorial sea: 12 nautical miles (22.2 km; 13.8 mi)
- Contiguous zone: 24 nautical miles (44.4 km; 27.6 mi)
- Exclusive economic zone: 200 nautical miles (370.4 km; 230.2 mi)

== Human geography ==
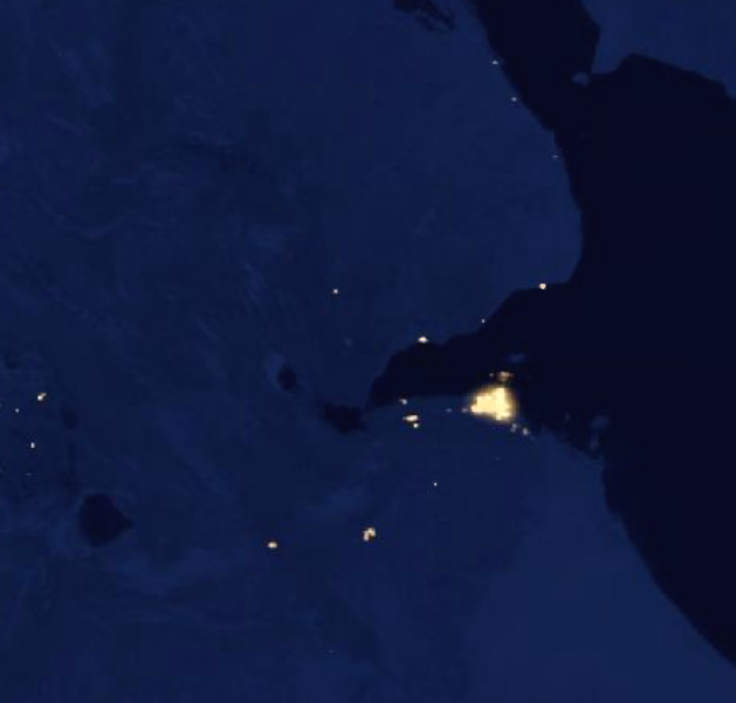
Satellite images of Djibouti during the night.

The population of Djibouti in 2015 was 846,000.

For statistical purposes, the country has three areas; Djibouti City (population 529,000), Ali Sabieh (population 55,000), and Dikhil (population 54,000). Djibouti's population is diverse demographically; 60% Somali, 35% Afar, and 3% Arabs. In terms of religion, 94% Muslim, 6% Christian.

== Extreme points ==
This is a list of the extreme points of Djibouti, the points that are farther north, south, east or west than any other location.

- Northernmost point – Ras Doumera, Obock Region
- Northernmost point (mainland) – the point at which the border with Eritrea enters the Red Sea, Obock Region
- Easternmost point – unnamed section of the Red Sea coast north of Ras Bir, Obock Region
- Southernmost point – unnamed location on the border with Ethiopia west of the town of As Ela, Dikhil Region
- Westernmost point – unnamed location on the border with Ethiopia immediately east of the Ethiopian town of Afambo, Dikhil Region
