= List of highways numbered 4 =

Route 4, or Highway 4, may refer to several highways in the following countries:

== International ==
- AH4 Asian Highway 4
- E04 European route E04
- E004 European route E004
- Cairo – Cape Town Highway

== Albania ==
- SH-4 road in Albania from Durrës to Kakavijë passing through Lushnjë, Fier, Ballsh, Tepelenë and Gjirokastër.

== Australia ==
=== New South Wales ===
- M4 Western Motorway (Sydney)
- Western Distributor (Sydney)

=== Northern Territory ===
- Lasseter Highway, NT
  - Tjukaruru Road
  - Great Central Road

=== Queensland ===
- Port of Brisbane Motorway
- Capricorn Highway
- Scenic Highway, Queensland

=== Tasmania ===
- Esk Highway, Tasmania

=== Victoria ===
- West Gate Tunnel Motorway (Melbourne)

=== Western Australia ===
- State Route 4 (Western Australia) – Tonkin Highway

== Austria ==
- Ost Autobahn

== Belgium ==
- R4 road (Belgium)

== Bolivia ==
- National Route 4 (Bolivia)

== Bulgaria ==
- A4 motorway (Bulgaria)
- I-4 road (Bulgaria)

== Myanmar(Burma) ==
- National Highway 4 (Burma)

== Cambodia ==
- National Highway 4 (Cambodia)

== Canada ==
- Alberta Highway 4
- British Columbia Highway 4
- Manitoba Highway 4
- New Brunswick Route 4
- Northwest Territories Highway 4 (Ingraham Trail)
- Nova Scotia Trunk 4
- Ontario Highway 4
- Route 4 (Prince Edward Island)
- Quebec Route 4 (former)
- Saskatchewan Highway 4
- Yukon Highway 4

== China ==
- G4 Expressway
  - G4_{w} Expressway (G4's branch)

== Costa Rica ==
- National Route 4

== Cuba ==
- Autopista A4
  - Autopista A4–1
- Highway 6–4

== Czech Republic ==
- D4 Motorway
- I/4 Highway (in Czech)

== Djibouti ==
- RN-4 (Djibouti)

== Dominican Republic ==
- DR-4

== Finland ==
- Finnish national road 4
- Åland Islands Highway 4

== Germany ==
- Bundesautobahn 4

== Greece ==
- EO4 road

== Hong Kong ==
- Route 4 (Hong Kong)

== Hungary ==
- M4 motorway (Hungary)
- Main road 4 (Hungary)

== India ==
- National Highway 4 (India)
- National Highway 4 (India, old numbering)

== Indonesia ==
- Indonesian National Route 4

== Iraq ==
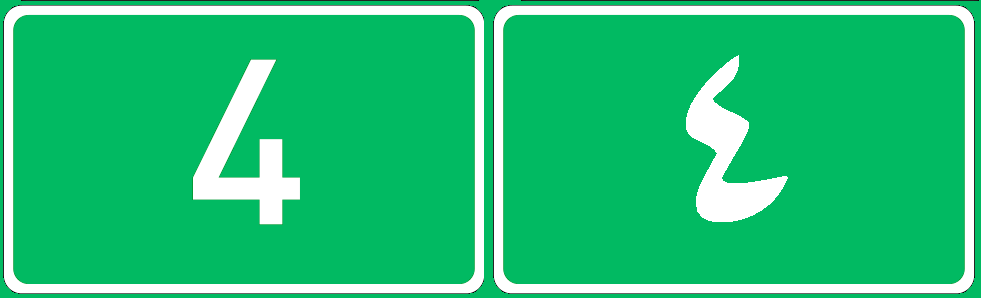
- Highway 4 (Iraq)

== Ireland ==
- M4 motorway (Republic of Ireland)
- N4 road (Ireland)

== Israel ==
- Highway 4 (Israel)

== Italy ==
- Autostrada A4
- RA 4
- State road 4
- T4

== Japan ==
- National Route 4
- Tōhoku Expressway
  - Aomori Expressway (branch of the Tōhoku Expressway)
  - Daini-Michinoku Toll Road (branch of the Tōhoku Expressway)
  - Hachinohe Expressway (branch of the Tōhoku Expressway)
  - Kamikita Expressway (branch of the Tōhoku Expressway)
  - Michinoku Toll Road (branch of the Tōhoku Expressway)
  - Momoishi Toll Road (branch of the Tōhoku Expressway)
- Route 4 (Shuto Expressway)
- Route 4 (Nagoya Expressway)
- Bayshore Route (Port of Osaka-Kansai International Airport)

== Korea, South ==
- National Route 4

== Malaysia ==
- FT 4 Malaysia Federal Route 4
- A4 Jalan Kerian
- B4 Jalan Haji Sirat
- J4 Johor State Route J4

== Moldova ==
- M4 highway (Moldova)

== Netherlands ==
- Rijksweg 4

== New Zealand ==
- New Zealand State Highway 4

== Nicaragua ==
- Nicaraguan Highway 4

== Nigeria ==
- Nigeria Trunk Road A4

== Norway ==
- Norwegian National Road 4

== Paraguay ==
- National Route 4

== Philippines ==
- C-4 Circumferential Road 4
- R-4 Radial Road 4
- N4 highway (Philippines)
- E4 expressway (Philippines)

== Poland ==
- Motorway A4
- National road 4 (according to the official documents, national road 4 and motorway A4 are basically the same route)

== Romania ==
- Drumul Naţional 4
- A4 motorway (Romania)

== Russia ==
- M4 highway (Russia)

== South Africa ==
- M4 (Port Elizabeth)
- M4 road (Pretoria)
- M4 (Durban)
- N4 (South Africa)

== Taiwan ==
- National Highway 4 (Taiwan)
- Provincial Highway 4 (Taiwan)

== Thailand ==
- Thailand Route 4 (Phetkasem Road)

== Turkey ==
- O-4, a motorway in Turkey running from Istanbul to Ankara.

== United Kingdom ==
- M4 motorway (Great Britain)
- A4 road (Great Britain)
- A4 road (Northern Ireland)

== United States ==
- Interstate 4
- Interstate A-4 (Alaska; unsigned)
- Interstate H-4 (former proposal)
- U.S. Route 4
- New England Interstate Route 4 (former)
- Alabama State Route 4 (former)
  - County Route 4 (Lee County, Alabama)
- Alaska Route 4
- Arkansas Highway 4
- California State Route 4
  - County Route D4 (California)
  - County Route E4 (California)
  - County Route G4 (California)
  - County Route J4 (California)
  - County Route N4 (California)
  - County Route S4 (California)
- Connecticut Route 4
- Delaware Route 4
- Florida State Road 4
  - County Road 4 (Escambia County, Florida)
  - County Road 4 (Okaloosa County, Florida)
    - County Road 4B (Okaloosa County, Florida)
- Georgia State Route 4
  - Georgia State Route 4 (former)
- Idaho State Highway 4
- Illinois Route 4
- Indiana State Road 4
- Iowa Highway 4
- K-4 (Kansas highway)
- Kentucky Route 4
- Louisiana Highway 4
- Maine State Route 4
- Maryland Route 4
- Massachusetts Route 4
- M-4 (Michigan highway) (former)
- Minnesota State Highway 4
  - County Road 4 (Dakota County, Minnesota)
  - County Road 4 (Goodhue County, Minnesota)
  - County Road 4 (St. Louis County, Minnesota)
- Mississippi Highway 4
- Missouri Route 4 (former)
- Nebraska Highway 4
- Nevada State Route 4 (former)
- New Hampshire Route 4
- New Jersey Route 4
  - New Jersey Route 4N (former)
  - County Route 4 (Monmouth County, New Jersey)
- New Mexico State Road 4
- New York State Route 4 (1924–1927) (former)
  - County Route 4 (Broome County, New York)
  - County Route 4 (Cattaraugus County, New York)
  - County Route 4 (Chautauqua County, New York)
  - County Route 4 (Chemung County, New York)
  - County Route 4 (Chenango County, New York)
  - County Route 4 (Clinton County, New York)
  - County Route 4 (Columbia County, New York)
  - County Route 4 (Dutchess County, New York)
  - County Route 4 (Erie County, New York)
  - County Route 4 (Franklin County, New York)
  - County Route 4 (Genesee County, New York)
  - County Route 4 (Jefferson County, New York)
  - County Route 4 (Nassau County, New York)
  - County Route 4 (Oswego County, New York)
  - County Route 4 (Otsego County, New York)
  - County Route 4 (Rensselaer County, New York)
  - County Route 4 (Rockland County, New York)
  - County Route 4 (Saratoga County, New York)
  - County Route 4 (Steuben County, New York)
  - County Route 4 (Suffolk County, New York)
  - County Route 4 (Tioga County, New York)
  - County Route 4 (Ulster County, New York)
  - County Route 4 (Warren County, New York)
  - County Route 4 (Wyoming County, New York)
- North Carolina Highway 4
  - Charlotte Route 4
- North Dakota Highway 4
- Ohio State Route 4
- Oklahoma State Highway 4
- Pennsylvania Route 4 (former)
- Rhode Island Route 4
- South Carolina Highway 4
- Tennessee State Route 4
- Texas State Highway 4
  - Texas State Highway Loop 4 (former)
  - Texas Farm to Market Road 4
  - Texas Park Road 4
  - Texas Recreational Road 4
- Either of two prior designations for highways in Utah
  - Utah State Route 4 (1962-1977), the former designation for Interstate 70 in Utah
  - Utah State Route 4 (1910-1962), the state designation for several sections of multiple U.S. Highways in the northern part of the state
- Vermont Route 4A
- Virginia State Route 4
- Washington State Route 4
  - Primary State Highway 4 (Washington) (former)
- West Virginia Route 4

Territories

- Guam Highway 4
- Puerto Rico Highway 4 (former)

== Uruguay ==
- Route 4 Andrés Artigas

== Vietnam ==
- Hanoi–Haiphong Expressway
- National Route 4 (Vietnam)

== Zambia ==
- Great East Road
- M4 road (Zambia)

== See also ==
- List of highways numbered 4A

Preceded by 3	Lists of highways 4	Succeeded by 5
