= MI-4 =

MI-4, MI4, MI 4, or variant may refer to:

- MI4, British Military Intelligence Section 4
- Mil Mi-4
- Michigan's 4th congressional district
- M-4 (Michigan highway)
- Mission: Impossible – Ghost Protocol, a 2011 action film starring Tom Cruise
- Xiaomi Mi 4, an Android smartphone produced by Xiaomi Tech
- Escape from Monkey Island (also known as Monkey Island 4), videogame
