= Yaguer (mountain) =

Mountain in Djibouti

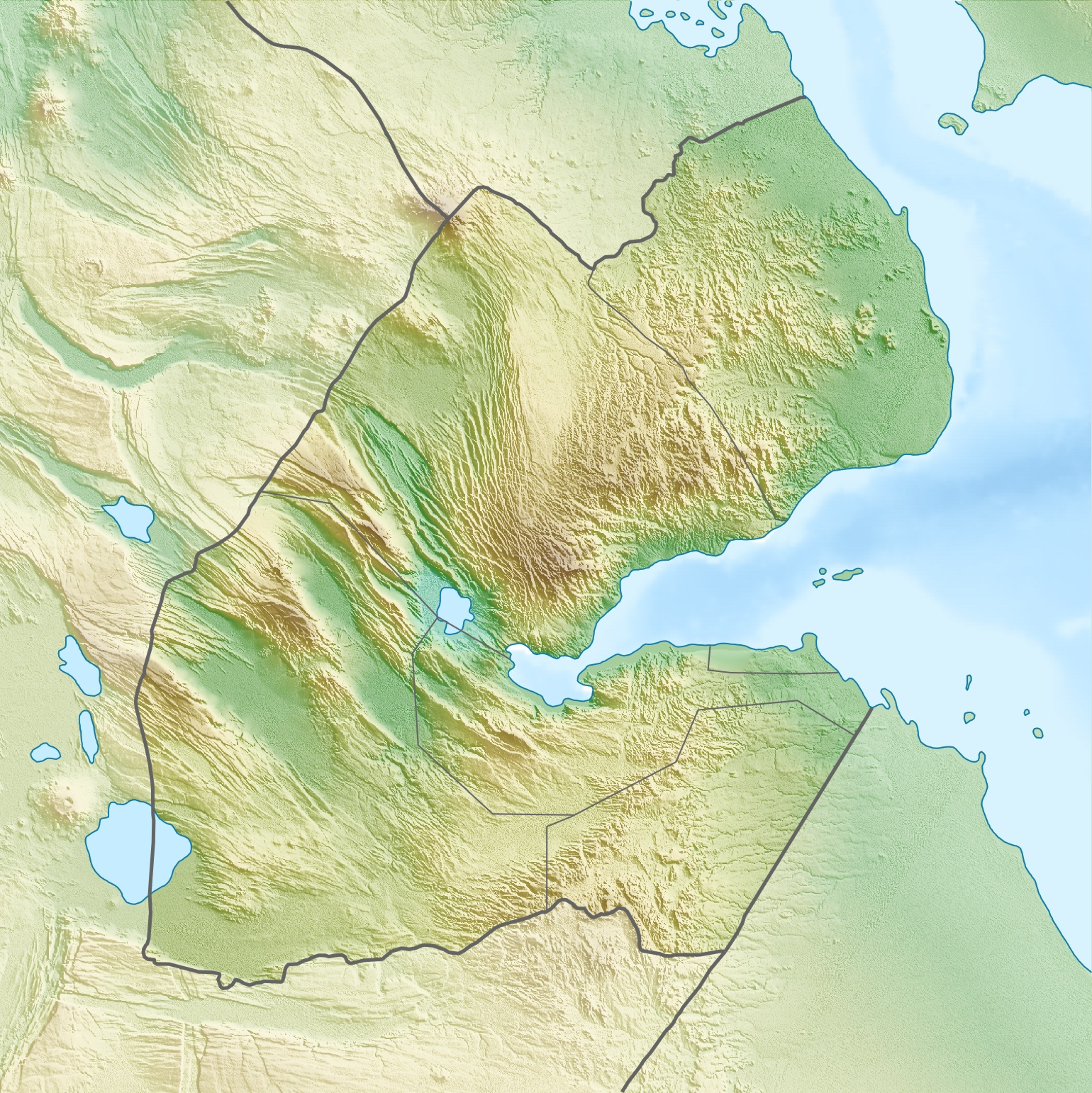
- Location within Djibouti

Highest point
- Elevation: 1,379 m (4,524 ft)
- Coordinates: 11°41′N 42°04′E

Geography
- Country: Djibouti
- Region: Dikhil Region

Yaguer is an elevated hilly plateau area in the northern part of the Dikhil Region in Djibouti. It is located about 117 kilometres (73 mi) east of Djibouti City. The mountains constitute the highest point in Dikhil Region. With a mean height of 1,379 metres (4,524 ft), it is the fourth highest point in Djibouti. The average temperature for the highlands is approximately 17 °C (63 °F).

== Overview ==
It is the main town in the region, and Yoboki is located 18 km (11 mi) to the south. A number of birds are found in the mountains, including the Egyptian vulture. Other endemic species include a number of geckos and lizards.

== Climate ==
Yaguer enjoys a mild climate throughout the winter and moderately sunny summer.

Climate data for Yaguer
Month	Jan	Feb	Mar	Apr	May	Jun	Jul	Aug	Sep	Oct	Nov	Dec	Year
Mean daily maximum °C (°F)	24.9 (76.8)	25.3 (77.5)	25.8 (78.4)	27.2 (81.0)	28.5 (83.3)	29.9 (85.8)	31.2 (88.2)	30.8 (87.4)	29.4 (84.9)	27.8 (82.0)	26.4 (79.5)	25.5 (77.9)	27.7 (81.9)
Mean daily minimum °C (°F)	13 (55)	14 (57)	15 (59)	17 (63)	18 (64)	21 (70)	23 (73)	22 (72)	21 (70)	17 (63)	15 (59)	13 (55)	17 (63)
Source: Climate Data

== See also ==
- Arrei Mountains
- Garbi
