= Arta Mountains =

Mountain range in Djibouti

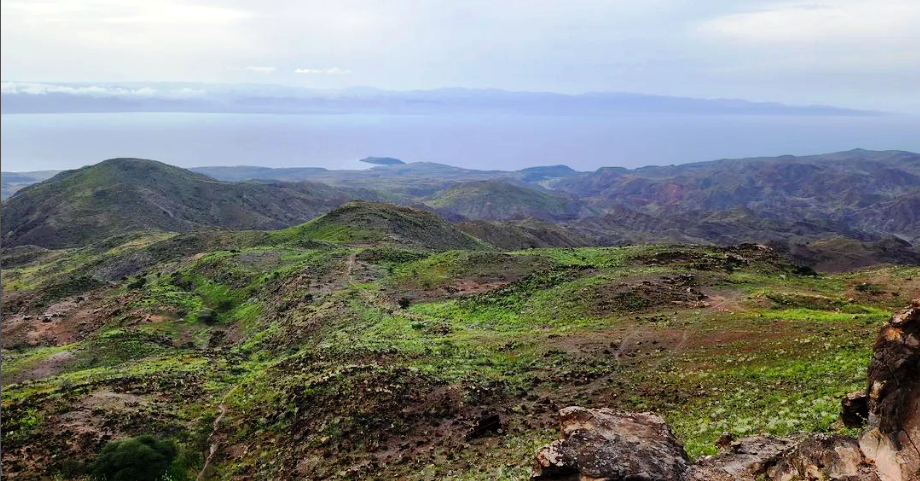
- A view of the Gulf of Tadjoura from Arta.

Highest point
- Peak: Arta
- Elevation: 755 m (2,477 ft)
- Coordinates: 11°31′08″N 42°49′58″E

Dimensions
- Length: 22 km (14 mi)
- Width: 10 km (6.2 mi)
- Area: 205 km^{2} (79 mi^{2})

Naming
- Nickname: The Great Mountains of Arta
- Native name: Buuraha Carta (Somali)

Geography
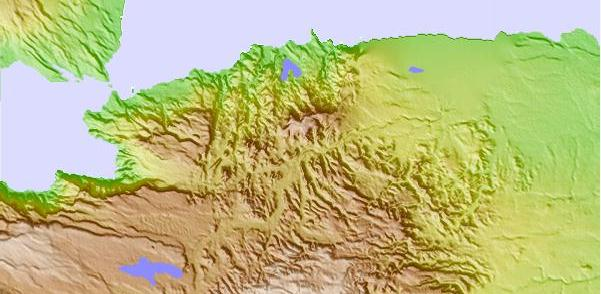
- Map of The Mountains of Arta
- Country: Djibouti
- Region: Arta Region

The Arta Mountains, also known as the Great Mountains of Arta (Somali: Buuraha Carta) are a mountain range in Djibouti. They sit at an average elevation of 700 metres (2,300 ft) above sea level, and are the tenth highest point in Djibouti. The mountains lie to the south of the Gulf of Tadjoura, in the Arta Region. They are situated approximately 35 kilometres (21 mi) west of the capital Djibouti City, and 69 kilometres (43 mi) by road from Ali Sabieh.

== Geology ==
The Arta Mountains were formed by the collision of the Arabian and Somali tectonic plates.

== Flora ==
Much of the land is covered with Buxus, Acacia, Vachellia flava and other drought tolerant plants. Doum Palms are found in the northern part of mountain near the Gulf of Tadjoura.

== Climate ==
Arta Mountains has a hot semi-arid climate (Köppen BSh) surrounded by a hot desert climate (BWh). So it has a mild fresh weather, The climate is greatly affected by its varying geographic features. Due to its location at 755 metres (2,477 ft) above sea level, Arta Mountains climate is very warm summers and cool winters.

Climate data for Arta, Djibouti (1956-1974)
Month	Jan	Feb	Mar	Apr	May	Jun	Jul	Aug	Sep	Oct	Nov	Dec	Year
Record high °C (°F)	30.1 (86.2)	28.4 (83.1)	30.8 (87.4)	34.5 (94.1)	41.2 (106.2)	40.5 (104.9)	41.0 (105.8)	39.8 (103.6)	41.0 (105.8)	36.8 (98.2)	32.0 (89.6)	30.0 (86.0)	41.2 (106.2)
Mean daily maximum °C (°F)	22.7 (72.9)	23.0 (73.4)	24.9 (76.8)	28.0 (82.4)	32.5 (90.5)	37.3 (99.1)	36.9 (98.4)	36.2 (97.2)	34.6 (94.3)	29.1 (84.4)	25.7 (78.3)	24.1 (75.4)	29.6 (85.3)
Daily mean °C (°F)	19.9 (67.8)	20.1 (68.2)	21.8 (71.2)	24.4 (75.9)	28.2 (82.8)	32.4 (90.3)	32.0 (89.6)	31.0 (87.8)	29.8 (85.6)	25.1 (77.2)	22.1 (71.8)	20.7 (69.3)	25.6 (78.1)
Mean daily minimum °C (°F)	17.1 (62.8)	17.3 (63.1)	18.7 (65.7)	20.8 (69.4)	23.9 (75.0)	27.4 (81.3)	27.0 (80.6)	25.9 (78.6)	25.0 (77.0)	21.2 (70.2)	18.5 (65.3)	17.4 (63.3)	21.7 (71.0)
Record low °C (°F)	12.8 (55.0)	13.2 (55.8)	14.5 (58.1)	14.2 (57.6)	18.0 (64.4)	21.0 (69.8)	21.5 (70.7)	19.1 (66.4)	16.6 (61.9)	17.1 (62.8)	14.5 (58.1)	13.2 (55.8)	12.8 (55.0)
Average precipitation mm (inches)	45.9 (1.81)	41.9 (1.65)	16.3 (0.64)	20.0 (0.79)	6.2 (0.24)	0.5 (0.02)	5.3 (0.21)	22.7 (0.89)	8.2 (0.32)	11.6 (0.46)	13.5 (0.53)	13.1 (0.52)	205.2 (8.08)
Average precipitation days	6.5	5.8	3.6	2.5	0.6	0.2	1.6	2.3	0.9	0.8	2.1	3.3	30.2
Mean monthly sunshine hours	164.5	160.8	200.1	248.4	290.7	282.6	262.6	272.8	268.0	286.0	262.3	221.4	2,920.1
Percentage possible sunshine	47	49	54	68	75	74	67	71	74	79	76	63	67
Source: NOAA (precipitation 1952-1974)

== See also ==
- Arta Region
