= Highway 4 (Iraq) =

Highway in Iraq

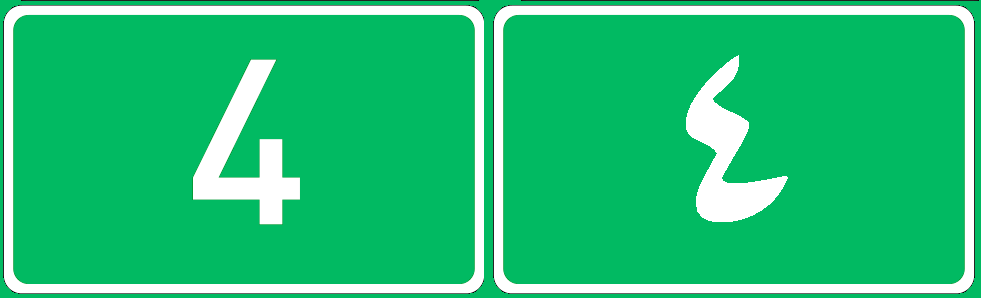
Highway 4
- ٤ طريق رقم

Location
- Country: Iraq

Highway system
- Highways in Iraq

Highway 4 is an Iraqi highway which extends from Kirkuk to As Sa'Diyah in Diyala. It passes through Sulaymaniyah, Darbandikhan and Jalawla.
