= List of highways numbered 4A =

The following highways are numbered 4A:

== United States ==
- Florida State Road 4A
  - County Route 4A (Escambia County, Florida)
- Illinois Route 4A
- Maine State Route 4A
- Missouri Route 4A
- New Hampshire Route 4A
- New Jersey Route 4A (former)
  - County Route 4A (Monmouth County, New Jersey)
- Vermont Route 4A

Territories

- Guam Highway 4A
