= Hemed (mountain) =

Mountain in Djibouti

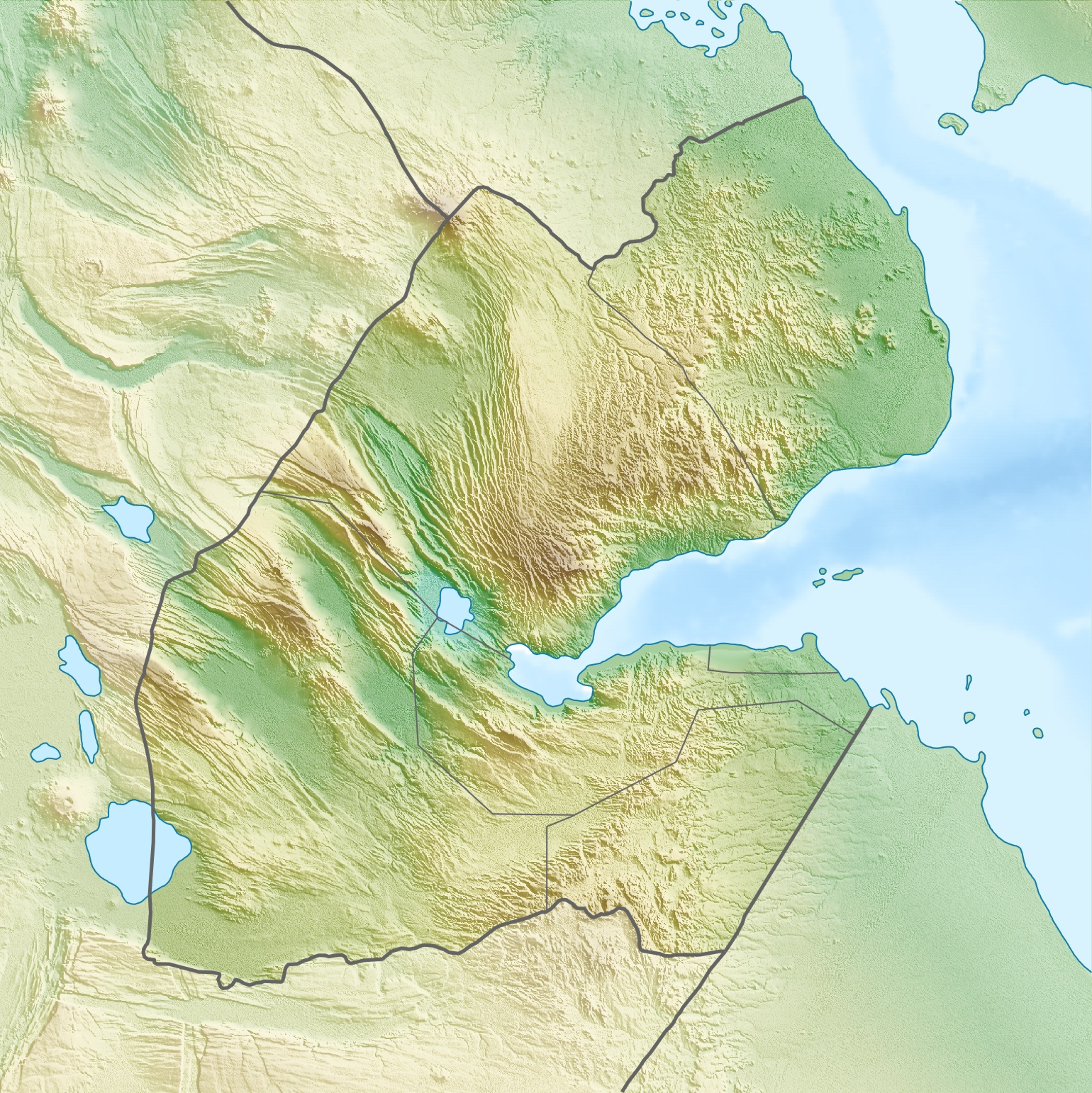
- Location within Djibouti

Highest point
- Elevation: 1,103 m (3,619 ft)
- Coordinates: 11°25′22″N 42°32′06″E

Geography
- Country: Djibouti
- Region: Arta Region

Hemed is a mountain in the western part of the Arta Region in south-central Djibouti. It is located about 70 kilometres (43 mi) east of the capital Djibouti City. The summit is 1,103 metres (3,619 ft) above sea level, is the eighth highest point in Djibouti.

== See also ==
- Mabla Mountains
