= Arta, Djibouti =

Arta Carta (Somali) عرته (Arabic)
- Town
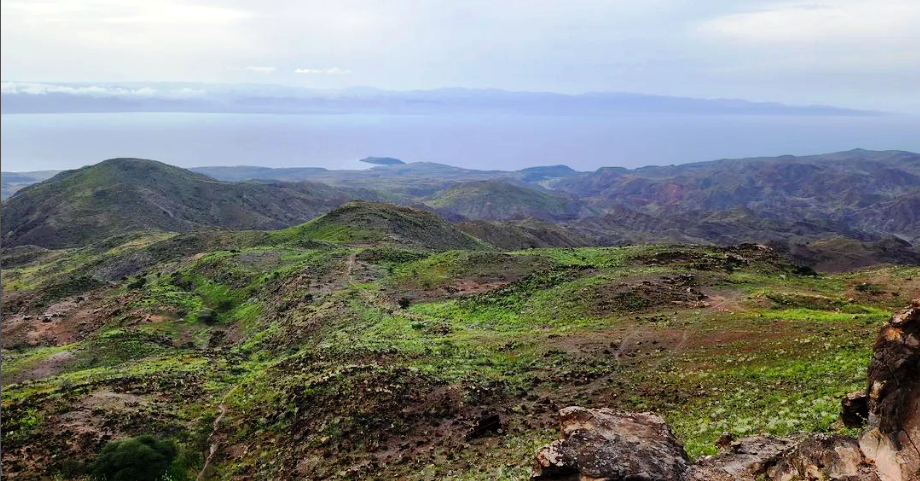
- A view of the Gulf of Tadjoura from Arta.

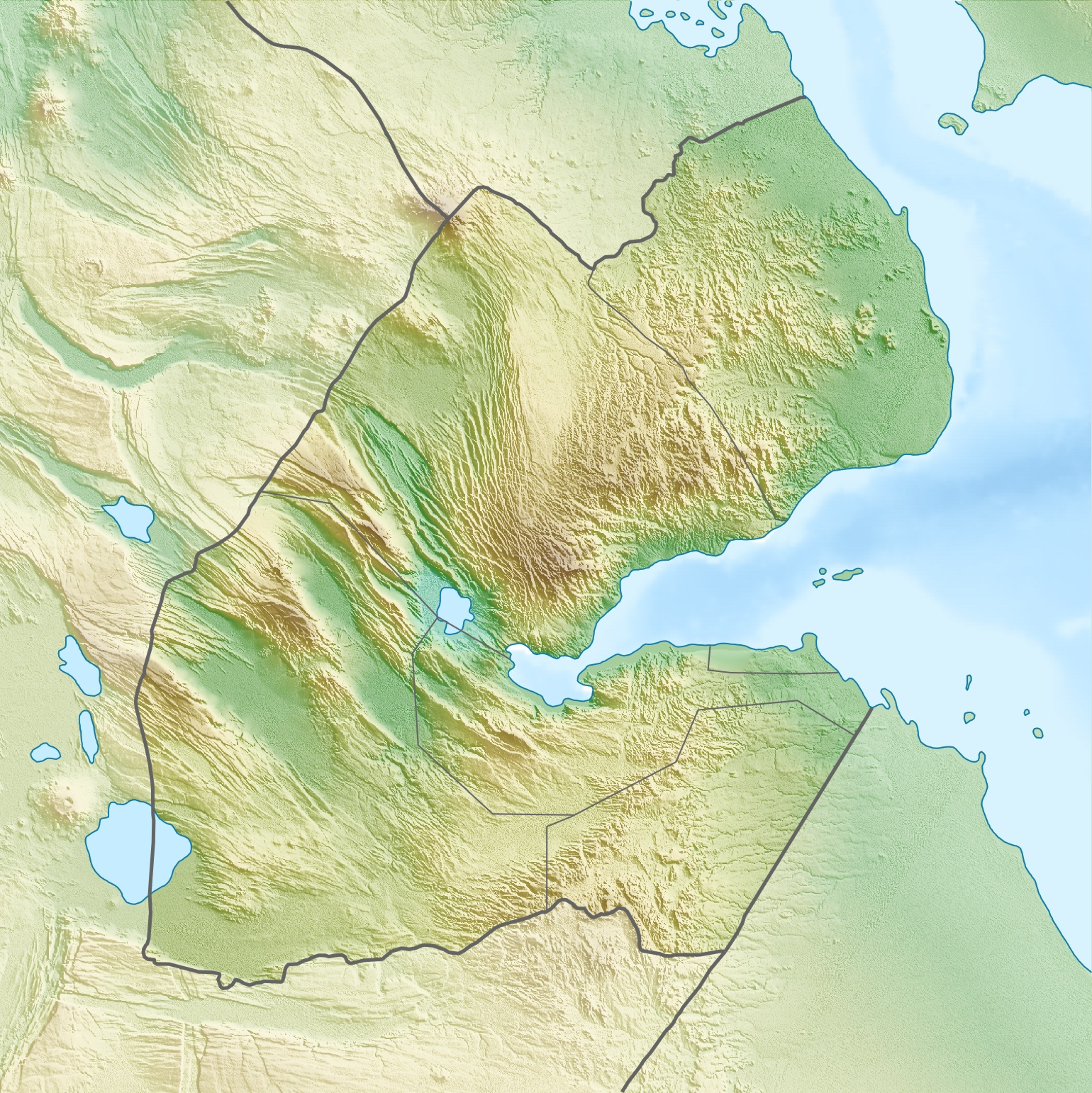
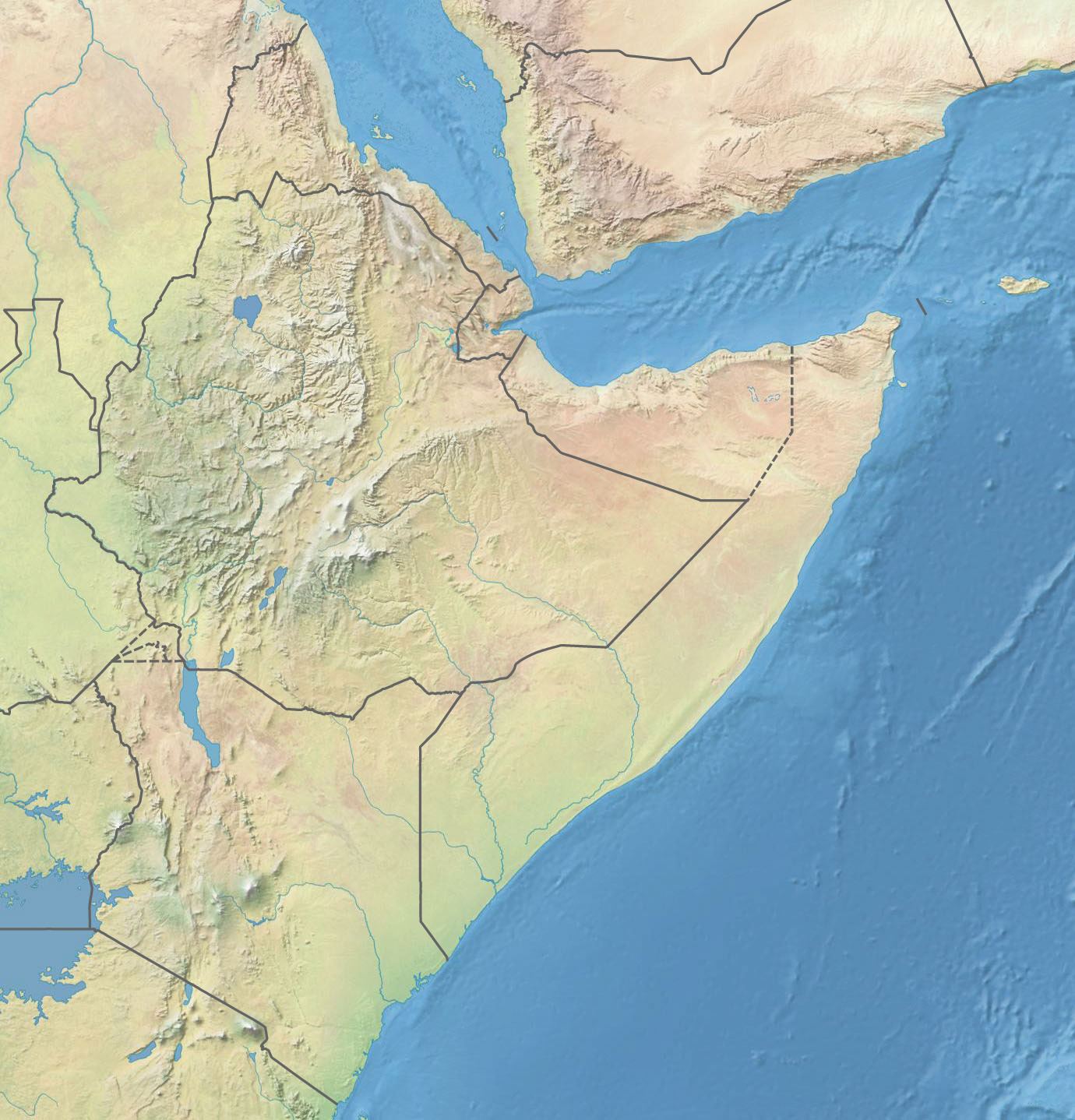
- Location within Djibouti Location within the Horn of Africa Location within Africa
- Coordinates: 11°31′25″N 42°50′50″E
- Country: Djibouti
- Region: Arta
- Established: 17th century

Area
  - Town: 7 km^{2} (2.7 sq mi)
- Elevation: 755 m (2,477 ft)

Population (2024 census)
  - Town: 11,221
  - Density: 1,600/km^{2} (4,200/sq mi)
  - Metro: 75,654 (Arta region)
- Time zone: UTC+3 (EAT)
- Climate: BSh

Arta (Somali: Carta, Arabic: عرته) is a town in southeastern Djibouti. The center of the Arta Region, it is the country's sixth-largest city. As of 2024, the population was 11,221. Arta is situated on the Mountains of Arta and is famous for its mild climate. It is located some 41 kilometres (25 miles) west of the national capital, Djibouti City.

== History ==
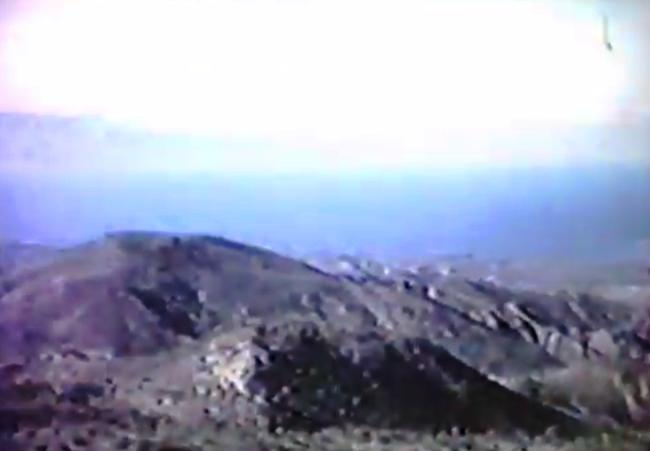
A view of the Gulf of Tadjoura from Arta (1970).

Arta was a small village when the French created their French Somaliland. During the Middle Ages, it was ruled by the Ifat and Adal Sultanates subsequently came under Ottoman and French protection in the 18th century. Arta later formed a part of the French Somaliland protectorate in the first half of the 20th century. In the December 1942 British invasion of French Somaliland, about 700 British troops and Free French troops occupied the town. Under French colonial rule in 1946, a new housing estate and hill station was built. Arta's climate lent itself to becoming the prime sanctuary of the French civil servants in Djibouti. The region of Arta is inhabited of the popular ethnic group of Djibouti, the Issa, formulated the "Declaration of Arta", in which they professed cohesion under the protection of France. They argued against the influence of the large independent neighboring countries of Ethiopia and Somalia and against the connection to one of these countries.

From May 2, 2000, peace talks between various factions of the Somali Civil War were held in the city with some 810 delegates, resulting in the establishment of the Transitional National Government of Somalia.

== Geography ==
Arta is situated on a plateau in the Arta Mountains which over looks the coastal plains, 755 m (2,477 ft) above sea level. The town is connected to other environs by National Highway 4. Public buses go from Djibouti City to Arta. It takes half an hour to get to Arta. A contracted bus ride from Djibouti city to Arta can charge between 350 Djiboutian franc. Arta's terrain is typified by its mountains. We`a is situated just down the mountain, around 3 kilometres (1.9 miles) to the south.

=== Climate ===
Arta is characterized by a hot arid climate (Köppen: BWh) with hot and dry, prolonged summers and relatively wet mild winters. It has a somewhat milder climate than other Djiboutian cities due to its higher altitude.

The summer season in Arta is moderately long, characterized by hot and dry and refreshing breezes with little rain, but relative humidity is generally low, making the heat tolerable. Average high temperatures are between 32 °C (90 °F) and 37 °C (99 °F) during summer months, and it can sometimes rise up to 41 °C (106 °F) during heat waves, and it can occasionally drop to below 19 °C (66 °F)-20 °C (68 °F) at night. Winter usually sets in around the end of November, extending through early to mid-March. Arta experiences fog coastal fog and greater cloud coverage as warm air passes over the mountains. During the winter months, average low temperatures are between 16 °C (61 °F) and 17 °C (63 °F), and it can occasionally drop to below 13 °C (55 °F). The average annual rainfall in Arta is around 205 mm (8 in)

Climate data for Arta, Djibouti (1956-1974)
Month	Jan	Feb	Mar	Apr	May	Jun	Jul	Aug	Sep	Oct	Nov	Dec	Year
Record high °C (°F)	30.1 (86.2)	28.4 (83.1)	30.8 (87.4)	34.5 (94.1)	41.2 (106.2)	40.5 (104.9)	41.0 (105.8)	39.8 (103.6)	41.0 (105.8)	36.8 (98.2)	32.0 (89.6)	30.0 (86.0)	41.2 (106.2)
Mean daily maximum °C (°F)	22.7 (72.9)	23.0 (73.4)	24.9 (76.8)	28.0 (82.4)	32.5 (90.5)	37.3 (99.1)	36.9 (98.4)	36.2 (97.2)	34.6 (94.3)	29.1 (84.4)	25.7 (78.3)	24.1 (75.4)	29.6 (85.3)
Daily mean °C (°F)	19.9 (67.8)	20.1 (68.2)	21.8 (71.2)	24.4 (75.9)	28.2 (82.8)	32.4 (90.3)	32.0 (89.6)	31.0 (87.8)	29.8 (85.6)	25.1 (77.2)	22.1 (71.8)	20.7 (69.3)	25.6 (78.1)
Mean daily minimum °C (°F)	17.1 (62.8)	17.3 (63.1)	18.7 (65.7)	20.8 (69.4)	23.9 (75.0)	27.4 (81.3)	27.0 (80.6)	25.9 (78.6)	25.0 (77.0)	21.2 (70.2)	18.5 (65.3)	17.4 (63.3)	21.7 (71.0)
Record low °C (°F)	12.8 (55.0)	13.2 (55.8)	14.5 (58.1)	14.2 (57.6)	18.0 (64.4)	21.0 (69.8)	21.5 (70.7)	19.1 (66.4)	16.6 (61.9)	17.1 (62.8)	14.5 (58.1)	13.2 (55.8)	12.8 (55.0)
Average precipitation mm (inches)	45.9 (1.81)	41.9 (1.65)	16.3 (0.64)	20.0 (0.79)	6.2 (0.24)	0.5 (0.02)	5.3 (0.21)	22.7 (0.89)	8.2 (0.32)	11.6 (0.46)	13.5 (0.53)	13.1 (0.52)	205.2 (8.08)
Average precipitation days	6.5	5.8	3.6	2.5	0.6	0.2	1.6	2.3	0.9	0.8	2.1	3.3	30.2
Mean monthly sunshine hours	164.5	160.8	200.1	248.4	290.7	282.6	262.6	272.8	268.0	286.0	262.3	221.4	2,920.1
Percentage possible sunshine	47	49	54	68	75	74	67	71	74	79	76	63	67
Source: NOAA (precipitation 1952-1974)

== Demographics ==
As of 2013, the population of Arta has been estimated to be 11,043. The town inhabitants belong to mainly Afro-Asiatic-speaking ethnic groups Issa Somali dominant.

== Twin towns – sister cities ==
Arta is twinned with:

Country	Town
Greece	Kandanos
Ethiopia	Harar
