= National Highway 4 (Djibouti) =

Road in Djibouti

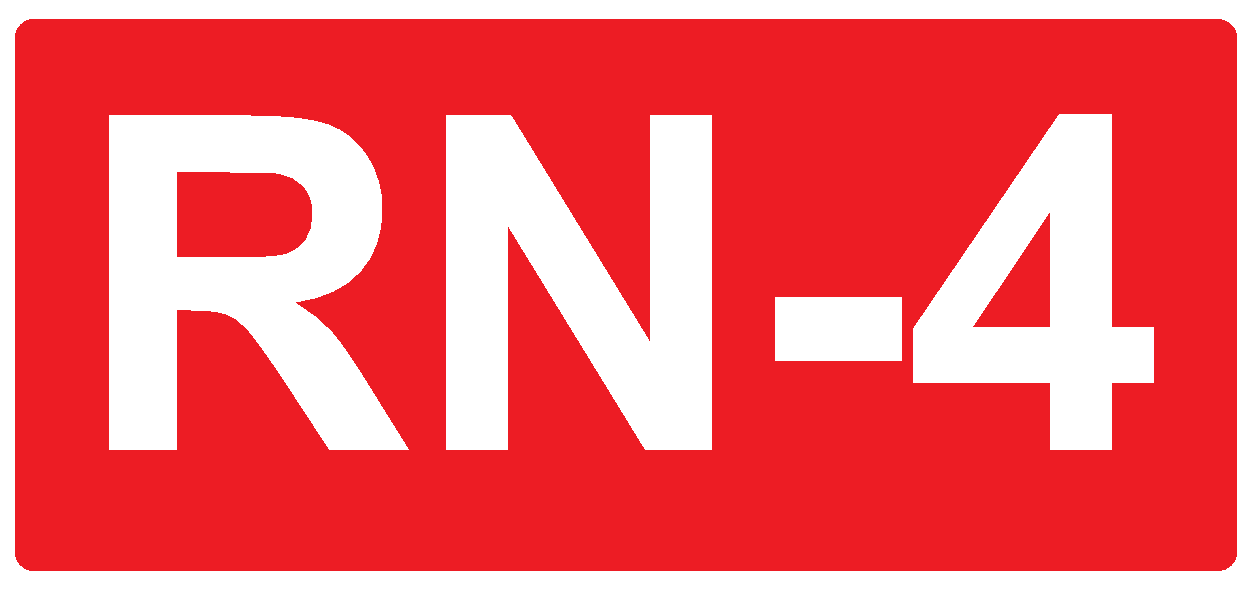
National Highway 4
- Arabic: الطريق السريع الوطنى 4 French: Route Nationale 4
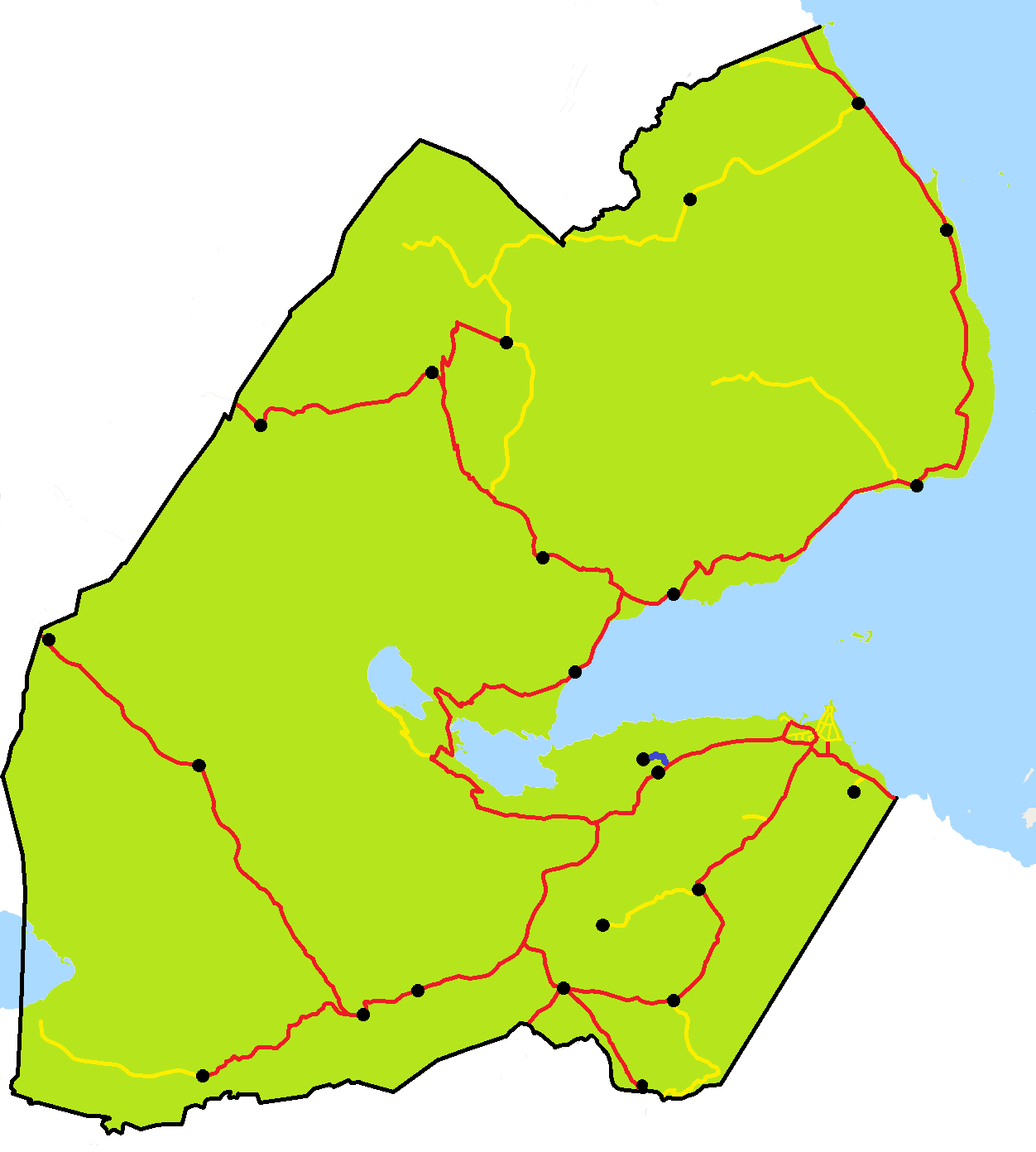

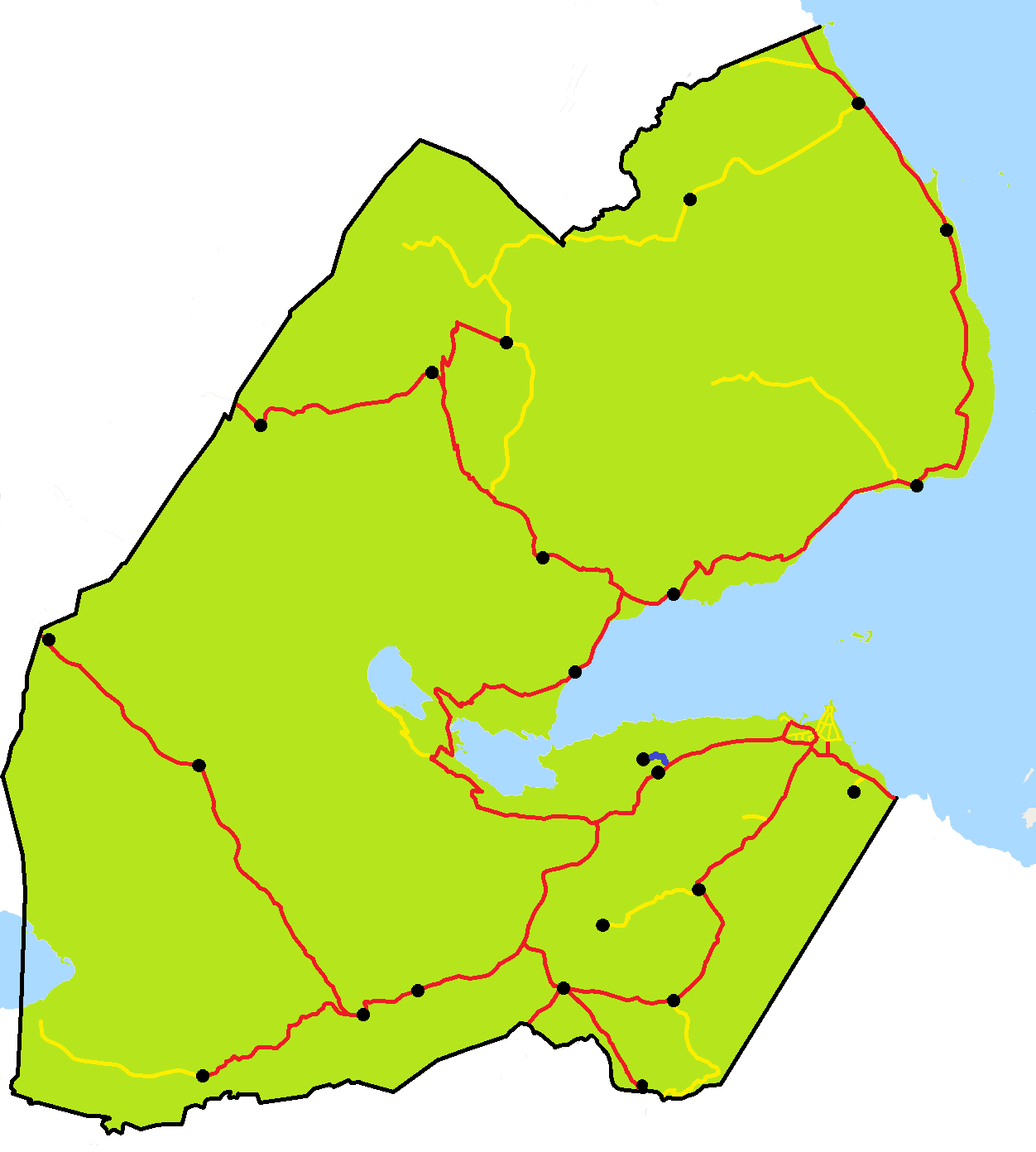

Route information
- Length: 7 km (4.3 mi)

Major junctions
- From: Junction with National Highway 1
- To: Arta

Location
- Country: Djibouti

Highway system
- Transport in Djibouti

The RN-4 National Highway is the shortest national highway of Djibouti. The highway begins at 11°31′4″N 42°53′5″E, at a junction with National Highway 1 and connects it with Arta at 11°31′30″N 42°50′36″E.
