= Garbi (mountain) =

Mountain in Djibouti

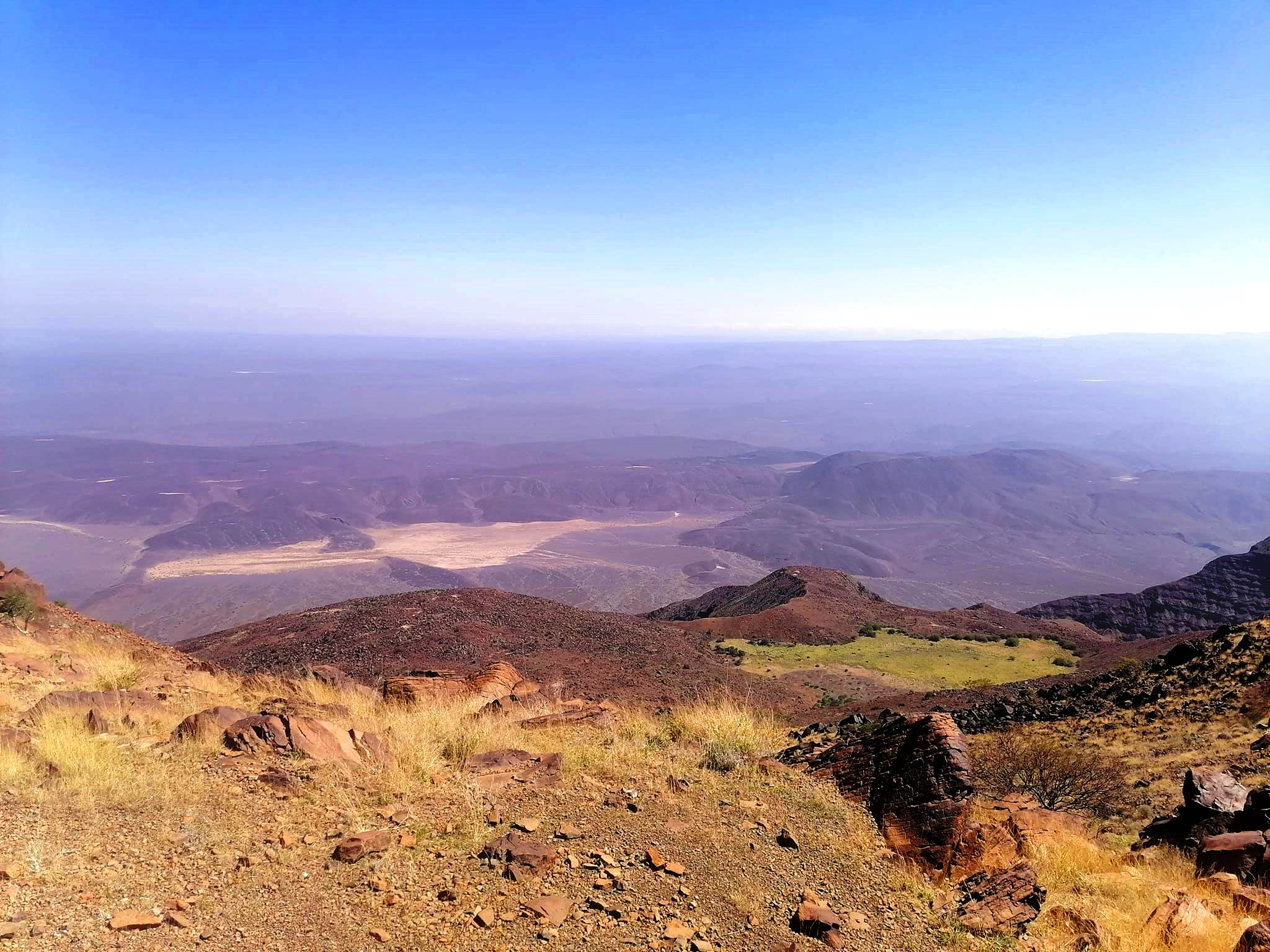

Highest point
- Elevation: 1,680 m (5,510 ft)
- Coordinates: 11°50′10″N 42°14′55″E

Dimensions
- Length: 18 km (11 mi)
- Width: 5 km (3.1 mi)
- Area: 85 km^{2} (33 mi^{2})

Geography
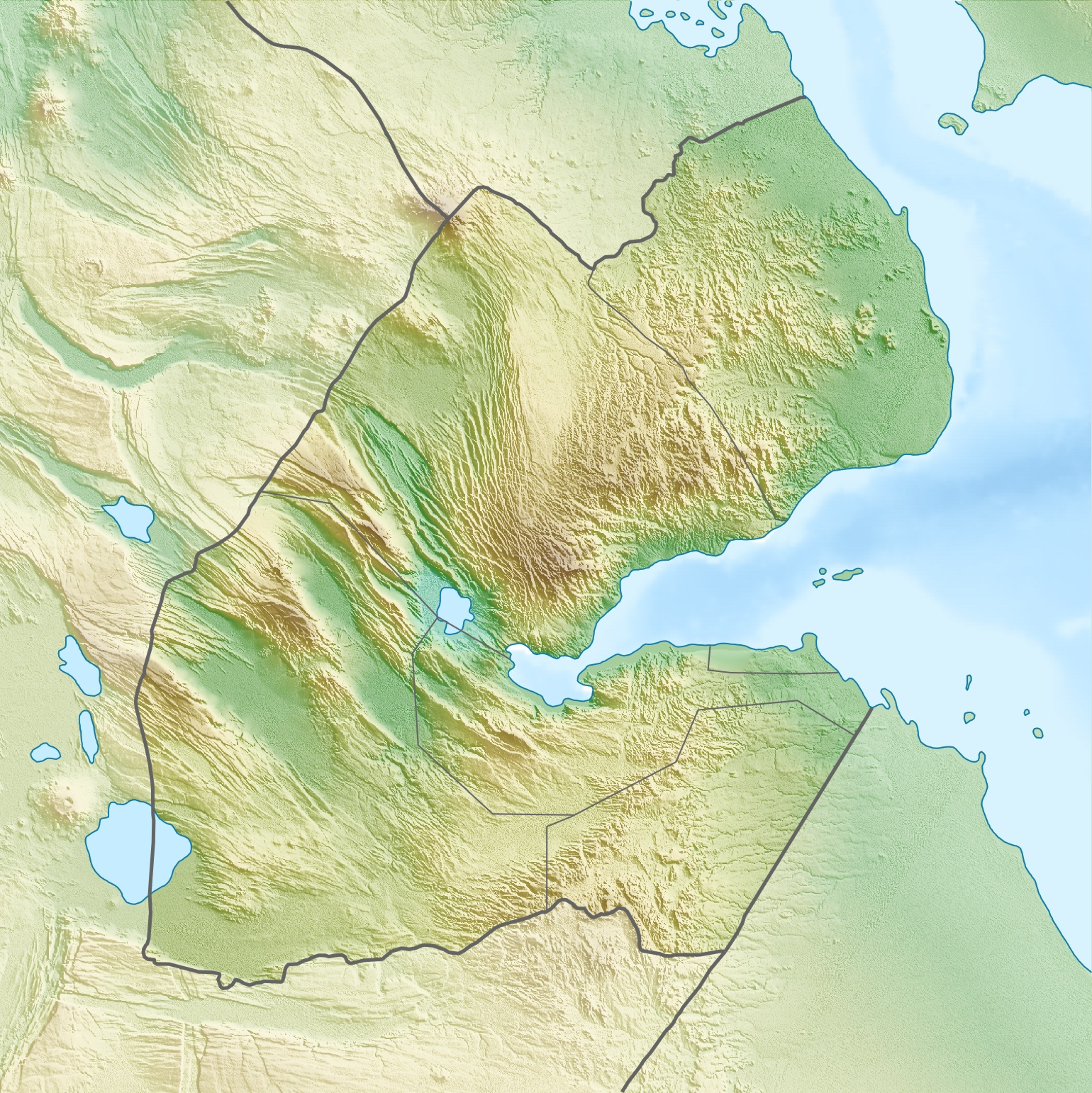
- Location within Djibouti
- Country: Djibouti
- Region: Tadjourah Region

Garbi is a mountain in the western part of the Tadjourah Region in Djibouti. It is located about 102 kilometres (63 mi) east of Djibouti City. With a mean height of 1680 metres (5,512 ft), is the third highest point in Djibouti.

== History ==
On 3 February 1982, an aircraft Nord 2501 Noratlas occupied by the 2nd Platoon of the 4th Company of the 2nd Foreign Parachute Regiment (2e REP), collided into Mont Garbi (Mount Garbi) and exploded. 36 men died, including that 27 from the Foreign Legion's 2e REP. Nobody survived. The official explanation – bad weather and incorrect barometric setting of the aircraft's altimeter.

The 4th Company of 2e REP was in Djibouti for the so-called short-duration mission, which commonly lasted 6 months at that time, to fulfil its duties in this African country as a French operational unit and to co-operate with the 13th Demi-Brigade of the Foreign Legion (13e DBLE), being placed there at that time.

== Climate ==
Elevation is the major factor in temperature levels.

Climate data for Garbi Mountain
Month	Jan	Feb	Mar	Apr	May	Jun	Jul	Aug	Sep	Oct	Nov	Dec	Year
Mean daily maximum °C (°F)	16.5 (61.7)	16.8 (62.2)	18.0 (64.4)	19.8 (67.6)	22.7 (72.8)	26.8 (80.2)	29.9 (85.9)	29.3 (84.8)	25.0 (77.0)	20.9 (69.6)	18.6 (65.4)	17.1 (62.7)	21.8 (71.2)
Mean daily minimum °C (°F)	9.8 (49.7)	10.3 (50.5)	11.6 (52.8)	13.2 (55.7)	14.8 (58.6)	17.1 (62.7)	18.9 (66.0)	18.4 (65.1)	16.7 (62.0)	13.4 (56.1)	10.9 (51.6)	10.4 (50.8)	13.8 (56.8)
Average precipitation mm (inches)	2 (0.1)	5 (0.2)	2 (0.1)	15 (0.6)	8 (0.3)	3 (0.1)	29 (1.1)	55 (2.2)	35 (1.4)	9 (0.4)	0 (0)	1 (0.0)	164 (6.5)
Source: Climate-Data.org

== See also ==
- Arrei Mountains
