= Boura Mountains =

Mountain range in Djibouti

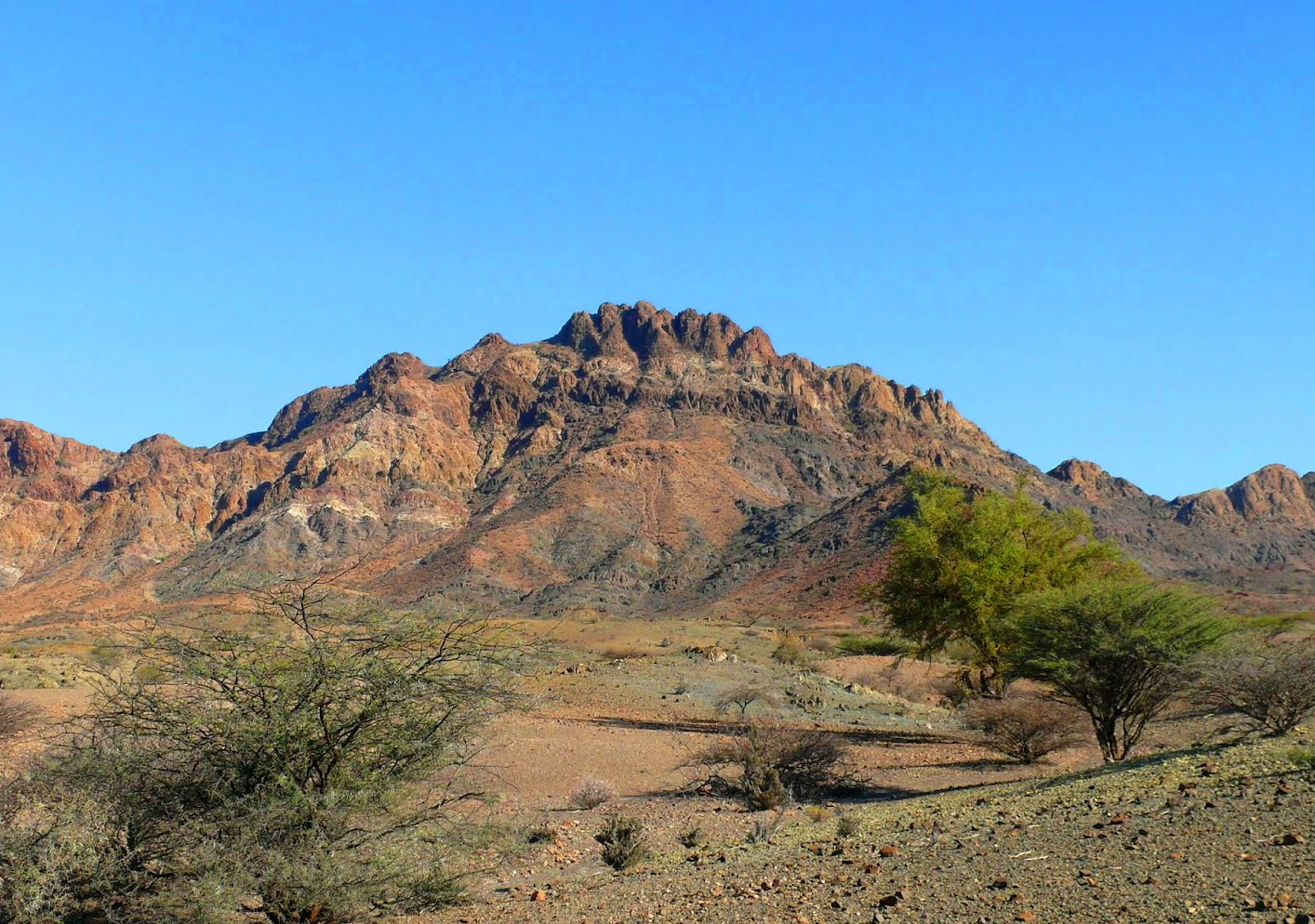
- Southern part of the Boura Mountains.

Highest point
- Elevation: 1,003 m (3,291 ft)
- Coordinates: 11°14′02″N 42°51′40″E

Dimensions
- Length: 9 km (5.6 mi)
- Width: 4 km (2.5 mi)
- Area: 39 km^{2} (15 mi^{2})

Naming
- Native name: Buuraha Buura (Somali)

Geography
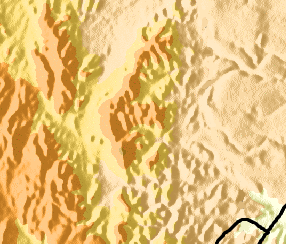
- Country: Djibouti
- Region: Ali Sabieh Region

The Boura Mountains (Somali: Buuraha Buura) are a mountain range in Djibouti. With a mean peak height of 1,003 metres (3,291 ft) is the ninth highest point in Djibouti, the ecology of this landform is semi-desert. The mountain is located approximately 32 km (20 mi) east of Ali Sabieh, 13 kilometres (8 mi) from Assamo by road. The altitude and size of the range affects its weather, with precipitation levels varying greatly and climatic conditions consisting of distinct zones. Wildlife live in the higher peaks to elevations of 1,003 metres (3,291 ft). Issa Somali have a long history in the Boura Mountains.

== Geography ==
Boura Mountains is actually a cluster of mountains with two distinct summits, each about the same height an altitude of 1000 metres (3,280 ft), cut by several valleys and wadis. The mountain forms one of the geographic resources of the area. Camels, goats and sheep are herded in and around the Boura Mountains and the herders tend to be nomadic.

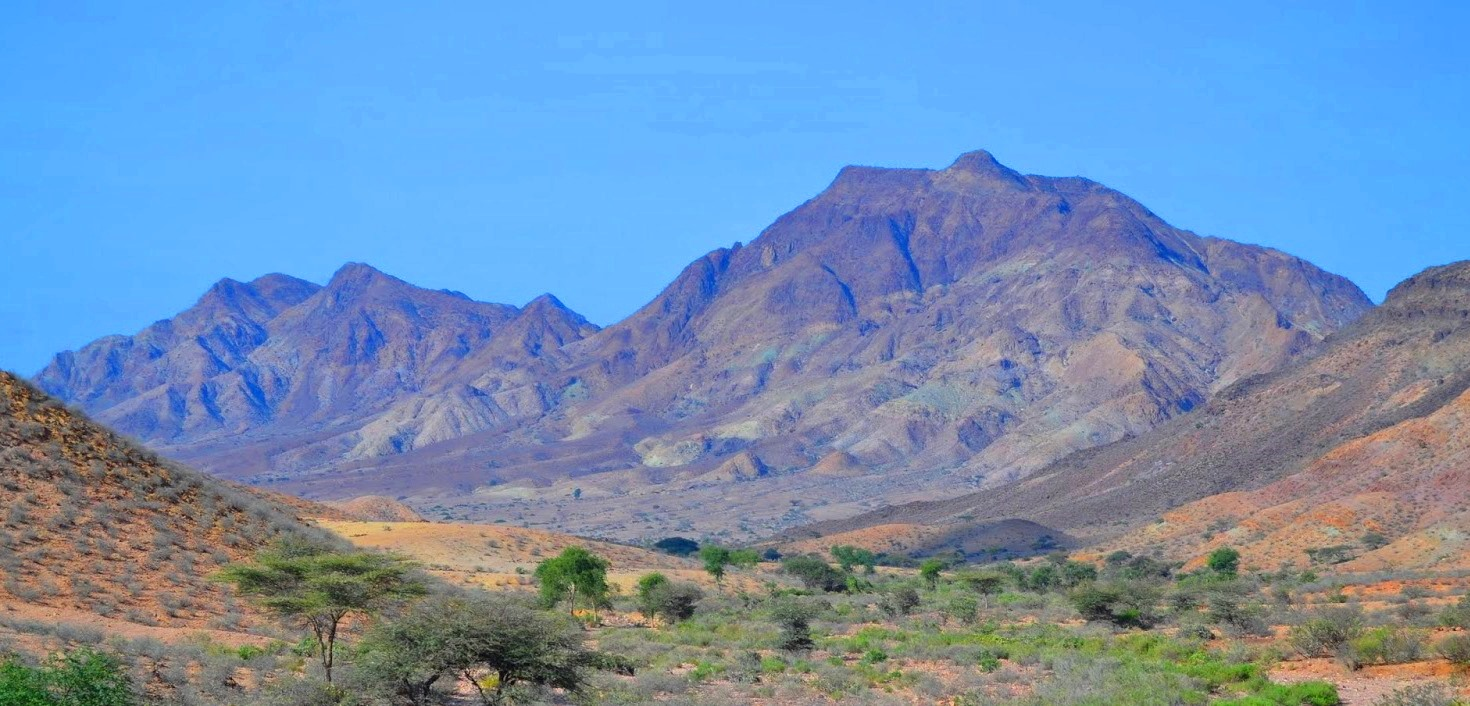
View of Boura Mountains from the south.

== Ecology ==
The geology of the Boura Mountains is complex. The dense mountain forest sits at an altitude of between 550–900 m above sea level, and has a mean annual rainfall of 200–280 mm. The highlands experience, as most tropical regions, two seasons; the rainy season is from mid-June to mid-September and the dry season from October to June. In addition to rainfall, the Boura Mountains receive additional precipitation in the form of fog and winter rains which sustain isolated forests of Juniperus, Buxus, Acacia, Acacia tortilis, Juniperus procera, etc. The Boura Mountains have attracted many animals, such as gazelles, birds, hamadryas baboon and black-backed jackal. Rainfall is limited, with variations based on elevation. The highlands enjoy a temperate, rainy summer with an average high temperature of 34 °C (93 °F) and a cool, moderately dry winter with temperatures occasionally below 13 °C (55 °F).

== Fauna and flora ==
A number of birds are found in the mountains including Egyptian vultures. Mammals include the Dorcas gazelle which is found in the Boura Mountains. The mountains are rich in plant life, including a number of different species. The vegetation changes with altitude, the mountains are covered with desert scrublands at lower elevations, growing richer and then becoming scrubland.

== Climate ==
The Boura Mountains features a somewhat rare version of a steppe climate, located close to the equator. The mountains catch the precipitation of the monsoon winds of the Gulf of Aden, resulting in a rainy season that lasts from July until mid-September. Due to its altitude of the high ranges of mountains which embrace it provide a pleasant climate, with refreshing cool summer nights and excellent spring, while winter days are pretty cold and the nights could reach 14 °C (57 °F). It is common for afternoon temperatures to be over 34 °C (93 °F) yet mornings can be extremely cooler. As a result, there is much more natural vegetation. Other issues Boura Mountains faces are soil erosion and overgrazing. All of these environmental issues produce soil degradation.

Climate data for Boura Mountains
Month	Jan	Feb	Mar	Apr	May	Jun	Jul	Aug	Sep	Oct	Nov	Dec	Year
Mean daily maximum °C (°F)	21.3 (70.3)	22.0 (71.6)	23.2 (73.8)	25.3 (77.5)	28.3 (82.9)	35.0 (95.0)	34.4 (93.9)	33.5 (92.3)	30.6 (87.1)	26.5 (79.7)	24.2 (75.6)	22.7 (72.9)	27.3 (81.1)
Mean daily minimum °C (°F)	14.9 (58.8)	15.9 (60.6)	17.2 (63.0)	18.8 (65.8)	20.6 (69.1)	24.5 (76.1)	23.2 (73.8)	23.0 (73.4)	22.3 (72.1)	19.0 (66.2)	16.5 (61.7)	15.0 (59.0)	19.2 (66.6)
Average precipitation mm (inches)	12 (0.5)	15 (0.6)	22 (0.9)	30 (1.2)	17 (0.7)	2 (0.1)	25 (1.0)	57 (2.2)	49 (1.9)	29 (1.1)	15 (0.6)	11 (0.4)	284 (11.2)
Source: Climate Data

== Hiking paths ==
The mountain has a strong undergrowth and it cannot be walked up from every direction. The main path starts on the eastern side.
