= Dagouein Mountain =

Mountain in Djibouti

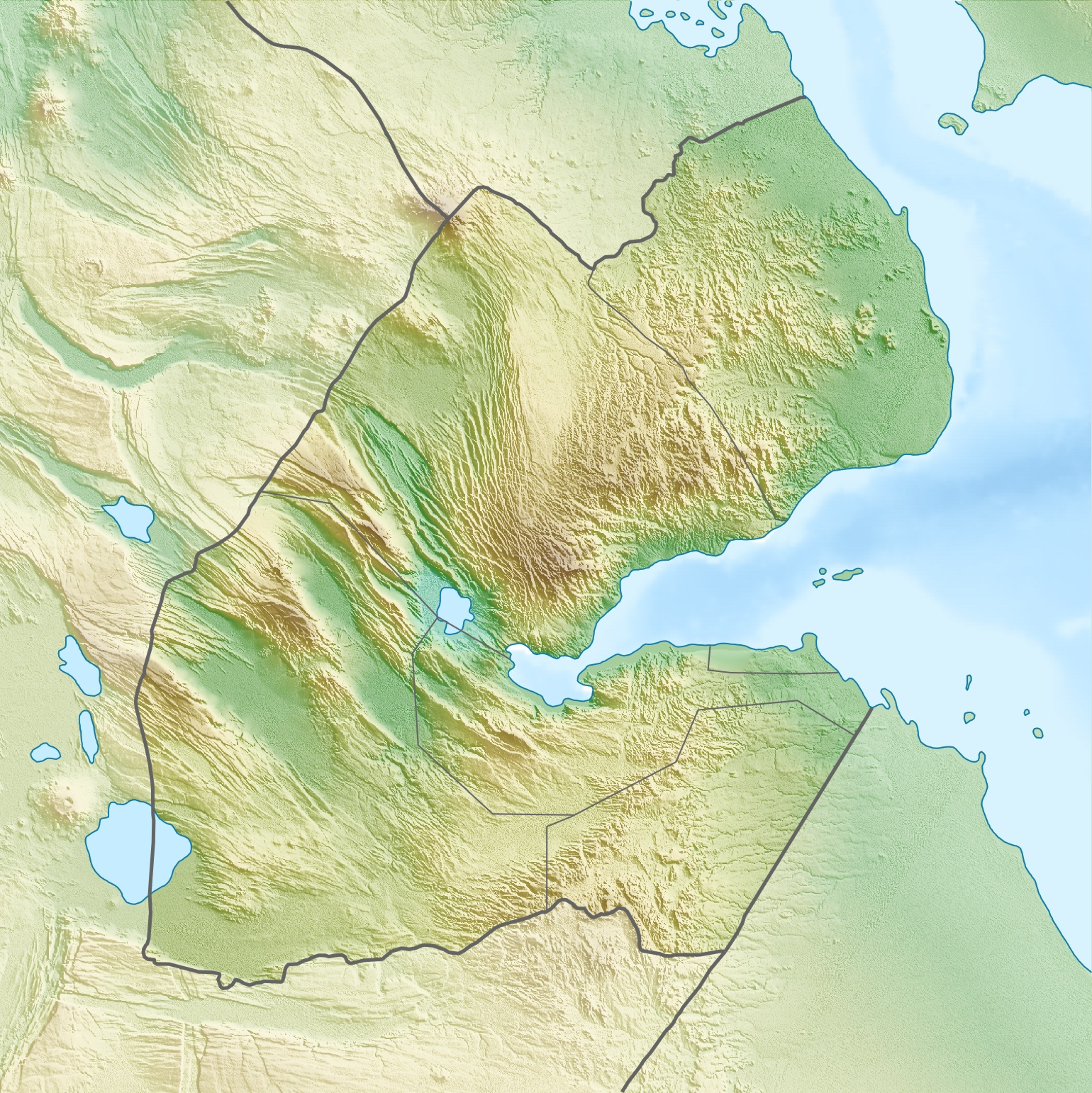
- Location within Djibouti

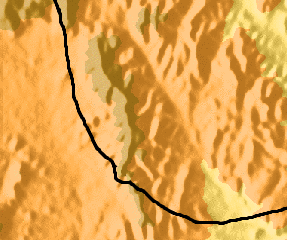
- Location in Djibouti

Highest point
- Elevation: 1,124 m (3,688 ft)
- Coordinates: 11°01′53″N 42°47′02″E

Dimensions
- Length: 8 km (5.0 mi)
- Width: 2 km (1.2 mi)
- Area: 21 km^{2} (8.1 mi^{2})

Geography
- Country: Djibouti
- Region: Ali Sabieh Region

Dagouein Mountain, with an average elevation of 1,124 metres (3,688 ft) above sea level, is the seventh highest point in Djibouti.

== Climate and geography ==
Dagouein Mountain is south of the Ali Sabieh Region in Djibouti near the Ethiopian border.
