= M-4 (Michigan highway) =

M-4, was formerly the designation of two different routes in the US state of Michigan.

- M-4 (1936–1939 Michigan highway) was the original designation of M-134 in Mackinac and Chippewa counties.
- M-4 (1979–1986 Michigan highway) was the original designation of M-10 (Northwestern Highway) from I-696/US 24 to the northern terminus.

Browse numbered routes
← M-3	MI	→ M-5
