= Arrei Mountains =

Mountain range in Djibouti

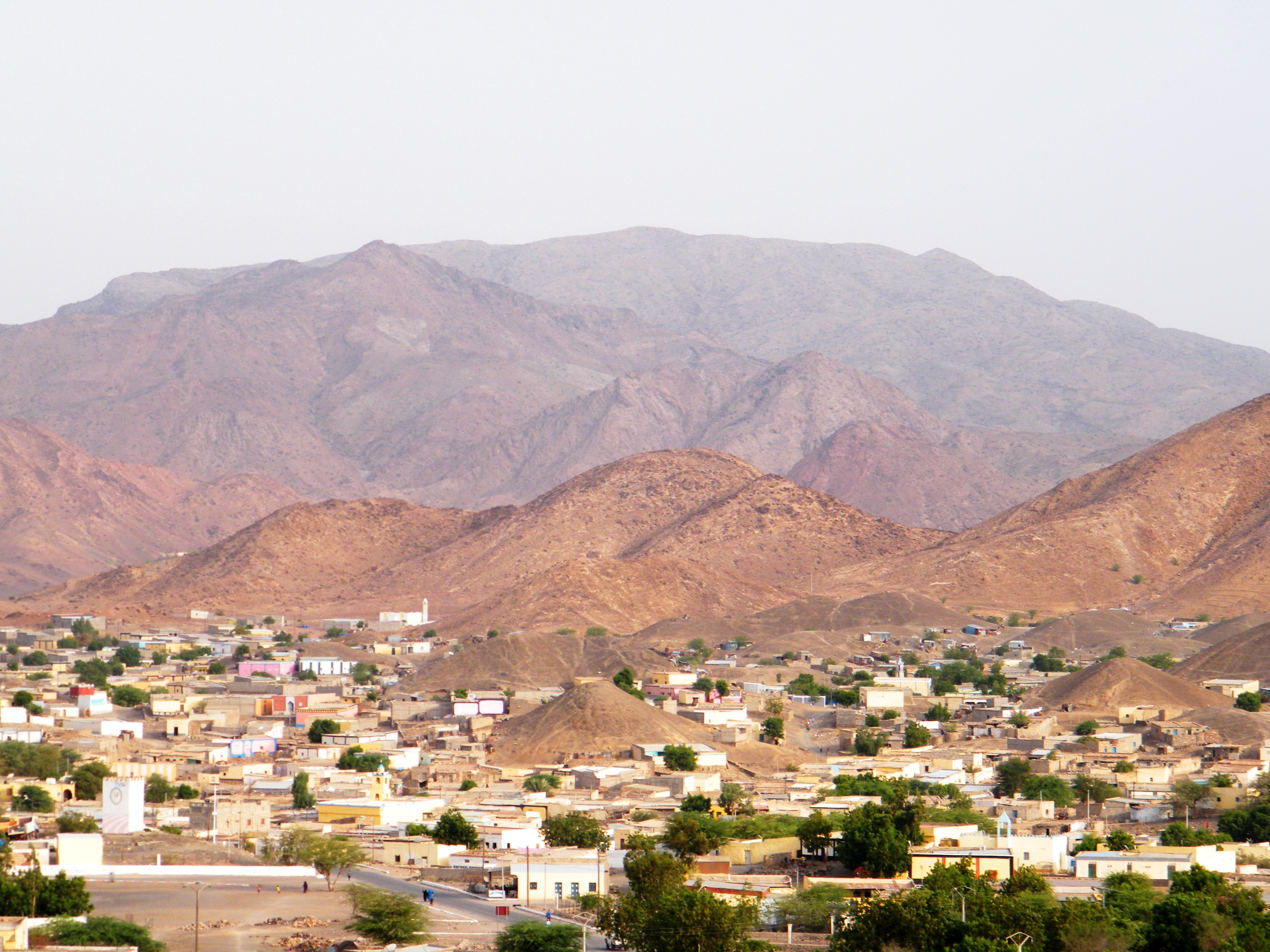
- A view of Arrei Mountains from Ali Sabieh

Highest point
- Elevation: 1,301 m (4,268 ft)
- Coordinates: 11°04′00″N 42°44′00″E

Geography
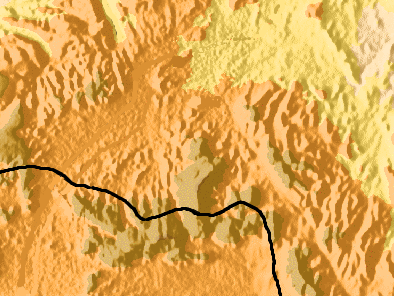
- Country: Djibouti
- Region: Ali Sabieh Region

The Arrei Mountains also known as the "Roof of Ali Sabieh", are a mountain range in the southern Ali Sabieh Region in Djibouti. With an average elevation of 1,301 metres (4,268 ft) above sea level, the sixth highest point in Djibouti, they are situated near the border with Ethiopia. The mountains constitute the highest point in Ali Sabieh region. The Issa Somali have a long history in the Arrei Mountains.

== History ==
In 1915, the Ethio-Djibouti Railways traversed the local Ali Sabieh.

It is the main town in the region, and is located 7 km northwest. The area is predominantly inhabited by the Gadabursi and Issa Somali.

== Fauna ==
A number of birds are found in the mountains including Egyptian vulture. Other endemic species include a number of geckos and lizards.

== Climate ==
Arrei Mountain's altitude and location and topography frequently lead to cool and cloudy weather conditions, which can pose a danger to ill-equipped walkers. The Arrei Mountains receives the bulk of its precipitation between the months of June and mid-September, averaging just under 269 mm of rainfall annually. The fog was present on the summit for almost 75% of the time between November and January, and 6% of the time in March and August. Arrei Mountains receives additional precipitation in the form of fog and summer rains.

Climate data for Arrei Mountains
Month	Jan	Feb	Mar	Apr	May	Jun	Jul	Aug	Sep	Oct	Nov	Dec	Year
Mean daily maximum °C (°F)	20.5 (68.9)	20.8 (69.4)	22.0 (71.6)	23.8 (74.8)	26.7 (80.1)	30.9 (87.6)	31.8 (89.2)	30.0 (86.0)	29.0 (84.2)	24.9 (76.8)	22.6 (72.7)	21.1 (70.0)	25.3 (77.6)
Mean daily minimum °C (°F)	13.3 (55.9)	14.3 (57.7)	15.6 (60.1)	17.2 (63.0)	18.8 (65.8)	20.1 (68.2)	21.9 (71.4)	20.7 (69.3)	19.8 (67.6)	17.4 (63.3)	14.9 (58.8)	13.4 (56.1)	17.3 (63.1)
Average precipitation mm (inches)	6 (0.2)	9 (0.4)	19 (0.7)	29 (1.1)	5 (0.2)	8 (0.3)	20 (0.8)	49 (1.9)	56 (2.2)	42 (1.7)	20 (0.8)	6 (0.2)	269 (10.5)
Source: Climate Data
