= Aisha (given name) =

Aisha ʿĀisha عائشة ʿAīsha عائشة
- Pronunciation: عائشة (ʿĀisha): Arabic: [ˈʕaː.i.ʃa] عائشة (ʿAīsha): Arabic: [ʕa.ˈiː.ʃa]
- Gender: Female

Origin
- Origin: Arabic
- Meaning: عائشة (ʿĀisha): living عائشة (ʿAīsha): alive

Other names
- Related names: Aishah, Aishat, Aishas, Aiisha, Aishaa, Aysha, Ayshat, Ayshee, Ayshe, Ayşe, Aiishee, Aishee, Aiishan

Aisha (Arabic: عائشة, romanized: ʿĀʾishah, lit. 'living' or 'alive'; also spelled A'aisha, A'isha, Aischa, Aische, Aishah, Aishat, Aishath, Aicha, Aïcha, Aisya, Aisyah, Aiša, Ajša, Aixa, Ayesha, Aysha, Ayşe, Ayisha, or Iesha) is an Arabic female given name. It originated from Aisha, the third wife of the Islamic prophet, Muhammad, and is a very popular name among Muslim women.

Ayesha and Aisha are common variant spellings in the Arab World and among American Muslim women in the United States, where it was ranked 2,020 out of 4,275 for females of all ages in the 1990 US Census. The name Ayesha was briefly popular among English-speakers after it appeared in the book She by Rider Haggard.

== Given name ==
=== Aisha ===
- Aisha (614–678), Wife of Prophet Muhammad
- Aisha (Latvian singer) (Aija Andrejeva, born 1986), Latvian singer
- Aisha (reggae singer) (Pamela Ross, born 1962), British singer
- Aisha Abubakar (born 1966), Nigerian politician
- Aisha Abdurrahman Bewley (born 1948), American writer and translator
- Aisha al-Adawiya (born 1944), American interfaith activist and founder of Women in Islam
- Aisha Musa Ahmad (1905–1974), Sudanese singer
- Aisha Ali (born 1997), Maldivian actress
- Aisha Ayensu, Ghanaian fashion designer
- Aisha Babangida (born 1970), Nigerian humanitarian leader
- Princess Aisha bint Hussein (born 1968), Jordanian royalty
- Aisha Naluzze Batala (born 1977), Ugandan lawyer and judge
- Aisha Bowe (born 1986), Bahamian-American aerospace engineer, founder, advocate, and entrepreneur
- Aisha Braveboy (born 1974), American politician and attorney
- Aisha Buhari (born 1971), Nigerian beauty therapist and former first lady of Nigeria
- Aisha Chaudhary (1996–2015), Indian motivational speaker
- Aisha Ali Chopra (born 1989), Indian singer, songwriter and contemporary dancer
- Aisha Dew, American politician
- Aisha Diori, African events director, community mobiliser, HIV/AIDS activist, educator, host, and has been named "Iconic Mother" in Ball culture.
- Aisha Elmquist, American politician
- Aisha Franz (born 1984), German illustrator and comic book artist
- Aisha Gurbanli (born 1993), Azerbaijani judoka
- Aisha Toussaint (born 1995), Seychellois actress
- Aisha Sultan Begum, first wife of the Mughal Emperor Babur
- A'isha bint Talhah, daughter of the prominent Muslim general Talha ibn Ubayd-Allah
- Aisha Abd al-Rahman (1913–1998), Egyptian author
- Aisha Hinds, American television and film actress
- Aisha Kahlil, American female singer
- Aisha Labib (died 1971), former First Lady of Egypt
- Aisha Uqbah Malik (born 1982), Pakistani former television and film actress
- Aisha Odeh (born 1944), Palestinian writer
- Aisha bint Khalfan bin Jameel, Omani government minister
- Aisha Muhammed-Oyebode (born 1963), Nigerian lawyer, entrepreneur, author, activist and philanthropist
- Aisha Praught-Leer (born 1989), American-Jamaican middle-distance runner
- Aisha al-Qahtani, Qatari women's rights activist
- Aisha Rateb (1928–2013), Egyptian lawyer, politician, diplomat and academic
- Aisha Syed Castro (born 1989), Dominican Republic musician
- Aisha Tyler (born 1970), American television personality
- Aisha Salaudeen (born 1994), Nigerian multimedia journalist
- Aisha Sharma (born 1992), Indian actress and model
- Aisha Stambouli (born 1984), Venezuelan actress, singer and songwriter
- Aisha Taymur (1840–1902), Egyptian social activist, poet, novelist, and feminist
- Aisha Wahab (born 1987/88), American politician
- Aisha Yesufu (born 1973), Nigerian political activist and businesswoman

==== Fictional characters ====
- Aisha (Gundam SEED), a character from Gundam SEED
- Aisha Krishnam, a character from the anime Sky Girls
- Aisha (Romancing SaGa), a character in the Romancing SaGa video game
- Aisha (Rumble Roses), a character in the Rumble Roses video game series
- Aisha (Winx Club), a character from the Winx Club franchise
- Aisha Campbell, a character portrayed by Karan Ashley in the 1990s action television series Mighty Morphin Power Rangers
- Aisha Clan-Clan, a character from the anime Outlaw Star
- Aisha Kapoor, a character portrayed by Sonam Kapoor in the 2010 film Aisha
- Aisha Greyrat, a character from the light novel Mushoku Tensei
- Ayesha, a name used by the Marvel Comics character Kismet (Marvel Comics)
- Aisha Laborn, a character from Worm (web serial)
- Aisha Landar, a character from Elsword

=== Aishah ===
- Aishah Sinclair (born 1980), Malaysian actress
- Wan Aishah Wan Ariffin (born 1965), commonly known as 'Aishah', Malaysian singer and politician
  - Aishah and The Fan Club, New Zealand-based band that Aishah had fronted

=== Aicha ===
- Princess Lalla Aicha of Morocco (1931–2011), Moroccan princess
- Aicha Bassarewan, East Timorese politician
- Aicha Nénette Conté, Guinean diplomat and politician
- Aicha Coulibaly (born 2001), Malian basketball player
- Aicha Davis, American politician
- Aïchatou Mindaoudou (born 1959), politician of Niger
- Aicha Ndour (born 2000), Senegalese basketball player

=== Ajša ===
- Ajša Sivka (born 2005), Slovenian basketball player

=== Aixa ===
- Aixa al-Horra, Sultanah consort of Granada

=== Aesha ===
- Aesha Ash (born 1977), American ballet dancer and teacher
- Aesha Mohammadzai (born 1991), also known as Bibi Aisha, Afghan woman who fled from an abusive marriage
- Aesha Waks, American actress

=== Ayesha ===
- Ayesha Al-Taymuriyya (1840–1902), Egyptian author
- Ayesha Harruna Attah (born 1983), Ghanaian writer
- Ayesha Hazarika, Baroness Hazarika (born 1975), Scottish broadcaster, journalist and political commentator
- Ayesha Curry (born 1989), Canadian-American actress and television personality
- Ayesha Dharker (born 1977), British actress
- Ayesha Faridi (born 1979), anchor for the Indian business news channel CNBC TV18
- Ayesha Erotica (born 1996), American record producer and singer
- Ayesha Gaddafi (born 1976), daughter of Muammar Gaddafi
- Ayesha Jalal (born 1956), Pakistani-American sociologist and historian
- Ayesha Jhulka (born 1972), Indian film actress
- Ayesha Kapur (born 1994), Indian film actress
- Ayesha Omar (born 1981), Pakistani actress and singer
- Ayesha Quraishi (born 1981), Botswana-born Swedish performer
- Ayesha Rascoe (born 1986), American journalist
- Ayesha Rauf (1914-1992), Sri Lankan educator and politician
- Ayesha Saffar (1078–1153), Iranian narrator
- Ayesha Sana (born 1972), Pakistani actress
- Ayesha Siddiqa (born 1966), Pakistani security analyst and strategic affairs columnist
- Ayesha Takia (born 1986), Indian actress who appears in Bollywood movies
- Bibi Ayesha, warlord in Afghanistan also known as Commander Kaftar
- Natalia Ayesha Grosvenor, Dowager Duchess of Westminster (née Phillips; born 1959), British aristocrat, philanthropist and winemaker

=== Ayşe ===
- Ayşe Arman (born 1969), Turkish journalist and author
- Ayşe Beril Boyacı (born 2008), Turkish judoka
- Ayşe Dinç (born 1999), Turkish handball player
- Ayşe Begüm Onbaşı (born 2001), Turkish aerobic gymnast
- Ayşe Cora (born 1993), Turkish basketball player
- Ayşe Çürük (born 2001), Turkish volleyball plsyer
- Ayşe Erzan (born 1949), Turkish theoretical physicist
- Ayşe Hafsa Sultan (1478/79–1534), Ottoman sultan Selim I's concubine and the mother of Süleyman the Magnificent
- Ayşe Hatun (1476–1539), Ottoman Sultan Selim I's consort
- Ayşe Gülbahar Hatun (1453–1505), the concubine of Ottoman Sultan Bayezid II and the mother of Sultan Selim I
- Ayşe Hatun Önal (born 1978), Turkish model, actress, singer and Miss Turkey 1999
- Ayşe Kulin (born 1941), Turkish novelist
- Ayşe Kuru (born 1974), Turkish women's footballer
- Ayşe Melis Gürkaynak (born 1990), Turkish volleyball player
- Ayşe Önal (born 1955), Turkish journalist and writer
- Ayşe Ören (born 1980), Turkish designer and sculptor
- Ayşe Şahin, Turkish-American mathematician
- Ayşe Seitmuratova (1937–2025), Uzbek Crimean Tatar civil rights activist
- Ayşe Sezgin (born 1958), Turkish diplomat and former ambassador
- Ayşe Sineperver Sultan (1760–1828), the wife of Ottoman Sultan Abdul Hamid I and the mother of Mustafa IV
- Ayşe Sinirlioğlu (born 1956), Turkish diplomat and ambassador
- Ayşe Şan (1938–1996), Kurdish singer
- Ayşe Şekibe İnsel (1886–1970), Turkish farmer and politician
- Ayşe Sultan (disambiguation) - various Ottoman princesses
- Ayşe Tekdal (born 1999), Turkish race walker
- Ayse Yigit (born 1972), Belgian politician

=== Aishath ===
- Aishath Inaya (born 1968), Maldivian singer
- Aishath Rishmy (born 1985), Maldivian actress
- Aishath Sausan (born 1988), Maldivian swimmer
- Aishath Sajina (born 1997), Maldivian swimmer

=== Aische ===
- Aische Pervers (born 1986), German pornographic actress

== See also ==
- Aisha (disambiguation)
- Arabic name
- Ayşegül
- Turkish name
