= Aisha (disambiguation) =

Aisha (Arabic: عائشة, romanized: ʿĀʾisha; c. 613–678), was the third wife of Muhammad.

Aisha or variant spellings may also refer to:

== Arts and entertainment ==
=== Film ===
- Aisha (1953 film), an Egyptian drama
- Aisha (2010 film), an Indian romantic comedy-drama, an adaptation Jane Austen's Emma
- Aisha (2022 film), an Irish drama
- Aayisha, a 1964 Indian Malayalam film
- Ayisha (film), a 2023 Indian film

=== Music ===
- "Aisha", a song by John Coltrane from the 1961 album Olé Coltrane
- "Aisha", a 1999 song by Death in Vegas
- "Aïcha", a 1996 song by Khaled
- "Aïcha", a 2003 song by Singuila
- "Ayesha", a 2019 song by Cupcakke

=== Other uses in arts and entertainment ===
- Ayesha (novel), by H. Rider Haggard, 1905, a sequel to She
  - The titular character of both novels is also named Ayesha.
- Aisha (TV series), a Maldivian television series
- A.I.SHA My Virtual Girlfriend, an Indian TV series
- Kismet (Marvel Comics), a fictional character also known as Ayesha
- Aisha, a character from the Italian animated series Winx Club
- Aisha Banerjee, fictional character in the 2009 Indian film Wake Up Sid, played by Konkona Sen Sharma
- Ayesha, fictional character in the 2014 Indian film Ek Villain, played by Shraddha Kapoor

== People ==
- Aisha (given name), an Arabic female given name, including a list of people and fictional characters with the name
- Aisha (Latvian singer) (Aija Andrejeva, born 1986)
- Aisha (poet) (ʿĀʾisha bint Aḥmad al-Qurṭubiyya), a 10th-century poet
- Aisha (British singer) (Pamela Ross, born 1962), a roots reggae singer
- Aishah (singer) (Wan Aishah binti Wan Ariffin, born 1965), a Malaysian singer and politician
- Aisha (아샤), member of South Korean girl group Everglow

== Places ==
- Ayesha (woreda), Ethiopia
  - Aysha, Ethiopia is a town located in the woreda
- Ayesha River, Ethiopia

== Other uses ==
- Ayesha (cicada), a genus of cicadas
- Aysha (spider), a genus of spiders
- Ayesha (ship), a wooden topsail schooner, launched 1907
- Aisha Association for Woman and Child Protection
- Ayesha pole move, an advanced pole dance position

== See also ==
- Aysheaia, an extinct genus of fossil organisms
