= Shinile (woreda) =

District in Somali Region, Ethiopia

Coordinates: 10°20′N 42°00′E

Shinile is a woreda in Somali Region, Ethiopia. Part of the Sitti Zone, Shinile is bordered on the south by Dire Dawa, on the west by Erer, on the north by the Afar Region, on the east by Ayesha, and on the southeast by Dembel and Jijiga Zone. Towns in Shinile include Adigale, Harewa, Milo, and Shinile; villages include Jaldessa, Marmaarsa, and Toome.

The average elevation in this woreda is 759 meters above sea level. As of 2008, Shinile has 365 kilometers of community roads; about 20.2% of the total population has access to drinking water. The track of the Addis Ababa–Djibouti Railway crosses this woreda, running in a direct course southwest from Adigale to Dire Dawa. The track of the Ethio-Djibouti Railways also crosses this woreda with a number of train stations.

== History ==
In mid-2003 Shinile suffered one of the worst shortages of food and water in the Somali Zone for food and water shortage, the Addis Tribune reported 31 October 2003. Products such as milk and butter were rarely available, and health care was virtually non-existent, with only one medical doctor to address the needs of 446,000 refugees.

Shinile along with the neighboring Ayesha and Afdem woredas were reported to have had an outbreak of locusts in April, 2007. Despite extensive spraying in those woredas, an investigation on 3 May revealed 900 hectares near Harewa were still infested. Although measures to control this newly discovered group were taken, authorities predict the eastern part of Ethiopia will be attacked by a swarm in mid-June of that year.

The Ethiopian De-mining Office reported in November 2008 that it had cleared land mines planted in Shinile as part of the four million square meters of land the office had cleared in the Somali Region.

== Demographics ==
Based on the 2017 Census conducted by the Central Statistical Agency of Ethiopia (CSA), this woreda has a total population of 133,038, of whom 70,592 are men and 62,446 women. While 26,651 are urban inhabitants, a further 106,387 were pastoralists.

Based on the 2007 Census conducted by the Central Statistical Agency of Ethiopia (CSA), this woreda has a total population of 102,574, of whom 56,232 are men and 46,342 women. While 19,799 or 19.3% are urban inhabitants, a further 28,756 or 28.03% are pastoralists. 98.76% of the population said they were Muslim.

The 1997 national census reported a total population for this woreda of 89,116, of whom 48,218 were men and 40,898 were women; 18,218 or 20.44% of its population were urban dwellers. The largest ethnic group reported in Shinile was the Somali 88,362 (99.1%).

== Agriculture ==
A sample enumeration performed by the CSA in 2001 interviewed 2139 farmers in this woreda, who held an average of 0.17 hectares of land. Of the 359 hectares of private land surveyed, 64.9% was under cultivation, 19.22% pasture, 5.57% fallow, and 10.31% was devoted to other uses; the percentage in woodland was missing. For the land under cultivation in this woreda, 63.79% is planted in cereals like teff and sorghum, and none in pulses; the percentage for vegetables and root crops is missing. Permanent crops included 2.12 hectares planted in fruit trees. 34.5% of the farmers both raise crops and livestock, while 1.54% only grow crops and 63.96% only raise livestock. Land tenure in this woreda is distributed between 95.55% own their land, and the remaining 4.45% reporting are held under other forms of tenure; the numbers for those who rent are missing.
