= Āfdem =

Āfdem አፍደም
- Location within Ethiopia
- Coordinates: 09°28′N 41°00′E
- Country: Ethiopia
- Region: Somali
- Zone: Sitti Zone
- Elevation: 1,058 m (3,471 ft)

Population (2024)
  - Total: 112,840
- Time zone: UTC+3 (EAT)

Āfdem (Amharic: አፍደም)is a town is east central Ethiopia. Located in the Sitti Zone of the Somali Region. It is located 59 km east of Shinile. It is the administrative center of Afdem woreda. It sprawls on a wide basin surrounded by granitic mountains on all sides.

Āfdem lies at the base of its namesake Mount Afdem, a volcanic cone with a denuded caldera. Postal service for the town began at least as early as 1944; Āfdem had phone service by 1967. Āfdem is served by a railway station on the Addis Ababa - Djibouti Railway.

== History ==
The time of the Italian occupation of Ethiopia, the steam engines were Littorina replaced locomotives, which shortened the travel time between Addis Ababa and Dire Dawa from two days to one day. The trains stopped now about noon on Awash, and the station Afdem therefore lost in importance. In 1984 the village had 805 inhabitants. Āfdem was given an important boost with the arrival of the railway. By the early 1930s, the town had an important railway station because trains traveling both directions would pass each other there. Town amenities included a telegraph station and a good restaurant with some hotel rooms. By 1962, Āfdem was located on a dry-weather that ran from Mieso to Gota.

== Climate ==
Āfdem features a Semi arid but is influenced by the highland that are close by and gets around 600mm of rainfall a year so the land is somewhat well watered with warm, but hot, summers and cool winters. The town is known for its pleasant climate during the summer periods. Between mid May and early September. The annual high temperature is an average of 27.7 °C and low 13.5 °C.

Climate data for Āfdem
Month	Jan	Feb	Mar	Apr	May	Jun	Jul	Aug	Sep	Oct	Nov	Dec	Year
Mean daily maximum °C (°F)	29.0 (84.2)	29.8 (85.6)	31.3 (88.3)	32.2 (90.0)	33.4 (92.1)	34.7 (94.5)	32.8 (91.0)	31.4 (88.5)	32.1 (89.8)	31.8 (89.2)	29.9 (85.8)	28.9 (84.0)	31.4 (88.6)
Daily mean °C (°F)	21.7 (71.1)	22.8 (73.0)	24.4 (75.9)	25.3 (77.5)	26.2 (79.2)	27.7 (81.9)	26.1 (79.0)	25.1 (77.2)	25.7 (78.3)	24.5 (76.1)	22.2 (72.0)	21.1 (70.0)	24.4 (75.9)
Mean daily minimum °C (°F)	14.5 (58.1)	15.8 (60.4)	17.6 (63.7)	18.4 (65.1)	19.1 (66.4)	20.8 (69.4)	19.5 (67.1)	18.9 (66.0)	19.4 (66.9)	17.3 (63.1)	14.6 (58.3)	13.5 (56.3)	17.5 (63.4)
Average rainfall mm (inches)	21 (0.8)	44 (1.7)	62 (2.4)	84 (3.3)	57 (2.2)	36 (1.4)	93 (3.7)	134 (5.3)	69 (2.7)	26 (1.0)	16 (0.6)	7 (0.3)	649 (25.4)
Source: Climate data for: Āfdem

== Demographics ==
Based on figures from the Central Statistical Agency of Ethiopia published in 2005, Āfdem has an estimated total population of 2,129 of whom 1,092 are men and 1,037 women. The town's inhabitants belong to various mainly Afro-Asiatic-speaking ethnic group, with the Issa predominant.

The 1997 census reported this town had a total population of 1,428 of whom 721 were men and 707 women. The three largest ethnic groups reported in this town were the Somali (69.54%), the Oromo (20.93%), and the Amhara (7.63%); all other ethnic groups made up the remaining 1.9% of the residents.
