= Gota =

Gota or Gøta or Göta may refer to:

== People ==
- Gotabaya Rajapaksa (born 1949), 8th President of Sri Lanka
- Gota Miura (三浦 豪太; born 1969), Japanese freestyle skier
- Gota Yashiki (born 1962), both an independent acid jazz artist and drum/bass player, as a member of the band Simply Red
- Gota Yamashita (born 1989), Japanese mixed martial artist

== Places ==
- Gota, Gujarat, a city in India
- Göta älv, a river in Sweden
- Gota, Guinea, a town in the Nzérékoré Prefecture, Guinea
- Gotha, Ethiopia, also known as Gota, a settlement in east-central Ethiopia
- Göta Canal, a waterway in Sweden
- Gota (Dârjov), a tributary of the river Dârjov in Olt County, Romania
- Göta, Sweden, locality situated in Västra Götaland County
- Norðragøta, also just referred to as Gøta, village on Eysturoy, Faroe Islands

== Names ==
- Göta, Swedish female name
- Gota Cola, a three piece band from Brisbane
- Göta Lejon, a theatre in Stockholm, Sweden, located in Södermalm
- Göta Ljungberg (1898–1955), major Swedish Wagnerian soprano of the 1920s
- Göta Anti-Aircraft Corps Commemorative Medal, a commemorative medal of the former Swedish Göta Anti-Aircraft Corps
- Göta Pettersson (1926–1993), Swedish gymnast and Olympic champion
- Göta älvbron, a bascule bridge in central Gothenburg, Sweden, carrying normal road vehicles and trams
- Göta Artillery Regiment, a Swedish Army artillery regiment that traced its origins back to the 17th century, disbanded in 1962
- Göta highway, an ancient road between Stockholm and the south of Sweden
- Göta Engineer Battalion, Swedish Army engineer regiment
- Göta Signal Battalion, Swedish Army signal regiment, disbanded in 1997
- GÍ Gøta, a former football club based in Gøta, in the Faroe Islands

== Other uses ==
- GoTa, "Global Open Trunking Architecture" a cellular-based digital trunking system
- Gota (embroidery), a type of Indian embroidery
- Gota (mixture), a digestive mixture of saunf, coconut and other spices
- Game of Thrones Ascent, a strategy video game

== See also ==
- Gotha (disambiguation)
