= Erer (disambiguation) =

Erer is a town in central Ethiopia.

It may also refer to:

- Erer (Harari woreda), a district in the Harari region of Ethiopia
- Erer (Somali woreda), a district in the Somali region of Ethiopia
- Erer River, a river in the eastern part of Ethiopia
- Erer Zone, a zone of Ethiopia
