= Gotha (disambiguation) =

Gotha is a town in Thuringia, Germany.

Gotha may also refer to:

== Places ==
- Gotha (district), in Thuringia, Germany
- Gotha, Ethiopia
- Gotha, Florida, a town in the United States
- Gotha, Minnesota, an unincorporated community in the United States
- Saxe-Gotha, a former Thuringian duchy
- Saxe-Gotha-Altenburg, a former Thuringian duchy
- Saxe-Coburg and Gotha, a former Thuringian duchy

== Other ==
- 1346 Gotha, a main belt asteroid
- Almanach de Gotha, an annual directory of European nobility
- Gotha (video game), a strategy game for Sega Saturn
- Gotha Observatory, astronomical observatory in Gotha, Germany
- Gothaer Waggonfabrik, a manufacturer of rolling stock, and formerly also aircraft; notably a series of World War I, heavy bombers
  - Gotha G.I
  - Gotha G.II
  - Gotha G.III
  - Gotha G.IV
  - Gotha G.V
- Gotha Raids, a name for the World War I air raids carried out against Great Britain using Gotha bombers
- Gotha Program (1875), party program for the creation of today's German Social Democratic Party (SPD)

== See also ==
- Gota (disambiguation)
