= Asbuli =

- Location in Ethiopia
- Coordinates: 9°58′N 41°09′E
- Country: Ethiopia
- Region: Somali
- Zone: Sitti Zone
- Elevation: 724 m (2,375 ft)

Population (2015)
  - Total: 1,700

Asbuli is a small town in north-eastern Ethiopia. It is located 82 km west of Shinile.
