= 2025 Shinile train collision =

Train collision in Ethiopia

2025 Ethiopia train collision

Details
- Date: 20 October 2025 c.2:00 a.m. EAT
- Location: Shinile, Somali Region
- Country: Ethiopia
- Line: Dire Dawa–Dewele railway line
- Operator: Ethio-Djibouti Railways
- Owner: Ethiopian Railways Corporation
- Incident type: Collision
- Cause: Poor maintenance and overloading of the passenger train (suspected)

Statistics
- Trains: 2 trains: A passenger train (Train No. 1209); A stationary train
- Deaths: 15
- Injured: 27-29

On 20 October 2025, a passenger train collided with a stationary train in Shinile near Dire Dawa, Ethiopia, killing 15 people and injuring dozens more. The accident was the deadliest train accident of 2025.

== Crash ==
At around 2:00 a.m., the passenger train derailed before colliding with the stationary train. Several carriages overturned while others were crushed. Many of the survivors were forced to jump out of windows. The train was travelling from Dewele to Dire Dawa carrying both passengers and cargo, such as rice, pasta and cooking oil. Most of the passengers consisted of young people and merchants.

== Victims ==
At least 15 people were killed and 27-29 others were injured. The exact number of injuries is unknown as reports claim different numbers. The condition of the injuries ranged from light to serious. All of the injured people were rescued and the bodies of the deceased victims were recovered from the scene.

== Investigation ==
An investigation into the cause of the crash was launched. District commissioner Jibril Omar said the cause of the crash appeared to be the poor condition of the passenger train, which was very old and unable to handle heavy loads. A major factor of the crash was the train being overloaded. Train collisions are relatively rare in the country.

== See also ==
- List of rail accidents (2020–present)
- Awash rail disaster
- 2025 Chhattisgarh train collision
- 2025 Chhattisgarh train collision
