= Ayesha (woreda) =

District in Somali Region, Ethiopia

Coordinates: 10°35′N 42°25′E

Ayesha (Italian Aiscia) is a woreda in Somali Region, Ethiopia. The northernmost woreda of the Shinile Zone, Ayesha is bordered on the south by Dembel, on the west by Shinile, on the north by Djibouti, on the east by Somaliland, and on the southeast by the Jijiga Zone. Towns in Ayesha include Ayesha, Dewele, Lasarat and Mermedebis.

The average elevation in this woreda is 766 meters above sea level. As of 2008, Ayesha has 180 kilometers of all-weather gravel road and 287.2 kilometers of community roads; about 20% of the total population has access to drinking water. The tracks of the Addis Ababa - Djibouti Railway and Ethio-Djibouti Railways cross this woreda, following the canyon cut by the Ayesha River in a southern direction, then turning southwest into Shinile just before reaching Adigale.

In mid April 2006, floods were reported to have displaced up to 3,000 people in Laserat. According to woreda officials, the floods destroyed more than 190 houses and killed as many as 500 head of livestock. The Ethiopian De-mining Office reported in November 2008 that it had cleared land mines planted in Ayesha as part of the four million square meters of land the office had cleared in the Somali Region.

== Demographics ==
Based on the 2017 Census conducted by the Central Statistical Agency of Ethiopia (CSA), this woreda has a total population of 75,215, of whom 39,089 are men and 36,126 women. While 10,726 are urban inhabitants, a further 64,489 were pastoralists.

Based on the 2007 Census conducted by the Central Statistical Agency of Ethiopia (CSA), this woreda has a total population of 58,086, of whom 31,241 are men and 26,845 women. While 7,970 or 13.72% are urban inhabitants, a further 37,339 or 64.28% are pastoralists. 96.3% of the population said they were Muslim, and 2.68% said they practiced Orthodox Christian.

The 1994 national census reported a total population for this woreda of 46,605, of whom 23,305 were men and 23,300 were women; 6,577 or 14.11% were urban inhabitants. The largest ethnic group reported in Ayesha was the Somali people of Issa inhabitants (95.99%).
