= Afdem (woreda) =

District in Somali Region, Ethiopia

Afdem Afdam
- woreda
- Interactive map of Afdem
- Coordinates: 10°15′N 41°10′E
- Country: Ethiopia
- Region: Somali
- Zone: Sitti

Population (2017)
  - Total: 84,395

Afdem (Somali: Afdam) is a woreda in Somali Region, Ethiopia. Located in the Sitti Zone, this woreda is bordered on the southwest by Mieso, on the north by the Afar Region and on the east by Erer, and on the south by the Oromia Region. The administrative center of this woreda is Afdem; other towns in Afdem include Ali jiir

The track of the Addis Ababa - Djibouti Railway crosses the southern part of this woreda along the lower slopes of the Amhar mountains. High peaks in Afdem include Mount Afdem (about 2000 meters).

== Demographics ==
Based on the 2017 Census conducted by the Central Statistical Agency of Ethiopia (CSA), this woreda has a total population of 84,395, of whom 41,618 are men and 42,777 women. While 12,505 are urban inhabitants, a further 71,890 were pastoralists.

Based on the 2007 Census conducted by the Central Statistical Agency of Ethiopia (CSA), this woreda has a total population of 65,031, of whom 33,246 are men and 31,785 women. While 9,286 or 14.28% are urban inhabitants, a further 49,776 or 76.54% are pastoralists. 98% of the population said they were Muslim, and 1.29% said they practiced Orthodox Christian. This woreda is primarily inhabited by the Issa clans of the Somali people.

The 1997 national census reported a total population for this woreda of 28,845 of whom 15,341 were men and 13,504 were women; 8,186 or 28.38% were urban inhabitants. The largest ethnic group reported in Shinile was the Somali people (94.3%).
