= Ayşegül =

- Pronunciation: [aːjʃeˈɟyl]
- Gender: Female
- Language: Turkish

Origin
- Meaning: life, womenly + smile/rose

Other names
- See also: Aisha

Ayşegül is a Turkish given name for females. The name is derived from "Ayşe", the Turkish form for the Arabic name Aisha, meaning "womenly, life" plus "Gül," a Persian word meaning rose."

Notable women named Ayşegül include:

== People ==
- Ayşegül Abadan (born 1980), Turkish pianist
- Ayşegül Acevit (born 1968), Turkish–German writer
- Ayşegül Aldinç (born 1957), Turkish singer and actress
- Ayşegül Behlivan (born 1989), Turkish Muay Thai and wushu practitioner.
- Ayşegül Çoban (born 1992), Turkish weightlifter
- Ayşegül Ergin (born 1971), Turkish Taekwondo practitioner
- Ayşegül Günay (born 1992), Turkish basketball player
- Ayşegül Karagöz (born 2010), Turkish darts player
- Ayşegül Pehlivanlar (born 1979), Turkish Paralympic sport shooter
- Ayşegül Savaş (born 1986), Turkish-American writer

== Other use ==
- MV Karadeniz Powership Ayşegül Sultan, Liberia-flagged Turkish powership
