= Aydora =

- Location within Ethiopia
- Coordinates: 9°51′33″N 41°22′10″E
- Country: Ethiopia
- Region: Somali
- Zone: Shinile
- Elevation: 795 m (2,608 ft)

Population (2005)
  - Total: 2,168
- Time zone: UTC+3 (EAT)

Aydora is a town in central Ethiopia of the Somali Region in the Shinile Zone.

== Demographics ==
The 2005 census reported this town had a total population of 2,168 of whom 1,163 were men and 1,005 women. The ethnic groups reported in this town were the Horoone, Reere Muuse (99.00%) all other ethnic groups made up the remaining 0.99% of the residents.
