= Hurso =

Town in Somali, Ethiopia

- Location within Ethiopia
- Coordinates: 9°34′N 41°23′E
- Country: Ethiopia
- Region: Somali
- Zone: Shinile
- Woreda: Erer
- Elevation: 1,130 m (3,710 ft)

Population (2005)
  - Total: 3,318
- Time zone: UTC+3 (EAT)

Hurso (Somali language: Huursoo) is a town in eastern Ethiopia. Located in the Shinile Zone of the Somali Region about 40 km west of Dire Dawa, it has a longitude and latitude of 9°36′N 41°38′E and an altitude of 1130 meters above sea level. It is one of four towns in Erer woreda.

Hurso was served by a station on the Ethio-Djibouti Railways. South of the town is Camp Hurso, where members of the 294th Infantry Regiment, Guam Army National Guard, U.S. Army, spent a year training soldiers of the Ethiopian National Defense Force in 2006.

Hurso was where the founding meeting of the Ethiopian Somali Democratic League was held, under the sponsorship of the Ethiopian People's Revolutionary Democratic Front and the leadership of the two Somali members of the federal cabinet, Federal Minister Abdul Mejid Hussein and Federal Vice-Minister Samsudin Ahmed.

== History ==
Hurso, in eastern Ethiopia, is home to about 5,000 Somali of the Gurgura clan, formerly fruit farmers and agropastoralists. Hurso's lands were seized by the Derg, the Marxist government of Mengistu Haile Mariam, which ruled Ethiopia from 1974 to 1991 in the aftermath of the 1977-78 Ogaden War. In this war, Somalia unsuccessfully attempted to annex the ethnically Somali lands of Ethiopia. These lands consisted of the semi-arid Ogaden, the rich pastures of the Haud, and other lowlands off the eastern edge of the Ethiopian highlands.

Hurso is now known (if it is known at all), as the site of a large military training center of the newly refederated Ethiopia. It is remembered by its inhabitants as an almost heavenly place of permanent water, good grazing, and bountiful orchards. Today, it is a desolate stop on the railway from Addis Ababa to Djibouti, where people eke out an existence gathering and selling firewood (considered one step above begging), running tiny shops and teahouses, and selling meager amounts of onions, potatoes, and bananas. According to one elder:

"Hurso was a big village, with many, many kinds of fruit -- lemons, oranges, papayas, mangos. We have a proverb: `Hurso-the Rome of the Gurgura.' Today the people are returnees and refugees. Women sell firewood. The life of the children is so hard. I was born here and lived 25 years before I left here. Today I see only empty land."

The story of Hurso, then, is a love story as well as a story of injustice. The Hurso Somali were ejected from their land during the war. They returned as refugees, their lands still in the hands of the Ministry of Defense. They survive, but are far from what they consider to be a decent, human life. Development projects and development rhetoric are important ways of coping, but the fundamental problem, in their eyes, is not a question of charity, but of simple justice.

The story of the peoples' flight and return was told by men, women, elders, as well as youth who had been infants at the time. Most villagers fled into the surrounding country side during the Ogaden War and then returned to their lands. In the aftermath of the war, the Ethiopian government decided to expand the military base near the village and began to expropriate farmlands. Some families were offered compensatory lands in Sodere, hundreds of kilometers away, but the majority refused to leave. One day, the military arrived and surrounded the villagers. They were told to evacuate within 12 hours. Bulldozers arrived and destroyed homes and shops. People fled, some to Djibouti, others to Somalia, depending on their contacts and available transportation at crossroads towns. A few stayed in the area and lived in the scrub forest or stayed with pastoralist kin. These individuals would return to their lands and attempt to farm them. They were repeatedly beaten until, according to the villagers, the army concluded these individuals were mad and harmless. A few families were allowed to stay to service the military base and the train that stops in the village; these faced very strict controls on travel, visiting, and other activities between 1979 and 1991. The majority fled to Djibouti, where they stayed in UNHCR (United Nations High Commissioner for Refugees) camps.

Beginning in 1986, there was increasing pressure from the Djibouti government for Ethiopian refugees to leave the country, or at least the camps, as food aid from overseas had decreased dramatically. Some Hurso residents returned to Ethiopia in 1988, but the majority stayed in Djibouti, either in the capital, Djiboutiville, or in the border area with Ethiopia. When the Derg fell in 1991, they hoped the lands would be returned. Tens of thousands of Ethiopians, including some Hurso residents, stayed in Djibouti until a final repatriation program was completed in 1996.

According to Gurgura tradition, firm claims to farming lands can be established on two grounds: traditional use over several generations and cultivation by individuals or lineages. This method of claiming land corresponds to the Somali, whose traditional use of lands for grazing and as a source of water are the two main sources of legitimate claims to territory. The lands around the village of Hurso are claimed by the Gurgura on several grounds: traditional use over at least seven generations, grants by various Ethiopian and Italian governments, military conquest, and extensive planting of mango, citrus, papaya, and other fruit orchards. The farms were held by families, although the individual whose name is mentioned as `owner' of the larger farms or gardens, are trustees of land considered to be available for the subsistence purposes of extended families or entire lineages.

People speak of the land as if they still own it; "This is Ahmed's garden;" "This is Amina's garden." Although the lands were taken almost 20 years ago, the community is still intensely loyal and passionate about them. People cling to the lands both because they are good, fertile lands, and because they still consider them to be their lands. Until there is an option for creating ties to other lands or other livelihoods, both identity as well as survival are associated to them. I asked dozens of people why they had returned to Hurso. People patiently told me that the government had changed and they were promised the lands would be returned; there was no longer a way to make a living in Djibouti and lands surrounding Hurso could not support a significantly larger population -- the land looks empty, but is in fact, full to its carrying capacity. Also, the original owners of the lands near Sodere (where some Hurso residents had been resettled) had returned after the fall of the Derg and had thrown out the resettled Hurso families. One man was less patient:

Q: "Why did you return to Hurso?"

A: "What do you mean? Isn't this my soil?"

== Demographics ==
The town's inhabitants are Gacalwaaq, subclan of the Gurgura Madaxweyne Dir who mostly speak Somali and some Oromo. As of recent, due to severe droughts in the region some of the neighbouring issa people have come to or near the town for farming or to graze their livestock. Based on figures from the Central Statistical Agency of Ethiopia published in 2005, Erer has an estimated total population of 3,318 of whom 1,695 are men and 1,623 women. The 1997 census reported this town had a total population of 2,226 of whom 1,120 were men and 1,106 women. The three largest ethnic groups reported in this town were the Gurgura (Somali) (59.88%), the Oromo (22.46%), and the Amhara (11.99%); all other ethnic groups made up the remaining 5.67% of the residents.
