= Melik Toğrul Arslan =

Toğrul Arslan
- Sultan of Melitene

Sultan of Rum in Melitene
- Reign: 1107–1119 or 1124
- Predecessor: Kilij Arslan I
- Successor: Malik Shah or Mesud I
- Born: after 1092
- Died: before 1129
- Dynasty: Seljuk dynasty
- Father: Kilij Arslan I Balak (adoptive)
- Mother: Ayse Hatun
- Religion: Islam

Tughrul-Arslan bin Kilij-Arslan (Turkish: Tuğrul Arslan; died no earlier than 1129) was a member of the Anatolian branch of the Seljuk dynasty and the youngest son of the Sultan of Rum, Kilij Arslan I; following his father's death in 1107, he was taken by his mother to Melitene, where he was proclaimed sultan.

With the help of his mother's husband, Balak bin Bahram, Toghrul-Arslan expanded his territories by annexing the provinces of Khanzit and Jahan. Balak's death in 1124 left Toghrul-Arslan without support. In the summer of 1124, the Danishmendids and Toghrul-Arslan's brother, Mesud I, besieged Melitene. In December 1124, Toghrul-Arslan fled the city, bringing his reign to an end.

== Biography ==
=== Origin ===
Toghrul-Arslan was the youngest of the five sons of the Sultan of Rum, Kilij Arslan I, and belonged to the Anatolian branch of the Seljuk dynasty. His mother was Aisha Khatun, who was presumably the daughter of the Seljuk ruler of Smyrna, Chaka Bey.

=== Reign in Melitene ===
Sultan Kilij Arslan I captured Melitene from the Danishmendids on September 2, 1106, and possibly granted it as an appanage to his younger son, Tughrul Arslan. The following year, Tughrul Arslan, along with his mother and his elder brother Melik-Shah, accompanied Kilij Arslan on a campaign against the emir Jawali (Chavli) who had been appointed atabeg (ruler) of Mosul and al-Jazira by the Seljuk Sultan, Muhammad Tapar. Kilij Arslan I entered Mosul on March 22, 1107, at the invitation of the inhabitants, who did not wish to accept Jawali as their ruler due to rumors of his cruelty.

This lead Javali to retreat. Kilij Arslan I left a small garrison in Mosul and appointed Melik-Shah as his deputy, while designating one of his commanders, the emir Bozmysh, as Melik-Shah’s atabeg (tutor).Il-Ghazi, the Artuqid ruler of Mardin, and Ridwan, the atabeg of Aleppo who opposed Kilij Arslan’s dominance in the Jazira and Northern Syria joined forces with Jawali against him and captured al-Rahba on May 19, 1107. Upon hearing this, Kilij Arslan decided to march against them.

However, although the sultan had decided to fight, he did not have his entire army with him. The troops he had dispatched to aid Emperor Alexios I Komnenos who was fighting Bohemond in the Balkans had not yet returned. Without waiting for these reinforcements, the sultan engaged in battle on the banks of the Khabur River. When the Anatolian emirs in Kilij Arslan’s army saw the imposing size of Jawali’s forces, they decided against taking the risk and retreated, abandoning the sultan. On July 13, 1107, seizing upon the weakened state of Kilij Arslan’s forces, Jawali immediately launched an attack. Kilij Arslan realized that victory was impossible. To avoid capture, he spurred his horse into the waters of the Khabur River, intending to cross to the opposite bank; however, weighed down by his armor, he drowned along with his horse. After the death of Kilij Arslan, the emir Bozmysh took the sultan's wife and his young son, Tughril Arslan, and brought them to Melitene. Meanwhile, Malik-Shah was captured by Jawali and sent as a prisoner to Isfahan, to Sultan Muhammad Tapar. Sibt ibn al-Jawzi claimed that another of Tughril Arslan's brothers, Masud, was likewise sent to Isfahan..

The unexpected death of Sultan Kilij Arslan I and the capture of his eldest sons precipitated a succession crisis in the Sultanate of Rum. Ayşe Hatun and the emir Bozmuş proclaimed Tughril Arslan sultan in Melitene. Ayşe was the de facto ruler, supported by Bozmuş, but before long, a rift developed between them. Ayşe Hatun conspired with Il-Arslan, a Seljuk emir in Melitene; Il-Arslan killed Bozmuş and married Ayşe Hatun. However, the populace was dissatisfied with him. Having amassed a large quantity of gold through plunder, he intended to flee with it. Tughril Arslan and Ayşe imprisoned him just as he was preparing to depart for Iconium, and announced his execution to appease the people. After keeping him in prison for a year, Ayşe sent him to the Great Seljuk Sultan Muhammad Tapar to secure the support of the Great Seljuks and legitimize her son's rule.

Barhebraeus and Michael the Syrian referred to Toghrul-Arslan as the Sultan of Melitene. According to the medievalist Songül Mecit, “it is evident that Melitene became an independent Seljuk state that continued to exist, likely until 1119.”.

Some time later, Melik-Shah arrived in Melitene. According to Barhebraeus, Melik-Shah deposed Tughril-Arslan and reigned as sultan in Melitene until Mesud ascended the throne. Melik-Shah stayed in Melitene for a time before departing for Konya. After imprisoning his other brothers, Mesud and Arab, he was enthroned in Konya in 1110.

=== Balak ===
The sons of Kilij Arslan fought among themselves "almost ceaselessly," which emboldened the Crusaders. Bohemond seized the Jihan region (on the right bank of the Euphrates) and the environs of Melitene.Toghrul-Arslan’s mother sought an ally, as Masud—the son of Kilij-Arslan—had established himself on the throne and had already blinded Melik-Shah. According to Michael the Syrian, in 1113 she went to Balak, who had already gained renown, and proposed that he become her husband.She reportedly said: "The Sultan (Kilij Arslan) has often praised you, saying that among all the Turkish emirs, there is none as intelligent and powerful as Balak. And I want you to protect me and my children." Balak married Aisha and took her and her children under his protection. They returned to Melitene and deposed the atabeg; Balak himself became the new atabeg for Tughril-Arslan..

Having established himself in Melitene, Balak began acting on behalf of Toghrul Arslan. He pressured Mehmed Chubuk-oghlu to sell Khanzit a region on the left bank of the Euphrates to Toghrul Arslan. Mehmed offered gold and several territories in exchange for Kharput. Balak and Toghrul Arslan accepted these terms, yet some time later, Balak attempted to seize the city. He was thwarted only by the arrival of Sultan Muhammad Tapar’s army, which had been dispatched to fight the Crusaders in 1114). However, in 1115, that army was defeated by the forces of the Artuqids (Balak and Il-Ghazi). Seizing the opportunity, Balak immediately captured Kharput and made it the center of his beylik..

In 1119, Toghrul-Arslan, who was under the protection of Balak, seized the province of Jahan from the Armenian vassals of the Count of Edessa but in response, the Crusaders ravaged the region of Melitene. Toghrul Arslan and Balak marched against Ishaq Mengujek-oglu and captured Kemakh. Ishaq fled to Trebizond to the dux Constantine Gabras. Toghrul Arslan and Balak formed an alliance with Gümüştekin Ghazi. Gabras and Ishaq Bey were defeated and taken prisoner. Gabras was released for a ransom of 30,000 dinars, whereas Gümüştekin Ghazi freed Ishaq without a ransom because he was his son-in-law. This caused a rift between him and Balak, and the alliance collapsed.

Balak fought against the Armenians of Gerger, who were raiding Melitene, Kharput, and Palu. In 1121, he forced them to relocate to Khanzit and swear never to return to Gerger. After they broke their oath and returned to Gerger, he burned their villages.

=== End of the reign ===
In 1124, Balak died during the siege of Manbij.

Toghrul Arslan believed he had a right to his inheritance, as he was Balak’s adopted son and Balak had no other sons. He occupied Masara (Minshar)and Gerger.

Toghrul Arslan may have participated in the Siege of Aleppo (1124–1125) in alliance with Baldwin and Joscelin. Smbat Sparapet wrote that "leaders of the Arab forces, the grandson of Ddush, the ruler of Melitene, and the son of Kilij Arslan came to Joscelin's aid."

But with Balak's death Tughrul-Arslan lost most of his support. This marked a turning point in his reign and paved the way for the end of his rule. The Sultan's weakened position in Melitene emboldened the Danishmendids, from whom Kilij Arslan I had taken the city from eighteen years earlier. On June 13, 1124, Melik Ghazi marched on Melitene alongside his son-in-law, the Seljuk Sultan Mesud I, and laid siege to the city. Although Mesud had previously left Tughrul-Arslan in peace, he wished to assist his father-in-law, with whose support he had ascended the Seljuk throne. Ghazi besieged the city for a month before leaving his son Muhammad to continue the siege while he himself returned to Sivas. Muhammad maintained the siege for another six months. A severe famine plagued the city. Bread prices soared, yet even at those rates, it was hard to come by. People ate cats, dogs, and donkeys—consuming not only the meat but the hides as well. According to the Anonymous Syriac Chronicle, an epidemic of plague broke out in Melitene during the siege. Faced with a desperate situation, Aisha Khatun and Tughrul-Arslan turned to the Crusaders for help, but the Crusaders were occupied with the siege of Aleppo.. *

Toghrul-Arslan did not receive the aid he had expected; his mother, Aisha-Khatun, imprisoned all the city's nobles and wealthy citizens. They were tortured to extract the gold with which Aisha-Khatun intended to flee the city. On December 10, 1124, Aisha Khatun and Tughrul-Arslan secretly fled the city and took refuge in the fortress of Minshar (Masara) near Melitene. After Tughrul-Arslan and his mother left Melitene, the people opened the city gates and surrendered Melitene to Muhammad..

=== Final years ===
After capturing Melitene, Sultan Mesud left the city to his father-in-law, Melik Ghazi. Arab the brother of Mesud and Tughrul Arslan, who ruled Kastamonu and Çankırı viewed this as an act of betrayal, since their father, Kilij Arslan, had originally seized the city from the Danishmendids. Consequently, Arab waged war against Mesud and Ghazi (1126–1127); Tughrul Arslan fought alongside him. According to Barhebraeus, in 1128 Toghrul Arslan raided Melitene, but he was unable to enter the city and merely plundered its environs..

Michael the Syrian and Barhebraeus say that no further information regarding Toghrul-Arslan appear after this; however, Ibn al-Azraq maintained that the former ruler of Melitene had gone to Hisn Kayfa to join his father-in-law, Rukn al-Dawla Da'ud who was married to his mother, Aisha-Khatun. In 1129, Toghrul-Arslan traveled with Da'ud to Mayyafariqin for the funeral of his sister, Sayida-Khatun, who was interred in the tomb of their father, Kilij Arslan I. Toghrul-Arslan inherited his sister's estate and lived in Mayyafariqin for a time before departing. Thereafter, the name Toghrul-Arslan does not appear in the sources.

== Literature ==
- Alptekin, C. (1992). "Belek b. Behrâm". Islam Ansiklopedisi (in Turkish). Vol. 5. pp. 402–403.
- Bar Hebraeus (1932). Chronography. Translated by E. A. Wallis Budge. London.
- Cahen, Claude (1986). "Balak". In Gibb, H. A. R.; Kramers, J. H.; Lévi-Provençal, E.; Schacht, J.; Lewis, B. & Pellat, Ch. (eds.). The Encyclopaedia of Islam, Second Edition. Volume I: A–B. Leiden: E. J. Brill. OCLC 495469456.
- Demirkent, I. (2002). "KILICARSLAN I" (PDF). TDV İslâm Ansiklopedisi (in Turkish). 25. Ankara: 396–399.
- Guseinov, R. A. (1979). Из «Хроники» Михаила Сирийца (часть 1) [From the “Chronicle” of Mikhail the Syrian (part 1)] (PDF). Письменные памятники Востока. Историко-филологические исследования (Yearbook) (in Russian). 1973. Moscow: Nauka: 26–54.
- Hillenbrand, Carole (1979). The history of the Jazira 1100-1150: the contribution of Ibn Al-Azraq al-Fariqi (PhD thesis). University of Edinburgh.
- Kesik, M. (2020). "Melik Muhammed (1134—1142)". Selçuklu Araştırmaları Dergisi (in Turkish) (12). Konya: 11–34. ISSN 2548-0154.
- Kesik, M. (2004). "Melikşah" (PDF). TDV İslâm Ansiklopedisi (in Turkish). Vol. 29. Ankara. pp. 58–59.
- Mecit, S. (2013). The Rum Seljuqs: Evolution of a Dynasty. Milton Park, Abingdon, Oxon: Routledge. ISBN 978-1-134-50899-0.
- Metin, T. (2017). "Sultanlığı Meşruiyet Kazanmamış Bir Selçuklu Şehzadesi: Tuğrul Arslan". Selçuklu Araştırmaları Dergisi (in Turkish) (6). Konya: 35–52. ISSN 2548-0154.
- Michel le Syrien (1905). J.B. Chabot (ed.). Chronique de Michel le Syrien. Paris: Roger Pearse.
- Smbat Sparapet (1974). Летопись [Chronicle] (in Russian). Erevan: National Academy of Sciences of the Republic of Armenia (Hayastan).
- Thierry, M. (1993). "Monuments chrétiens inédits de Haute-Mésopotamie". Syria. Archéologie, Art et histoire. 70 (1): 179–204. doi:10.3406/syria.1993.7323.
