= Mulu, Ethiopia =

Mulu
- Town
- Location in Ethiopia
- Coordinates: 9°17′N 40°50′E
- Country: Ethiopia
- Region: Somali
- Zone: Sitti Zone
- Elevation: 1,257 m (4,124 ft)

Mulu is a town in eastern Ethiopia, located in the Sitti Zone of the Somali Regional State. It is the main town of Mieso district. Mulu is served by a station on the Addis Ababa-Djibouti railroad.

The missionaries Carl Wilhelm Isenberg and Johann Ludwig Krapf paused for several days at Mulu, during their 1839 journey from the coast to Shewa, and described it as "nothing but a vast plain covered with stones, with a little verdure in patches, a few acacias, and hovels made of boughs here and there".

Based on figures from the Central Statistical Agency in 2005, Mulu has an estimated total population of 30,812, of whom 17,991 are men and 12,821 are women. The 1994 census did not provide separate figures for this town.

== Demographics ==
This town is inhabited by the Somali people, from the Jidle and Gaaljecel sub-clans of the Hawiye clan.
