= Aysha, Ethiopia =

Aysha Ayshaca
- Location in Ethiopia
- Coordinates: 10°45′N 42°34′E
- Country: Ethiopia
- Region: Somali
- Zone: Sitti Zone
- Elevation: 730 m (2,400 ft)

Population (2015)
  - Total: 234,501

Aysha (Somali: Ayshaca, Arabic: عائشة, Amharic: አኢሻ) is a town in Ethiopia. It is situated about (46 kilometres or 29 miles) south of the border with Djibouti and (20 kilometres or 12 miles) west of the border with Somaliland. Located in the Sitti Zone in the Somali Region. This town served by a station on the Addis Ababa - Djibouti Railway.

== Overview ==
Nearby towns and villages include Hadhagaala (33 kilometres or 21 miles), Dewele (39 kilometres or 24 miles), Guelile (46 kilometres or 29 miles), Ali Sabieh (57 kilometres or 35 miles) and Dire Dawa (171 kilometres or 106 miles).

== Massacre ==
The Aysha massacre was a massacre of ethnic Issa Somalis by Ethiopian army on 13 August 1960 in Aysha, Ethiopia. The Ethiopian troops had descended on the area reportedly to help defuse clan-related conflict. However, according to eye-witness testimony, that Somali men were then taken to a different location and then executed by Ethiopian soldiers. Among the latter, those who fled to Dikhil and Ali Sabieh in Djibouti.

== Climate ==
Aysha has a hot desert climate (BWh) in Köppen-Geiger system.

Climate data for Aysha
Month	Jan	Feb	Mar	Apr	May	Jun	Jul	Aug	Sep	Oct	Nov	Dec	Year
Mean daily maximum °C (°F)	25.6 (78.1)	28.0 (82.4)	30.2 (86.4)	32.1 (89.8)	34.9 (94.8)	37.3 (99.1)	36.7 (98.1)	35.7 (96.3)	34.8 (94.6)	32.2 (90.0)	27.5 (81.5)	26.0 (78.8)	31.8 (89.2)
Mean daily minimum °C (°F)	16.0 (60.8)	18.4 (65.1)	20.1 (68.2)	22.2 (72.0)	24.4 (75.9)	26.6 (79.9)	24.9 (76.8)	24.3 (75.7)	25.1 (77.2)	21.2 (70.2)	18.4 (65.1)	17.0 (62.6)	21.6 (70.8)
Average rainfall mm (inches)	10 (0.4)	10 (0.4)	16 (0.6)	30 (1.2)	15 (0.6)	7 (0.3)	32 (1.3)	50 (2.0)	35 (1.4)	8 (0.3)	7 (0.3)	3 (0.1)	223 (8.9)
Source: Climate-Data.org, altitude: 730m
