= Milo, Ethiopia =

Milo
- Location in Ethiopia
- Coordinates: 10°03′N 42°03′E
- Country: Ethiopia
- Region: Somali
- Zone: Shinile
- Elevation: 730 m (2,400 ft)

Milo (also transliterated Mello) is a town in eastern Ethiopia. Located in the Shinile Zone of the Somali Region. This town is served by a station on the Ethio-Djibouti Railways.

== Demographics ==
The town's inhabitants belong to various mainly Afro-Asiatic-speaking ethnic groups, with the Issa Somali predominant. Based on figures from the Central Statistical Agency in 2005, Milo has an estimated total population of 2,173, of whom 1,114 are men and 1,059 are women. The 1997 census reported this town had a total population of 1,458 of whom 736 were men and 722 women. The two largest ethnic groups reported in this town were the Somali (98.42%), and the Amhara (0.75%); all other ethnic groups made up the remaining 0.83% of the residents. It is one of four towns in Shinile woreda.
