= Railway stations in Ethiopia =

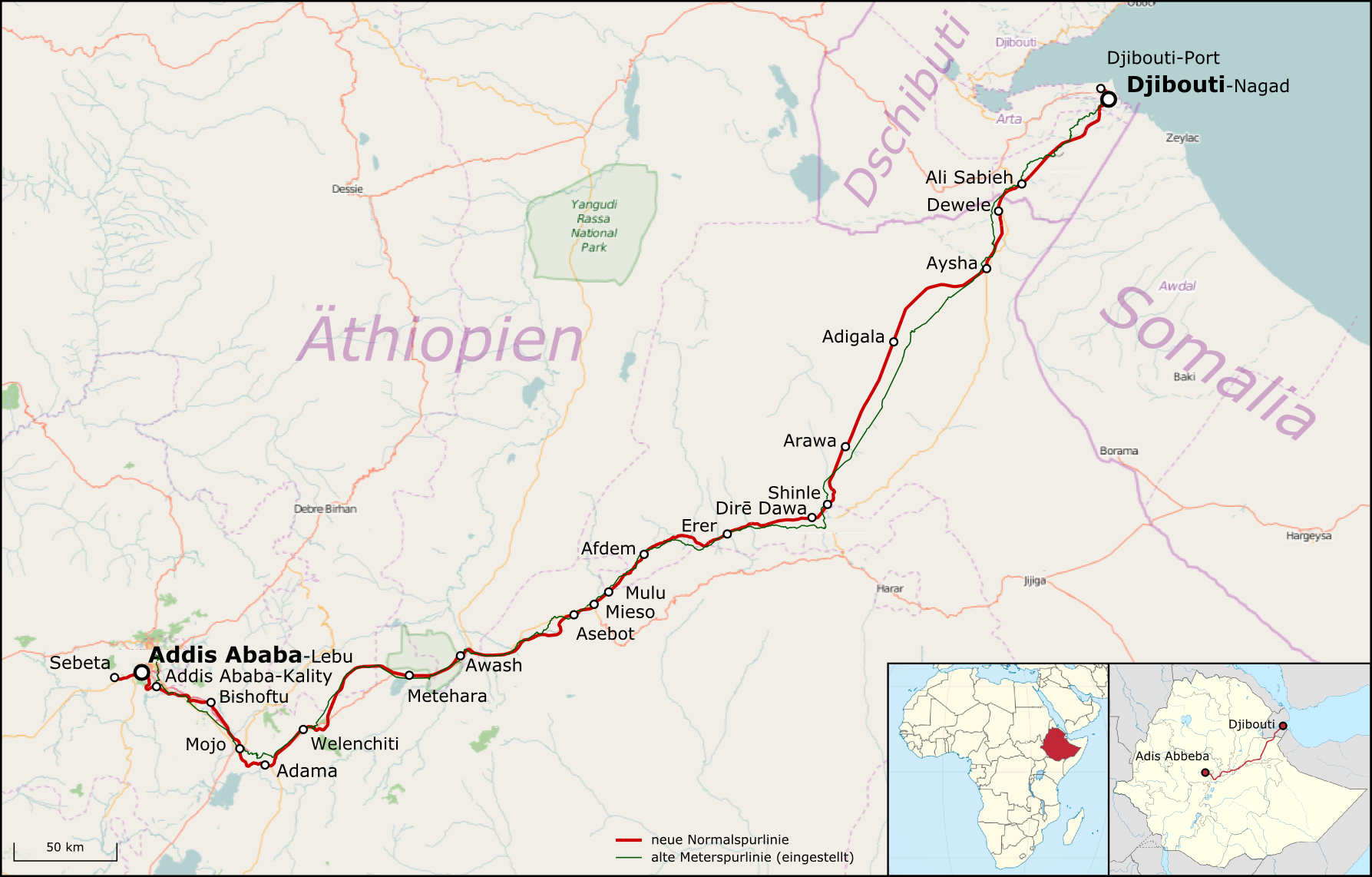
Comparison Old metre gauge line New standard gauge line

Current railway stations in Ethiopia are served by standard gauge railways of the National Railway Network of Ethiopia which is mostly under construction, except the Addis Ababa–Djibouti Railway. Other stations were built for the in 2018 still operating metre gauge Ethio-Djibouti Railways, although this railway has officially been superseded by the new Addis Ababa-Djibouti Railway.

The following list contains dedicated railway stations with at least a single platform for passengers to enter or to leave trains. Train stops on open stretches without platform can outnumber train stops in railway stations by a 2:1 margin, but the former are not included in the lists. The railways usually also have a number of freight yards and dry ports for freight handling, but these are not counted as well.

== Standard gauge railways ==
=== Description of railway stations ===
Railway stations mostly have a single platform for passengers to enter or to leave trains. These platforms allow access without having the need to use stairs. Some have two platforms connected through a footbridge above the overhead catenary system. The platforms are roofed to protect passengers against sun, wind and rain. Railway stations for passenger trains always have a station building directly attached to the back of the principal platform. Consequently, all railway stations with a single platform have space for only one platform line and do not allow the presence of more than one train at the platform at the same time. In contrast, railway stations with two platforms have the space for two or three platform lines. All platforms are around 330 meters long.

The station buildings are used for ticketing and for refreshments and contain waiting rooms and even rooms for prayers. They have media available (at least electricity, water). The outer appearance of station buildings of the Addis Ababa–Djibouti Railway shows some sort of architectural eclecticism including Ethiopian elements with some Chinese interpretation and rounded elements. The railway station buildings on the Awash–Hara Gebeya Railway are rather functional and rectangular.

The stations on the Addis Ababa–Djibouti Railway were built in 2015 and 2016, the stations on the Awash–Hara Gebeya Railway were built in 2017 and 2018 for the section between Awash and Kombolcha. For the sections between Kombolcha and Hara Gebeya and between Hara Gebeya and Mek'ele, all stations are planned. No clear date for building them is known.

In the following, most stations are coined [sic] closed, these do exist but there is no use by passengers yet (train stations would be operational but there are no scheduled passenger services yet). Some stations are called U/C, meaning under construction, others are planned and do not exist up to now. In total, there are 36 railway stations (existing, under construction and planned).

=== List of railway stations ===
==== Passenger railway stations ====
The stations below are passenger railway stations on operational railways and on railways currently under construction. Some of them are "open" (means, they see passengers), some of them are "closed" (means they are ready for service but not in use for the moment.

Other railway stations are under construction ("U/C") or are "planned" (while the railway is under construction already).

Standard gauge passenger railway stations in Ethiopia
Station	Railway	Platforms	platform length [m]	Status	Image	Remarks
Adama	Addis Ababa–Djibouti	1	400	open		also freight
Addis Ababa – Indode	Addis Ababa–Djibouti	1		closed		mainly freight
Addis Ababa – Furi-Labu	Addis Ababa–Djibouti	2	400 + 400	open		Addis Ababa Main Station
Adi Gudem	Hara Gebeya–Mek'ele	1		planned		
Alamata	Hara Gebeya–Mek'ele	1		planned		
Amibara	Awash–Hara Gebeya	1		U/C		
Awash	Addis Ababa–Djibouti; Awash–Hara Gebeya	3		U/C		Junction of two lines also freight
Bike	Addis Ababa–Djibouti	1	200	closed		also freight
Bishoftu	Addis Ababa–Djibouti	1	200	closed		
Dewale	Addis Ababa–Djibouti	2	300 + 300	closed		also freight; platforms separated by 1 km down the line
Dirē Dawa	Addis Ababa–Djibouti	1	400	open		also freight
Feto	Addis Ababa–Djibouti	1	200	closed		
Hara Gebeya	Awash–Hara Gebeya; Hara Gebeya–Mek'ele	1		planned		future junction
Hayk	Awash–Hara Gebeya	2		planned		
Karakore	Awash–Hara Gebeya	1		U/C		
Kobo	Hara Gebeya–Mek'ele	1		planned		
Kombolcha	Awash–Hara Gebeya	2		U/C		
Megale	Hara Gebeya–Mek'ele	1		planned		
Mehoni	Hara Gebeya–Mek'ele	1		planned		
Mek'ele Airport	Hara Gebeya–Mek'ele	1		planned		
Mekoy	Awash–Hara Gebeya	1		U/C		
Mersa	Awash–Hara Gebeya	1		planned		
Metehara	Addis Ababa–Djibouti	1	200	closed		
Mieso	Addis Ababa–Djibouti	1	200	closed		
Modjo	Addis Ababa–Djibouti	1	300	closed		freight for Modjo Dry Port
Sebeta	Addis Ababa–Djibouti	1	200	closed		
Sembeta	Awash–Hara Gebeya	1		U/C		
Shewa Robit	Awash–Hara Gebeya	2		U/C		

==== Railways in planning stage ====
The railway stations provided below are for planned railways. As these railways are in planning stage, the stations and station names are very preliminary and subject to change.

Standard gauge passenger railway stations in Ethiopia in planning stage
Station	Railway	Platforms	Status	Image	Remarks
Axum	Mekele-Shire	1	Planned		
Shire	Mekele-Shire	2	Planned		
Hara Gebeya	Hara Gebeya-Metema	1	Planned		Junction
Wereta	Hara Gebeya-Metema	1	Planned		Future junction
* Bahir Dar	Hara Gebeya-Metema	1	Planned		
* Finote Selam	Hara Gebeya-Metema	1	Planned		Future branch terminus
Azezo	Hara Gebeya-Metema	1	Planned		
Aykal	Hara Gebeya-Metema	1	Planned		
Genda Wuha	Hara Gebeya-Metema	1	Planned		
Metema	Hara Gebeya-Metema	1 ?	Planned		near Sudan border
Hara Gebeya	Hara Gebeya-Port Tadjoura	2	Planned		Junction future North-Eastern Line
Semera	Hara Gebeya-Port Tadjoura	1	Planned		
Dichoto	Hara Gebeya-Port Tadjoura	1	Planned		
Elidar	Hara Gebeya-Port Tadjoura	1	Planned		ET-DJ Border
Tadjoura	Hara Gebeya-Port Tadjoura	1 ?	Planned		Port in northern Djibouti.
Sebeta	Sebeta-Kurmuk	1	Planned		Planned Junction; Western Line
Ambo	Sebeta-Kurmuk	1	Planned		
Ejaji	Sebeta-Kurmuk	1	Planned		Future Junction South-western line
Nekemte	Sebeta-Kurmuk	1	Planned		
Nejo	Sebeta-Kurmuk	1	Planned		
Asosa	Sebeta-Kurmuk	1	Planned		
Kurmuk	Sebeta-Kurmuk	1 ?	Planned		Near Sudan Border
Ejaji	Ejaji-Dima	1 ?	Planned		Future junction South-Western line
Seka	Ejaji-Dima	1	Planned		
Jimma	Ejaji-Dima	1	Planned		Intermediate junction
* Bedele	Ejaji-Dima	1	Planned		Intermediate terminus
Tepi	Ejaji-Dima	1	Planned		
Dima	Ejaji-Dima	1 ?	Planned		Near South Sudan Border
Boma, South Sudan	Ejaji-Dima	1 ?	Planned		Across South Sudan border
Modjo	Modjo-Moyale	1 ?	Planned		Future Junction; Southern line
Ziway	Modjo-Moyale	1	Planned		
Shashemene	Modjo-Moyale	1	Planned		Intermediate Junction
* Hawassa	Modjo-Moyale	1	Planned		Intermediate Terminus
Soddo	Modjo-Moyale	1	Planned		
Arba Minch	Modjo-Moyale	1	Planned		
Konso	Modjo-Moyale	1	Planned		Intermediate Junction
* Weyto	Modjo-Moyale	1	Planned		Intermediate Terminus
Tabelo	Modjo-Moyale	1	Planned		
Mega	Modjo-Moyale	1	Planned		
Ziway	Modjo-Moyale	1	Planned		
Moyale	Modjo-Moyale	1 ?	Planned		Near Kenya Border
Adama	Adama-Ginir	1 ?	Planned		Future junction SouthEastern line
Keya	Adama-Ginir	1 ?	Planned		Future intermediate junction
* Asella	Adama-Ginir	1 ?	Planned		Future intermediate terminus
Robe	Adama-Ginir	1	Planned		
Indeto	Adama-Ginir	1 ?	Planned		
Gasera	Adama-Ginir	1 ?	Planned		
Ginir	Adama-Ginir	1 ?	Planned		Future terminus Desert separates Somalia

== Metre gauge railway ==
The metre gauge Ethio-Djibouti Railway was built between 1898-1917. Railway station buildings were built in part later, in part never. Only the two main cities along the line (Addis Ababa, Dire Dawa) saw bigger and dedicated station buildings with platforms. Most railway stations were composed of very simple single-room buildings, sometimes open without walls, sometimes closed, sometimes like goats sheds. No platforms.

Three types of railway stations exist: open, abandoned and defunct. The latter still exist while the status of abandoned railway stations is uncertain. Maybe they were totally demolished, maybe not. There are also some open railway stations, as the metre gauge railway still operates in 2018 with passenger services.

=== Main stations ===
Station	built	Status	Image
Dire Dawa	1902 / 1910	open	-
Addis Ababa	1917 / 1929	defunct	-

=== Other stations ===
List of other metre gauge passenger railway stations in Ethiopia
Station	built	Status	Image
Shinile		open	
El Bah		open	
Harewa		open	
Milo		open	
Adigale		open	
Lasarat		open	
Ayesha		open	
Adele		open	
Dewele		open	
Akaka Beseka		abandoned	
Bishoftu		abandoned	
Mojo		abandoned	
Adama		abandoned	
Welenchiti		abandoned	
Borchotto		abandoned	
Malka Jilo		abandoned	
Metehara		abandoned	
Awash		abandoned	
Arba Bordode		abandoned	
Kora		abandoned	
Asabot		abandoned	
Mieso		defunct	
Mulu		defunct	
Afdem		defunct	
Bike		defunct	
Gotha		defunct	
Erer		defunct	
Hurso		defunct	

== See also ==
- Transport in Ethiopia
- Rail transport in Ethiopia
- Railway stations in Djibouti
- Railway stations in Sudan
- Railway stations in Eritrea
- Lamu Port and Lamu-Southern Sudan-Ethiopia Transport Corridor
- List of cities and towns in Ethiopia
