= Reem Frainah =

Palestinian women's rights activist

Reem Omar Frainah (Arabic: ريم عمر فرينة), most commonly known as Reem Frainah, is a Palestinian human rights activist. She is also the executive director of Aisha Association for Woman and Child Protection.

== Biography ==
Reem Frainah has worked in the field of women's and children's protection in Palestine since 1993. Besides her activism, she studied mathematics at university. After finishing her bachelor's degree, she worked as a teacher in elementary school. During a one-year training course at the Gaza Community Mental Health Program (GCMHP), she got in touch with Eyad al-Sarraj. Through him, she became interested in psychology, and in 2011, she obtained a Master of Arts in Psychology at Al-Azhar University – Gaza. Her dissertation focused on "the trends towards religious commitment and its relationship with marital adjustment of a sample of couples in Gaza city."

One of the programs within the GCMHP evolved into Aisha Association for Woman and Child Protection (AISHA), an independent Palestinian women's organization working to achieve gender integration through economic empowerment and psychosocial support to marginalized groups in the Gaza Strip, with a focus on Gaza City and the North area. When AISHA became an independent institution in 2009, Frainah was appointed as its Program Coordinator. She later became the executive director of AISHA in 2013.

Her work includes teaching and providing a variety of services to the most marginalized women and children in Gaza. She has also written articles, studies and working papers, participated in seminars on the subject, and organized workshops with different actors, including representatives from the Palestinian government, the Bank of Palestine, and Deutsche Gesellschaft für Internationale Zusammenarbeit among others.
