= Dewele =

Town between Ethiopia–Djibouti border

Dewele ደወል
- Town
- Location in Ethiopia
- Coordinates: 11°2′N 42°37′E
- Country: Ethiopia
- Region: Somali
- Zone: Sitti Zone
- Elevation: 898 m (2,946 ft)

Population (2005)
  - Total: 3,357

Dewele (Amharic: ደወል) is a town in Ethiopia, near to the Ethiopia and Djibouti border. Located in the Sitti Zone in the Somali Region the town has a longitude and latitude of 11°2′N 42°37′E with an elevation of 898 meters above sea level.

Dewele is served by a station on the Addis Ababa - Djibouti Railway as well as on the Ethio-Djibouti Railways. It serves as an official crossing point between Djibouti and Ethiopia, with a customs post. In the mid-1960s, gypsum was excavated near the town, then transported to a factory in Dire Dawa to be used in the manufacture cement and plaster of Paris.

== Overview ==
Nearby towns and villages include Ali Sabieh (18 kilometres or 11 miles), Guelile (7 kilometres or 4 miles), Dikhil (64 kilometres or 40 miles), Djibouti City (112 kilometres or 70 miles) in Djibouti, and Aysha (39 kilometres or 24 miles), Hadhagaala (54 kilometres or 34 miles) and Dire Dawa (210 kilometres or 130 miles) in Ethiopia.

== History ==
Dewele was the first point inside the boundaries of Ethiopia to receive train service by the Ethio-Djibouti Railways. The first train ran between Djibouti City and Dewele on 22 July 1901, requiring 5½ hours to make the trip with four halts for water.

In 1907, the Englishmen Bentley and Wells drove a Siddeley automobile from the Red Sea coast to Addis Ababa. They feigned to go to Jaldessa but headed for Dewele instead, to mislead potential shifta or bandits.

During the Djibouti Civil War, Ethiopians who were living in that country and worked in various sectors were forced by the Djiboutian Armed Force to leave that country with whatever they could quickly gather. By February 2001, many had taken refuge in and around Dewele.

== Climate ==
Dewele has a hot desert climate (BWh) in Köppen-Geiger system.

Climate data for Dewele
Month	Jan	Feb	Mar	Apr	May	Jun	Jul	Aug	Sep	Oct	Nov	Dec	Year
Mean daily maximum °C (°F)	25.0 (77.0)	25.7 (78.3)	28.9 (84.0)	30.0 (86.0)	34.1 (93.4)	36.9 (98.4)	36.2 (97.2)	35.3 (95.5)	34.0 (93.2)	30.2 (86.4)	25.9 (78.6)	25.5 (77.9)	30.6 (87.2)
Mean daily minimum °C (°F)	15.0 (59.0)	17.5 (63.5)	19.2 (66.6)	21.6 (70.9)	23.8 (74.8)	26.3 (79.3)	24.3 (75.7)	24.0 (75.2)	24.7 (76.5)	20.6 (69.1)	18.0 (64.4)	16.0 (60.8)	20.9 (69.6)
Average rainfall mm (inches)	15 (0.6)	11 (0.4)	15 (0.6)	23 (0.9)	11 (0.4)	6 (0.2)	26 (1.0)	43 (1.7)	33 (1.3)	9 (0.4)	11 (0.4)	5 (0.2)	208 (8.1)
Source: Climate-Data.org

== Demographics ==
Ethnic groups of Dewele
1. Somali (42.2%)
2. Oromo (27.4%)
3. Amhara (20.9%)
4. Gurage (6.52%)
5. Other (2.94%)

Based on figures from the Central Statistical Agency in 2005, Dewele has an estimated total population of 3,357, of whom 1,710 were males and 1,647 were females. The 1997 census reported Dewele had a total population of 2,253 of whom 1,130 were men and 1,123 women. The four largest ethnic groups reported in this town were the Somali (42.21%), the Oromo (27.43%), the Amhara (20.9%), and the Gurage (6.52%); all other ethnic groups made up 2.94% of the population. It is one of four towns in Ayesha woreda. The town's inhabitants belong to various mainly Afro-Asiatic-speaking ethnic groups, with the Gadabursi Somali predominant.

== See also ==
- Railway stations in Djibouti
- Railway stations in Ethiopia
