= Heir of Zendor =

1996 strategy video game

Heir of Zendor: The Legend and The Land
- Developers: Micronet co., Ltd.
- Publisher: Koei
- Platforms: Sega Saturn, PlayStation
- Release: JP: March 1, 1996; NA: December 12, 1996
- Genre: Strategy
- Mode: Single-player

Heir of Zendor: The Legend and The Land, released in Japan as Gotha II, is a 1996 strategy video game developed by Micronet and published by Koei. It is the sequel to Gotha: Ismailia Seneki. It was an exclusive for the Sega Saturn in North America, while in Japan it also appeared on the PlayStation.

== Plot ==
In contrast to the historical settings of Koei's previous strategy games, Heir of Zendor is set in a science fiction milieu. The planet of Zendor is rich in anti-gravity ore. In the past, pirates grew so strong that they formed a faction called The Guild. The Guild and the Alliance of City States fought for control of the skies for years until accidentally awakening giant battleships. These ships were programmed to protect Terra Sancta (the Sacred Land), a floating continent. The power of the automated battleships was enough to wipe out entire continents, thus ending the war.

One man managed to get past the battleships and their defenses at Terra Sancta, and now controls the last of the major water sources in the world. He allows the water to be controlled and distributed by five of his allies, the "Five Kings". As the population grows and water becomes more scarce, eventually war breaks out between the forces of the Kings, the Alliance of City States, and various rebel factions. The player takes on the role of a Prince of the Royal Alliance Expeditionary Forces in service to the Five Kings.

== Gameplay ==
Heir of Zendor: The Legend and The Land is a turn-based strategy game. At the beginning of each mission, the player can view information on all ships in play and select the ships which will accompany the flagship into battle and their weapons payloads. During battle, each side moves all their ships in turn. In addition to maneuvering and attacking, ships can be moved in formation and be set to automatically retaliate against attacks. The game supports the Saturn Mouse in addition to the standard controller.

Heir of Zendor features multiple story branches. After completing the game, the player can start over with the upgraded ships from the last game.

== Reception ==
Reception

Review scores
| Publication | Score |
|---|---|
| GameSpot | 3/10 |
| Next Generation | 3/5 |

Heir of Zendor: The Legend and The Land received mixed to negative reviews from video game critics. Critics generally praised the refined and involving strategic gameplay, but criticized the spartan graphics, especially the use of static screens for cutscenes. Koei's decision to break from their forte of historical settings was also disapproved of by some critics, though Bonehead of GamePro found the story "deep". GameSpot concluded, "it's hard to believe anyone at Sega or Koei let a product this bad onto the market", while Next Generation felt that though Dragon Force would be a better choice for the typical gamer, war simulation enthusiasts would find Heir of Zendor very enjoyable.
