= Lasarat =

- Location in Ethiopia
- Coordinates: 10°39′N 42°27′E
- Country: Ethiopia
- Region: Somali
- Zone: Shinile
- Elevation: 741 m (2,431 ft)

Population (2005)
  - Total: 2,269

Lasarat (also known as Laso Harrad) is a town in eastern Ethiopia. Located in the Shinile Zone of the Somali Region, this town has a latitude and longitude of 10°40′N 42°27′E with an elevation between 740 and 817 meters above sea level.

Lasarat is served by a station on the Ethio-Djibouti Railways.

== Demographics ==
As of 2007, the population of Lasarat has been estimated to be 2,371. The city's inhabitants belong to various mainly Afro-Asiatic-speaking ethnic groups, with the Issa Somali predominant.
