= Kora, Ethiopia =

Town in central Ethiopia

Coordinates: 08°49′00″N 38°57′00″E

Kora is a town in central Ethiopia. It is one of a number of populated places in the country with this name.

== Transport ==
The town is served by a station on the Ethio-Djibouti Railways.

== See also ==
- Railway stations in Ethiopia
