= Harewa, Ethiopia =

Harewa
- Location in Ethiopia
- Coordinates: 9°55′N 41°58′E
- Country: Ethiopia
- Region: Somali
- Zone: Shinile
- Elevation: 790 m (2,590 ft)

Population
  - Total: 230.000

Harewa is a town in eastern Ethiopia. Located in the Shinile Zone of the Somali Region. This town is served by a station on the Ethio-Djibouti Railways.

== Demographics ==
Based on figures from the Central Statistical Agency in 2005, Harewa has an estimated total population of 1,787, of whom 964 are men and 823 are women. The 1997 census reported this town had a total population of 2,231 of whom 1,245 were men and 986 women. The two largest ethnic groups reported in this town were the Somali (98.74%), and the Amhara (0.76%); all other ethnic groups made up the remaining 0.5% of the residents. It is one of four towns in Shinile woreda.
