= Mieso, Somali (woreda) =

District in Somali Region, Ethiopia

Coordinates: 9°40′N 41°00′E

Mieso is a woreda in Somali Region, Ethiopia. Part of the Shinile Zone, this woreda is bordered on the south by the Oromia Region, on the northwest by the Afar Region, and on the east by the Afdem woreda. The administrative center for this woreda is Mulu town.

== Demographics ==
Based on the 2017 Census conducted by the Central Statistical Agency of Ethiopia (CSA), this woreda has a total population of 92,086, of whom 47,187 are men and 44,899 women. While 1,212 are urban inhabitants, a further 90,874 were pastoralists.

Based on figures published by the CSA in 2005, this woreda has an estimated total population of 53,665, of whom 24,783 are men and 28,882 are women. Information is not available on the area of Mieso, so its population density cannot be calculated. This woreda is primarily inhabited by the Somali people of the Hawiye clan, from the Jidle (Dalcowstire) and Gaaljecel sub-clans.

The 1994 national census reported a total population for this woreda of 44,409, of whom 24,169 were men and 19,840 were women; the census identified no urban inhabitants. The largest ethnic group reported in Mieso was the Somali people (94.90%).
