= Ejaji =

Ethiopian town

Ejaji is a town in the woreda of Cheliya, Ethiopia. In 2015, it had a total population of 12,533 people.

== Transport ==
It proposed to be a junction on the western line of the proposed Ethiopian railway.

Ejaji is a town in central Ethiopia. Located in the West Shewa Zone of the Oromia Region, on the all-weather highway between Addis Ababa and Nekemte, this town has a longitude and latitude of 8.9970° N, 37.3266°E. Ejaji is the administrative center of Elu Gelan woreda.

== See also ==
- Railway stations in Ethiopia
- List of cities and towns in Ethiopia
