= Guelile =

Guelile Galileh جليل
- Town
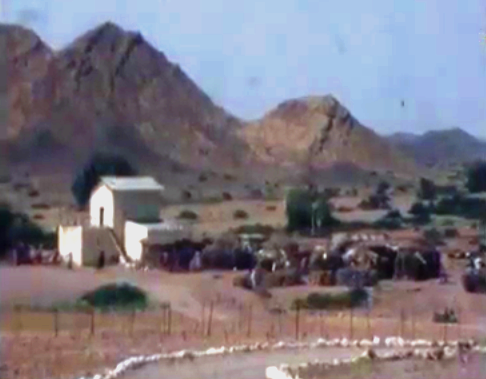
- A photo of Guelile in 1977.

- Location in Djibouti
- Coordinates: 11°05′N 42°38′E
- Country: Djibouti
- Region: Ali Sabieh
- Elevation: 810 m (2,660 ft)

Population
  - Total: 885
- Climate: BSh

Guelile (Arabic: جليل) is a town located in southern Djibouti. Guelile is one of the main border crossing for goods coming in and out of Djibouti, primarily from the ports of Djibouti. It is situated about 104 kilometres (65 miles) southwest of Djibouti City.

== Overview ==
Nearby towns and villages include Ali Sabieh (10 kilometres or 6 miles), Holhol (40 kilometres or 25 miles), Assamo (25 kilometres or 16 miles), Dewele (7 kilometres or 4 miles), Aysha (46 kilometres or 29 miles) and Dire Dawa (218 kilometres or 135 miles).

== Climate and geography ==
Guelile has a Semi-arid climate (BSh) in Köppen-Geiger system. Located in the Arramadowle Valley, Guelile is sheltered by the Arrei Mountains to the east, the Oudougo Djogta Mountains to the west. Guelile generally features is warm winters and hot summers and is located at an altitude of 810 metres or 2,660 feet above sea level in low-shrouded mountains and hills. The average daytime temperatures during the summer months of June and August can rise to 35 °C (95 °F), with a low of 25 °C (77 °F) at night. The weather is cooler the rest of the year, averaging 25 °C (77 °F) during the day and 16 °C (60 °F) at nighttime.

Climate data for Guelile
Month	Jan	Feb	Mar	Apr	May	Jun	Jul	Aug	Sep	Oct	Nov	Dec	Year
Mean daily maximum °C (°F)	23 (73)	24 (75)	25 (77)	27 (81)	30 (86)	36 (97)	35 (95)	35 (95)	33 (91)	27 (81)	25 (77)	24 (75)	29 (84)
Mean daily minimum °C (°F)	15 (59)	16 (61)	17 (63)	19 (66)	22 (72)	25 (77)	25 (77)	25 (77)	23 (73)	19 (66)	17 (63)	15 (59)	20 (68)
Average rainfall mm (inches)	16 (0.6)	12 (0.5)	19 (0.7)	26 (1.0)	11 (0.4)	6 (0.2)	25 (1.0)	45 (1.8)	34 (1.3)	9 (0.4)	12 (0.5)	5 (0.2)	220 (8.6)
Source: The Weather Channel
