= Borchotto =

Ethiopian town

Coordinates: 08°46′00″N 39°43′00″E

Borchotto is a town in central Ethiopia.

== Transport ==
It is served indirectly by a station on the national railway system.

== See also ==
- Railway stations in Ethiopia
