= Erer =

- Location within Ethiopia
- Coordinates: 9°34′N 41°23′E
- Country: Ethiopia
- Region: Somali Region
- Zone: Sitti Zone
- Woreda: Erer
- Elevation: 1,107 m (3,632 ft)

Population (2018)
  - Total: 649,000
- Time zone: UTC+3 (EAT)

Erer is a town in central Ethiopia. Located in the Sitti Zone of the Somali Region, it is located 51km east of Shinile. It is the administrative center of Erer Woreda.

== Overview ==
Erer has had telephone service at least as early as 1967. Records at the Nordic Africa Institute website provide details of a primary school in Bentu Liben during the year 1968. Erer is served by a station on the Addis Ababa - Djibouti Railway.

W.C. Barker recorded in 1842 that Erer was a usual stopping-point for caravans moving between Djibouti and Dire Dawa, citing the words of an acquaintance who described the location as "a place at the foot of the Oromo people hills, where there is a wadi with excellent water." As to the inhabitants, Barker notes that north of Erer dwelled the Gurgura, "who are Mahomedans", and subject to the Issa Somali; to the south were the Argobba; and to the east were the Nole and Ala Oromo, "occupying the N[orth] and the S[outh] side of the road to Harrar."

== Demographics ==
Based on figures from the Central Statistical Agency of Ethiopia published in 2007, Erer has an estimated total population of 7,490 of whom 3,797 are men and 3,693 women. The 1997 census reported this town had a total population of 5,027 of whom 2,509 were men and 2,518 women. The four largest ethnic groups reported in this town were the Somali (38.07%), the Oromo (33.1%), the Amhara (21.24%), and the Gurage (4.97%); all other ethnic groups made up the remaining 2.71% of the residents.

== See also ==
- Railway stations in Ethiopia
