= Bike, Ethiopia =

Bike Biki (Somali)
- Location within Ethiopia
- Coordinates: 9°31′47″N 41°11′49″E
- Country: Ethiopia
- Region: Somali
- Zone: Sitti Zone
- Woreda: Bike
- Elevation: 1,116 m (3,661 ft)

Population (2024)
  - Total: 200,000
- Time zone: UTC+3 (EAT)

Bike (Somali: Biki) is a town in central Ethiopia of the Somali Region in the Sitti Zone. It is located 72 km west of Shinile. The town is located on the main railway between Djibouti City and Addis Ababa.

According to some story the name bike word original from Italian it means center because the town become center for railway that connects Addis Ababa and Djibouti.

In addition to This town Known by Contraband the establishment and the development of the town was Railway and Contraband.

== Demographics ==
The town's inhabitants belong to various mainly Afro-Asiatic-speaking ethnic groups, with the Wardiq, Saad Moussa and Walaldon Issa Somali predominant. Based on figures from the Central Statistical Agency in 2005, Bike has an estimated total population of 9,197, of whom 4,789 are men and 4,408 are women. The 1997 census reported this town had a total population of 6,168 of whom 3,163 were men and 3,005 women. The three largest ethnic groups reported in this town were the Somali (81.74%), the Oromo (14.72%), and the Amhara (2.8%); all other ethnic groups made up the remaining 0.74% of the residents.

== Climate ==
The climate of Bike is a hot semi-arid climate (Köppen: BSh), with the influence of mountain climate; the seasonal difference is minor. This is unlike nearby Jijiga attributed to the fact that Jijiga, like close by Harar, is located on top of the Ahmar mountain range surrounded by mountains on all sides and its distance to the sea affects its temperatures, which even in the wet season, are not as high as Bike's, generally not going above 31 °C (88 °F). Daytime highs are between 20 and 29 °C (68 and 84 °F) all year long with lows between 7 and 16 °C (45 and 61 °F) – an example of classic Ethiopian highland temps. It catches large amounts of moisture in the rainy season with totally annual rainfall of about 700–900 mm (28–35 in) a year giving a subtropical highland climate as with the rest of the highlands of Ethiopia.

Climate data for Bike
Month	Jan	Feb	Mar	Apr	May	Jun	Jul	Aug	Sep	Oct	Nov	Dec	Year
Mean daily maximum °C (°F)	28.5 (83.3)	29.2 (84.6)	30.8 (87.4)	31.5 (88.7)	32.9 (91.2)	34.1 (93.4)	32.6 (90.7)	31.3 (88.3)	31.8 (89.2)	31.4 (88.5)	29.6 (85.3)	28.5 (83.3)	31.0 (87.8)
Mean daily minimum °C (°F)	14.5 (58.1)	15.7 (60.3)	17.5 (63.5)	18.3 (64.9)	19.0 (66.2)	20.6 (69.1)	19.5 (67.1)	18.9 (66.0)	19.4 (66.9)	17.3 (63.1)	14.8 (58.6)	13.7 (56.7)	17.4 (63.4)
Average rainfall mm (inches)	21 (0.8)	41 (1.6)	64 (2.5)	88 (3.5)	58 (2.3)	35 (1.4)	97 (3.8)	136 (5.4)	72 (2.8)	25 (1.0)	16 (0.6)	7 (0.3)	660 (26)
Source: Climate-Data.org
