= China–Djibouti relations =

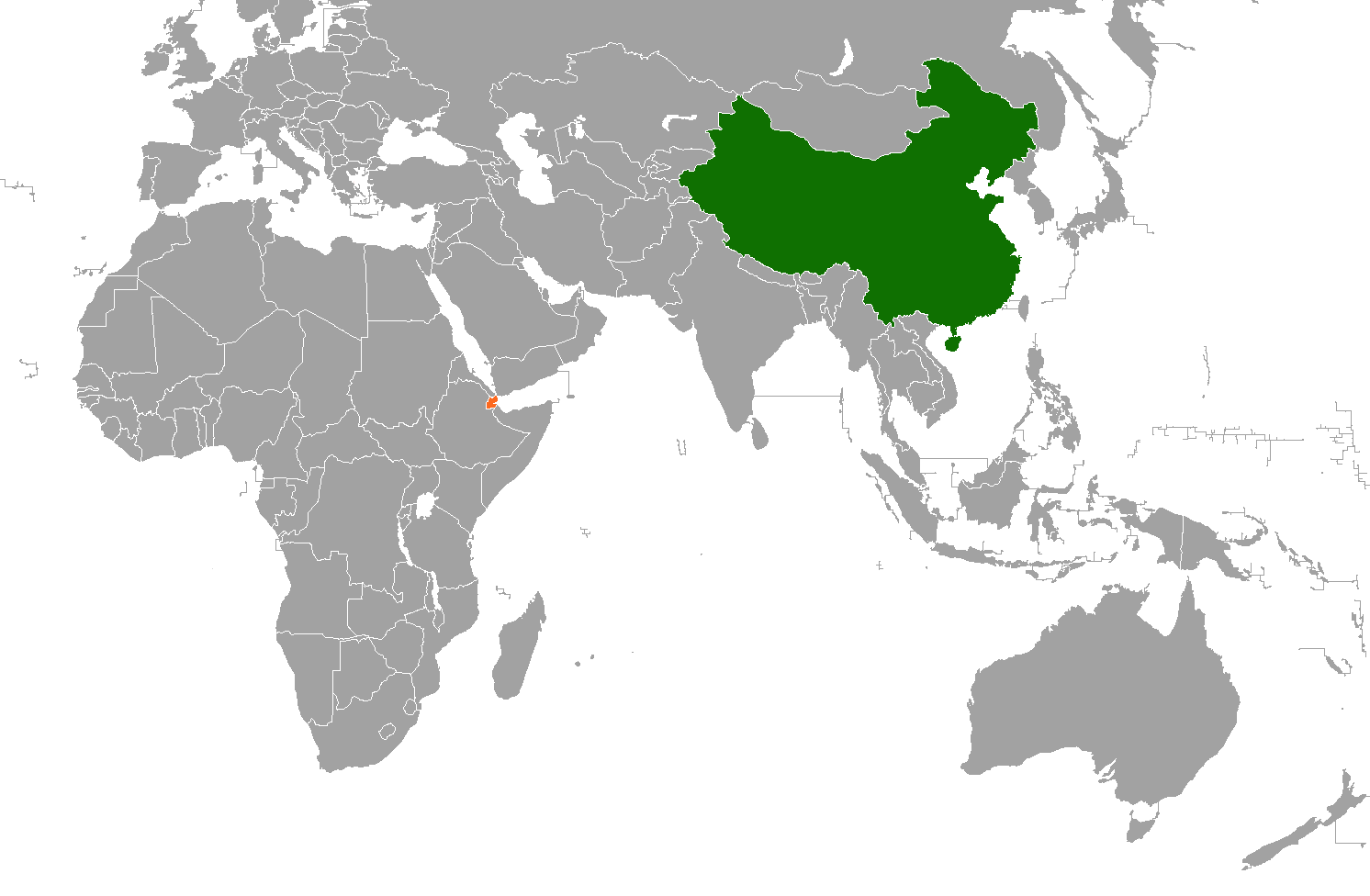
- China: Djibouti

Diplomatic mission
- Embassy of Djibouti, Beijing: Embassy of China, Djibouti

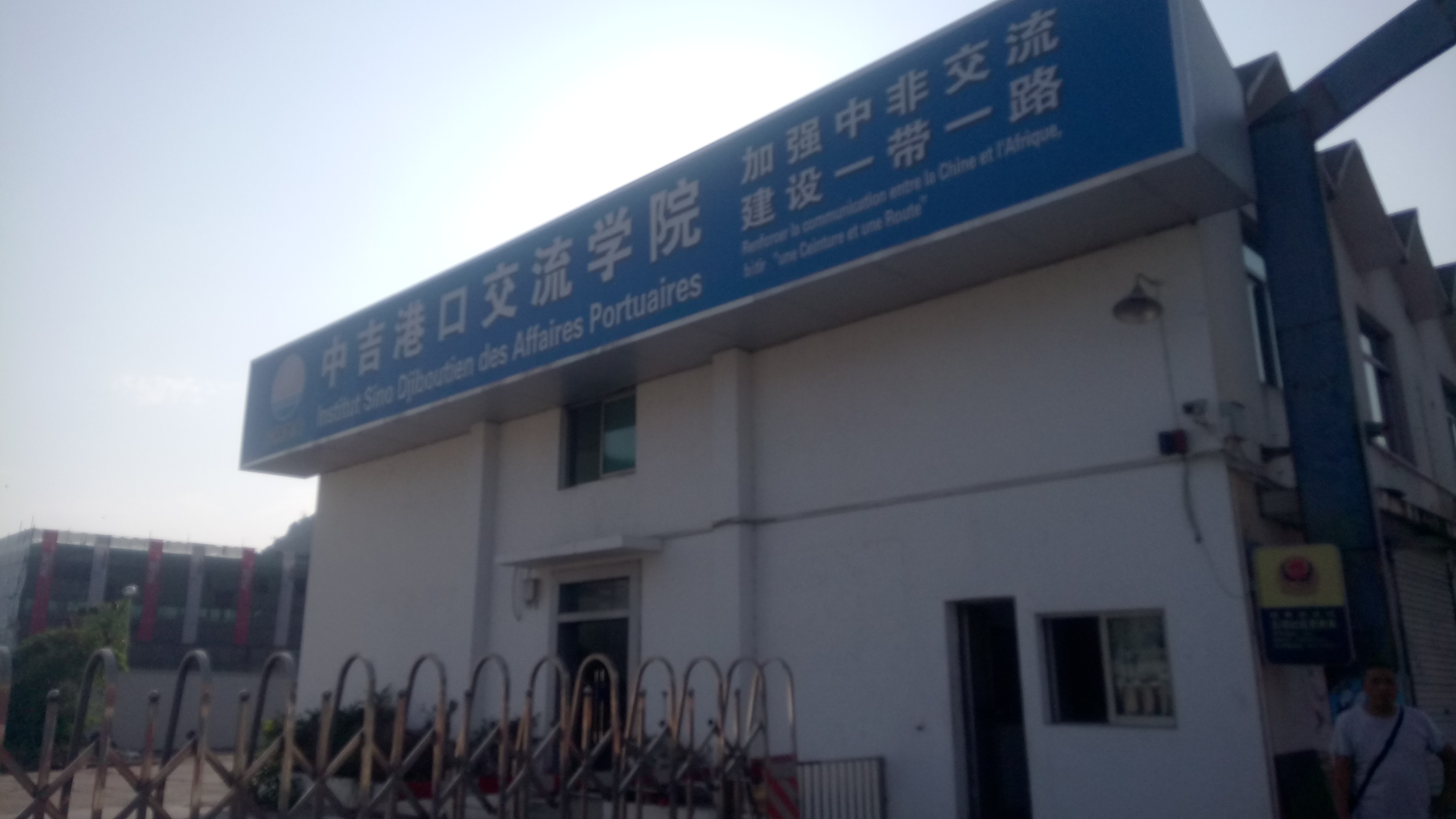
Institut Sino Djiboutien des Affaires Portuaires ("Sino-Djiboutian Port Affairs Institute"; 中吉港口交流学院) - Shenzhen

China–Djibouti relations refers to the current and historical relationship between the People's Republic of China and Djibouti. China and Djibouti established relations on January 8, 1979. China has financed a number of public works projects in Djibouti, including a stadium, the offices of the Ministry of Foreign Affairs and the People's Palace. In September 2010, Type 920 Hospital Ship, also known as the "Peace Ark", visited Djibouti.

In 2017, China and Djibouti agreed to a strategic partnership.

== Economic development ==
Since the first Forum on China Africa Cooperation in 2000, Beijing has delivered $16.6 million in development finance to Djibouti. Major Chinese aid projects in Djibouti include:

- $8.2 million to fund the construction of a hospital in Arta
- A $2.41 million grant for construction of a new headquarters for the Djiboutian Foreign Minister
- $1.75 million in food aid during a drought in Djibouti in 2005

Djibouti joined the Belt and Road Initiative (BRI) in 2018.

=== Ethiopia-Djibouti Potable Water Project ===
In 2017, China announced the launch of a cross-border potable water project between Ethiopia and Djibouti. The project will include the installation of a 102 kilometer long pipeline to draw groundwater from the Ethiopian town of Hadagalla to be provided to the towns of Ali-Sabieh, Dikhil, Arta and Djibouti city.

=== Spaceport ===
In January 2023, Djibouti signed a deal with the Hong Kong Aerospace Technology Group to build the first African spaceport. The agreement followed a January 7th visit of a delegation from the company led by Vice President Allen Fund to meet with the Djiboutian government and Chinese Ambassador to Djibouti Hu Bin. The $1 billion USD project, expected to be completed in 2028, provides the Chinese company full ownership of the spaceport for 30 years, after which the facility will be handed over to Djibouti. Djibouti represents an advantageous location for orbital launches as its proximity to the Earth's equator (10° latitude) and the consequential increased rotational speed requires less fuel for launches.

== Military development ==
=== Support base ===
In 2016, construction began on a Chinese naval outpost in Djibouti. The site was slated to become China's first overseas military installation, with an estimated cost of $600 million. According to Djiboutian Minister of Foreign Affairs Mahmoud Ali Youssouf, the 90-acre plot would likely house only 300 Chinese troops and would require the Chinese government to pay the Djiboutian government $20 million annually for ten years with an option for an additional period of ten years.

== Medical cooperation ==
On its 2017 mission to Africa, the People's Liberation Army Navy hospital ship Peace Ark traveled to Djibouti where it treated 7,841 Djiboutian patients.

== Sovereignty issues ==
Djibouti follows the one China principle. It recognizes the People's Republic of China as the sole government of China and Taiwan as an integral part of China's territory, and supports all efforts by the PRC to "achieve national reunification". It also considers Hong Kong, Xinjiang and Tibet to be China's internal affairs.

In July 2019, UN ambassadors from 50 countries, including Djibouti, have signed a joint letter to the UNHRC defending China's treatment of Uyghurs and other Muslim minority groups in the Xinjiang region. In June 2020, Djibouti was one of 53 countries that backed the Hong Kong national security law at the United Nations.

== See also ==
- Africa–China relations
- String of Pearls (Indian Ocean)
