= Aisha al-Adawiya =

American interfaith activist

- Born: 1944 (age 81–82); Alabama
- Other name: Sister Aisha
- Occupations: Human rights activist, community organizer
- Known for: Founder of Women In Islam, Inc.

Aisha al-Adawiya, also known as Sister Aisha, is an interfaith-based activist and founder of Women in Islam, an organization that advocates for Islamic women. She worked for the Schomburg Center for Research in Black Culture for over 30 years.

== Early life and education ==
Al-Adawiya was born and raised in Alabama. She describes the American South during the 1940s and 1950s as "very segregated, and very unequal" but says she was sheltered from this growing up by her family and other people within her community.

== Nation of Islam ==
So just imagine, here's a young girl, walking into a barbershop that's owned by the Nation. It was classroom time. I was completely open to everything, and they wanted to expose and teach me to what they were doing. They were trying to uplift the community.

— Aisha al-Adawiya

After graduating high school in the early 1960s, al-Adawiya moved to Harlem in New York City to pursue a career as a jazz vocalist. al-Adawiya was exposed to the Nation of Islam while seeking a haircut, and entered a barbershop owned by Nation of Islam members. She cites this experience as introducing her to Elijah Muhammad, Pan-Africanism, and Black power.

Inspired by Malcolm X's message of "justice as spiritual calling", she soon converted to Islam. al-Adawiya was also close with Malcolm X's wife and later widow, Betty Shabazz.

== Career ==
Al-Adawiya worked for Schomburg Center for Research in Black Culture for over 30 years. She was responsible for coordinating Islamic input into the Preservation of the Black Religious Heritage Documentation project. al-Adawiya worked to preserve records of Malcolm X and was also a scholarship officer.

In response to the genocidal rape against Muslims in the Bosnian genocide, Al-Adawiya founded Women in Islam in 1992, which was the "first national women’s organization founded by and on behalf of Muslim women". al-Adawiya formed a national campaign to advocate for the creation of women-friendly mosques, urging mosques to welcome women for prayer as well as recruiting women to serve on mosque governing boards. al-Adawiya is also a founding member of the Malcolm X Museum.

al-Adawiya retired from Schomburg in 2021.

== Awards and honors ==
- In 2016, al-Adawiya was named one of the top 100 Muslim Social Justice Leaders by MPower Change, the largest Muslim digital advocacy organization in the Americas
- In 2017, al-Adawiya was a recipient of the Clara Lemlich Award for her four decades of interfaith-based activism
- In 2018, the Council on American–Islamic Relations awarded al-Adawiya its annual Lifetime Achievement Award
- In 2022, al-Adawiya received a humanitarian award from Emine Erdogan, the First Lady of Turkey, for her activism in human rights and social justice
