= Ayesha Saffar =

Iranian Muslim woman narrator (1078–1153)

- Born: Ayesha bint Ahmad Safar bin Mansour bin Abd Safar Neishaburi; 1078 Nishabur, Persia
- Died: 1153 (aged 74–75)
- Occupation: Hadith

Ayesha Saffar Neishaburi (1078 – 1153; full name: Ayesha bint Ahmad Safar bin Mansour bin Abd Safar Neishaburi) was an Iranian Muslim Hadith scholar in the fifth Hijri century. She was born in 1078 in Nishabur and was killed in 1153 when the Oghuz Turks attacked Nishabur.
