= Ayşegül Savaş =

Turkish writer

Ayşegül Savaş is a Turkish writer who writes in English.

== Education and influences ==
She was raised in Turkey and Denmark, then attended Middlebury College in Vermont. She graduated in 2007. She worked as a staff writer on The Middlebury Campus, writing often for the paper's arts section. She majored in sociology and anthropology. During her years at Middlebury she studied abroad in Russia (Yaroslavl) and France (Paris). She received an MFA at the University of San Francisco.

Among authors who have influenced her, she names Patrick Modiano, and Enrique Vila-Matas.

== Novels ==
Her first novel was Walking on the Ceiling (2019), published by Riverhead Books. A reviewer in Booklist called it "deceptively simple and subtly profound." The second, published by the same publishing house, is titled White on White (2021). Anthony Cummins of The Guardian reviewed it favorably, noting that the writing style in the book is like austere painting. Her third novel, The Anthropologists (2024), was published by Bloomsbury, and was nominated for the National Book Critics Circle Award. It was a New York Times editor's choice, one of the best books of the year by The New Yorker, TIME Magazine, Publishers Weekly, and best book of 2024 according to Vulture (New York magazine).

== Short fiction and essays ==
She has published short stories and essays in publications that include The New Yorker, The Paris Review, The Yale Review, Los Angeles Review of Books, Literary Hub, Granta, and The Dublin Review among others.

Long Distance: Stories was longlisted for the 2025 National Book Critics Circle Award for Fiction.

== Non-fiction ==
In 2024, Savaş published a non-fiction work, titled The Wilderness about the first 40 days of the postpartum and the mythology surrounding this period.

== Bibliography ==
=== Novels ===
- Savaş, Ayşegül (2019). Walking on the Ceiling. Penguin. ISBN 978-0-525-53741-0.
- — (2022). White on White. New York: Penguin. ISBN 978-0-593-33052-4.
- — (2024). The Anthropologists. Bloomsbury Publishing USA. ISBN 978-1-63973-306-4.

=== Short fiction ===
Collections

- Savaş, Ayşegül (2025). Long distance : stories. New York: Bloomsbury.

Stories (Note: Short stories unless otherwise noted.)

| Title | Year | First published | Reprinted/collected | Notes |
|---|---|---|---|---|
| Future selves | 2021 | Savaş, Ayşegül (March 29, 2021). "Future selves". Fiction. The New Yorker. 97 (6): 56–60. | | |

=== Non-fiction ===
- Savaş, Ayşegül (2024). The Wilderness. Berkeley: Transit Books. ISBN 979-8-89338-909-8.

———————

Bibliography notes
