= Mount Afdem =

Ethiopian mountain range

- Location within Ethiopia

Highest point
- Elevation: 2,065 m (6,775 ft)
- Coordinates: 9°30′01″N 40°50′29″E

Geography
- Location: Shinile Zone, Somali Region, Ethiopia

Mount Afdem is a mountain range in Ethiopia. With an average elevation of 2,062 metres (6,765 ft).

The peak provides fantastic views of the surrounding mountains and features a tarn (alpine pond) in the bowl near its base.

== Climate ==
Elevation is the major factor in temperature levels, with the higher areas, on average, as 10 °C (50 °F) cooler, day or night. The overnight lows are not like the "Garden of Eden" because, at night, heavy clothes or blankets are needed, in the highlands, when the temperature drops to about 50–53 °F (10–12 °C) every ni

The Pond
