= Ayesha Faridi =

Indian news anchor

- Born: 8 February 1982 (age 43); Delhi, India
- Citizenship: (India) Indian
- Occupations: News anchor and Journalist
- Agent: ET Now
- Spouse: Nakul Vengsarkar (m. 2013)

Ayesha Faridi (born 8 February 1982) is an anchor for the Indian business news channel ET Now.

== Personal life ==
Ayesha is the daughter of Javed Faridi and Vinita Faridi. She married architect Nakul Vengsarkar, the son of cricketer Dilip Vengsarkar, on April 27, 2013 in a high-profile ceremony held in New Delhi.

== Career ==
Ayesha began her career in 2003 with BBC World Service as a Reporter where she reported and anchored BBC's weekly half-hr show BBC Extra. Formulated, conceptualized and executed scripts, editing and show structures for BBC. She joined ET Now in May 2010.
