= Ayesha pole move =

Pole dance manoeuvre

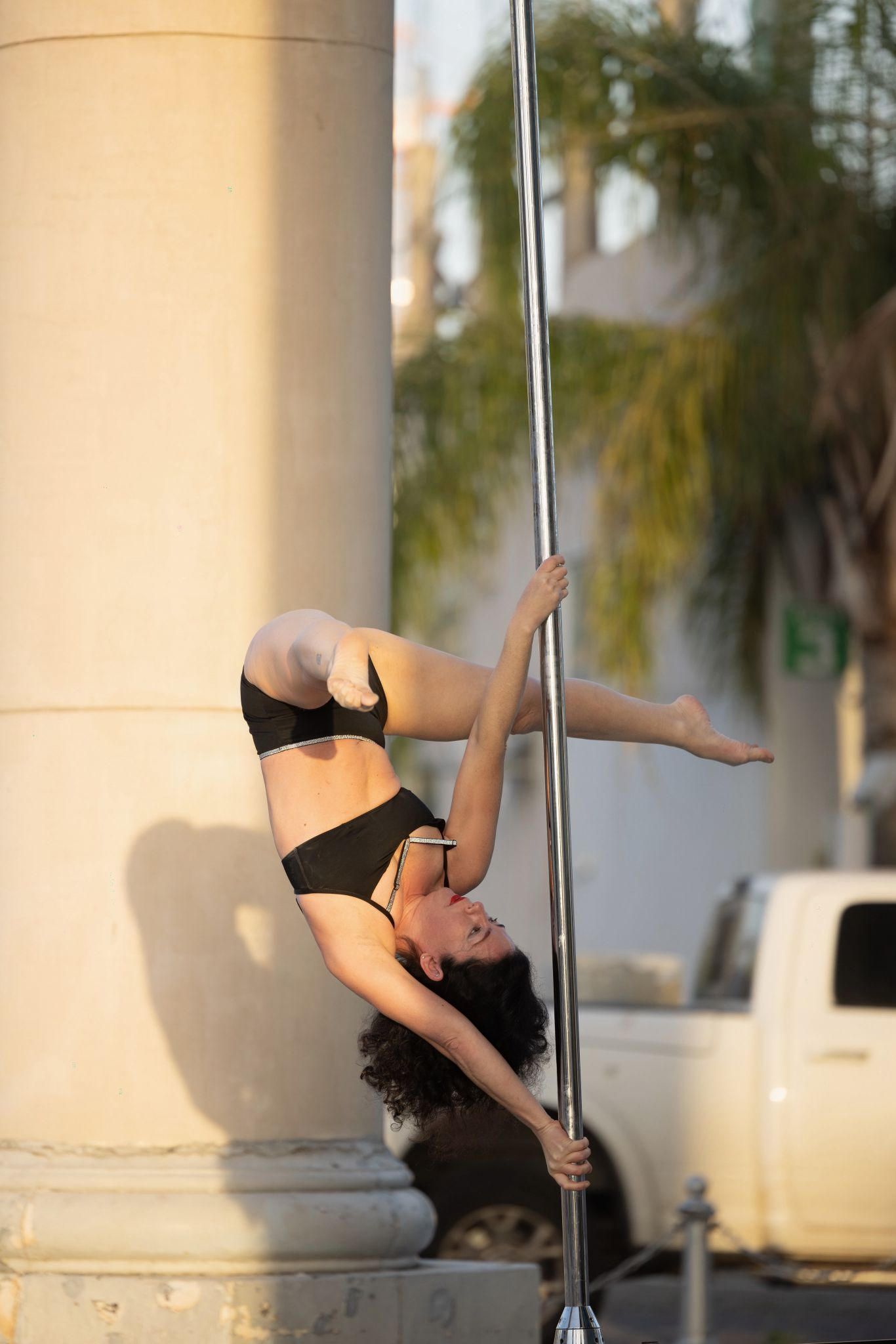
Ayesha pole move

The Ayesha is an advanced pole dance position, where the dancer suspends their body weight with two hands in an inverted position, and opens their legs in a V facing the pole.

There are several grip variations for the Ayesha, including a split grip, twisted grip, and elbow grip. There are different ways to get into an ayesha: from a basic inversion, by doing a caterpillar (pulling through the top arm and pushing through the bottom arm, creating a "D" shape) to create space between the torso and the pole; from an extended butterfly (one leg straightened in contact with the pole by the ankle and foot, and the other leg straightened away from the pole), bringing the inside leg around toward the face; or directly from a handspring.

== How to perform the Ayesha pole move ==
The sidebar video shows the Ayesha pole move performed from a basic inversion.

How to perform the Ayesha pole move
