= Aisha Ali Chopra =

Indian singer and songwriter (born 1989)

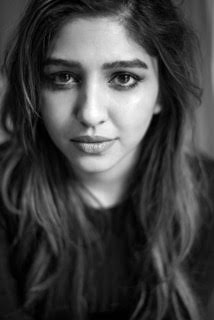
- Born: 16 September 1989 (age 36); Bengaluru, Karnataka, India
- Education: Rishi Valley School
- Occupation: Singer
- Spouse: Akash Sagar Chopra

Aisha Ali Chopra (born 16 September 1989) known as Aisha, is an Indian singer, songwriter and contemporary dancer. She released her debut single Hasratein in September 2017, taken from the album / ep Naaz which released in November 2017.

== Early life ==
Born in Seem Andhra and raised in Bengaluru, India, Aisha studied at the Rishi Valley School while pursuing training in Carnatic music (Vocals and Mridangam) for 8 years and also learned Choral Music at the same time. During her growing years, she has performed in various singing and dancing competitions and has sung for various Jingles, and Radio commercials. Aisha has also worked as a Karaoke Jockey in Bengaluru and collaborated on Singles with various hip hop/rap music acts.

== Career ==
In the year 2011, Aisha was selected for the International Avon Voices Talent hunt. Aisha won the round 2 of the event which was held in Hong Kong where she represented India. The competition was judged by the six-time Grammy award winner and lead singer of the American band Black Eyed Peas, Fergie; legendary songwriter, Diane Warren; Grammy nominated singer-songwriter, Natasha Bedingfield, Filipina singer, actress, and columnist Lea Salonga, and Russian sensation, Valeriya, among others.

With a trademark vocal style of combining Pop, Contemporary R&B, and Indian Classical Aisha released her debut single, "Hasratein" followed by the release of her debut album / ep "Naaz".

== Discography ==
- "Hasratein" Single – (release date 29 September 2017)
- "Naaz" – (release date 24 November 2017)

== See also ==
- List of Indian playback singers
