= GoTa =

CDMA-based digital trunking system

In telephony, GoTa or “Global Open Trunking Architecture” is a CDMA-based digital trunking system. The GoTA system was developed by ZTE, a Chinese manufacturer. It was approved as a CCSA standard by the China Ministry of Industry and Information Technology in 2008 and accepted as an international standard by the ITU in 2012. The GoTA system can be used for both private and public trunking network applications.

GoTa is capable of providing a variety of trunking services:

- One-to-one private calls and one-to-many group calls
- The ability to set the user's priority
- The ability to perform forced insertion/forced release based on the user's priority
- The ability to provide special services such as system paging, group paging, sub-group paging, and dedicated Push-To-Talk services as required
- The ability to classify the groups into permanent and temporary groups, in which the group members can be managed by the user.

In addition to trunking service, GoTa can provide value-added services such as short messages, location-based services and other data services. The original GoTa standard was developed for the 800 MHz band. GoTa is adapted to work in the 450 MHz band as well.

== Notes ==
PTT PoC or Push to talk over Cellular is a feature similar to walkie-talkie that is provided over a cellular phone network.
