= Aisha Diori =

Activist

Aisha
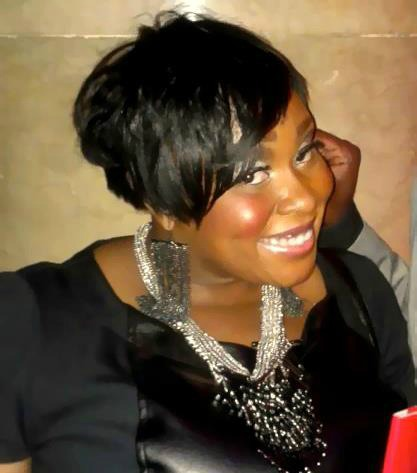
- Born: 8 September; Africa, West Africa
- Occupations: Community Mobiliser, Special Events Director, Educator, Performer, Talk Show Host, Comedian, Event MC, (Women's Face), and "Iconic Mother" in Ball culture.
- Writing career
- Period: 1990's to present
- Notable works: Mother of the House of Iman, an all-women's House, founder of the Kiki Ballroom Scene: an HIV prevention intervention for LGBTQ youth in Ballroom culture, House of Prodigy Godmother, and Overall Mother Latex through GMHC. Events Specialist un all facets of events, Cultural Commentator, Pan Africanist, Performer, Cultural Influencer, and Host Mina TV Africa.
- Website: glitteratieent.com

Aisha Diori (born 8 September in Africa, West Africa) is an Events Director, Community Mobiliser, HIV/AIDS Preventionist, educator, Talk Show Host, Event MC, Pan-Africanist, and has been named "Iconic Mother" in Ball culture. Her father Abdullah is a business person, and her mother is Betty Graves, the first Ghanaian / Nigerian woman to own a travel agency in Nigeria.

Aisha holds a Bachelor of Arts in advertising and marketing communications from Fashion Institute of Technology where she graduated magna cum laude. Diori's HIV prevention work with LGBTQ youth in Ball culture, an LGBT subculture, has been influential in the field of public health. She is the founder of the KiKi Ballroom scene and is considered an expert in engaging this historically difficult-to-reach population. Her expertise is requested for grants and program development, and research and curriculum development.

Aisha worked at the Hetrick-Martin Institute as a Director of Health and Wellness, and is the Mother of the House of Iman, a WBT (women, butch and transgender) people house in New York City. In February 2014, Aisha joined the Schomburg Center for Research in Black Culture in Harlem as Special Events Manager, and continues her involvement with LGBTQ people in the House ball community. In Aug 2018, Diori joined the MINA TV AFRICA in NYC as a host for their Award Winning ABS Show covering trending news in Africa and the World.

== Early life ==
Aisha Dori was born in Nigeria to her father Abdullah and Betty Graves whilst her father was in exile. She has a brother named Chris, who was also born in Nigeria.

Diori was an AmeriCorps VISTA volunteer through the Council of Churches of the City of New York. She developed programming for inner city elderly people.

== Career and Ballroom ==
In mid-1997, Diori attended the Mooshood Ball and became interested in the gender nonconformity and queer pageantry. The Ball was not simply a gay dance party; according to her blog "It was full of safer sex messaging, freedom, pageantry sexiness, beautiful feminine women, strong handsome butch women…" Diori approached Arbert Santana, who was then the Mother of the House of Latex and an LGBT and HIV awareness activist. Diori connected with fellow Fashion Institute of Technology classmate Ricky Revlon. Revlon, who later became Diori's "gay father", along with Santana who later became Diori's "gay mother", helped her into the House of Latex, changing her commitment to the LGBTQ community.

Diori began working as an outreach worker at the Gay Men's Health Crisis (GMHC), hosting HIV prevention balls to curtail the number of newly HIV infected youth. Diori began participating in "walking" balls. Under the guidance of her gay parents, Diori was advised to walk in the Women's Face and Big Girls Runway categories for her first ball, The Black Pride Ball. Diori won the top prize in both categories. Her interests in the ballroom culture shifted from being a participant to being a community organiser and intervention specialist. Diori received the title of "house-mother" from The House of Latex, due to her commitment to ballroom culture, a title she held for nearly five years.

In late 2007, Diori opened the House of Iman, pairing safer sex and prevention messages that specifically targeted the Women, Butch and Transgender (WBT) ballroom scene. Aisha infused progressive safer sex and educational messaging with pageantry. The House of Iman, a name that pays homage to Diori's Nigerian heritage, continues to be a source of leadership in the WBT community.

Acknowledging that youth were not best served in the mainstream ballroom scene, Diori and Santana created the KiKiscene, a ballroom-infused HIV prevention intervention and movement focusing on LGBTQ youth ages 12 to 24, where the young people vogue, hang out with friends and get connected to HIV testing, counseling and healthcare services.

In February 2014, Diori began working for the Schomburg Center for Research in Black Culture in Harlem as Special Events Manager. Diori has secured successful rentals, created robust public programs, created grassroot fundraising and events for the Schomburg. She curates and manages the Schomburg First Fridays event series.

Aisha also has an entertainment spin to her existing experience in events. She is a comedian and event MC for many events within the Black Diaspora such as (Miss Nigeria USA pageant, Nigeria Ent Awards, African Diaspora Awards, Afropolitan NYC, Africa Restaurant Week, Schomburg Center Comic Book Festival Cosplay, BAM Black Comix Festival, MASCARA Trans Day Of Remembrance Conference, First Fridays at the Schomburg, One Africa Music Week NYC, Afro beats To The World at PlayStation Theater 2019, NYC Black Pride NYC to name a few). She has also created a comedic character named “Ms. Ayodele”, who is a no holds barred Nigerian Mother/Aunty who gives unsolicited advice on YouTube. You can also catch her on The Abs Show on Mina TV Africa, where she and her co-hosts bring you up to speed on popular culture topics in Africa.

Aisha also has an entertainment spin to her existing experience in events. She is a comedian and event MC for many events within the Black Diaspora such as Miss Nigeria USA pageant, Nigeria Ent Awards, African Diaspora Awards, Afropolitan NYC, Africa Restaurant Week, Schomburg Center Comic Book Festival Cosplay, BAM Black Comix Festival, MASCARA Trans Day Of Remembrance Conference, First Fridays at the Schomburg, One Africa Music Week NYC, Afro beats To The World at PlayStation Theater 2019, and NYC Black Pride NYC. She has a comedic YouTube channel where she plays the character "Ms. Ayodele," a no holds barred sassy Nigerian Mother/Aunty who gives unsolicited advice. She is also a host on The Abs Show on Mina TV Africa where she and her co-hosts discuss topics in African popular culture.

Diori fostered the creation of a social conscious collective of creatives to create a Charity called Africa Everything . It promotes an Annual Afro beats Diaspora event fundraiser, a collective formed to promote and empower the Black African Diaspora with music, culture, and unique event experiences. Funds raised are invested in helping foster educational programs and initiatives all over West Africa.

== Professional memberships ==
- C2P: Connect to Protect, NYC Year-Current.
- Research Committee for Edgar Rivera Colon's dissertation, Getting life in two worlds: power and prevention in the New York City House Ball community, 2009.
- Marlon Bailey's interviews for his book, Butch/Queens Up in Pumps: Gender, Performance, and Ballroom Culture in Detroit, 2012.
- HIV Vaccine Trial Network, Community Convening
- National House & Ball Leadership Convening, a project of REACH L.A. 2011–Current.
- (TEACH) 2003–2004.
- Diori developed a governing body, made up of community organisations, parents, leaders and stakeholders in the KiKi ballroom scene, called The KiKi Coalition. It continues to meet monthly in NYC to discuss and tackle trending topics, strategies and updates on best practices for HIV/STI prevention and treatment in the KiKi community. Year-Current.
- New York City and New Jersey Council of Houses board member.
- Advisor for "Newark is Burning" New Jersey Performing Arts Center, theatrical performance about Ball culture. 2011.
- Evaluation development of House of Latex Ball and House of Latex Project Surveys. Created the framework for evaluating interventions.
- National Minority AIDS Council's United States Conference on AIDS, New Orleans, LA. "Effective Youth and Young Adult Prevention Leadership Programming in the Kiki House Ball Scene," 2013.

== Honors and awards ==
- AAOGC Marsha P. Johnson Lifetime Achievement Award For Community Leadership 2018
- House of Latex Ball's Ross Infinite Creativity Award, 2013.
- The NY State Department of Health's AIDS Institute's World AIDS Day 2012 Commissioner's Award for her HIV prevention intervention Stars of CHANGE for Kiki Ballroom House scene youth through Hetrick-Martin Institute.
- NYC Heritage of Pride for Most Outstanding Message and Contingent, Hetrick-Martin Institute, 2012.
- NYC Heritage of Pride for Best Political Message, Hetrick-Martin Institute, 2011.
- NYC Black Pride Heritage Award for Community Leadership, 2011.
- Project HEAT Kiki Ballroom Scene Community Mobilization Award, 2011.
- Hetrick-Martin Institute's Damien Staff Award, 2009.
- NYC Latex Ball's Legendary Women's Face, 2008 (Ballroom culture, honour, designation).
- Philadelphia Dorian Corey's Women's Face of the Year, 2007 (Ballroom culture honour).
- NYC Awards Ball's Women's Face of the Year, Mother of the Year, and Woman of the Year, 2005, 2006, 2007 (Ballroom culture honours).
- Pride in the city's Community Mobilization Award, 2005.
- Women Face of the Year, Woman of the Year, 2004 (Ballroom culture honour).
- House of Blahnik's Humanitarian of the Year Award, 2004.
- New York City Department of Health TEACH Award for Highest Honors in the HIV/AIDS Social Marketing Track, 2003.
- GMHC Soul Food Program Award for Effective Intervention for MSM of Color, 2000.
- The Izod Company Award for Outstanding Event Planning Concept, competition through Fashion Institute of Technology, 1999.
- Advertising Women of New York Award for Outstanding Scholastic Work in Advertising, 1998 and 1999.

== Promotions, communications and event planning ==
Diori has run social awareness campaigns at Hetrick-Martin Institute and GMHC including the You Are Loved campaign and the No Shade campaign, highlighting the importance of self-love and self-efficacy among LGBTQ youth. She also created Crystal Meth Campaigns, Soul Food Programs campaign, Transgender Health and Condom Kit campaigns targeted at LGBTQ communities, and promotional materials for outreach and program advertising through GMHC. Diori created advertising materials and event planning for Department of Health, Public Health Solutions.
