= Gotha: Ismailia Seneki =

1995 strategy video game

- Developer: Micronet
- Publisher: Sega
- Series: Gotha
- Platform: Sega Saturn
- Release: JP: January 27, 1995
- Genre: Turn-based strategy
- Mode: Single-player

Gotha: Ismailia Seneki (Note: Japanese: ゴータ ~イスマイリア戦役~, Hepburn: Gōta Isumairia Seneki; lit. "Gotha: Ismailia Campaign") is a 1995 turn-based strategy video game developed by Micronet and published by Sega exclusively in Japan for the Sega Saturn. The game was followed by the sequels Heir of Zendor: The Legend and The Land (Gotha II: Tenkuu no Kishi) in 1996 and Soukuu no Tsubasa: Gotha World in 1997.

== Gameplay ==
Gotha is a strategy game.

== Reception ==
Reception

Review scores
Publication	Score
Consoles +	80%
Famitsu	27/40
Mean Machines	73%
Next Generation	3/5
MAN!AC	62%
Sega Saturn Magazine	5.7/10

Next Generation reviewed the game, rating it three stars out of five, and stated that "As is, Gotha is a great tease, but not much more." While previewing the game as an import, GamePro found the overall graphics as "stunning," noting the photorealistic backgrounds as "gorgeous" and its polygon aircraft as an "imaginative mix" of science fiction design as in Star Wars and Flash Gordon. However, the magazine noted the language barrier would make its intricate strategy gameplay too difficult for most players who do not speak Japanese.
