= Aisha Naluzze Batala =

Ugandan lawyer and judge (born 1977)

- Born: 25 June 1977 (age 49); Mukono, Uganda
- Education: Makerere University; Law Development Centre; Uganda Management Institute
- Occupation: Legal practice
- Years active: 2003-present
- Title: Uganda's Inspector General of Government (IGG)
- Predecessor: Beti Olive Namisango Kamya-Turomwe

Aisha Naluzze Batala (born 1977) is a Ugandan lawyer and judge who currently serves as the Inspector General of Government (IGG) of Uganda. She was appointed by President Yoweri Kaguta Museveni in October 2025, replacing Beti Olive Namisango Kamya.

Before her appointment, she served as a judge in the Land Division of the High Court of Uganda.

== Early life ==
Aisha Naluzze Batala was born in 1977 in Uganda to Sheikh Abdul Obeid Kamulegeya and Hajjat Haliima Kamulegeya. She pursued her education in Uganda and showed an early interest in law and justice.

She attended Makerere University, where she obtained a Bachelor of Laws (LL.B.) degree. After completing her undergraduate studies, she joined the Law Development Centre (LDC) in Kampala, earning a Postgraduate Diploma in Legal Practice, which qualified her to practice law in Uganda.

She later enrolled at the Uganda Management Institute (UMI), where she earned a Master’s Degree in Management Studies.

== Career ==
Batala began her professional journey at F. Mukasa & Co. Advocates, where she worked as a Legal assistant between 2003 and 2005. She also served in the Land Division of the High Court of Uganda.

On 7 October 2025, President Yoweri Kaguta Museveni appointed her as the Inspector General of Government, replacing Beti Olive Namisango Kamya, who had served in the position since July 2021. Her appointment was confirmed by Faruk Kirunda, the Special Presidential Assistant for Press and Mobilization at the Office of the President.
