= Erer (Somali woreda) =

District in Somali Region, Ethiopia

Coordinates: 10°15′N 41°30′E

Erer (not to be confused with the Erer zone) is a woreda in Somali Region, Ethiopia. Part of the Shinile Zone, Erer is bordered on the south by Dire Dawa and Oromia Region, on the southwest by Afdem, on the northwest by the Afar Region, and on the east by Shinile.

Towns in Erer include Asibuli, Ayidora, Erer, and Hurso. The average elevation in this woreda is 824 meters above sea level. As of 2008, Erer has neither all-weather gravel roads nor community roads; about 16.51% of the total population has access to drinking water. Notable landmarks include Erer Gota, a rural estate created in 1923 for Ras Tafari by the Italian agronomist Pastorelli, which featured fruit trees and tropical plants. According to Richard Pankhurst, by 1929 the estate boasted "200,000 fruit trees, mainly oranges and tangerines, 60,000 coffee trees and 100,000 [grape] vines had been planted on an area of 80 hectares." The track of the Addis Ababa - Djibouti Railway crosses the southern part of this woreda along the lower slopes of the Amhar mountains.

== Demographics ==
Based on 2007 Census conducted by the Central Statistical Agency, the woreda had a total population of 100,556, of whom 53,198 are men and 47,358 women. While 17,039 are urban inhabitants, a further 83,517 were pastoralists. Also, the woreda has a reported total population of 77,628, of whom 42,461 are men and 35,167 women. While 12,657 or 16.31% are urban inhabitants, a further 45,766 or 58.96% are pastoralists. 97.79% of the population said they were Muslim, and 1.3% said they practiced Orthodox Christian. This woreda is inhabited primarily inhabited by the issa and the Gurgura.

The 1997 national census reported a total population for this woreda of 77,960, of whom 42,247 were men and 35,713 were women; 10,637 or 13.64% of its population were urban dwellers. (This total also includes an estimate for the inhabitants of 10 rural kebeles, which were not counted; they were estimated to have 4650 inhabitants, of whom 2630 were men and 2020 women.) The largest ethnic group reported in Erer was the Somali.

== Agriculture ==
As part of a sample enumeration performed by the Central Statistical Agency, in 2001 it had interviewed a total of 2870 farmers in the woreda, who held an average of 0.4 hectares of land. Of the 1143 hectares of private land surveyed, 85.47% was under cultivation, 1.92% pasture, 7.7% fallow, and 4.81% was devoted to other uses; the percentage in woodland was missing. For the land surveyed in this woreda, 57.13% is planted in cereals like teff, sorghum and maize, 1.66% in root crops and 1.14% in vegetables; the number for pulses is missing. Permanent crops included 80 hectares planted in khat, 121 in coffee, and 198.52 in fruit trees. 64.63% of the farmers both raise crops and livestock, while 9.02% only grow crops and 26.34% only raise livestock. Land tenure in this woreda is distributed amongst 93.77% own their land, 2.22% rent, and the remaining 4.01% held their land under other forms of tenure.
