= Aisha (British singer) =

- Born: Pamela Ross; 1962 (age 63–64); Wolverhampton, England
- Origin: United Kingdom
- Genres: Reggae, dub
- Labels: Ariwa, Twinkle
- Formerly of: Mad Professor

Pamela Ross (born 1962), known professionally as Aisha, or sometimes Sister Aisha, is a British roots reggae singer.

== Biography ==
Aisha's father ran a sound system, and she began singing at the age of eight, building up a strong local following before beginning her recording career. At the age of sixteen, she met Lippy, who owned the Locks City sound system, and she sang over the system's dub plates. In 1979, she successfully auditioned for the band Capital Letters as a backing vocalist. She went solo in 1984 and was soon introduced to Mad Professor, and after a few singles, Mad Professor produced her debut album, High Priestess (1988). A second album, Daughters of Zion appeared in 1993, with further albums in the years that followed, Aisha also working with Norman Grant of The Twinkle Brothers on two albums. She also featured on the Roots Daughters series of albums, alongside artists such as Kofi, Fabian, and Sandra Cross. She first performed in Jamaica in 2000 at the Augustus Pablo Benefit concert, and her debut performance in the United States came in 2004. She performed at the 2003 Meltdown festival (curated by Lee "Scratch" Perry) at London's Royal Festival Hall, which saw The Daily Telegraph describe her as "the closest we have to a female Bob Marley". In 2006, she toured internationally with Mad Professor's Ariwa Posse.

== Discography ==
- High Priestess (1988) Ariwa
- Daughters of Zion (1993) Twinkle
- True Roots (1994) Ariwa
- Raise Your Voice (1996) Twinkle
- There is More to Life (2005) Ariwa
