= Ayesha River =

Location
- Country: Ethiopia

Ayesha River is an intermittent river found in Eastern Ethiopia. Its drainage basin is part of the East African Rift.

== Overview ==
The Ethiopian Ministry of Water Resources has included the drainage area of the Ayesha among the list of twelve major basins in the country. It has an area of 2,223 square kilometers, but characterized with a lack of any measurable flow.
