= Ayşe Sultan =

Ayşe Sultan or Ayşe Hatun may refer to:

== People ==
- Ayşe Sultan (daughter of Bayezid II) (c. 1465 – c. 1515)
- Ayşe Gülbahar Hatun (mother of Selim I) (c. 1453 – c. 1505), concubine of Bayezid II
- Ayşe Hafsa Sultan (1478/1479 – 1534), concubine of Sultan Selim I, mother of Suleiman the Magnificent
- Ayşe Hatun (consort of Selim I) (c. 1476 – 1539)
- Ayşe Hümaşah Sultan (1541 – c. 1589), daughter of Mihrimah Sultan
- Ayşe Sultan (daughter of Murad III) (1565–1605)
- Ayşe Sultan (daughter of Ahmed I) (c. 1605 – 1657)
- Ayşe Sultan (Haseki of Osman II) (c. 1607 – c. 1640)
- Ayşe Sultan (Haseki of Murad IV) (died c. 1680)
- Ayşe Sultan (daughter of Mustafa II) (1696–1752), also called Büyük Ayşe
- Ayşe Sultan (daughter of Ahmed III) (1715–1776), also called Küçuk Ayşe
- Ayşe Sultan (daughter of Abdul Hamid II) (1887–1960), also called Ayşe Osmanoğlu

== Fictional characters ==
- Ayşe Hatun, a Kuruluş: Osman character

== See also ==
- Aisha Sultan Begum, Timurid princess and Mughal queen
