= Gotha, Ethiopia =

Gotha
- Location in Ethiopia
- Coordinates: 9°31′N 41°20′E
- Country: Ethiopia
- Region: Somali
- Zone: Shinile
- Elevation: 1,185 m (3,888 ft)

Population (2005)
  - Total: 869

Gotha (also known as Gota) is a settlement in east-central Ethiopia. Located in the Shinile Zone of the Somali Region. Gotha is served by a station on the Addis Ababa - Djibouti Railway.

== Demographics ==
As of 2005, the population of Lasarat has been estimated to be 869. The city inhabitants belong to various mainly Afro-Asiatic-speaking ethnic groups, with the Issa Somali predominant.
