= Aisha Association for Women and Child Protection =

Independent Palestinian women organization

AISHA Association for Women and Child Protection (AISHA), established in 2009, is an independent Palestinian women's organization working to achieve gender integration through economic empowerment and psychosocial support to marginalized groups. The organization works in the Gaza Strip with focus on Gaza City and the Northern area.

AISHA seeks to protect and help women and children from violence through raising awareness of relevant psychological, social, legal, and economic issues. AISHA also focuses on advocacy, creating and raising awareness of domestic violence, gender equality, and feminist issues among local community leaders and organizations. AISHA specifically focuses on women with disabilities and women-headed displaced households, children of these women aged 6–12 years, families of women who are victims of violence, school counselors, teachers, doctors, and psychosocial service providers.

== History ==
Between 1996 and 2009, AISHA operated under the name "Women Empowerment Program (WEP)" as the women department within the Gaza Community Mental Health Program (GCHMP).

Given the expanding scope of the GCHMP, a restructuring process took place by which the WEP evolved into an independent organization, AISHA. AISHA was under the administrative and financial umbrella of GCMHP until December 31, 2010.

On Wednesday, 16 January 2013, the Gaza city head office of the association was the subject of a break-in by unknown assailants.

== Projects ==
=== Empowerment of Violated Women and those at Risk ===
AISA's first project was implemented from April to December 2011. It provided vocational training for seventy women in sewing, beauty services, ceramics, knitting, and video. As part of the project, the beneficiaries received psycho-support.

=== Protecting Violated Women ===
Protecting Violated Women was implemented from February to December 2011. Twenty eight women received services that included individual and group guidance, vocational training and supervision. The project included home visits to the trainees to check on their conditions and for follow-up after completion of training, in addition to the family guidance visits conducted during the project. The project gave an opportunity for additional outside training, and worked with each participant to check on future planning and thinking in income-yielding projects.

=== Legal Assistance and Enabling Vulnerable Groups in Gaza Strip ===
The third project was implemented from April to November 2011 in the Governorate of Gaza. The project raised legal awareness among the public in the Gaza strip and aimed to improve legal assistance services.

The project was part of a UN effort, represented by the UNDP, to reduce the effects of embargo and the war on Gaza, which has resulted in poverty and unemployment. The project worked to ensure the right of litigation as a constitutional right, and to enhance the rule of law. The project provided legal education, legal consultation and mediation, and legal representation (including for litigation and arbitration) to vulnerable groups.

The project was in partnership with five other associations: Al-Atta Association, Women's Affairs Center, Culture and Free Thought Forum, Women's Programs Union, Coalition for Justice and the National Association for Democracy and Law.

=== Improving Palestinian Social Awareness and Ability to Address Issues of Gender Equality ===
This project comprised two parts.

The first part was implemented from January 2011 until April 2012 in the Governorate of Gaza in partnership with the Palestinian Center for Democracy and Conflicts Resolution.

It educated 1500 children from the preparatory stage in UNRWA schools, 500 citizens, and 160 initiative coordinators from the schools on gender issues and violence. The project consisted of education sessions and discussion meetings. Also, the school coordinators were trained to increase their efficiency in the teaching of gender equality issues. Topics covered included school violence, the protection of children from exploitation, and gender and child rights.

The project consisted of education sessions for the group with discussion meetings between them in addition to training for the initiative guides and coordinators in the schools in order to increase their efficiency in teaching the children on gender equality issues. Among the topics were: school violence, protection of children from exploitation, gender and child rights.

The second part of the project was implemented December 2011 until May 2012 in the Governorate of Gaza in partnership with the Wefaq Society for Woman and Child Care.

It was a social education campaign about violence against women, its implications, and the mechanisms for intervention to protect violated women. The project targeted 720 people through 36 training workshops of 5 sessions each, of which three were psycho-social and two legal.

=== Project for Patients of Occupational Therapy and Rehabilitation ===
The fifth project was implemented from May to December 2011 in partnership with the Gaza Mental Health Program. The project gave vocational training to occupational therapy and rehabilitation patients.
