= Adigala =

Adigala Hadhagala
- Town
- Location in Ethiopia
- Coordinates: 10°25′N 42°14′E
- Country: Ethiopia
- Region: Somali
- Zone: Sitti Zone
- Established: 1902

Government
  - Type: Ethiopia
  - Qalib Giire: Mouhoumed Mijacase
- Elevation: 766 m (2,513 ft)

Population (2022)
  - Total: 98,522

Hadhagaala or Adigala (Somali: Adhigale) is a small town in north-eastern Ethiopia. It is served by a station on the narrow gauge Ethio-Djibouti Railways. The railway reached Adigale in 1902. The station is about 100 km inside Ethiopia from the border with Djibouti.

== Water Pipeline ==
The town is the base for the Chinese funded Ethiopia-Djibouti cross border potable water project. The water project is funded by the Exim bank of China and is constructed by Chinese company CGCOC. The project is expected to launch towards the end of 2017 and will supply groundwater to the Djibouti towns of Ali Sabieh, Dikhil, Arta and Djibouti City.

== See also ==
- Railway stations in Ethiopia
