= Shinile =

Town in Somali Region, Ethiopia

- Town
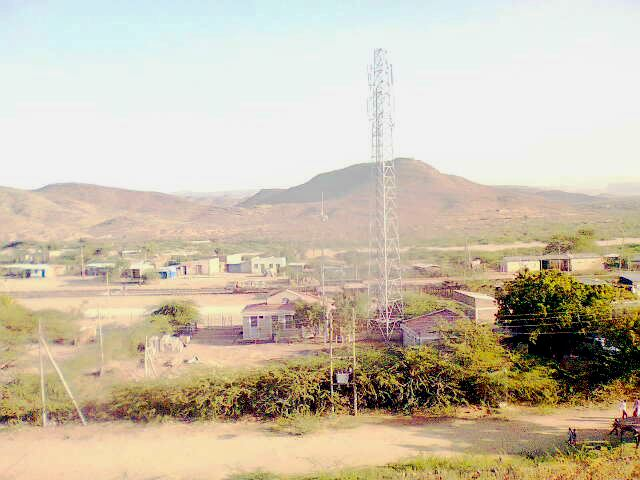

- Location within Ethiopia
- Coordinates: 9°40′N 41°50′E
- Country: Ethiopia
- Region: Somali
- Zone: Sitti Zone
- District: Shinile

Government
  - Type: Chartered City
- Elevation: 10,000 m (33,000 ft)

Population (2024)
  - Total: 110.000
- Time zone: UTC+3 (EAT)

Shinile (Somali: Shiniile) is a town in eastern Ethiopia. Located in the Sitti Zone of the Somali Region, it is 9 km northeast of Dire Dawa, the first station of the Ethio-Djibouti Railways east of Dire Dawa is at Shinile.

== Demographics ==
The town's inhabitants belong to various mainly Afro-Asiatic-speaking ethnic group, the mixed Somali predominant. Based on figures from the Central Statistical Agency in 2005, Shinile has an estimated total population of 207,367. The 1997 census reported this town had a total population of 8,809 of whom 4,464 were men and 4,345 women. The three largest ethnic groups reported in this town were the Issa Somali (96.58%), the Oromo (1.76%), and the Amhara (1.5%); all other ethnic groups made up the remaining 0.16% of the residents. It is the largest of four towns in Shinile woreda.

== Climate ==
Shinile has a hot semi-arid climate (BSh) in Köppen-Geiger system.

Climate data for Shinile
Month	Jan	Feb	Mar	Apr	May	Jun	Jul	Aug	Sep	Oct	Nov	Dec	Year
Mean daily maximum °C (°F)	28.6 (83.5)	29.4 (84.9)	31.7 (89.1)	31.7 (89.1)	33.5 (92.3)	35.0 (95.0)	34.1 (93.4)	33.5 (92.3)	33.5 (92.3)	32.5 (90.5)	30.3 (86.5)	28.8 (83.8)	31.9 (89.4)
Mean daily minimum °C (°F)	15.1 (59.2)	16.9 (62.4)	19.2 (66.6)	19.9 (67.8)	21.1 (70.0)	22.9 (73.2)	22.0 (71.6)	21.3 (70.3)	21.7 (71.1)	19.0 (66.2)	16.2 (61.2)	15.1 (59.2)	19.2 (66.6)
Average rainfall mm (inches)	18 (0.7)	28 (1.1)	62 (2.4)	90 (3.5)	46 (1.8)	22 (0.9)	80 (3.1)	113 (4.4)	62 (2.4)	18 (0.7)	13 (0.5)	5 (0.2)	557 (21.7)
Source: Climate-Data.org
