= Sitti Zone =

Zone in Somali Region of Ethiopia

Coordinates: 10°15′N 42°00′E

Sitti Zone Gobolka Sitti
- Zone
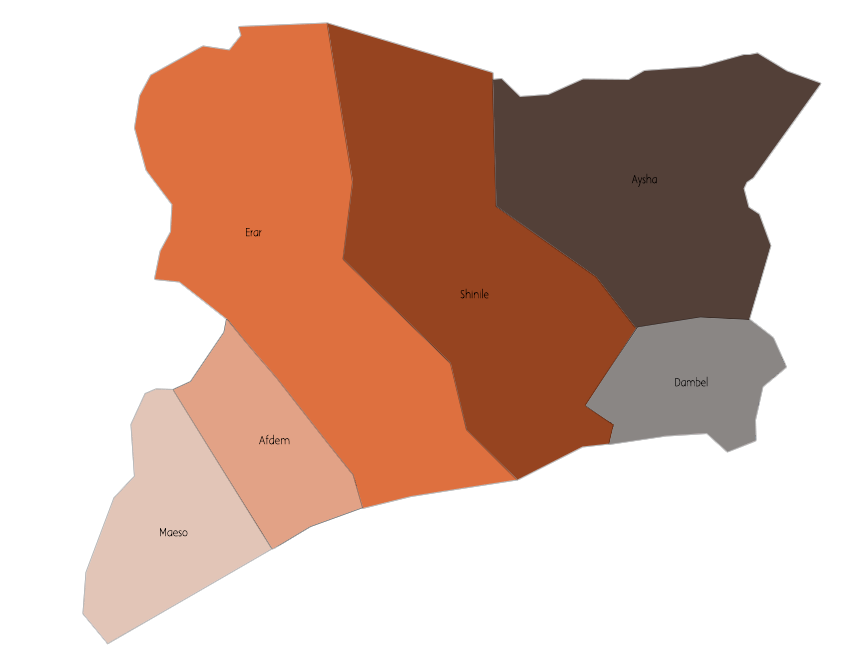
- Map of Sitti Zone

- Map showing Somali Region in Ethiopia
- Country: Ethiopia
- Region: Somali
- Zone: Sitti
- Capital: Shinile

Area
  - Total: 56,626 km^{2} (21,863 sq mi)

Population (2014-2017)
  - Total: 3,546,168
- Time zone: UTC+3 (EAT)

Sitti Zone (Somali: Gobolka Sitti), formerly known as Shinile, is a zone in Somali Region of Ethiopia.

Located at the northwestern point of the Somali Region and stretching across the savanna north of the Ahmar Mountains, Sitti is bordered on the south by Dire Dawa and the Oromia Region, on the west by the Afar Region, on the north by Djibouti, on the east by Somaliland, and on the southeast by Fafan Zone. Other towns and cities in this zone include Aysha, Shinile, Dewele, Harewa, Adigale, Erer, Bike and Āfdem. Part of the northwestern corner is occupied by the Yangudi Rassa National Park, which is a notable local landmark.

== Climate ==
The Sitti Zone has colder winters than the highlands, while the lowlands has milder winters. The region elevation is the major factor in temperature levels, with the higher areas, on average, as 17 °C (62 °F) cooler, day or night. Hot summer days are tempered by the low relative humidity and cooler evenings during summer months since, for most of the state, the highest diurnal difference in temperature is often in the summer.

The annual mean statistics for some Sitti Zone centres is shown below:

Town	Min. Temp	Max. Temp	Rainfall
Shinile	15.1 °C (59.2 °F)	35.0 °C (95.0 °F)	557 mm (21.9 in)
Dewele	15.9 °C (60.6 °F)	36.9 °C (98.4 °F)	208 mm (8.2 in)
Bike	14.5 °C (58.1 °F)	34.1 °C (93.4 °F)	660 mm (26 in)
Āfdem	14.5 °C (58.1 °F)	34.7 °C (94.5 °F)	649 mm (25.6 in)
Aysha	16.6 °C (61.9 °F)	37.3 °C (99.1 °F)	223 mm (8.8 in)

== Demographics ==
Ethnic groups of Sitti Zone
1. Somali (97.0%)
2. Oromo (1.42%)
3. Amhara (1.34%)
4. Other (0.24%)

Based on the 2017 Census conducted by the Central Statistical Agency of Ethiopia (CSA), this Zone has a total population of 750,320 of whom 324,120 are men and 326,200 women. While 286,493 are urban inhabitants, a further 463,827 were pastoralists. The total population of the Sitti Zone according to the 2014-2017 Ethiopian Census was 546,168.

Based on the 2007 Census conducted by the Central Statistical Agency of Ethiopia (CSA), this Zone has a total population of 457,086 of whom 246,302 are men and 210,784 women. While 64,263 or 14.06% are urban inhabitants, a further 203,285 or 44.47% were pastoralists. Two largest ethnic groups reported in Sitti were the Somalis (97.03%) and Amhara (1.42%); all other ethnic groups made up 1.55% of the population. Somali language is spoken as a first language by 96.91%, Amharic by 1.36%, and Oromo by 1.34%; the remaining 0.39% spoke all other primary languages reported. 98.35% of the population said they were Muslim.

The 1994 national census reported a total population for this Zone of 205,180 of whom 121,094 were men and 84,086 were women; 14.88% of its population were urban dwellers. The largest ethnic group reported in Shinile was the Somali (95%); a similar share spoke Somali (95%). Only 12,085 or 3.4% were literate.

According to a May 24, 2004 World Bank memorandum, none of the inhabitants of Sitti have access to electricity, this zone has a road density of 17.3 kilometers per 1000 square kilometers, the average rural household has 1.2 hectare of land (compared to the national average of 1.01 hectare of land and an average of 2.25 for pastoral Regions) and the equivalent of 1.4 heads of livestock. The memorandum gave this zone a drought risk rating of 387.

The Sitti Zone is one of the regional administrative zones in the Somali Region. The majority of the Zone's population are pastoralists from the Issa subclan of the Dir who make up the majority clan in the Zone. In addition, there is a large agro-pastoral population in the Zone almost exclusively from the Gurgura and Gadabuursi subclans of the Dir, both whom represent the majority inhabitants of the Erer and Dembel districts respectively, and from the Gugundhabe and Karanle Hawiye clans who inhabit the Mieso district.

The Nutrition Assessment in Agro-Pastoral areas of Shinile, Dambal and Errer Districts Somali Region (2004) states concerning the demographics of the Sitti Zone:

"The population in these districts is made up of different Somali groups. The Issa, the majority of whom are pastoralists, are the dominant clan in the Shinile zone. The Gurgura, Gadabursi and Hawiya are mainly agro-pastoral and inhabit the Erer, Dambal and Mieso districts respectively."

== Agriculture ==
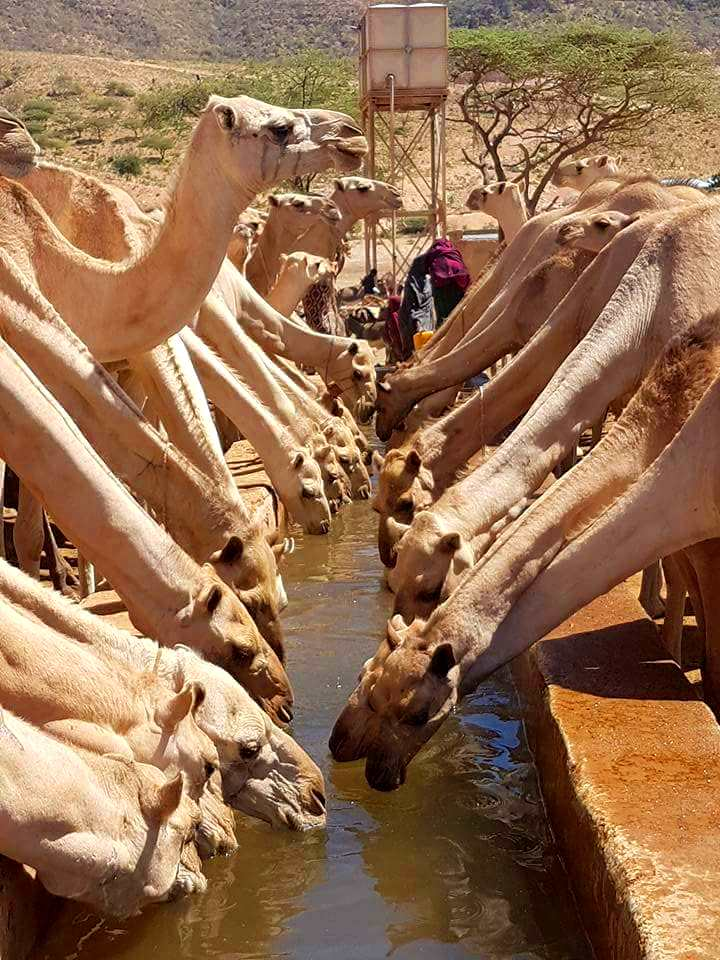
Camels watering hole near Hadigale.

From 5 to 23 November 2003, the CSA conducted the first ever national agricultural census, of which the livestock census was an important component. For the Somali Region, the CSA generated estimated figures for the livestock population (cattle, sheep, goats, camels, and equids) and their distribution by commissioning an aerial survey. For the Sitti Zone, their results included:

Animal	Estimated total	Number per km^{2}
Cattle	207,472	6.8
Sheep	670,956	49.5 (including goats)
Goats	849,451	49.5 (including sheep)
Camels	103,052	3.4
Asses	16,138	0.5 (all equids)
Mules	191	0.5 (all equids)
Horses	0	
