= Djibouti Ports & Free Zones Authority =

Government agency of Djibouti

Coordinates: 11.6053°N 43.1392°E

- Type: Government Authority
- Industry: Logistics, transportation, free-trade zone
- Founded: 2004
- Headquarters: Djibouti, Djibouti, East Africa
- Key people: Aboubaker Omar Hadi, Chairman
- Services: Container terminals, cargo handling, bunkering, transport maintenance and free trade zone management
- Website: www.djibouti-portsfz.dj www.dpfza.gov.dj

The Djibouti Ports & Free Zones Authority (DPFZA) is the governmental body of Djibouti that administers and manages the Port of Djibouti and several other facilities in the country. The DPFZA also oversees the management of Djibouti International Free Trade Zone, serving as a liaison between the companies based there and other governmental agencies. The DPFZA reports directly to the Presidential Office.

== Overview ==
The Djibouti Ports & Free Zones Authority is the governing authority that sets the rules, directives and overarching principles for ports and free zones in Djibouti. The mandate of the DPFZA is:

- Promote Djibouti's ports and free zones
- Establishment of a business friendly environment with a business oriented legal framework
- Regulate Djibouti's ports through the board of directors.
- Develop new ports and free zones.

== History and development ==
Djibouti’s location, linking the Suez Canal, the Gulf of Aden and the inland countries of the Horn of Africa led to increased port and shipping activity in the region. The World Bank estimates that Djibouti will maintain a 7% rate of growth in 2017. This economic outlook is strengthened by large-scale investment in construction and infrastructure in Djibouti and the wider East Africa region.

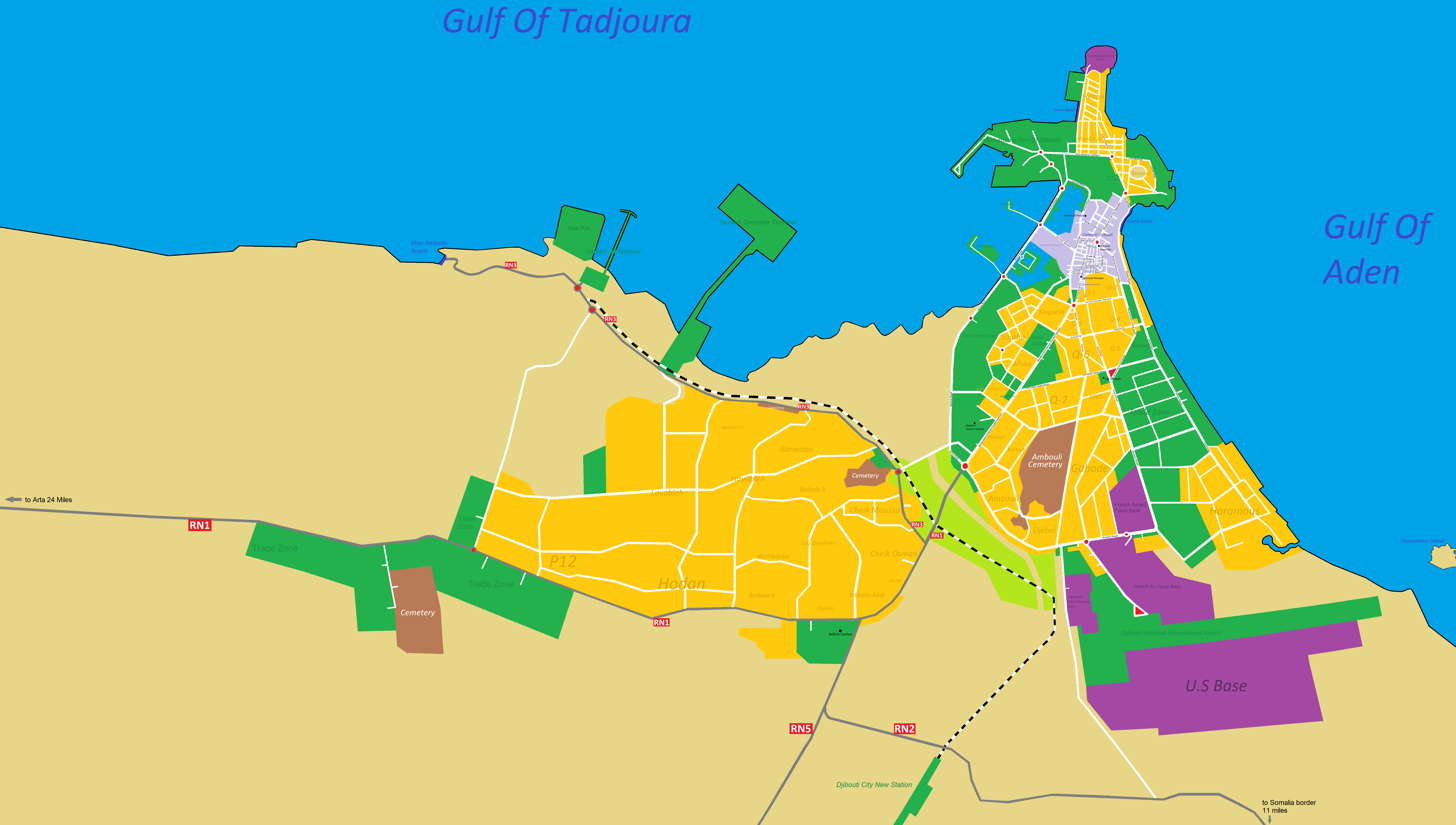
Map districts of Djibouti City and Balbala.

The Djibouti Ports & Free Zones Authority contributes to and leads several of these projects. The DPFZA's highly trained staff coordinate with government agencies and international partners to focus Djibouti’s strategic development, support the flow of capital investment, and manage the construction railways, airports and power plants. Fast-paced growth has led to an increase in competition and a diversification of consumer markets, which is transforming the economy in the long-term. In turn, financial institutions, such as the Central Bank of Djibouti (Banque Centrale de Djibouti, BCD) is working with its partners to develop new regulation, frameworks and technological solutions to support growth, manage risk and promote increased corporate and financial activity.

== Chairman of the DPFZA ==
Aboubaker Omar Hadi has served as the Chairman of the Djibouti Ports & Free Zones Authority (DPFZA) since July 2, 2011. His career has spanned over 30 years, beginning in the Port of Djibouti where he worked in the Marine Department and Port Control and was responsible for port documentation in 1978. Throughout his career, he has also served as Deputy Manager in the statistics department, General Cargo Manager, Container Terminal Manager and Commercial Director of the port. Aboubaker Omar Hadi has been instrumental in improving trade relations between Djibouti and Ethiopia, to the extent where the neighbouring country now uses Djibouti's ports for over 90% of its foreign trade. More recently he has led the expansion of Djibouti's ports and free zones as the nation strives to become the commercial trade hub of East Africa. Aboubaker Omar Hadi completed his First Degree in Ports and Multimodal Transport from Le Conservatoire Nationale des Arts et Metiers, in France, and also holds a master's degree in Ports and Shipping Administration from the World Maritime University of Sweden.

== Projects ==
The Djibouti Ports and Free Zones Authority (DPFZA) engages in projects with renowned global partners to strengthen Djibouti’s role as a logistics and infrastructure hub. Its strategic position grants vessels and cargo direct access to strategic passages, such as the Suez Canal. Its proximity to developing landlocked economies such as Ethiopia provides opportunities for bilateral and multi-lateral cooperation. In fact, Djibouti-Ethiopia relations has been praised as a model of regional integration. Djibouti launched a $15 billion expansion program, which includes the development of airports, highways, and other key national infrastructure projects. In support of this growth, commercial institutions like the Djibouti International Free Trade Zone and the Silk Road International Bank have been set up to modernize existing services, and facilitate the development of these projects.

=== Addis Ababa-Djibouti Railway ===
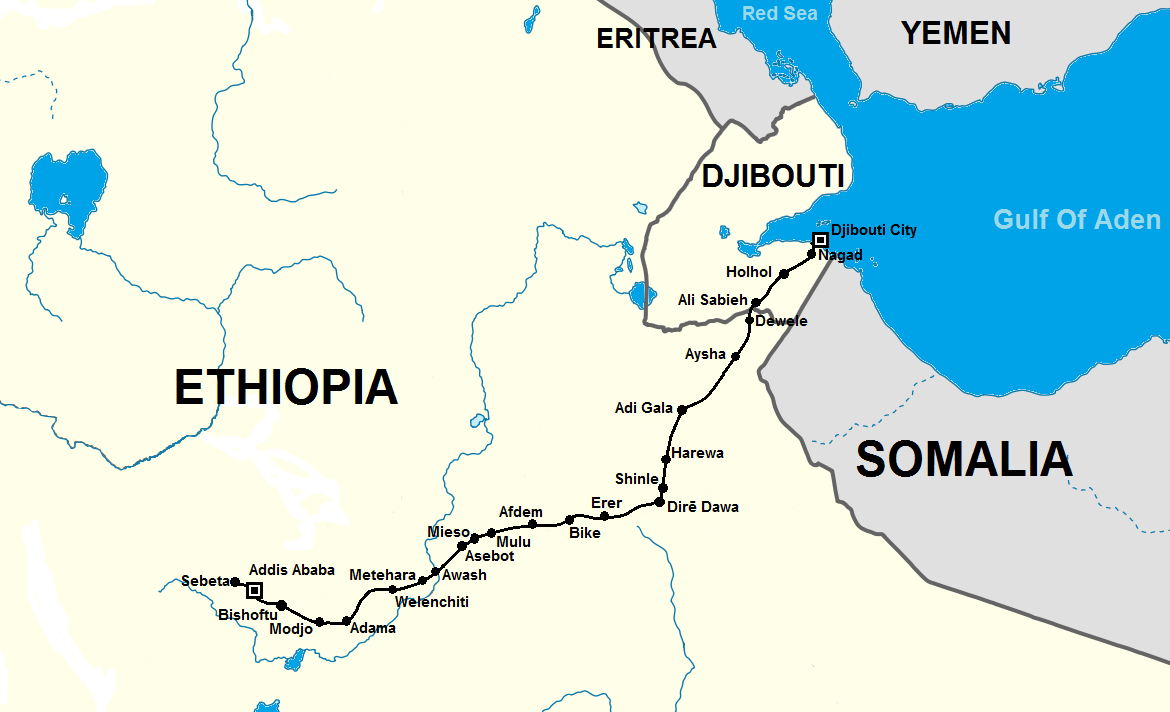
The map of Addis Ababa-Djibouti Railway

The Addis Ababa–Djibouti Railway is a standard gauge international railway that links Addis Ababa with the port of Djibouti on the Gulf of Aden, providing landlocked Ethiopia with railroad access to the sea. In 2016, more than 95% of Ethiopia's trade passed through Djibouti. China Railway Group and the China Civil Engineering Construction Corporation started construction on the railway in 2011, and were financed by the Exim Bank of China, the China Development Bank, and the Industrial and Commercial Bank of China. The project was completed in 2016, with a total investment of $4 billion, making the electrified train a key element of the Belt and Road Initiative.

== International Free Trade Zone ==
The Djibouti International Free Trade Zone (DIFTZ) will transform trade in the region and provide a strategic base for global businesses to access the rapidly growing African market. Construction of DIFTZ began a week after the completion of the Addis Ababa-Djibouti Railway, a new 752 km track linking Ethiopia’s capital with the Port of Djibouti. The Djibouti Ports & Free Zones Authority partnered with China Merchants Group, Dalian Port Authority and IZP to form the DIFTZ Project Preparatory Group. Together, they began the construction on the $3.5 billion dollar free-trade zone, which extends over 4,800 hectares. The initiative is expected to create 200,000 new jobs, and cement Djibouti’s role as the strategic link between global maritime trade routes in the Belt and Road Initiative.

== Ports and facilities ==
In coordination with Djibouti’s government agencies, the DPFZA oversees the construction, management and administration of several ports and facilities.

=== Port of Djibouti ===
The Port of Djibouti – also known as the Red Sea Port – facilitates the transit of around 30,000 vessels every year. The Djibouti Ports & Free Zones Authority supports the port’s activities by linking it to the Doraleh Multipurpose Port, Liquefied Natural Gas (LNG) and oil terminal, and two additional ports dedicated to Salt and Potash.

=== Horizon Terminal (HDTL) ===
The Horizon Djibouti Terminal is equipped to meet the demands of petroleum trade and shipping, with a storage capacity of 371,000 cubic meters, loading bays and equipment capable of fulfilling local, regional and contango (Trading) needs. The Horizon Djibouti Terminal was constructed in response to rapid economic developments in East Africa - such as the spread of independent oil companies and increased logistical activities. The HDTL’s facilities are expected to evolve with the changing landscape of maritime shipping of petroleum, and adapt to offer services that meet the traditional and unpredictable demands of Africa’s natural resource sector.

=== Port statistics ===
Name	Investment	Capacity	Employment	Complete	Function
Port of Tadjourah	$78 million	4 million tons per year	Construction: 300 Operation:200	2017	Export of Potash
Port of Goubet	$64 million	5 million tons per year	Construction: 600 Operation: 200	2017	Export of Salt and Gypsum
Doraleh Multi-Purpose Port	$590 million	8,779,000 tons per year	Construction: 300 Operation: 800	2017	Container and Bulk Terminal
Horizon Djibouti Terminals	$200 million	371,000 cubic meters	Construction: 400 Operation: 200	2005	Crude Oil Storage, Refinement and Export
Damerjog Livestock Port	$70 million	10 million heads of livestock per year	Construction: 400 Operation: 400	2017	Livestock Storage and Transport
Ship Repair & Dry-docks	$200 million		Construction: 1000 Operation: 200	2018	Transport Maintenance
LNG Terminal	$2.8 billion	10 million cubic meters	Construction: 600 Operation: 200	2019	Liquefied Natural Gas Storage and Export

== Services ==
The Djibouti Ports & Free Zones Authority offers a mix of commercial and non-commercial services, in coordination with the relevant government agencies.

=== Company set up ===
Djibouti Ports & Free Zones Authority regulates the procedures for setting up a company in Djibouti. Applicants can obtain a license to operate through the authority. The DPFZA also processes work permits for foreign workers and facilitates applications concurrently with companies.

=== Transport and logistics licensing ===
The Djibouti Ports & Free Zones Authority performs administrative functions, such as compliance and performance audits, regulates cost frameworks for maritime and freight shipping, and issues the necessary licenses for companies operating within Djibouti or its ports.

=== Non-commercial services ===
The Djibouti Ports & Free Zones Authority processes applications for:

- Residence permits
- Visa clearance
- Driver's license
- Vehicle registration.
- Building permit

== See also ==
- List of ports and harbours of the Indian Ocean
- Port of Djibouti
- Rail transport in Djibouti
- Red Sea Airlines
- Addis Ababa-Djibouti Railway
- Djibouti
