= List of countries by rail transport network size =

This is a sortable list of countries by rail transport network size based on length of rail lines. For the purposes of this page, railway has been defined as a fixed route laid with rails along which wagons can be transported. Wagons may be powered by various means and may be used to transport people or goods.

Temporary lines laid for specific purposes are not considered unless specified. Countries include the nations listed in the List of sovereign states along with reference ISO 3166 codes which list ISO 3166-1 numeric three-digit country codes which are maintained by the United Nations Statistics Division.

== Countries with largest railway networks ==
Operational length in km:
1. United States: 220,044 (17.3%)
2. China: 165,000 (12.9%)
3. Russia: 105,000 (8.24%)
4. India: 70,117 (5.50%)
5. Canada: 49,422 (3.88%)
6. Germany: 33,351 (2.62%)
7. Australia: 32,924 (2.58%)
8. Brazil: 29,817 (2.34%)
9. France: 27,483 (2.16%)
10. Japan: 27,311 (2.14%)
11. Italy: 24,567 (1.93%)
12. Mexico: 23,389 (1.83%)
13. South Africa: 20,953 (1.64%)
14. Ukraine: 19,787 (1.55%)
15. Poland: 19,663 (1.54%)
16. Others: 405,791 (31.8%)

Country/Territory	Length (km)		% of the total electrified	(per route km)		Historical peak length (km)	Nationalized or private (Note: This refers to both track ownership and train operation)	Data year	References	ISO 3166-1
Country/Territory	Total	Electrified	% of the total electrified	Area (km^{2})	Population	Historical peak length (km)	Nationalized or private	Data year	References	ISO 3166-1
United States	220,044	2,150 (Note: This figure is the sum of the electrified lengths of the following railways: Amtrak (735 km), Deseret Power Railway (53 km), Iowa Traction Railway (9 km), Long Island Rail Road (237 km), Metra (99 km), Metro-North Railroad (255 km), NJ Transit Rail Operations (159 km), SEPTA Regional Rail (277 km) and Caltrain (82 km).)	0.97%	44.69	1,522	428,180 (1917)	Track ownership and freight mostly private, passenger mostly public	2019		840
China	165,000	122,000	74.40%	60.61	8,865	165,000 (2025)	Nationalized, with a number of industrial lines owned by private companies	2025		156
Russia	92,000	48,000	53%	162.84	1,367	98,000 (1991)	Mostly nationalised, with some private industrial lines	2023		643
India	70,591	70,459	99.8%	47.93	21,038	70,591 (2026)	Nationalized, with some private freight operators.	2026		356
Canada	49,422	129	0.20%	214.48	674	69,636 (1940)	Freight - private Passenger - public	2017		124
Germany	39,773	21,100	53.1%	10.72	2,482	61,498 (1910)	Nationalized with private operators	2021		276
South Africa	35,953	29,212	81.13%	58.28	2,577		Nationalized	2017		710
Australia	32,924	3,448	10.47%	231.91	742	41,843 (1962)	Both	2022		036
Brazil	29,817	432	1.6%	299.6	7,225	38,000 (1957)	Both (Note: Freight operated by private on public tracks commuter and metro operated by state)	2014		076
France	27,483	16,067	58.46%	22.78	2,374	63,000 (1923)	Nationalized	2019		250
Japan	27,311	20,534	75.19%	13.84	4,647		Both	2015		392
Italy	24,567	12,205	49.68%	15.03	3,026		Infrastructure nationalized with private operators.	2023		
Mexico	23,389	802	3.43%	114.43	6,697	26,914	Majority of infrastructure nationalized. Private and public operators	2020		484
Ukraine	19,787	9,319	47.1%	28.81	2,140		Nationalized	2019		804
Poland	19,663	12,250	62.3%	16.28	2,001	27,000 (1954)	Nationalized with private operators	2024		616
Argentina	17,866	190	0.51%	77.45	1,117	47,500 (1957)	Both	2019		032
Iran	16,998	2,200	12.94%	148.41	6,816		Nationalized	2014		364
Kazakhstan	16,636	4,500	27.05%	164	1,232		Nationalized	2026		398
Spain	16,355 (Note: The Spanish railway network comprises the 11,934.3 km of the ADIF network (6,706.4 of them are electrified), the 3,455.7 electrified km of the ADIF AV network, the electrified Catalan FGC (253.4 km) and the electrified Metro networks of Madrid (293 km), Barcelona (166 km), Valencia (156.4 km), Bilbao (51 km), Seville (18 km), Palma (15.6 km) and Málaga (12 km).)	11,127	68.03%	31.73	2,920	18,000+ (in 1950s)	Nationalized with private operators	2017		724
United Kingdom	16,179 (Note: This figure is a combination of the Great British (15,846 km) and Northern Irish (333 km) networks.)	6,200 (Note: This is the figure for Great Britain, as Northern Ireland does not have any electrified railways.)	38.32%	15.10	4,178	34,075 (1929) (Note: This figure is a combination of the British (20,419 mi) and Northern Irish (754 mi) networks in 1929. This gives a total of 21,173 mi, which is 34,075 km.)	State-owned infrastructure with passenger operations mainly now publicly run with a handful of open access and contracted operators in Great Britain and publicly run in Northern Ireland.	2023		826
Turkey	13,919	7,274	52.3%	76	7,821		Nationalized	2024		792
Myanmar	11,025	0	0.00%	171.07	12,127		Nationalized	2006		104
Sweden	10,912	8,186	75.02%	41	958	16,900 (around 1938)	Nationalized with private operators Most services subject to franchising.	2021		752
Romania	10,611	4,032	32.87%	22.13	1,823	23,955 (Note: The figure is mentioned as the total network length in 1990, but the total network length may have grown after 1990.)	Nationalized with private operators	2024		642
Czech Republic	9,567	3,237	33.84%	8.24	1,106		Nationalized with private operators	2017		203
Indonesia	8,260	621	7.51%	219.31	32,712	8,260	Nationalized	2023		360
Cuba	8,193	117	1.4%	21.84	2,215	14,152	Nationalized	2010		192
Hungary	7,945	2,889	36.36%	11.71	1,233		Nationalized with private operators	2017		348
Pakistan	7,540	0	0.00%	117.74	32,433	9,629 (1947)	Nationalized, some trains are outsourced	2015		586
Egypt	7,024	62	0.88%	153.43	13,888		Nationalized	2017		818
Chile	6,634	700	10.55%	128.2	2,931	8,930 (1930)	Nationalized	2018		152
Sudan	6,084	0	0.00%	339.81	5,640		Nationalized	2006		729
Finland	5,926	3,270	55.18%	57.06	929		Nationalized	2017		246
North Korea	5,735	3,894	67.9%	23.03	4,595		Nationalized	2006		408
Saudi Arabia	5,590	453	8.10%	384.56	6,254		Nationalized	2019		682
Belarus	5,459	874	16.01%	38.03	1,741		Nationalized	2016		112
Switzerland	5,317	5,317	100.00%	7.76	1,631	5,868 (1930)	Both, but majority is nationalized	2020		756
Turkmenistan	5,080	0	0.00%	153.44	1,585		Nationalized	2014		795
Austria	4,859	3,650	75.12%	15.18	1,587	7,166 (1930)	Nationalized with private operators	2022		040
Thailand	4,845	107	2.18%	126.04	16,084		Nationalized with private operators	2025		764
South Korea	4,837	3,787	78.29%	20.76	10,716		Nationalized	2020		410
Uzbekistan	4,669	2,500	53.54%	94.8	6,969	6,950	Nationalized	2020		860
Algeria	4,560	480	10.53%	522.31	9,061	4,815 (1930)	Nationalized	2022		012
Bangladesh	4,458	20	0.45%	33.30	39,178	4,458	Nationalized	2021, 2022		050
Norway	4,240	2,895	68.3%	76.36	1291	4,471 (1950)	Nationalized with private operators	2023		578
New Zealand	4,128	506	12.26%	64.64	1,070	5,681 (1950)	Nationalized	2018		554
DR Congo	4,096	852	20.80%	585.19	16,463			2008		180
Bulgaria	4,029	3,005	74.58%	27.55	1,763	6507	Nationalized	2023		100
Serbia	3,764	1,279	33.98%	23.48	1,866		Nationalized	2017		688
Slovakia	3,626	1,587	43.77%	13.52	1,499		Nationalized	2017		703
Belgium	3,785	3,333	88.05%	8.48	3,140	5,081 (1940)	Nationalized	2025		056
Nigeria	3,600	0	0.00%	261.84	44,904		Nationalized	2006		566
Vietnam	3,315	0	0.00%	141.12	27,765		Nationalized	2023		704
Mozambique	3,249	0	0.00%	256.54	6,604			2008		508
Zimbabwe	3,136	0	0.00%	130.25	4,190		Nationalized	2010		716
Netherlands	3,055	2,314	75.74%	13.59	5,591	3,407 (1920)	Nationalized with private operators Rural lines subject to franchising.	2017		528
Azerbaijan	2,944	1,278	43.41%	41.88	4,666		Nationalized	2015		031
Angola	2,761	0	0.00%	451.54	6,911	2,764	Nationalized	2006		024
Syria	2,750	0	0.00%	86.57	11,078		Nationalized	2010		760
Tanzania	2,600	440	15.40%	348.02	15,866		Nationalized	2006		834
Denmark	2,610	964	36.93%	21.69	2,893	5,290 (1931)	Nationalized, rural lines franchised	2017		208
Croatia	2,604	985	37.83%	21.71	1,595		Nationalized	2017		191
Kenya	2,541	0	0.00%	228.4	17,643		Nationalized	2013		404
Portugal	2,527	1,791	70.87%	36.13	4,049	3,622	Nationalized	2023		620
Ireland	2,400	53	3.15%	41.83	3,065	4,354 (1921 - this included Northern Ireland)	Nationalized	2025		372
Namibia	2,382	0	0.00%	346.05	877		Nationalized	2006		516
Greece	2,240	764	34.11%	58.91	4,808	2,632 (1940)	Semi-Privatized	2017		300
Ethiopia	2,185	1,401	64.12%	1,675.72	150,935		Nationalized	2016		231
Tunisia	2,165	0	0.00%	75.57	5,326	2,173 (1950)	Nationalized	2018		788
Morocco	2,109	1,022	48.46%	211.74	16,946		Nationalized	2017		504
Malaysia	2,041 (Note: This figure includes: Keretapi Tanah Melayu (1,655 km; 776 km electrified), Express Rail Link (57 km electrified), Sabah State Railway (134 km unelectrified) and the MRT and LRT network of Klang Valley (195 km electrified))	1,028	50.37%	162.06	15,383		Nationalized	2021		458
Iraq	2,032	0	0.00%	215.71	15,587	2,029(1985)	Nationalized	2006		368
Peru	2,020	0	0.00%	636.25	14,585	4,205 (1930)	Private	2008		604
Bolivia	1,954	0	0.00%	383.32	3,638	3,692 (1997)	Nationalized	2011		068
Lithuania	1,910	156	8.17%	33.8	1,490	2,147 (1950)	Nationalized	2021		440
Latvia	1,860	257	13.82%	35.11	1,048	2,763 (1920)	Nationalized	2017		428
Mongolia	1,810	0	0.00%	864.15	1,560		Nationalized	2008		496
Uruguay	1,791	0	0.00%	58.88	1,121	2,961	Nationalized	2006		858
Taiwan	1,771	1,630 (Note: Sum of the electrified route length for Taiwan Railway (1004.4 km), the route length of Taiwan High Speed Railway (350 km), and the operational route lengths of rapid transit – excluding the catenary-free Kaohsiung Light Rail – listed in the Annual Transportation Report (276 km total).)	92.0%	20.44	13,156	5,000	Nationalized (Conventional network); Private (High-Speed network)	2025	(Note: Government report for 2025 takes into account Taiwan Railway, Taiwan High Speed Rail, and rapid transit systems. Previous editions have included industrial railways such as the Taiwan Sugar Railways as well.)	158
Colombia	1,663	0	0.00%	648.85	27,770		Private	2007		170
Georgia	1,576	1,288	81.73%	44.23	2,360		Nationalized	2016		268
Sri Lanka	1,561	0	0.00%	43.51	13,696	1,530 (1930–1940)	Nationalized	2024		144
Israel	1,511	700	46.32%	14.61	6,487		Nationalized	2024	excludes urban rail	376
Uganda	1,244	0	0.00%	930.65	122,780		Nationalized	2002		800
Zambia	1,237	0	0.00%	608.42	10,547			2006		894
Slovenia	1,209	503	41.60%	16.75	1,709		Nationalized	2017		705
Estonia	1,161	132	11.37%	38.96	1,134	3,000	Both	2017		233
Moldova	1,151	0	0.00%	29.4	3,084		Nationalized	2017		498
Bosnia and Herzegovina	1,018	565	55.50%	50.29	3,445		Nationalized	2017		070
Cameroon	977	0	0.00%	486.63	23,367	1,104		2015		120
Ecuador	966	0	0.00%	293.54	14,810	1,131 (1930)		2006	Services ceased 2020	218
Ghana	953	0	0.00%	250.30	25,429			2006		288
Senegal	906	55	6.0%	217.12	16,534			2015		686
United Arab Emirates	900	0	0.00%	92.8	12,252	900	Nationalized	2023		784
Botswana	888	0	0.00%	655.1	2,488			2014		072
Madagascar	848	0	0.00%	692.27	28,573			2015		450
Guinea	837	0	0.00%	293.74	11,926			2006		324
Gabon	810	0	0.00%	330.45	1,858			2007		266
Malawi	797	0	0.00%	148.66	18,696			2007		454
Congo	795	0	0.00%	430.19	5086		Nationalized	2006		178
Benin	758	0	0.00%	148.58	11,581			2006		204
Mali	729	0	0.00%	1,701.22	22,606			2013		466
Mauritania	728	0	0.00%	1,415.80	4,753		Nationalized	2008		478
Armenia	703	703	100.00%	42.31	4,168		Nationalized	2016		051
North Macedonia	683	313	45.83%	37.65	3,037		Nationalized	2017		807
Cambodia	650	0	0.00%	278.52	24,994		Nationalized	2018		116
Ivory Coast	639	0	0.00%	504.64	30,889			2007		384
Burkina Faso	622	0	0.00%	440.84	25,291			2006		854
Tajikistan	616	0	0.00%	232.31	11,167		Nationalized	2007		762
Fiji	597	0	0.00%	30.61	1,442			2006		242
Togo	568	0	0.00%	100	10,613			2006		768
El Salvador	562	0	0.00%	37.44	10,221			2007		222
Philippines	532	53	10.01%	560.15	211,800	1,352 (1940)	Nationalized	2021		608
Dominican Republic	517	0	0.00%	94.14	18,141			2006		214
Liberia	490	0	0.00%	227.28	8,151		Private	2006		430
Laos	424	414	97.64%	561.2	17,587		Nationalized (operated by China)	2021		418
Kyrgyzstan	417	0	0.00%	479.38	13,446			2012		417
Panama	355	0	0.00%	212.45	9,594			2006		591
Venezuela	336	0	0.00%	2,714.43	87,458	1020 (1950)		2006		862
Albania	334	0	0.00%	86.07	8,602		Nationalized with private operators	2016		008
Eritrea	306	0	0.00%	384.31	17,170		Nationalized	2006		232
Eswatini	301	0	0.00%	57.69	3,940			2008		748
Singapore	285	284	99.7%	2.56	20,892		State owned infrastructure with passenger operations contracted out	2026	(Note: Includes: MRT (246.6 km), LRT (28.8 km), Changi Airport Skytrain (6.4 km), Sentosa Express (2.1 km), KTM Intercity (Shuttle Tebrau, approximately 1 km in Singapore, unelectrified))	702
Costa Rica	278	0	0.00%	183.81	16,416			2007		188
Luxembourg	275	275	100.00%	9.4	2,148	534 (1920–1940)	Nationalized	2017		442
Hong Kong	268	268	100.00%	5.08	33,165		Nationalized (de facto)	2014		344
Montenegro	250	225	90.00%	55.25	2,490		Nationalized	2017		499
South Sudan	248	0	0.00%	2,598.10	48,864					728
Suriname	166	0	0.00%	986.87	3,163			2001	activity ceased 1980's	740
Niger	143	0	0.00%	8,860.14	171,220		Private			562
Guyana	127	0	0.00%	1,149.57	4,197	166 (1920)		2001 est.	activity ceased around 2007	328
Djibouti	93	81	86.9%	252.17	9,203	80		2016	(Note: 81 km electrified main line of the Addis Ababa–Djibouti Railway plus 12 km unelectrified continuation to port. Main line length may include a few kilometres within Ethiopia between the border station in Dewele and the political border.)	262
Sierra Leone	84	0	0.00%	854.05	69,857	544 (1920)		2001		694
Qatar	82	82	100.00%	141.11	34,091					634
Afghanistan	75	0	0.00%	8,696.40	418,827		Nationalized (operated by neighbouring countries)	2011		004
Honduras	67	0	0.00%	160.36	11,753	785 (1993)		2006		340
Jamaica	65	0	0.00%	40.41	9,948	348 (1950)		2003		388
Saint Kitts and Nevis	58	0	0.00%	5.22	1,040			2006		659
Nepal	57	0	0.00%	2,582.12	514,035	146		2017		524
Paraguay	38	0	0.00%	11,298.67	173,056	376		2006		600
Mauritius	30	30	100.00%	68	42,182	206 (1904–1928)	Nationalized	2024	LRT	480
Puerto Rico	17	17	100.00%	143.65	38,810	370		2006		630
Brunei	13	0	0.00%	443.46	30,692			2001 est.	see next table	096
Macau	13	13	100.00%	9.83	6,200	13 (since 2023)	Nationalized	2023	LRT	446
Liechtenstein	9	9	100.00%	17.78	4,017	9 (since 1872)	Nationalized (operated by Austria)	2024		438
Nauru	3.9	0	0.00%	4.20	2,000			2001		520
Monaco	1.7	1.7	100.00%	1.18	20,588	3.5 (1868–1958)	Nationalized (operated by France)	2024		492
Guatemala	1.6	0	0.00%	123.04	16,228	799.8	Private	2004	Cross-border line from Mexico, otherwise ceased 2007	320
Lesotho	1.6	0	0.00%	10,118.33	723,667			1995		426
Vatican City	0.3	0	0.00%	1.47	3,333	0.3 (since 1934)	Nationalized (operated by Italy)	2024		336
European Union (Note: The European Union (EU) is an economic and political union of 27 member states that are located primarily in Europe. The EU is included as a separate entity because it has many attributes of independent nations, being much more than a free-trade association such as ASEAN, NAFTA, or Mercosur. Transport and trans-European networks are among the shared competencies between the EU and member states. As the EU is not a country, the United States is the first ranked country on these lists.)	202,100	115,220	56.98%	20.33	2,113.37		Both	2024		
World	1,384,091	448,313	32.73%	107.95	372.12	4,814		2021		

== Active network size by region ==
Operational length in km:
1. Asia: 380,583 (30.1%)
2. Europe: 376,924 (29.8%)
3. North America: 302,968.6 (23.9%)
4. Africa: 85,476.6 (6.75%)
5. South America: 82,478 (6.51%)
6. Oceania: 37,652.9 (2.97%)
7. Antarctica: 0 (0.00%)

Region	Continent	Length (km)		% of the total electrified	(per route km)	
Region	Continent	Total	Electrified	% of the total electrified	Area (km^{2})	Population
Africa		85,476.6	4,600	5.38%	355.30	16,304
Asia (Note: includes Caucasus countries and Turkey.)		380,583	233,331.1	61.31%	117.13	12,335
ASEAN	Asia	31,375	2,493	7.95%	144.14	21,778
Europe		376,924	207,070.7	54.94%	27.02	1,977
European Union	Europe	211,430	118,363	55.98%	20.33	2,113
North America		302,968.6	2,959.7	0.98%	815.56	1,955
Oceania		37,652.9	3,954	10.5%	239.02	1,181
South America		82,478	9,915	12.02%	216.30	5,265

== Countries without active network ==
=== Former operators ===
Countries with defunct rail networks
Country	Comment	ISO 3166-1
Antigua and Barbuda	Had agricultural / industrial lines	028
Bahamas	Had a plantation railway	044
Barbados	Had a public railway. Has a 3 km tourist line opened in 2019.	052
Belize	Had one public railway and a number of private lines	084
Brunei	Has a 4 km section of pier railway (so is outside the definition for this article)	096
Burundi	Had an internal port railway	108
Cape Verde	Had a harbour railway	132
Central African Republic	Had a short portage railway	140
Comoros	Had plantation railways	174
Cyprus	Cyprus Government Railway operated 1905 to 1951	196
Dominica	Had a forestry railway	212
Equatorial Guinea	Had a line on Isla de Bioko	226
Gambia	Had minor port / industrial lines	270
Grenada	Had a very minor industrial line	308
Guinea-Bissau		624
Guyana	Had a number of public lines until the 1970s and industrial lines until around 2007	328
Haiti	Rails still in Port-au-Prince from railway from factories to port, left out of service since the 1970s.	332
Iceland	Had short industrial lines, see Rail transport in Iceland for proposals	352
Jordan	Had passenger and freight lines, see Rail transport in Jordan	400
Kiribati	Had industrial lines	296
Lebanon	Had from 1890 until 1970 (future projects to build a railway from Tyre to Tripoli)	422
Libya	1912 to 1965 (peak length of 399 km); (network under construction in 2008–2011, but works stopped, see Libyan Railways)	434
Malta	Had a railway line from 1883 until 1931 (11 km) and a three line tramway network from 1905 until 1929 (circa 14 km)	470
Federated States of Micronesia		583
Nicaragua	Suspended in September 2001	558
Oman	Proposals as part of Gulf Railway. Has a short tourist line at the Al Hoota Cave.	512
Palau	Had an industrial line. Has a short tourist monorail (of small gauge)	585
Papua New Guinea	Had numerous plantation and mining railways, all closed by the early 1990s. Line from Lae to Vanimo proposed (see Transport in Papua New Guinea).	598
Rwanda	Had industrial lines, out of use since the 1990s. Lines to Uganda and/or Tanzania (see Isaka–Kigali Standard Gauge Railway) proposed	646
Saint Lucia		662
Samoa		882
San Marino	A short section (800 metres or 0.5 miles) of the electric railway that linked Rimini (Italy) and San Marino City until 1944 has been restored.	674
São Tomé and Príncipe		678
Solomon Islands	Small railways used to transport bananas and copra, all closed by 1970.	090
Somalia	Mogadishu–Villabruzzi Railway existed from 1914 to 1941	706
Suriname		740
Tonga		776
Trinidad and Tobago	Trinidad Government Railway from 1876 until 1968; Trinidad Rapid Railway was planned but cancelled	780
Vanuatu	Suggested to have had a line on Efate	548
Yemen	Had lines from the mountains to Aden and Al Hudaydah, all closed by 1929	887

Bermuda, a British overseas territory, had a railway operating from 1931 to 1948.
Falkland Islands, a British overseas territory, had a railway operating from 1915 to late 1920's.

=== Never had a network ===
Countries which never had railways
Country	Comment	ISO 3166-1
Andorra	There are proposals to construct a line	020
Bahrain	Proposed as part of Gulf Railway	048
Bhutan	A link to India is proposed	064
Chad	See Rail transport in Chad for proposals	148
Timor-Leste		626
Kuwait	Proposed as part of Gulf Railway	414
Maldives		462
Marshall Islands		584
Saint Vincent and the Grenadines		670
Seychelles		690
Tuvalu		798

== See also ==
- List of countries by rail usage
- Rail transport by country
- List of high-speed railway lines
