= List of ports in Djibouti =

This list of Ports and harbours in Djibouti details the ports, harbours around the coast of Djibouti.

== List of ports and harbours in Djibouti ==
| Port/Harbour name | Regions | City/Town name | Coordinates | UN/Locode | Max. draught (m) | Max. deadweight (t) | Remarks |
|---|---|---|---|---|---|---|---|
| Port of Djibouti | Djibouti City | Djibouti City | 11°36′N 43°06′E | DJJIB | 16 | 156,198 | Medium-sized port on the coast of the Gulf of Tadjoura. |
| Port of Tadjoura | Tadjourah Region | Tadjoura | 11°46′N 43°06′E | DJTDJ | 12 | 65,000 | The port is located on the northern coast of the Gulf of Tadjoura. |
| Port of Doraleh | Djibouti City | Djibouti City | 11°36′N 42°58′E | DJDCT | 15.3 | 100,000 | The multipurpose port is located in the western part of Djibouti City. |
| Port of Ghoubet | Arta Region | Ghoubet | | | 15 | 100,000 | The port is located 45 km south of the Ghoubbet-el-Kharab. |
