= Ghiran =

- Town
- Location in Libya
- Coordinates: 32°21′00″N 15°02′00″E
- Country: Libya
- Region: Tripolitania
- District: Misrata
- Time zone: UTC+2 (EET)

Ghiran is a coastal town in Libya.

== Transport ==
Ghiran lies near the proposed Libyan Railways line.

The earthworks for the new lines under construction can be seen on the aerial photographs.

There is also an airport nearby.

== See also ==
- Transport in Libya
