= Rail transport in Djibouti =

Rail transport in Djibouti is administered through the Ethio-Djibouti Standard Gauge Rail Transport Share Company, a bi-national company between Ethiopia and Djibouti to manage the only railway in Djibouti, the electrified standard gauge international Addis Ababa–Djibouti Railway. This railway opened on 1 January 2018 and replaced the international metre gauge railway from Djibouti's capital Djibouti City to the Ethiopian capital Addis Ababa, which was officially decommissioned in 2016.

== Addis Ababa–Djibouti Railway ==
Ethiopia and Djibouti's economies are reliant on each other with about 95 percent of all Ethiopian international trade going through Djibouti's port at the Port of Doraleh. The old metre gauge railway was almost defunct and unable to transport goods to and from Ethiopia to Djibouti for decades. In 2010, Ethiopia decided to build a new standard gauge railway. In 2011, one year after finalizing plans on a new national railway network, financing was secured for the Addis Ababa–Djibouti Railway and construction was awarded to Chinese construction firms. In October 2016 and January 2017, the railway was completed and inaugurated. The railway became operational on 1 January 2018. The physical railway of 759 km length alone did cost around US $3.5b (US $4m per km of railway) while the Exim Bank of China facilitated a package, that resulted in loans of about US $2.5b in total. Therefore, In 2013, loans totalling US$3 billion were secured from the Exim Bank of China, with US$2.4 billion going to the Ethiopian section of the railway and the balance to be spent in Djibouti. As the loans came from China, most contributing firms were from China.

A total of 93 km of the railway is running on Djiboutian territory. It is a single track railway line along the entire Djiboutian share of the railway. It connects the border with Ethiopia at Guelile with the Port of Doraleh in the capital Djibouti City. The border crossing with Ethiopia at Guelile has no railway station, the first railway station on Djiboutian territory is at Ali Sabieh, 9 km inland. 81 km of the railway between the border post at Guelile and the Nagad railway station in the capital Djibouti City close to the Djibouti–Ambouli International Airport are electrified, standard operation happens with trains hauled by electric locomotives. The final stretch between the Nagad railway station and the Port of Doraleh (12.1 km) is non-electrified and only served by diesel locomotives to avoid interferences of loading / unloading cranes with the electric overhead catenary of an electrified railway.

Along the line, Djibouti has a total of four railway stations:

- Ali Sabieh passenger & freight railway station, a single 300 m long boarding platform and a station building for passenger handling (ticketing, refreshments).
- Holhol passenger & freight railway station, a single 200 m long boarding platform and a station building for passenger handling (ticketing, refreshments).
- Nagad passenger & freight railway station, a single 300 m long boarding platform and a station building for passenger handling (ticketing, refreshments).
- Djibouti Port station, freight yard without passenger services in the non-electrified railway section, for collecting and assembling freight trains.

All trains stations have at least three tracks and could serve as passing loops on the single-track railway line. in addition, depots and maintenance facilities are located at the stations. The traction power for the overhead catenaries is delivered through three substations which are directly connected to the Ethiopian national grid.

As of January 2018, there is no domestic passenger traffic between Ali Sabieh, Holhol and Djibouti City, all trains are international trains from and to Ethiopia serving the Nagad and the Port train stations only.

== Proposed railways ==
- There is another major electrified standard gauge railway line proposed between Ethiopia and Djibouti, the Weldiya–Tadjoura Railway. That railway line was not expected to connect to the Addis Ababa–Djibouti Railway. The Weldiya–Tadjoura Railway was considered to connect Ethiopia through the border station at Galafi with the new Port of Tadjourah, the second-largest Djiboutian port for bulk goods (potash). This railway was postponed during the tendering process. Private potash-mining companies in Ethiopia are planning a privately financed and built freight railway instead, if the potash mining produces transportation volumes above 2 million tonnes annually. Such a privately financed railway would also be running from the border post at Galafi to the Port of Tadjourah. The Djiboutian section would be around 180 km long. The railway might be extended to the proposed Bridge of the Horns and Yemen later.
- An extension of the port section of the Addis Ababa–Djibouti Railway. This branch line would depart from Nagad train station then passing Camp Lemonnier and going to the border with Somaliland at the coast close to the villages of Damerjog / Loyada. Primary reason is another major Djiboutian port to be constructed at Damerjog. This branch line would be 15–20 km long. A later extension to Somaliland (Hargeisa, Berbera) might be possible.

== See also ==
- Railway stations in Djibouti
- Bridge of the Horns (Across the Red Sea)
