= Furi-Labu railway station =

Railway station in Ethiopia

Furi-Labu railway station ፉሪ-ለቡ ባቡር ጣቢያ
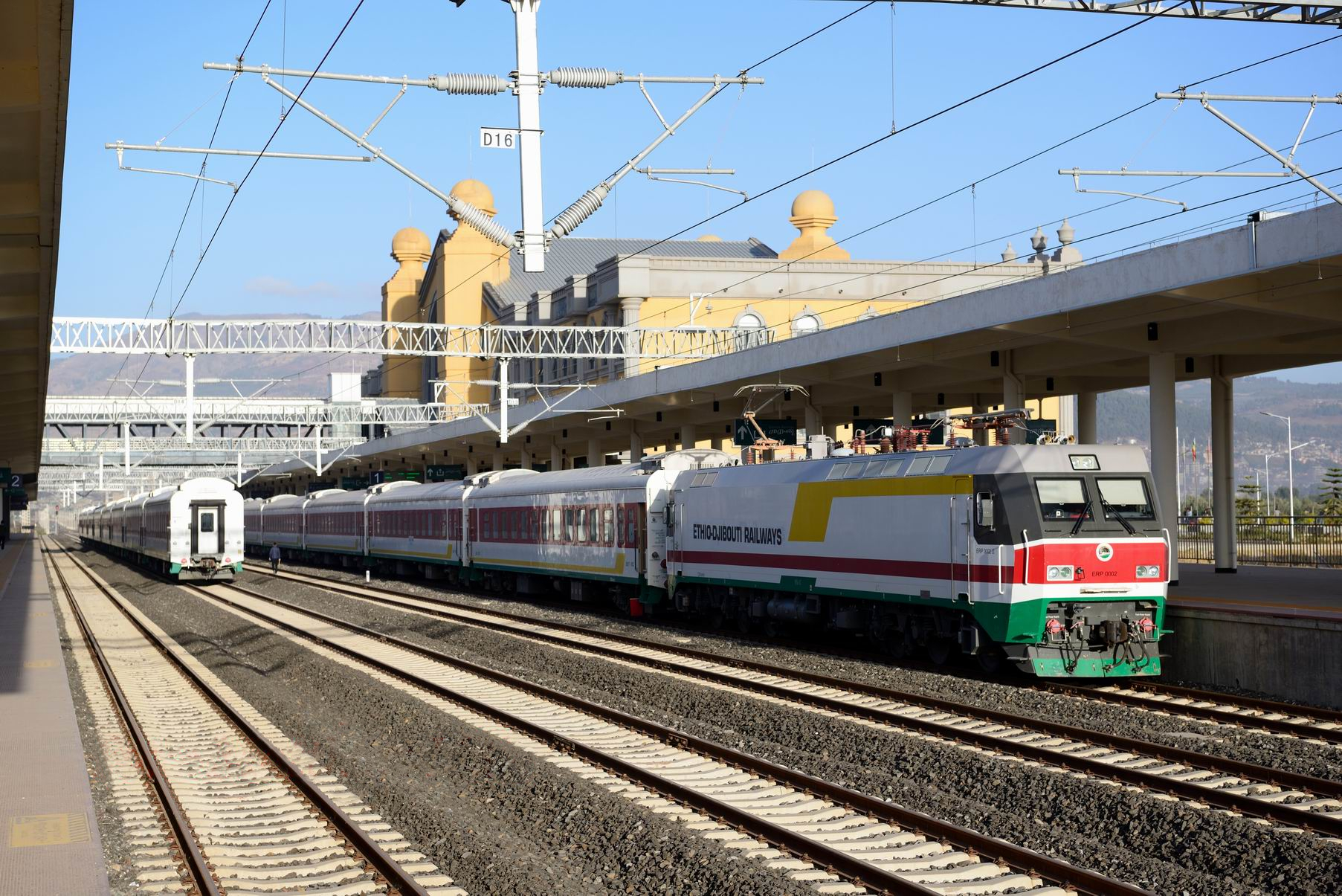
- Platform of the station

General information
- Location: Sebeta Hawas; Ethiopia
- Coordinates: 8°55′55″N 38°41′14″E
- Line: Addis Ababa–Djibouti Railway
- Platforms: 2 side platforms
- Tracks: 4

History
- Opened: 1 January 2018
Location

Furi-Labu railway station (or Furi-Lebu) (Amharic: ፉሪ-ለቡ ባቡር ጣቢያ) is a railway station on the outskirts of Addis Ababa, the capital of Ethiopia. As the terminus of Addis Ababa–Djibouti Railway which connects Ethiopia and Nagad station in Djibouti City, the station was opened along with the railway on 1 January 2018. It is built in traditional Ethiopian style, with yellow as the main color.
