= China Merchants Holdings =

China Merchants Holdings may refer to the following public companies:

- China Merchants Holdings (International) a subsidiary of China Merchants Group
  - China Merchants Holdings (Pacific) a subsidiary of CMHI listed in Singapore Exchange
- China Merchants Fiancee Holdings, a wholly subsidiary of China Merchants Group
- China Merchants Industry Holdings, a wholly subsidiary of China Merchants Group
