= China Merchants Shekou Industrial Zone Holdings =

- Type: State-owned
- Traded as: SZSE: 001979
- Industry: Real estate
- Headquarters: Shenzhen, China
- Key people: Yong Jun Xu (CEO)
- Revenue: $12.1 billion (2018)
- Number of employees: 24,791 (2018)
- Parent: China Merchants Group

China Merchants Shekou Industrial Zone Holdings Co., Ltd (SZSE: 001979; CMSK; Chinese: 招商局蛇口工业区控股股份有限公司 or 招商蛇口) is a Chinese public company based in Shenzhen. The company itself is a subsidiary of China Merchants Group. It was founded in 1978.

The company privatized China Merchants Property, a blue chip of Shenzhen Stock Exchange, in turn floated itself to the same exchange. Shekou Industrial Zone Holdings also owned Shenzhen Nanyou Holdings.

== Core Operations ==
The firm operates three primary sectors:

- Property Development: Built 146 mixed-use complexes, including the 1.8 km^{@} Sea World Cultural Arts Center in Shekou.
- Industrial Parks: Manages 38 innovation hubs like the 4.5 km^{2} Qianhai Shenzhen-Hong Kong Modern Service Zone, hosting 9,500 tech firms.
- Cruise Economy: Operates Wusongkou International Cruise Terminal (Shanghai), handling 1.2 million passengers annually pre-pandemic.
