= China Merchants Property =

Real estate company

China Merchants Property Development Company Limited 招商局地產控股股份有限公司
- Type: Subsidiary (former public company)
- Traded as: SZSE: 000024 (A share); SZSE: 200024 (B share); SGX: C03 (S chip)
- Industry: Real estate
- Founded: 1984
- Headquarters: Shenzhen, Guangdong, China
- Area served: People's Republic of China
- Key people: Chairman: Mr. Lin Shaobin
- Parent: Shekou Industrial Zone Holdings
- Website: China Merchants Property Development Company Limited

China Merchants Property Development Co., Ltd. was established in Shenzhen, China in 1984 and it is the real estate flagship of China Merchants. It offers residential properties in Chinese cities, including Shenzhen, Zhuhai, Zhangzhou, Foshan, Guangzhou, Shanghai, Suzhou, Nanjing, Beijing, Tianjin and Chongqing.

In 2015 it was privatized. However, its direct parent company became a listed company instead.

== See also ==
- Real estate in China
- Australian Villa
