= Railway stations in Djibouti =

Railway stations in Djibouti are served by standard gauge railways of the Djiboutian Railway Company.

== Metre gauge railway ==
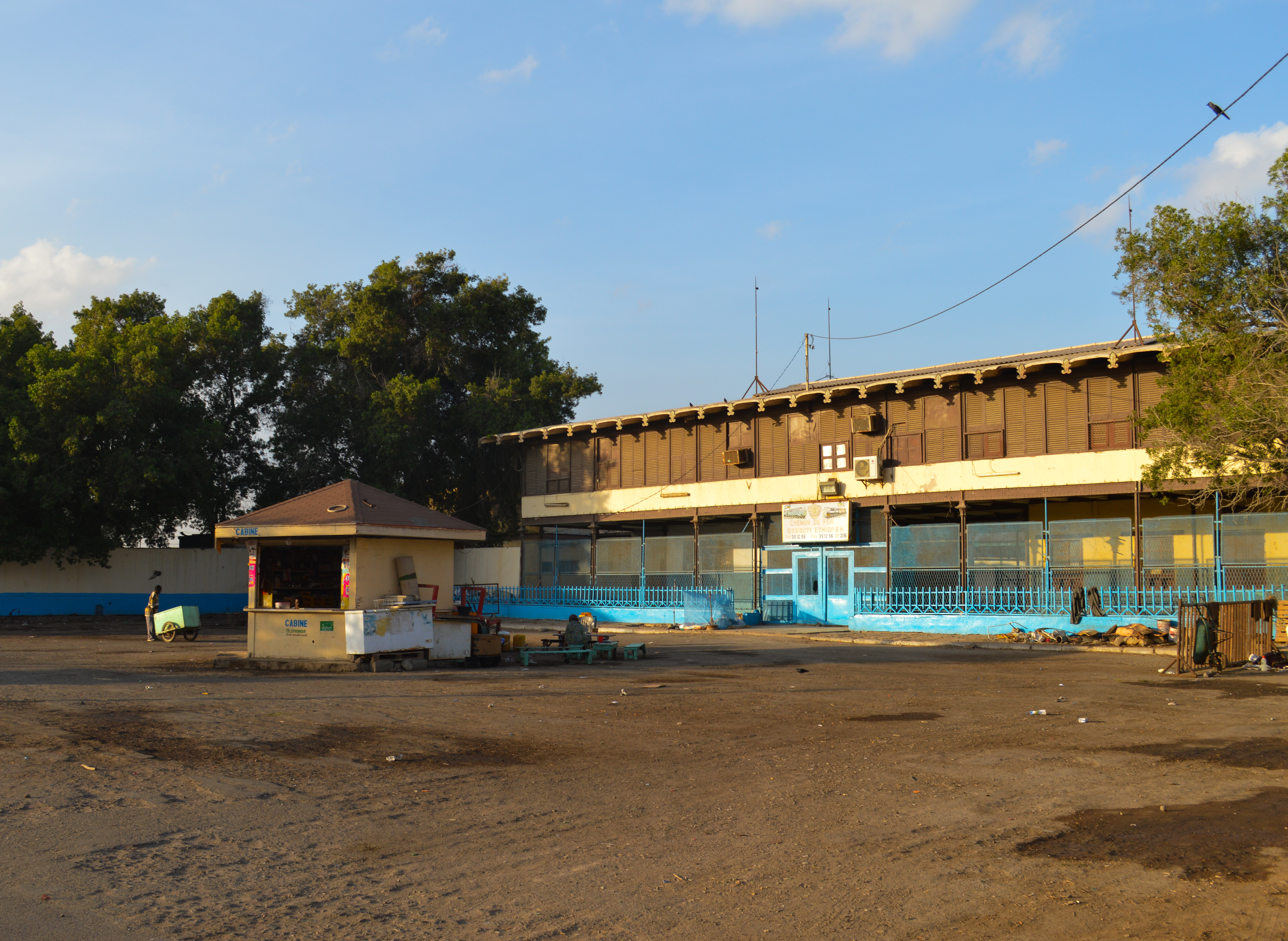
The old Ethio-Djibouti Railways station in Djibouti City

The metre gauge Ethio-Djibouti Railway once connected Addis Ababa to the port city of Djibouti. The operating company that was known as the Ethio-Djibouti Railways built the railway between 1894 and 1917 to connect the Ethiopian capital city to French Somaliland. During early operations, it provided landlocked Ethiopia with its only access to the sea. After World War II, the railway progressively fell into a state of disrepair due to competition from road transport.

The railway has been mostly superseded by the Addis Ababa–Djibouti Railway, an electrified standard gauge railway that was completed in 2017. The metre gauge railway has been abandoned in central Ethiopia and Djibouti. However, a rehabilitated section is still in operation near the Ethiopia-Djibouti border. As of February 2018, a combined passenger and freight service runs two times a week between the Ethiopian city of Dire Dawa and the Djibouti border, stopping at Dewele (passengers) and Guelile (freight). Plans were announced in 2018 to rehabilitate track from Dire Dawa to Mieso.

=== List of railway stations ===
==== Passenger railway stations ====
The stations below are passenger railway stations on operational railways.

Standard gauge passenger railway stations in Djibouti
Station	Distance	Altitude	Remarks
Djibouti City - Port of Doraleh	0 km (0.0 mi)	4 m (13 ft)	Mainly freight
Djibouti City - Nagad	12 km (7.5 mi)	30 m (98 ft)	Djibouti City Main Station
Holhol	44 km (27.3 mi)	407 m (1,335 ft)	
Ali Sabieh	77 km (47.8 mi)	692 m (2,270 ft)	

=== Other stations ===
List of other metre gauge passenger railway stations in Djibouti
Station	built	Status
Djibouti City	Ethio-Djibouti Railway	abandoned
Chébélé	Ethio-Djibouti Railway	abandoned
Goubetto	Ethio-Djibouti Railway	abandoned
Holhol	Ethio-Djibouti Railway	abandoned
Dasbiou	Ethio-Djibouti Railway	abandoned
Ali Sabieh	Ethio-Djibouti Railway	abandoned

== Gauge ==
- Existing lines are 1,000 mm (3 ft 3 3/8 in) gauge.
- Proposed lines are to be 1,435 mm (4 ft 8 1/2 in) gauge.

== Proposed lines ==
A new line from Ethiopia will serve the port of Tadjourah which lies on the opposite (northern) shore of the Gulf of Tadjourah.

In 2013, CCECC of China is to build a new line from a container harbour at the Port of Doraleh to the Ethiopian border (near Ali Sabieh), on the way to Ethiopia. The new line junctions at Dewale.

== See also ==
- Transport in Djibouti
- Railway stations in Ethiopia
- Lamu Port and Lamu-Southern Sudan-Ethiopia Transport Corridor
