= Nagad railway station =

Railway station in Djibouti

Nagad Railway Station
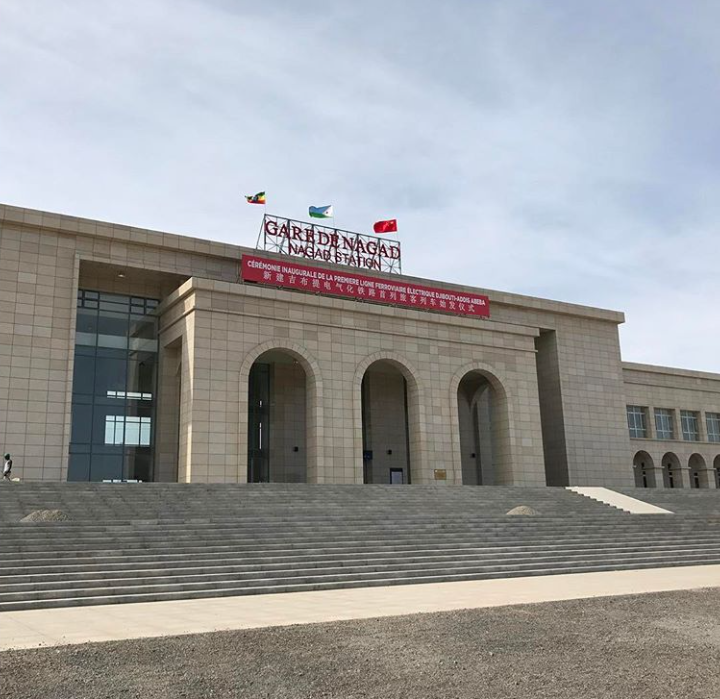
- Nagad Railway Station

General information
- Location: Nagad, Djibouti City; Djibouti
- Coordinates: 11°31′24″N 43°07′39″E
- Owner: Société Djiboutienne De Chemin De Fer
- Operator: Société Djiboutienne De Chemin De Fer

History
- Opened: 10 January 2017
Location

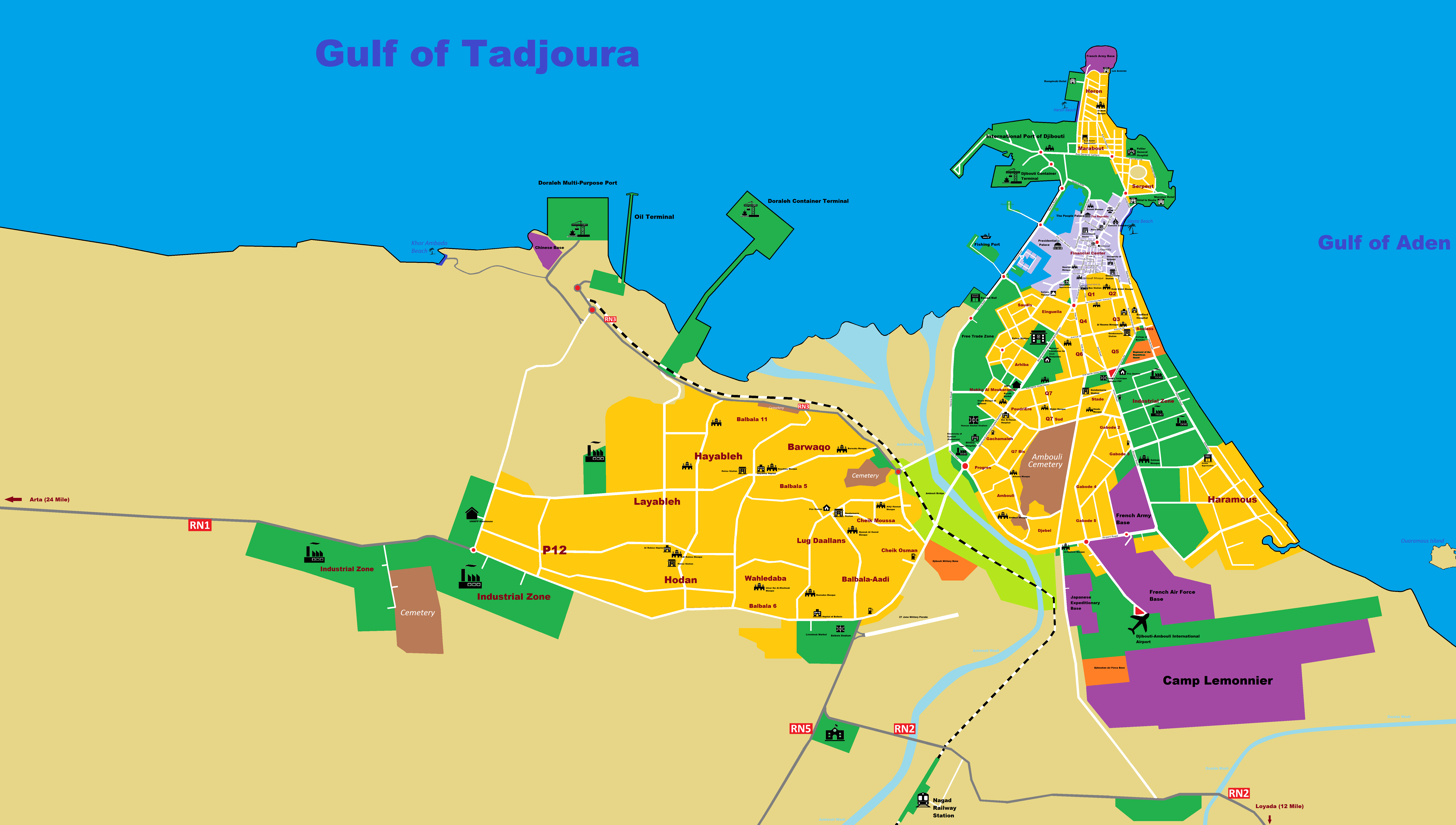
Djibouti City with Nagad Railway Station located near the bottom of the map.

Nagad Railway Station is the new and only passenger rail station of Djibouti City, the capital of Djibouti.

== Overview ==
Located in the south of the city near Djibouti–Ambouli International Airport, it serves as the terminus for passenger rail services on the new Addis Ababa–Djibouti Railway, which runs southwards from Nagad Railway Station towards the Ethiopian capital Addis Ababa.

The new passenger rail station replaces the old and now decommissioned Djibouti City Railway Station, which served as the terminus of the now-abandoned metre-gauge Ethio-Djibouti Railway.

== Transport ==
Nagad Railway Station also handles freight trains. It is the main freight station of Djibouti, with the Port of Doraleh of Djibouti City being the only other. Only freight trains continue northwards from Nagad Railway Station to the Port of Doraleh - on diesel power, the electrified section of the standard-gauge railway terminates at Nagad Railway Station.

The railroad and the railway station is operated by Société Djiboutienne De Chemin De Fer (Djiboutian Railway Company), the national railway operator. On 10. January 2017, both the railway station and the 100 km (62 mi) section of the railway on Djibouti territory were inaugurated in a ceremony held in the new station by Djibouti's President Ismail Omar Guelleh and Ethiopia's prime minister Hailemariam Dessalegn.

It was originally expected that passenger services from Nagad Railway Station start three months after the official inauguration in January 2017, but passenger trains running on schedule haven't been observed ever since (as of end of June 2017). The station is in frequent use by freight trains, though.

== See also ==
- Railway stations in Djibouti
