= Port of Djibouti =

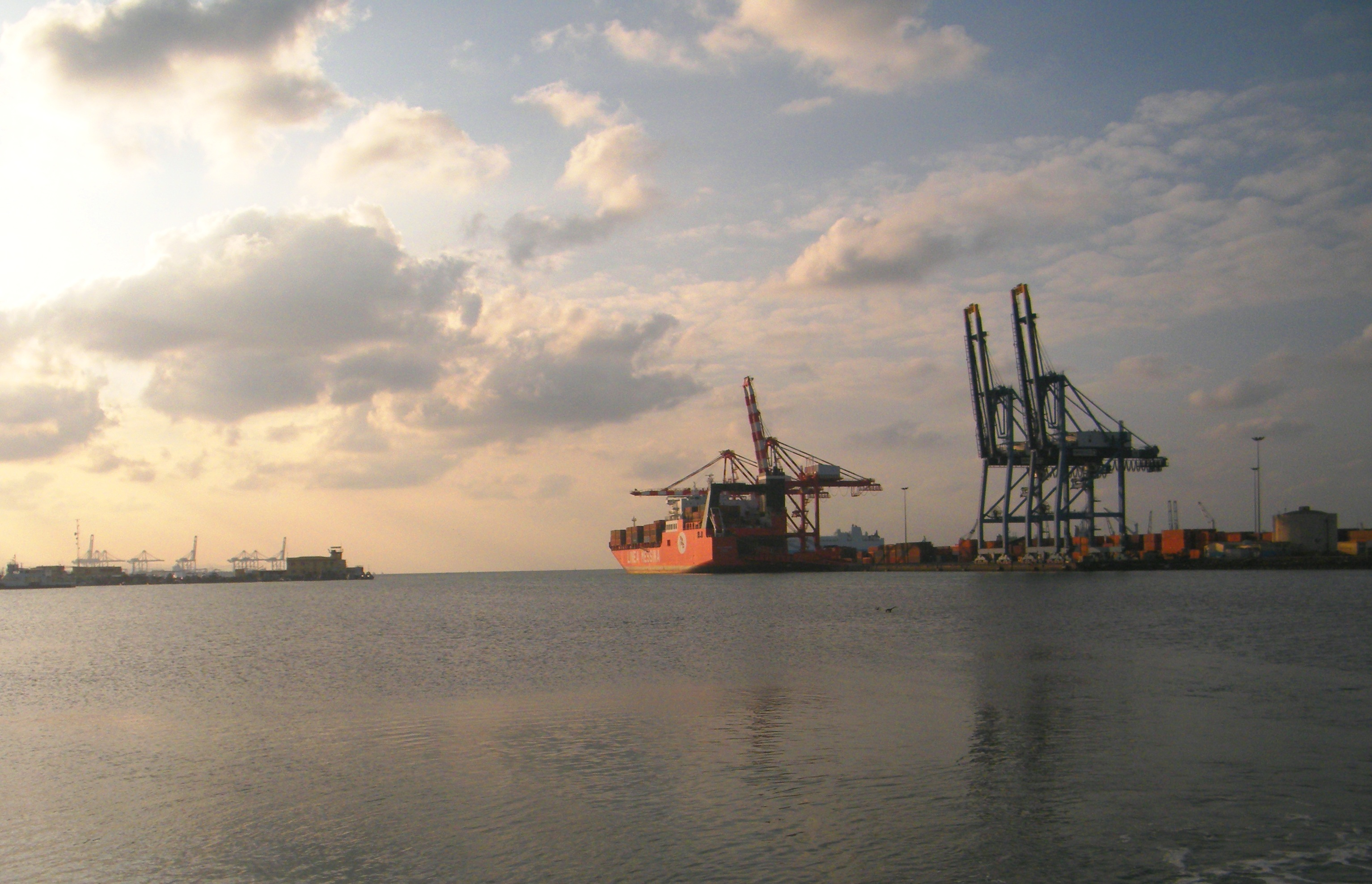
- The container terminal at the Port of Djibouti.
- Interactive map of Port of Djibouti

Location
- Country: Djibouti
- Location: Djibouti
- Coordinates: 11.6053°N 43.1392°E
- UN/LOCODE: DJPOD

Details
- Operated by: Djibouti Ports & Free Zones Authority

Statistics
- Website www.portdedjibouti.com

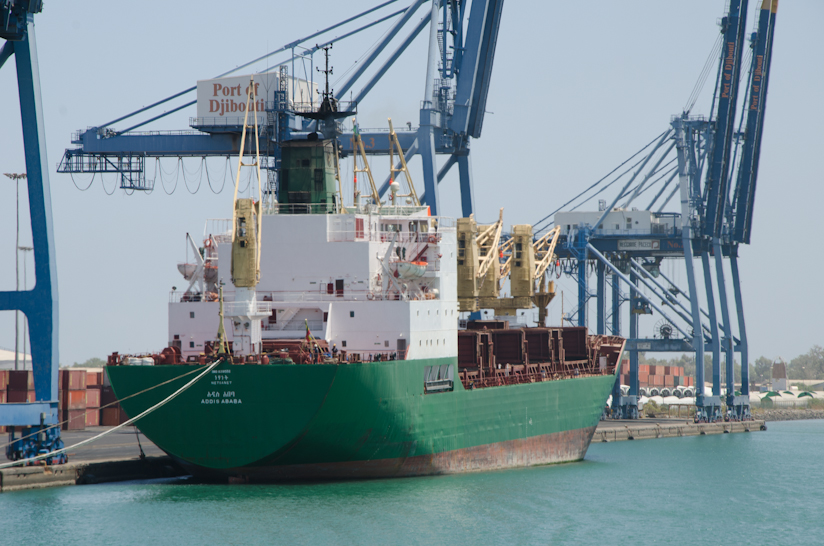
An Ethiopian cargo ship docked at the Port of Djibouti.

The Port of Djibouti is a port in Djibouti, the capital of Djibouti. It is strategically located at the crossroads of one of the busiest shipping routes in the world, linking Europe, the Far East, the Horn of Africa and the Persian Gulf. The port serves as a key refueling and transshipment and also transport means center, and is the principal maritime outlet for imports to and exports from neighboring Ethiopia. An estimated 2,500 ships pass through and call through the port annually.

The economy of Djibouti relies heavily on the strategic location of its port since about a third of all daily shipping in the world passes the north-east edge of Africa. The port has been at the center of a legal dispute between port operator DP World and the government of Djibouti since 2018, when DP World's port concession was revoked by presidential decree.

== Operations ==
The Djibouti Ports & Free Zones Authority (DPFZA) is the governmental body administering the Port of Djibouti and other ports in the country. The organization also oversees the national free zones, serving as a liaison between the companies working therein and other government agencies. The DPFZA is subject to the Presidential Office and currently chaired by Aboubaker Omar Hadi.

=== Ethiopian trade ===
Seventy percent of the cargo at the port is shipped to or from Ethiopia, accounting for over 95% of landlocked Ethiopia's foreign trade. The port lost its direct railway access to Ethiopia when the Ethio-Djibouti Railway was abandoned. The Addis Ababa–Djibouti Railway, opened in 2018, runs to the nearby Port of Doraleh. However, because Ethiopia insisted it be electrified, it has been experiencing power problems and has thus remained behind delivery expectations, with most cargo reaching the port of Ethiopia via road.

=== Foreign navies ===
The port's strategic location on the Gulf of Aden makes it an important military outpost for five military bases of the Great Powers, earning it $125 million a year in rents from the US, China, France, Japan and Italy combined.

The United States Navy is present at the port, having made Camp Lemonnier its only African base in an effort to fight the Global War on Terror. It uses the port to counter the terrorism threat posed by al-Shabaab, an al-Qaeda-linked Somali terrorist group, and to fight piracy in the region.

The French Navy has 5,000 troops in Djibouti, making the port France's largest overseas base. Germany and Spain are also hosted by the French while Italy has its own base in the country. Japan's only foreign military base is also based in Djibouti and is now set to be expanded as a counterweight to China's increasing influence.

China opened its naval support base near the Doraleh port in Djibouti in 2017, its first overseas military base.

== History ==
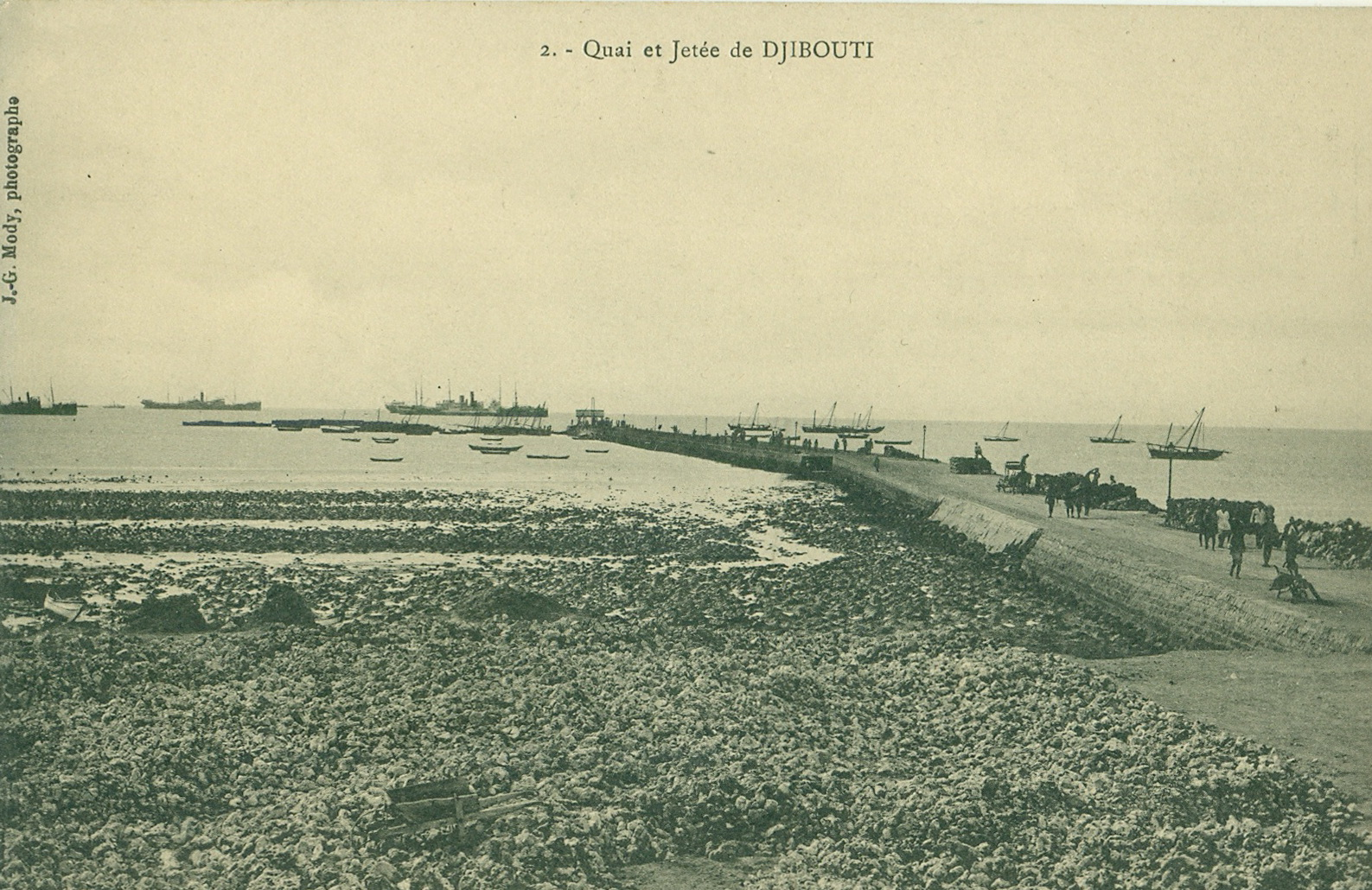
French Postcard from beginning of 20th century: Jetty of the Port of Djibouti.

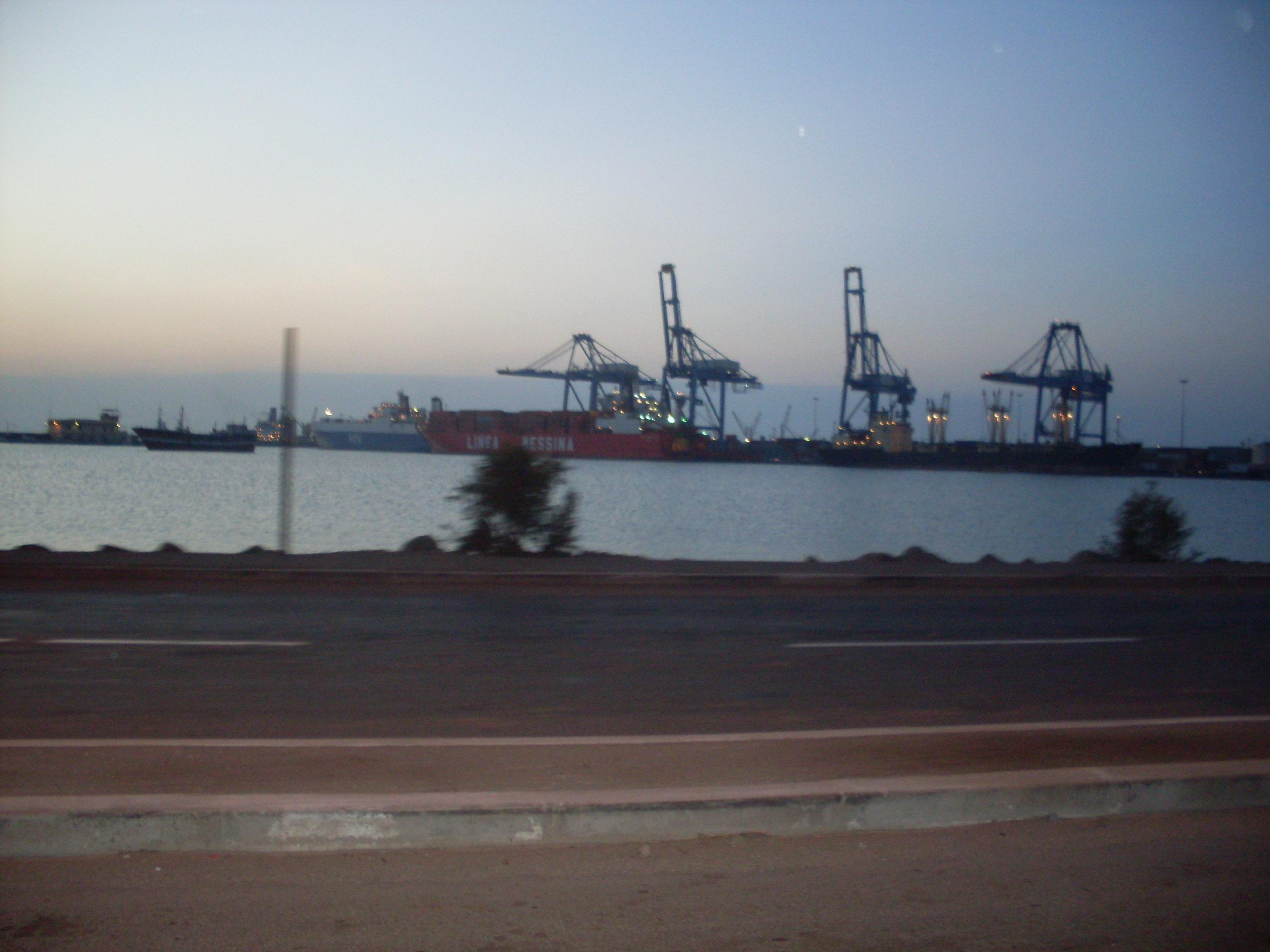
Commercial vessels at the Port of Djibouti.

Djibouti as a main maritime passage and a main trading route between East and West stretches back 3,500 years, the time of maritime explorations of the Red Sea. A strategic meeting point between Northeast Africa and the Arabian Peninsula, the Red Sea was a place of contact and passage used by the Egyptians, the Phoenicians, the Ptolemaists, the Romans, the Greeks, the Byzantines, the Arabs, and then by the Europeans in search of the Spice route. Its apogee came with the opening of the Suez Canal.

The port evolved out of landlocked Ethiopia's search for a maritime outlet, and Djibouti's coastline provided both easy access and sheltered anchorage. Work on the Franco-Ethiopian Ethio-Djibouti Railways began in 1897 and completed in 1917, connecting the Ethiopian capital of Addis Ababa to the port of Djibouti. The completion of the railway greatly increased business at the port.

Development at the port increased further between 1948 and 1957 with the construction of four deep-water quays and the dredging of the port access channels. On land, new warehouses and oil storage facilities were built, electricity and water supplies provided and railway lines laid.

In 1952, the French oil company Pétroles de Somalie (now known as Total S.A.) bunkered its first ship, and in 1956, Mobil Oil set up in Djibouti.

Between 1960 and 1970, port activity was developed as part of an international maritime exchange network. The Red Sea had become one of the busiest shipping lanes in the world, and Djibouti found itself acting as its service station. Bunkering traffic quadrupled in the ten years from 1954, reaching a peak of 1.8 million tons in 1965.

Djibouti's strategic location enabled the port authorities to turn the port into a regional hub for the Red Sea and Indian Ocean, as well as for Europe, Africa and Asia. Containerization was the defining concept behind this new period of development and Djibouti's first modern container terminal began operations in February 1985.

From 1991 to 1994, Djibouti experienced a civil war which crippled the country's economy. By the early 2000s, the Ethiopia-Djibouti Railways had deteriorated from a lack of maintenance.

== Recent developments ==
Through its Belt and Road Initiative, China has become an important trading and military partner for Djibouti. Between 2011 and 2016, the Chinese built a high-capacity standard gauge railway to replace the colonial-era French railway. The Addis Ababa–Djibouti Railway terminates at the nearby Port of Doraleh and restores Ethiopia's railroad access to the sea. It is the first modern electrified railway line in East Africa.

In September 2013, construction began on the Damerjog port, financed by China Merchants Group and the government of Djibouti and constructed by China Civil Engineering Construction Corporation (CCECC). The terminal is now used for livestock, a shipping line, a repair yard for vessels, and a liquid bulk port.

That same year, work on the Doraleh multipurpose port was initiated. The Port of Doraleh now relieves congestion at the original Port of Djibouti, adding 29 million tons of annual capacity.

In January 2021, the World Bank and IHS Markit's Global Container Port Performance Index ranked Djibouti's port as the best container port in Africa and 61st globally. According to the report, "ships spend a median time of less than one day in Djibouti's port, making it among the most efficient in the world". This has raised hopes in the port management that Djibouti's port could "become the next Singapore".

In May 2021, Kenya began construction works of Lamu Port designed to create a transport corridor between the Lamu archipelago, South Sudan and Ethiopia. The port is being built by China Communications Construction Company. As the port will mainly serve as a transshipment hub, it's expected to attract key shipping lines and could begin to compete with the port of Djibouti.

=== Controversies ===
Chinese influence in Djibouti, particularly through its military base, has been criticized in recent years as being more beneficial to the stability of the current political regime than for the country itself. With Chinese investment totaling $853 million between 2005 and 2019 and financial debt owed to China equaling 30% of Djibouti's total debt, China has become an increasingly important trading and military partner for the African nation. Political commentators have stated that this dependence is not only worrying for the nation's finances, but also that China's growing military presence in the country is a threat to the stability of the geostrategic region.

In 2012, Djibouti's foreign investment climate was called into question when the government of Djibouti sold the Doraleh Container Terminal concession, at the time run by Dubai-based DP World, to a Chinese competitor, China Merchants Ports Holdings. In February 2018, DP World's concession was revoked by presidential decree and DP World's assets transferred to the Chinese state-run company in the wake of a new law that allows "for the renegotiation and termination of concluded contracts related to the 'management or operation of strategic infrastructure'".

In 2020, the London Court of International Arbitration ruled in favor of DP World, stating that Djibouti's expropriation of the Doraleh Container Terminal was illegal and that the original concession rights are to be restored. The Court had previously ordered the country to pay $533 million in compensation to the DP World. In total, six rulings have been made over the years in DP World's favor, all of which have been ignored by the Djiboutian government, according to the company. After rejecting the ruling in January 2020, Djibouti handed a quarter of the port's stake to China Merchants Ports Holdings.

In July 2021, a seventh decision in DP World's favor came about when the Tribunal ruled that PDSA, a company that managed the terminal with DP World in a joint venture until 2018, had breached the joint venture agreement by unilaterally breaking it and transferring its shares to the Djibouti government that year. The Tribunal ruled that the agreement is still in effect and ordered PDSA to cover DP's legal costs of £1.7 million.

[A1]https://allafrica.com/stories/202107120668.html

=== Coronavirus ===
In June 2020, the Djibouti Ports and Free Zones Authority organized the first crew-change of seafarers stranded at the port as a result of the global coronavirus pandemic, as a result of which 18 Ukrainians and one Russian seaman were able to be relieved and return home.

== See also ==
- Railway stations in Djibouti

== Bibliography ==
- "Port de Djibouti". Port de Djibouti.
