= China Merchants Group =

Chinese state-owned corporation

China Merchants Group Limited

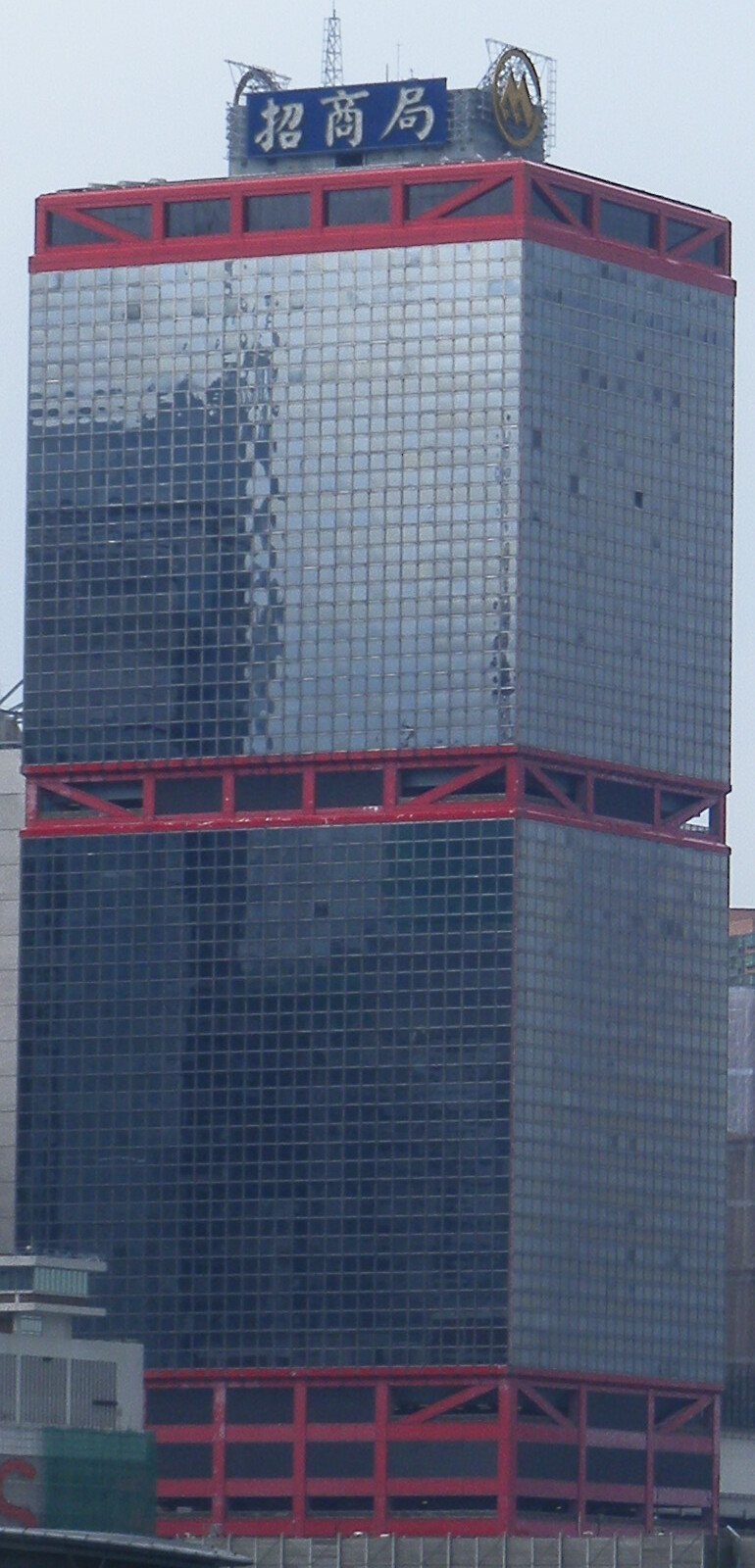
- Headquarters at Shun Tak Centre
- Formerly: China Merchants Steam Navigation Company
- Type: State-owned enterprise
- Industry: Shipping
- Founded: 16 December 1872; 153 years ago in Shanghai
- Founder: Li Hongzhang
- Headquarters: Originally in Shanghai. Now headquartered at Hong Kong
- Website: www.cmhk.com/en/

China Merchants Group
- Simplified Chinese: 招商局集团
- Traditional Chinese: 招商局集團
Transcriptions
Standard Mandarin
- Hanyu Pinyin: Zhāoshāng Jú Jítuán
- Wade–Giles: Chao1-shang1 Chü2 Chi2-t'uan2
Yue: Cantonese
- Jyutping: ziu1 soeng1 guk6 zaap6 tyun4

China Merchants Group Limited (Chinese: 招商局集团; pinyin: Zhāoshāngjú Jítuán) is a state-owned enterprise (SOE) of the People's Republic of China, operating under the auspices of the Government of China.

Founded in 1872 as the China Merchants Steam Navigation Company in Shanghai, the firm has developed into one of China's leading SOEs since the 1980s and has expanded its global role as a result of China's Belt and Road Initiative in the early 2010s. Its principal business segments span ports and logistics, finance, real estate, and marine equipment manufacturing; the latter is conducted through its wholly-owned subsidiary China Merchants Shipbuilding Industry Group (CMI), one of China's leading state-owned shipbuilding conglomerates.

The group has drawn Western media criticism related to the Belt and Road Initiative at Hambantota Port in Sri Lanka and disputes with DP World over the Port of Djibouti.

== Beginnings and growth (1872–1978) ==
=== Early history ===
China Merchants Steam Navigation Company was a shipping company founded on 16 December 1872 by the then Viceroy of Zhili Li Hongzhang, who was also concurrently serving as Commissioner of the Beiyang Fleet. Its purpose was to capture part of the international trade, which had been virtually monopolized by foreign companies based in Treaty ports. 80% of the company's start-up capital was provided by native Chinese, making this the first transportation company using modern technology not based on foreign ownership. It obtained government support and received a monopoly contract to transport the tribute grain from the Yangzi Valley to the capital city of Beijing. The company also received loans from government sources and monopoly rights that prevented the founding of rival Chinese steamship companies.

Initially, Li Hongzhang appointed Zhu Qiang (Chinese: 朱其昂) as manager at the Shanghai office, assisted by his younger brother Zhu Qizhao (Chinese: 朱其詔). The Zhu brothers and extended family had a large and successful sea-going junk business, shipping sand, rice and other cargoes along the regional coast. Zhu Qiang had already purchased an official rank as a sub-Prefect in Zhejiang.

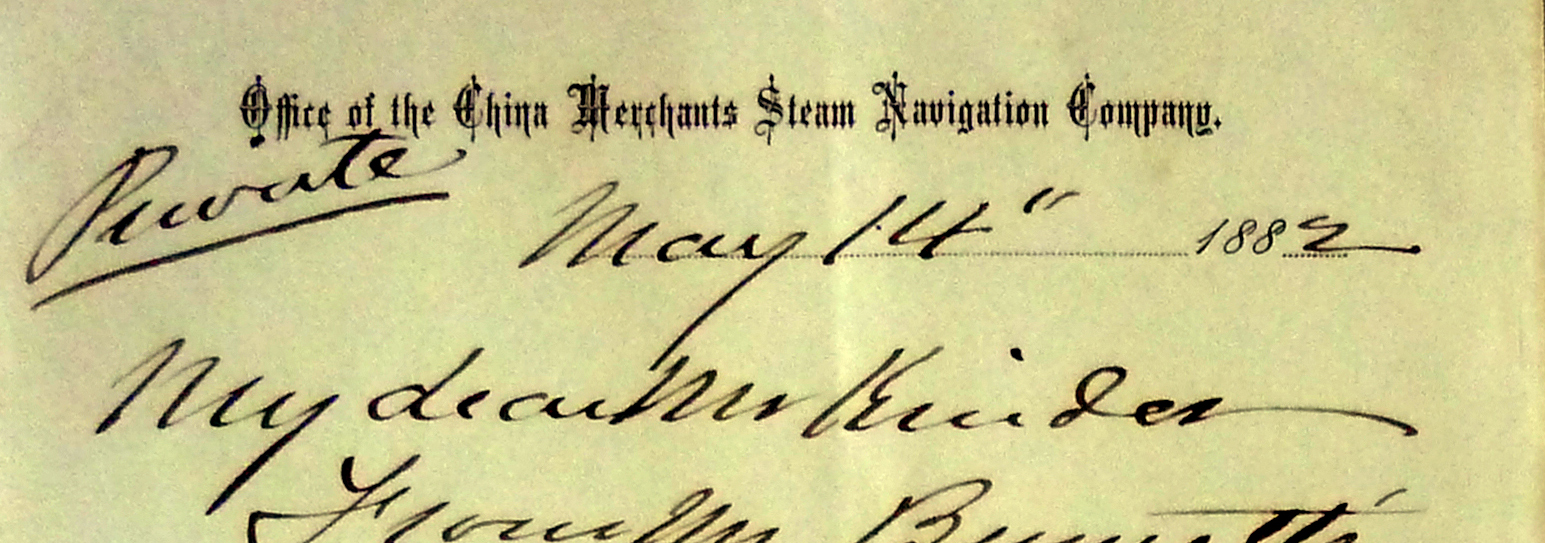
Letterhead for C.M.S.N.Co. 19th Century

The listed Chinese name for this company in the early 1870s was Zhao Shang Gongsi Ju (Chinese: 召商公司局; lit. 'Merchants Bureau'), although by the 1880s it had turned into Lunchuan Zhaoshang Zongju (Chinese: 輪船招商總局; lit. 'China Merchants Shipbuilding Bureau').

In 1872, the company acquired its first steamship, an old combined sail & steam-powered vessel named SS Aden. The ship was previously owned and operated by the Peninsular and Oriental Steam Navigation Company (P & O). However, the Zhu brothers lacked knowledge about modern steamships and their operations, and that they were unsuitable to head the new endeavour. They subsequently replaced Zhu Qiang as manager with the appointment of Tang Jingxing to this position in 1873. Both Zhu brothers, however, being substantial shareholders, retained positions in the company as "Rice Tribute" managers.

By 1877, the company was still not turning a profit and a decision was taken to expand the fleet significantly in an attempt to break the foreign shipping companies' virtual monopoly on the China coastal trading routes. The company purchased the entire fleet of 17 vessels from the Shanghai Steam Navigation Company whose agents were the old-established American Treaty-port traders, Russell & Company.

In 1885, Sheng Xuanhuai was named the company's director-general General to improve its fortunes, following the departure of Tang Jingxing for other industrial projects.

During the Sino-French War of 1884-85, ownership of the ships was temporarily transferred to Russell & Co. in order to avoid seizure by French forces, but after hostilities had ceased, they were purchased back by CMSNCo., for the same price they had been sold for.

The company enjoyed profitability for a few years under Sheng's directorship and began paying out annual dividends. However, by 1904, the company's finances had once again slipped into losses. Sheng, who had appointed a whole series of corrupt cronies to the management during his tenure, was eased out of control in 1911 when Dr. Wu Ting-fang took over as managing director with a view to reorganizing the company.

By 1912, the fleet size of the company had grown to 29 coastal and river steamers, all crewed by foreign (mainly British) captains.

During the early 20th century up until the time of the revolution, there was a long and continual power struggle between Sheng and the various shareholders over control of the company. Following the revolution, in June 1913, shareholders of the CMSNCo. agreed to a scheme for the company to be reorganized with a new constitution. The company at this time possessed 31 ships and owned wharves and property in some 20 Chinese ports, with total assets valued at an estimated 25 million taels of silver.

Following Sheng's death in 1916, Li Hongzhang's grandson, Li Guojie (Chinese: 李国杰), was appointed as a board director of CMSNCo. Li Guojie had previously served as the Chinese Minister to Belgium (1910-1912). In 1924 he was elected as chairman of the board of directors.

=== Civil war period ===
In 1927, Li continued to head the company although the entire Chinese shipping industry was placed under the supervision of the Communications Ministry of the Nationalist government. In 1929, the Nationalist government commenced investigations into past financial dealings of the company, and in particular those of the late Sheng Xianhuai. After uncovering evidence of impropriety, the Jiangsu Provincial Government ordered the confiscation of assets from Sheng's estate. Li Guojie also came under suspicion for misappropriating funds from the company and for taking out personal bank loans secured on the company's assets. This culminated in a lawsuit again Li to recover lost monies.

The scandal escalated when on 24 July 1930, Zhao Tieqiao, a senior member of the Shanghai Investment Promotion Bureau tasked with investigating past financial irregularities, was assassinated outside the company's offices in Shanghai. Li immediately fell under suspicion but lacking sufficient he was instead detained on economic fraud charges relating to obtaining personal foreign loans using state-owned assets as collateral. He was convicted and sentenced to 3 years imprisonment. However, through his political connections he was soon released. Li remained in Shanghai, heavily involved in the corrupt political power struggles prevalent in that era. He was shot outside his Shanghai home on 19 February 1939 and died soon afterwards.

The firm was nationalized and reorganized as the China Merchants Group in 1935, acquiring the name it uses today. During the Sino-Japanese war, the company sold four of its ships: Haiyuan, Haili, Haichen and Haiheng to the Hong Kong-based trading company Jardine Matheson & Co. Other ships were scuttled during the hostilities.

During World War II, the headquarters moved around, being for a period in Hong Kong and at Chongqing.

After the defeat of Japan in the Second Sino-Japanese War, the Nationalist government confiscated industrial enterprises in formerly Japanese-occupied areas of China and in Japanese puppet states. These confiscated enterprises were re-organized into Chinese state-owned enterprises, primarily under the control of China Merchants Steam Navigation Company, the National Resources Commission, and China Textile Construction Corporation. The company also took over control of 2,158 formerly Japanese ships.

=== Post-Civil War split ===
In 1949, following the Chinese Civil War, the company's head office was transferred together with the Republic of China government from the Mainland to Taiwan. On December 28, 1972, because Communist China obtained the "Chinese seat" in the United Nations, in order to prevent Communist China from taking over the assets of the original CMSNCo, the CMSNCo in Taiwan invested in Yang Ming Marine Transport Corporation, thereby transferring assets to Yang Ming Marine Transport. In March 1995, The Taipei-based part of CMSNCo finally merged with Yang Ming Marine Transport Corporation.

Meanwhile, the People's Republic of China retained ownership of some of the company's ships and of the Hong Kong subsidiary, allowing the latter to retain its name (China Merchants Steam Navigation Company Limited) to avoid legal disputes. In 1950, transfer of the original core company was moved to its Hong Kong headquarters but with overall control still being retained by the PRC.

== Modern history (since 1978) ==
The company slipped into relative obscurity during the Mao era. This only changed with China's opening of its economy in 1978, when the free-trade zones created in China led to the company's revival. On 31 January 1979, Yuan Geng became the first CEO of the PRC-owned company. Yuan had founded the Shekou Industrial Zone in Shenzhen and was made CMG CEO following Beijing's approval of the zone proposal, making it a corner stone of the first special economic zone in Shenzhen as part of Deng Xiaoping's reformist policies. CMG subsequently developed a reputation for its successful Port-Park-City model, which is also referred to as the Shekou Model.

Throughout its development of the Shekou Zone during the 1980s and 1990s, CMG got involved in business sectors beyond shipping, including investing in and operation of amenities, social and industrial infrastructures, numerous industrial ventures from containers to food manufacturing, real estate and finance. In 1987, it founded the first joint-stock bank in the PRC, China Merchants Bank, making it a "highways-to-banking conglomerate".

Although CMG was involved in numerous horizontal businesses, in 2001 this was rationalized to three "core business sectors", namely transport infrastructures, financial, as well as property development and industrial park operations.

Since the Chinese government's adoption of the Belt and Road Initiative in 2013, CMG has been playing a major role in furthering the policy through its flagship port business. CMG has been seeking to expand international operations accordingly. Besides operating in Hong Kong and Mainland China, CMG now has operations in strategic locations across South Asia, Europe, for example in Greece, Lithuania and Belarus, and Africa, including most notably Nigeria and Djibouti.

CMG became active in Nigeria in 2010 with the acquisition of a 47.5% stake in the Tin Can Island Container Terminal in Lagos. CMG became involved in Djibouti in 2013, when it acquired a 23.5% stake in the Doraleh container terminal. In January 2021, Djibouti and CMG signed a deal for the Chinese conglomerate to expand the Port of Djibouti at a cost of $350 million. The development plan will follow the Shekou Zone model.

In 2014, the Hong Kong media reported that the CCP's Central Commission for Discipline Inspection was conducting a special investigation into CMG, along with several other SOEs, on corruption claims.

In January 2024, BAR Technologies signed a deal with China Merchant's CM Energy Tech (CMET) to manufacture, supply, and sell BAR's WindWings wing sail for installation on new and existing vessels in China and throughout Asia. The WindWings system with route optimisation system saves up to 1.5 tonnes of fuel per sailing vessel per day. This reduces daily carbon dioxide emissions by 4.9 tonnes, accelerating the decarbonisation of the Chinese shipping sector.

China Merchants Energy Shipping (CMES) has ordered four methanol dual-fuel car carriers, two kamsarmax bulkers and two multipurpose carriers for $508 million in 2023. Deliveries are expected in 2025-26.

== House flag ==
1872 to 1873

1873 to 1942

1942 to 1951 (until 1972 in Taiwan)

1951 to 1984

== Structure ==
China Merchants Group Limited owns 12 main subsidiaries across its core business sectors, employing 230,000 people:

- China Merchants Ports Holdings Company Limited (CMPort)
- China Merchants Finance Holdings Co., Ltd (CMF)
- China Merchants Energy Shipping Co., Ltd (CMES)
- China Merchants Industry Group Co., Ltd (CMI)
- China Merchants Hoi Tung Trading Company Co., Ltd (CM Hoi Tung)
- China Merchants Investment Development Co., Ltd (CMID)
- China Merchants Shekou Holdings (CM Shekou)
- China Merchants Expressway Network & Technology Co., Ltd (CMET)
- China Merchants Logistics Holding Group Co., Ltd (CML)
- Zhangzhou China Merchants Economic and Technological Development Zone (CMZD)
- China Merchants Chongqing Communication Research and Design Institute Co., Ltd (CMCT)
- China Merchants Venture Capital Management Co., Ltd
- CMI Weihai Shipyards

=== Notable subsidiaries ===
- China Merchants Bank
- China Merchants Capital
- China Merchants Energy Shipping
- China Merchants Port
- China Merchants Property
- China Merchants Securities Company
- Ping An Insurance
- Wing Lung Bank

== Notable projects ==
=== Port of Djibouti ===
Controversy surrounds the way in which CMG acquired the 23.5% stake in the Doraleh terminal. CMG was sold the stake after Djibouti's government seized the facilities from Dubai-based port operator DP World, co-manager of the facilities since a concession agreement in 2004. One year later, CMG got authorization to construct another port facility, the Doraleh multi-purpose port located within the Chinese military support base. This coincided with Djibouti and CMG establishing the International Free Trade Zone.

In 2018, Djibouti terminated DP World's concession rights, nationalized its shares in the terminal and handed them on to China Merchants Group. Although the Djibouti government has stated it alone controls the port, media reports indicate that CMG is directing day-to-day activities.

DP World sued CMG in 2019 in Hong Kong for allegedly causing Djibouti to revoke its concession rights. The London Court of International Arbitration ruled in 2020 that Djibouti's actions constituted a breach of contract and ordered Djibouti to return the concession to DP World, but the country rejected the ruling. Thus far, there have been seven rulings in DP World's favor in the matter, most recently in July 2021, all of which have been rejected by the Djibouti government.

=== Hambantota Port development ===
CMG's development of Sri Lanka's Hambantota port is considered part of the Belt and Road Initiative. Proposals for developing port preceded the BRI, however. The Sri Lankan government proposed the project, and contracted with CMG to develop it in 2010.

In 2017, Sri Lanka approved an agreement with CMG regarding the Hambantota port, according to which the company would take a majority stake in the port, in exchange for debt forgiveness. This had caused concern that the facilities could be used for Chinese military vessels and that such a large-scale transfer of land could adversely impact Sri Lanka's national sovereignty.

As of 2018, the port was being referred to as a "Chinese colony" by critics and described by them as "debt diplomacy", because CMG provided $1.1 billion in funds to the highly indebted government for the port in exchange for an 85% stake and a 99-year lease. This allowed China to gain a geostrategic foothold in close proximity to India, one of its main rivals in the Indo-Pacific, India, as well as to important commerce and military waterways.

Writing in 2023, academic and former UK diplomat Kerry Brown states that China's relationship to the Hambantota port has become the opposite of the theorized debt-trap modus operandi. Brown observes that China has had to commit more money to the project, expose itself to further risk, and has had to become entangled in complex local politics.As of 2024, the port has not been a significant economic success, although shipping through the port is on the increase.
