= Libyan Railways =

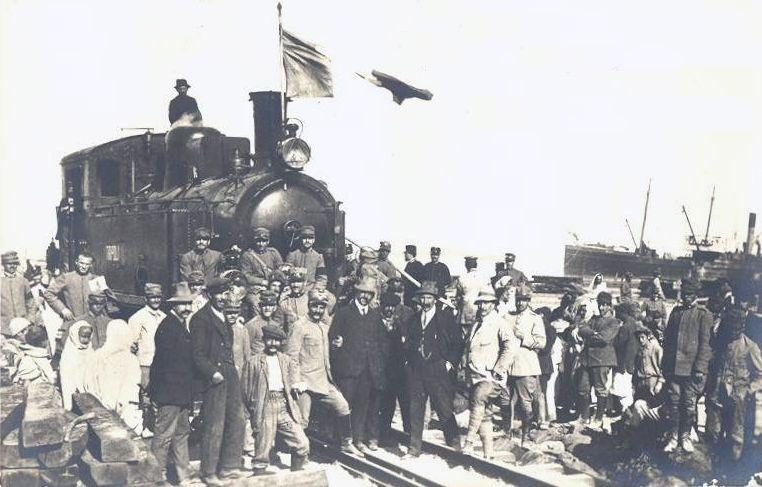
The first Italian Locomotive arrived in the Tripoli port

Libyan railways are the Italian colonial railways in Italian Libya. They are related to the development of the railways in the Italian Empire. This history started with the opening in 1888 of a short section of line in Italian Eritrea, and ended in 1947 with the loss of Italian Libya after the Allied offensive in North Africa and the destruction of the railways around Italian Tripoli. The railways in the Italian colonial empire reached 1,561 km before World War II.

== History ==
The construction of railways in the African Italian colonies (Eritrea, Libya and Somalia) did not have, for various reasons, a great development compared to that promoted by other European countries on the same continent.

The first rail lines were built mainly for war needs in the absence of efficient means of communication in the occupied territories, after the conquests of Eritrea and Libya. However, were quite limited in the first decades of occupation.

In 1940 the amount of railways in operation, between Italian East Africa and Libya, amounted to 1,556 km of which, however, the 693 km of the Italian section of the Railway Djibouti-Addis Abeba were pre-existing and built by the French Empire for Ethiopia.

The railways were built by Italy from the outset with little potential, because built with narrow gauge rails and with light metal type, and were never of great economic importance because isolated from the lines of neighboring states. Indeed, the choice of a gauge 950 mm, different from the meter gauge usually used in Africa, contributed to this effect.

Today most of these Italian colonial railways have disappeared: those of Somalia after the British occupation in 1941-1945. The Libyan ones were suppressed in the 1960s, but in the same decade the Eritrean railway between Asmara and Massawa was reactivated after long neglect of trafficking.

== Italian Libya railways history ==
In Italian Libya the first railways were created by the Italians after their conquest of Tripoli in 1911. The first section was done in 1912 from the port of Tripoli to Ain Zara, with 11 km of rails using a track gauge of 950 mm. By the end of the same year were done another 39 km until Tagiura and Zanzur.

From May 1913 the Italian Ferrovie dello Stato started to manage the railways, with the "Royal Law #314". In 1915 the railways in Libya had an extension of 180 km, reaching from Tripoli the cities of Zanzur/Sorman and Bivio Gheran/Henschirelabiad. After World War I were completed all the works (with the railways Stations) in the 118 km of the Tripoli-Zuara.

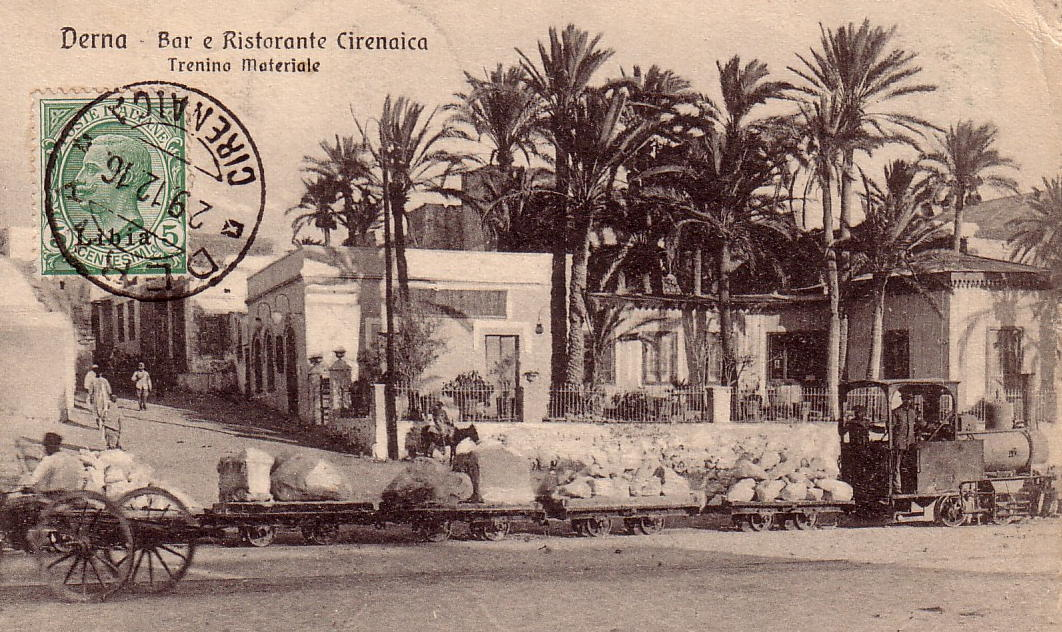
Derna - Bar and restaurant Cirenaica - Goods train (stamped on 29 December 1916)

The construction of the lines in Cyrenaica began later: the first lines were in fact only small decauville trains on purely military track, in the Italian Benghazi and Cyrenaica area. Another small decauville was built around the port of Derna. In the fall of 1914 19 km long section was opened between Benghazi and Benina and two years later the next section. Between 1926 and 1927 other sections were opened to Barce, completing the 108 km line from Benghazi. At the end of 1926 approximately 56 km of railway were added between Benghazi and Soluch.

In the 1930s there were five small railway lines in Italian Libya, 3 in Tripolitania and 2 in Cyrenaica: Tripoli - Zuara; Tripoli - Vertice; Tripoli - Tagiura; Benghazi - Barce and Benghazi - Soluch.

The Italian authorities -after the construction of these initial 400 km of railways in five lines around Tripoli and Benghazi- decided to give priority to the construction of roads in Libya, when Benito Mussolini took control of the Italian colonies. However Italian experts studied the possibility of building a "Transaharan railway" from Libya to the gulf of Guinea in cooperation with the French authorities: but it remained only a colonial dream. After 1927 no more railways were made in Libya, but during World War II the need of railways transport to the front during the war in the frontier with British Egypt changed this approach.

In 1940 was started the study of connecting the Tripoli-Zuara with the Tunisia border: in summer 1941 were nearly ready all the 60 km of this track line, that were not activated because was given priority to a new line from Tripoli toward Egypt (because of the needs for the war against the British Empire).

So, in spring 1941 the Italian government started the construction of a new railway (with a standard African track gauge of 1435 mm) between Tripoli and Tobruk. But by December 1942 all was stopped because of the Italian defeat in north Africa: of the 1040 km only 18 km were fully done in Tripolitania, while 40 km were partially ready in Cirenaica from Barce toward Derna. In summer 1942 was conquered by the Italians (with Rommel's Afrika Korps) the railways line built by the British and New Zealanders from Egypt until Tobruk, near the Egyptian-Libyan border. But a few months later the Marsa Matruk-Sollum-Tobruk line was back in Allies control.

Until the 1950s the railways remained active. But by the 1960s there were only two small railways in Libya, departing from Benghazi and using classical Littorine: Benghazi-Barce and Benghazi-Soluch. In 1965 the last remaining stations in Benghazi and Soluch were closed. Today no active railway exists in Libya.

== Bibliography ==
- Maggi, Stefano. Le ferrovie nell’Africa italiana: aspetti economici, sociali e strategici, seminario "Nineteenth century transport history. Current trends and new problems".Istituto Universitario Europeo, Fiesole, 1994
- Molino, Nico. Linee Ferroviarie. Littorina in "Mondo Ferroviario # 55". Editoriale del Garda, Rivoltella, 1991.
- Ogliari, Francesco. Le ferrovie coloniali italiane in Africa (in "Tutto TRENO & Storia", n. 4, 2000, p. 46-69). Duegi Editrice, Albignasego, 2000.
