= Addis Ababa–Djibouti Railway =

International railway line serving Ethiopia and Djibouti

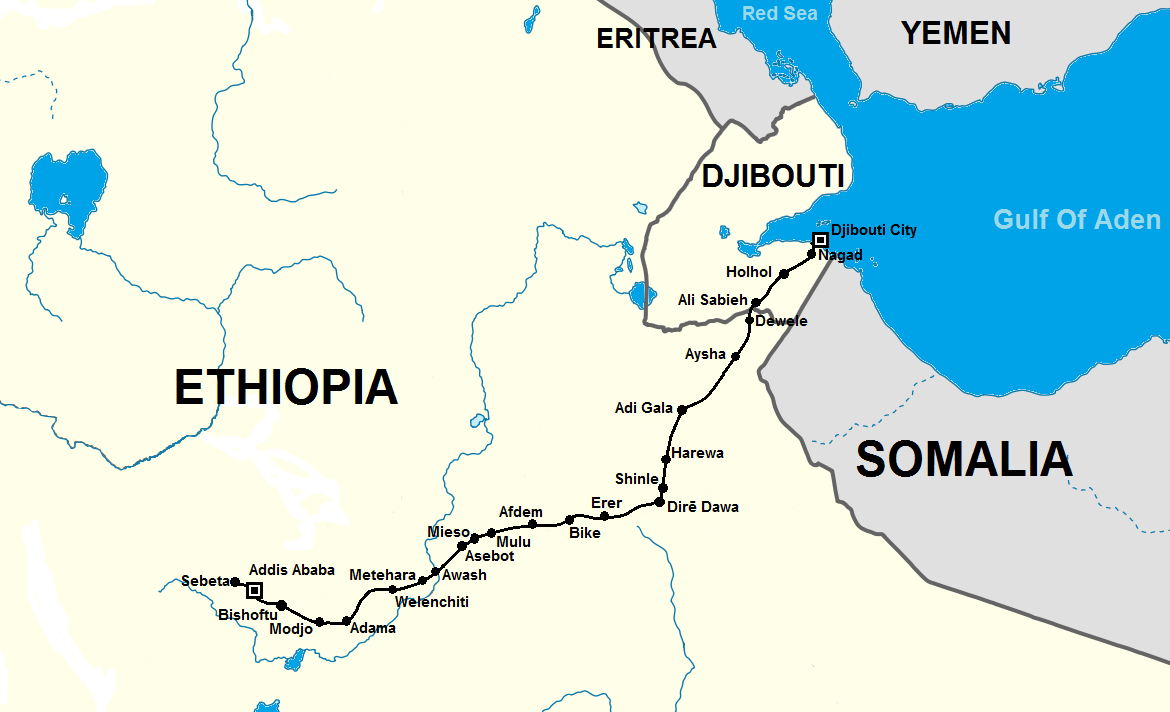
- Schematic diagram of the Addis Ababa-Djibouti Railway.

Overview
- Status: Operational
- Owner: Ethiopia, Djibouti
- Locale: Ethiopia, Djibouti
- Termini: Sebeta, Ethiopia; Port of Doraleh, Djibouti
- Stations: 21 (15 for passengers)

Service
- Type: Heavy rail
- System: Ethiopian Railway; Djiboutian Railways
- Operator(s): Ethio-Djibouti Standard Gauge Railway Share Company (from 2024); China Railway Group Ltd. (until 2023); China Civil Engineering Construction Corp. (until 2023)
- Rolling stock: 41 locomotives, 1,130 coaches/wagons

History
- Opened: January 1, 2018; 8 years ago
- Inauguration: 5 October 2016 (Ethiopia); 10 January 2017 (Djibouti)
- Commercial operation: 1 January 2018

Technical
- Line length: 759 km (472 mi)
- Num of tracks: single-/double- track
- Track gauge: 1,435 mm (4 ft 8 1/2 in) standard gauge
- Loading gauge: 5300 mm
- Minimum radius: 800–1,200 m (2,600–3,900 ft)
- Electrification: Overhead line 25 kV AC / 50 Hz
- Operating speed: 120 km/h (75 mph) (passenger); 80 km/h (50 mph) (freight)
- Signalling: automatic block & ETCS-2
- Highest elevation: 2,293 m (7,523 ft)
- Maximum incline: 1.85%
Route map
Rail route

The Addis Ababa–Djibouti Railway (Amharic: አዲስ አበባ–ጅቡቲ የባቡር መስመር; French: Chemin de fer Addis Abeba–Djibouti, Oromo: Daandii baaburaa Finfinneefi Jibutii, Somali: Jidka Tareenka ee Addis Ababa-Jabuuti) is a standard gauge international railway that serves as the backbone of the new Ethiopian National Railway Network. The railway was inaugurated by Prime Minister Hailemariam Desalegn on January 1, 2018. It provides landlocked Ethiopia with access to the sea, linking Ethiopia's capital of Addis Ababa with Djibouti and its Port of Doraleh. More than 95% of Ethiopia's trade passes through Djibouti, accounting for 70% of the activity at the Port of Djibouti.

The total railway capacity is 24.9 million tonnes of freight annually. Traffic was project to reach 6 million tonnes annually by 2023, but in 2025 it handled only 3.2 tonnes. Although infrastructure to connect the railway to the Port of Doraleh was not completed by the completion of the initial segments, they were constructed over the next several years, with the goal of expanding the annual cargo handling capacity from 6 to 14 million tonnes, with the aim of reaching 10 million tonnes of cargo by 2022.

In 2019 the railway transported 84 073 passengers and generated US$1.2 million in revenue from that service, less than in 2018. In 2019 the railway generated US$40 million in both passenger and cargo revenue, far below the operating cost of US$70 million. During the first half of 2020, the railway transported 0.7 million tonnes of freight.

== Railway ==
=== Operator ===
The railway line is jointly owned by both the Djiboutian and Ethiopian governments. In Ethiopia, the state-owned Ethiopian Railway Corporation represents the owner of the railway.

The Ethio-Djibouti Standard Gauge Rail Transport S.C., a bi-national public company headquartered in Addis Ababa, was formed in 2017 to operate the railway. It is owned by the governments of Ethiopia (75% share) and Djibouti (25% share). Ethiopia holds the CEO post, represented through the Ethiopian Minister of Transport. The company currently occupies an administrative role, but it will take over railway operations at the beginning of 2024.

Through 2023, all operations on the new railway will be undertaken jointly by the China Railway Group Limited (CREC) and the China Civil Engineering Construction Corporation (CCECC). During this time, the companies will train local employees so that they can take over railway operations at the conclusion of the initial operation period. The Ethiopian Railway Corporation has also established the African Railway Academy in Bishoftu to graduate rail engineers.

=== Route ===
The Addis Ababa–Djibouti Railway runs roughly parallel to the old metre-gauge Ethio–Djibouti Railway for most of its length. However, the standard-gauge railway is built on a new, straighter right-of-way that allows for much higher speeds. New stations have been built outside city centres, and most of the old railway stations have been decommissioned. There are 68 viaducts and bridges, comprising 3% of the railway's total length. There are no tunnels.

The total length of the railway line is 759 km (472 mi), of which 754 km (469 mi) run between the two terminal stations at Sebeta and the Port of Doraleh. The remaining five kilometers are for shunting operations. A total of 666 km (414 mi) of the railway line is in Ethiopia, while a total of 93 km (58 mi) is in Djibouti. The 115 km (71 mi) section from Sebeta to Adama is the only double-track section of the line, and it also has the highest grades with a net elevation loss of 650 meters. It features several viaducts with lengths of up to 800 meters. The remainder of the railway is single-track, with passing loops distributed evenly along its length.

The railway begins at Sebeta, just outside of Ethiopia's capital of Addis Ababa. The city is served by two stations in its southern outskirts, at Furi-Lebu and Indode. The line then runs southeast to Modjo and Adama, both towns located in the Ethiopian Great Rift Valley. At Modjo, a railway junction exists for the planned Modjo–Hawassa Railway. In addition, at Modjo the railway is connected to the Modjo Dry Port, Ethiopia's most important inland dry port and also Ethiopia's main hub for domestic and international freight services.

At Adama, the railway turns northeast towards Dire Dawa. At Awash, there is a junction with the Awash–Hara Gebeya Railway, which is under construction as of 2018. Directly after Awash station, the line crosses 60 meters above the Awash River canyon over a 155 meter long bridge, the main bridge of the railway. The railway then proceeds to Dire Dawa, where it turns and heads directly for Djibouti. Crossing the Ethiopia-Djibouti border between Dewale and Ali Sabieh, the line reaches the Djibouti passenger terminal at Nagad railway station, near Djibouti–Ambouli International Airport. Freight trains continue the last 12 km (7.5 mi) to the Port of Doraleh on diesel power.

=== Stations ===
There are 21 dedicated railway stations along the railway; all of them can serve as passing loop stations, as they have three tracks or more (except the Adigala station which has only two tracks). Four of the 21 railway stations are designed as passing loops only, so there is no freight loading / unloading or passenger service. Two of the remaining 17 stations are freight yards only and two others will be for passengers only. The remaining 13 stations can handle both passenger services as well as freight loading / unloading.

The 15 passenger stations usually have a single boarding platform, with a station building attached to it. The platforms are about 200, 300, or 400 meters long. The Awash station, the only one with three platforms, is also located along the railway but also at the junction point with the Awash–Hara Gebeya Railway. The Furi-Lebu and Dewale stations have two platforms. All station buildings along the line contain facilities for ticketing and refreshment, and they even have prayer rooms. The architecture of the station buildings (except that of Awash station) is eclectic, featuring traditional Ethiopian elements with some Chinese interpretation.

=== Specifications ===
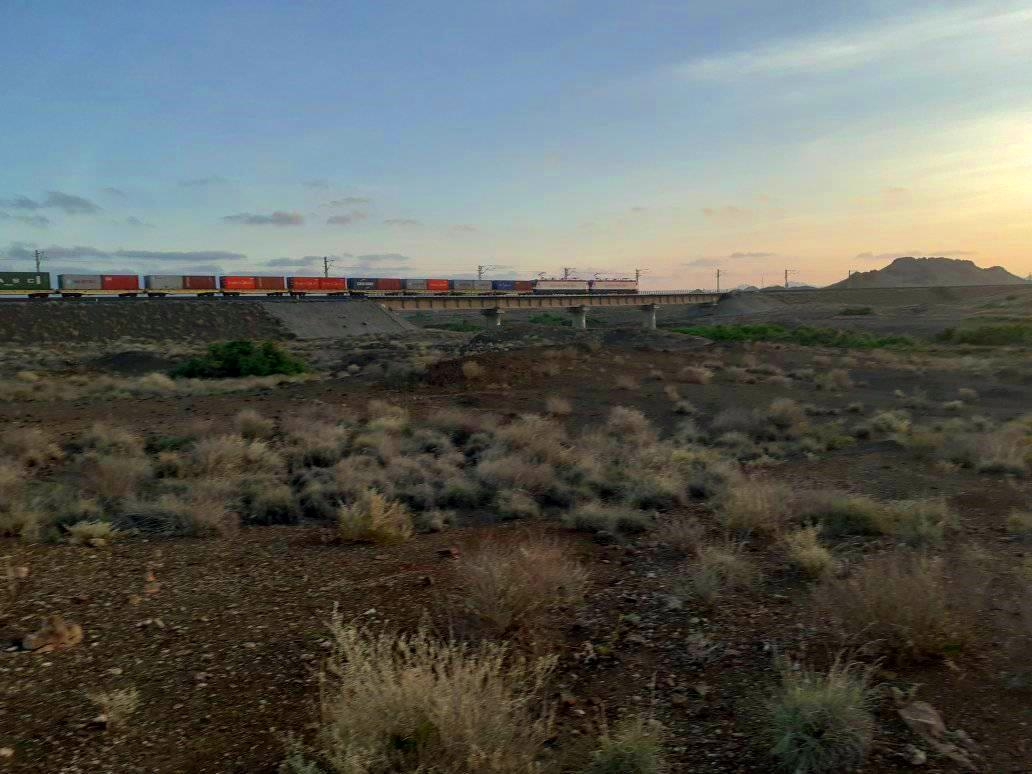
The Addis Ababa–Djibouti Railway, near Dasbiyo.

The Addis Ababa–Djibouti Railway was based on the Chinese National Railway Class 2 Standard. However, some changes were made at the request of the Ethiopian Railway Corporation. Ethiopia is not a member of the Northern Corridor Integration Project, which has selected the Chinese Class 1 standard for all of its railways.

- Gauge: Standard gauge
- Couplers: Janney AAR
- Brakes: Air
- Electrification: Overhead catenary 25 kV AC / 50 Hz
- Target speed (passenger): 120 km/h (75 mph)
- Target speed (freight): 80 km/h (50 mph)
- Maximum train load (freight): 3,500 ± 93 tonnes (3,445 ± 92 long tons; 3,858 ± 103 short tons) gross
- Designed transport capacity: 20 million tonnes annually
- Gross transport capacity: 24.9 million tonnes annually (taking double-track sections into account)
- Minimum railway curve radius: 1,200 m (3,900 ft) (800 m or 2,600 ft at difficult locations)
- Maximum (ruling) gradient:1.85% (1 in 54)
- Length of arrival & departure track at passing loops: 850 m (dual locomotive: 880 m) [resulting max. train length ~800 m]
- Maximum vehicle loading gauge
  - height: 5300 mm
  - width: 3400 mm
- Trains run on the: Left
- Railway signalling & train protection system: automatic block signaling & ETCS-2 SIL4
- Level crossings: permitted (no full grade separation)
- Double-stack ISO containers = 2 x 2.4m or 2 x 2.9m (unknown).

The operators of the railway consider an annual freight tonnage that is far below the railway limits. As a rule of thumb, the operators foresee an annual freight tonnage increase of about one million tonne per year, starting at 1–2 million tonnes in the first year of operations.

Although road traffic in Ethiopia drives on the right, trains drive on the left in the double-track sections. This is consistent with Chinese railway practice. The single-track sections are equipped with passing loops, each of which is triple-track so that two trains can wait for the main line to clear. Each station also serves as a passing loop.

The railway line is almost fully electrified. Power is transmitted at 230 kV and 130 kV to eight substations. Traction power is supplied at 35.8 km intervals, with 18+1 stations in Ethiopia and three in Djibouti. General electrification ends after the Djibouti–Nagad passenger station. Trains are pulled by diesel locomotives to reach the Port of Doraleh and cargo terminals at inland dry ports. This is necessary to avoid interference between the overhead catenary and loading cranes.

=== Rolling stock ===
The rolling stock is allocated from the National Railway Network of Ethiopia.

All the rolling stock had been purchased by Ethiopian Railways Corporation (ERC). All the rolling stock has been transferred to the Ethio-Djibouti Standard Gauge Railway Share Company (EDR) which operates the railway as a share kind contribution by ERC. EDR owns these rolling stocks. EDR is also expected to procure additional rolling stocks to expand its operations. Djibouti did not buy any rolling stock, and even shunting operations at Djibouti's Port of Doraleh will be performed by EDR rolling stock and EDR personnel. Djibouti chose to pay its share on railway construction instead of buying vehicles.

=== Handover ===
After six years of operating, control of the railway was transferred from the Chinese Railway Construction Corporation to a joint operating agreement between the Ethiopian and Djiboutian governments.

== History ==
Construction began in 2011 and was largely complete in 2016, but final testing continued through 2017. The line was formally opened for commercial operations on 1 January 2018.

=== Decline of the metre-gauge railway ===
The Addis Ababa–Djibouti railway supersedes the Ethio-Djibouti Railway, a metre-gauge railway that was originally built by the French from 1894 to 1917, which for some time in the 20th century was the only way to reach Ethiopia from the outside world. As the railway deteriorated in the 1980s due to a lack of spare parts and maintenance, Addis Ababa lost railroad access to the sea by 2004. Rail service ran between Dire Dawa and Djibouti City until 2010 and then again from 2013 to 2014. Since 2014, operation has only been possible on 213 km of rehabilitated tracks in Ethiopia between Dire Dawa and the border with Djibouti at Guelile. The connection between the commercial centres of Ethiopia (e.g. Addis Ababa) and the sea ports in Djibouti had been broken.

=== Construction (2011–2016) ===
At that time, Ethiopia initiated an ambitious Growth and Transformation Plan (GTP) to develop the country's economy through infrastructure investment. A new electrified standard gauge railway was expected to reduce cargo transit times from three days by road to twelve hours by train, and cargo transport costs to one-third of the cost of road transport. In 2011, the Ethiopian Railway Corporation (ERC) awarded contracts for railway construction from Addis Ababa to the Djibouti border to two Chinese state-owned companies, the China Railway Group (CREC) and the China Civil Engineering Construction Corporation (CCECC).

The 320 kilometres (200 mi) stretch from Sebeta to Mieso was awarded to CREC, and the 339 kilometres (211 mi) section from Mieso to the Djibouti border was awarded to CRCC. In 2012, Djibouti selected CRCC to complete the final 100 km to the port of Djibouti. The total costs of the railway amounted to US$1.873 billion for the Sebeta-Mieso section, US$1.12 billion for the Mieso–Dewele section and US$525 million for the Dewele–Port of Doraleh section.

In 2013, loans totalling US$3 billion were secured from the Exim Bank of China, with US$2.4 billion going to the Ethiopian section of the railway and the balance to be spent in Djibouti. Additional funding was secured from the China Development Bank and the Industrial and Commercial Bank of China. 20,000 Ethiopians and 5,000 Djiboutians were hired for construction work. Track-laying was completed on the Mieso–Djibouti segment of the project in June 2015.

In 2015, farmers in Ethiopia had suffered crop failures of between 50% and 90% due to a catastrophic drought, and the port of Djibouti was backed up with ships waiting to unload grain for hungry Ethiopians. Although construction was still in progress on some sections, the completed portion of the railway was put into emergency operation in November 2015 to carry grain to drought-stricken Ethiopia.

The officially completed Ethiopian section was formally inaugurated on 5 October 2016 in the new Furi-Labu railway station in Addis Ababa, by the presidents of Ethiopia and Djibouti. On 10 January 2017, the 100 km section of Djibouti side was inaugurated in a ceremony held in the new Nagad railway station of Djibouti City by Djibouti's President Ismail Omar Guelleh and Ethiopia's prime minister Hailemariam Dessalegn, and the director general of the International Union of Railways (UIC), Jean-Pierre Loubinoux.

A survey of East African railway projects by the Ugandan government in early 2017 revealed that the actual costs of the Addis Ababa–Djibouti Railway were around US $5.2m per km, resulting in total costs of around US $4.5b. This is approximately 30% more than originally planned.

=== Trial service (2016–2017) ===
The two prime contractors, CREC and CCECC, formed a consortium to operate the entire railway for the first 3–5 years, while local personnel are trained. Despite being inaugurated in October 2016 and January 2017, Djiboutian authorities still considered the railway to be under construction and expected it to become operational not before the end of 2017.

An official trial service began on the railway after inauguration in October 2016. On 9 May 2017, the first thorough stress test was conducted, with more than 30 trains on the line at the same time. Passenger trains ran between Furi-Labu and Dire Dawa, while freight services ran between the Port of Doraleh and the Modjo Dry Port near Mojo railway station. Shortage of electrical power has been blamed for test failures. The railway finally began commercial operations on 1 January 2018.

=== Further extension to Yemen ===
There are plans about further extension of the Addis Ababa-Djibouti railway to Yemen via mixed-use 32 km (20 mi)-long Bridge of the Horns but cancelled by various reasons (e.g. Yemeni Civil War since 2014 and tectonically active circum-Arabian Plate that caused earthquakes raging in Turkey).

== Railway integration ==
The construction of the railway line was an EPC/Turnkey project. However, the accompanying infrastructure was neglected, and the railway was not ready to go into commercial operation at its commissioning.

=== Main issues ===
The railway line was built without access roads or freight trunk connections to existing sea and dry ports, industrial zones, and other storage depots. It was official policy to prioritize low initial construction costs, as the integration work was considered to be "easy and quick". Another official said that railway integration was too complex to consider at the planning stage, as many local authorities would have to coordinate their efforts.

As one of the many consequences, most railway stations are far outside the city centers and even outside the towns and cities they are intended to serve. For example, the Dire Dawa train station is located 10 km away from Dire Dawa. Due to a lack of inter-country coordination, the Port of Doraleh in Djibouti, despite being the main cargo terminus for the railway, was not linked to the railway. No spur lines were built to the three different terminals in question, and the infrastructure for handling bulk goods and fuels was totally missing.

After the inauguration of the Addis Ababa–Djibouti Railway at the end of 2016, the Ethiopian Railway Corporation (ERC) in Ethiopia found itself with debt equal to one-third of Ethiopia's annual state budget. As a result, there was no additional funding available to complete the surrounding infrastructure necessary to place the railway into commercial operation.

=== Measures to overcome the issues ===
State-owned companies other than the ERC stepped in to build and construct the needed infrastructure. Active in particular was the Ethiopian Shipping and Logistics Enterprise (ESL) to build spurs to facilities like dry ports. Construction of the Dire Dawa Dry Port with a spur line commenced in late 2017. However, it took 12 months just to negotiate the contract for the dry port construction and the construction works turned out to be much more expensive than originally expected.

The construction of a spur line to Modjo Dry Port started in 2017 and was well underway in May 2017. The Modjo Dry Port railway loading and unloading facilities became partially operational at the end of 2017, but are (2018) still not completed.

Djibouti and Ethiopia announce a combined effort to construct the three missing railway facilities at the Port of Doraleh, connections and railway terminals (Djibouti Container Terminal (DCT), Doraleh Multipurpose Port (DMP) and the Horizon Oil Terminal (HDTL)). In the second half of 2017, construction works started at the Port of Doraleh near the DCT to link this container terminal with the railway. By the time it was completed, the combined cost of constructing spurs to DCT and DMP was around $70 million.

The Addis Ababa–Djibouti Railway project provided lessons for other railway projects in Ethiopia. The Awash–Hara Gebeya Railway and the Hara Gebeya–Mek'ele Railway construction projects were expanded to include supporting infrastructure. To make up for the current lack of railway revenues, new and existing railways could be partially outsourced or sold to private investors. To increase utilisation of the railways, any interested railway transportation service provider will be allowed to earn a license to use the existing railway infrastructure.

In 2023, the World Bank's International Development Association provided a $730 million grant to improve the Addis Ababa-Djibouti corridor, including through building rail-port interfaces that would increase the throughput of maritime cargo volume.

== See also ==
- Rail transport in Ethiopia
- East African Railway Master Plan, railway network planned to be linked with this line.
- Railway stations in Ethiopia
