= Port of Doraleh =

Shipping terminal in Djibouti City, Djibouti

- Interactive map of Port of Doraleh

Location
- Country: Djibouti
- Location: Balbala
- Coordinates: 11.590°N 43.095°E
- UN/LOCODE: DJDCT

Details
- Owned by: China Merchants Group, DP World
- No. of berths: 15

The Port of Doraleh is an extension of the Port of Djibouti, located 5 km west of Djibouti City. The multipurpose port has terminals for handling oil, bulk cargo, containers and livestock. It was partially owned and operated by DP World and China Merchants Holdings, until its container facility was seized by the government of Djibouti in February 2018. China’s first overseas military base is near the port.

== Operations ==
=== Doraleh Multipurpose Port ===
The Doraleh Multipurpose Port (DMP) has a total of 15 berths over a 4 km long quay. One of the berths is reserved for the use of the Chinese Navy, which has a base on the western edge of the port. All of the terminals have direct access to the Addis Ababa–Djibouti Railway, which provides landlocked Ethiopia with railroad access to the sea.

The port is called by major shipping services in the region, including:

- OCEAN Alliance Red Sea Express 2
- Maersk Line Horn of Africa
- Maersk Line MECL
- MSC Australia Express
- CMA CGM and Hapag-Lloyd EPIC1/IPAK
- CMA CGM Mona Express
- CMA CGM and Emirates Swahili Express
- CMA CGM and COSCO India Middle East Mediterranean Express
- PIL Red Sea Gulf Service
- COSCO and Yang Ming Red Sea Express

==== Livestock terminal ====
The livestock terminal at Doraleh Multipurpose Port was inaugurated in January 2021 in partnership with Ethiopia. The facility can handle 2.5 million animals per year, or 1,000 heads of camel, 500 heads of cattle and 4,270 heads of goat or sheep per day. The terminal also includes resting areas and quarantine services for the livestock before being shipped on.

=== Container terminal ===
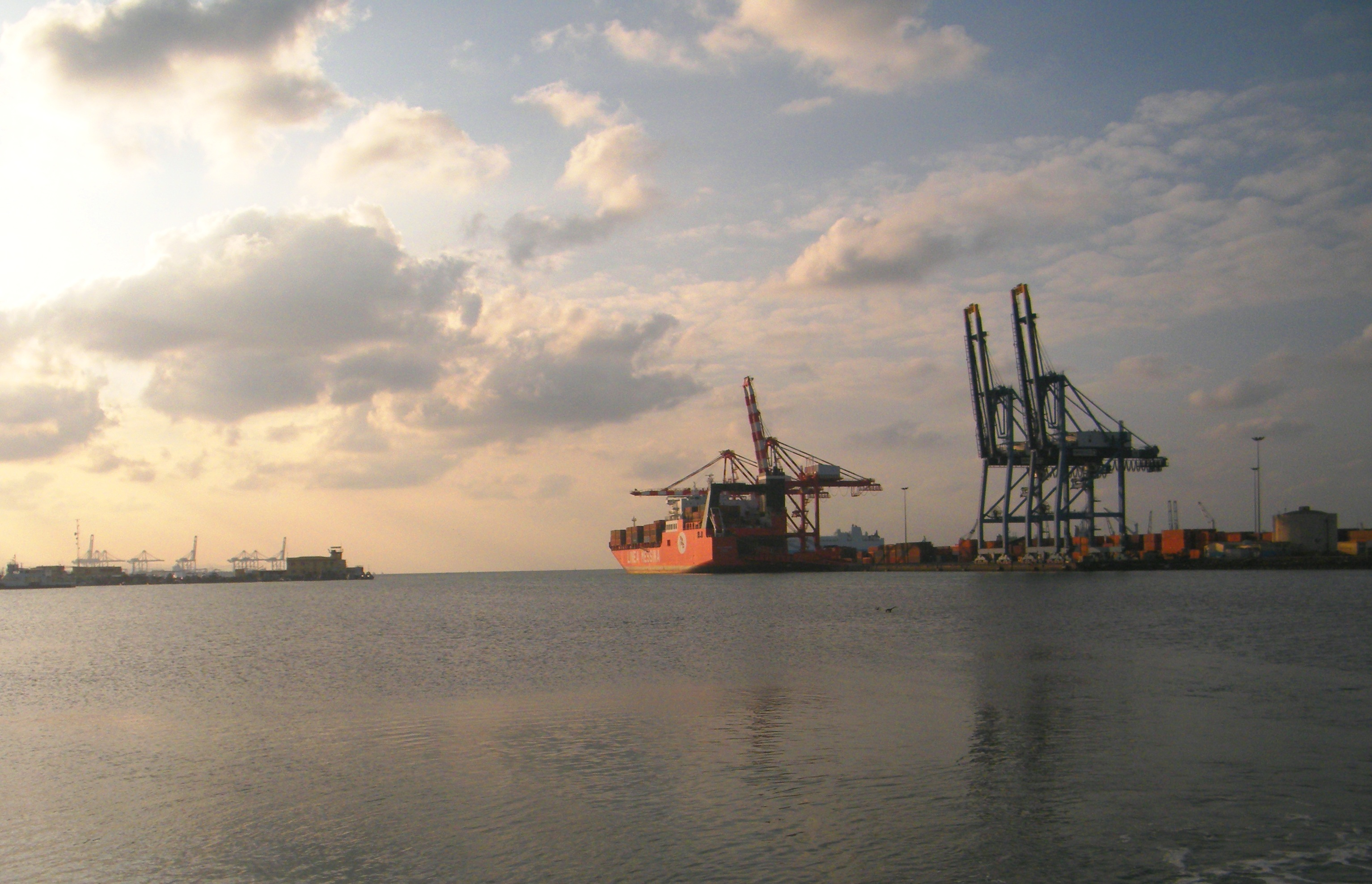
The container terminal at the Port of Djibouti.

The Société De Gestion Du Terminal A Conteneur De Doraleh (SGTD; formerly Doraleh Container Terminal (DCT)) was built in 2009 by the Dubai shipping company DP World after securing a 30-year contract by Djibouti in 2006. The contract was one of a number of others won by DP World in the region, including one in Berbera, Somaliland.

The SGTD's quay is 1050 meters with 18 meters depth and can hold 1.25 million TEU. The facility also operates eight Super-post-Panamax container cranes. An ENOC petroleum terminal is located adjacent to the SGTD. The terminal is the largest employer in Djibouti and its largest source of revenue.

In March 2011, the American National Nuclear Security Administration (NNSA) installed radiation detection equipment at the Port of Djibouti, including the container terminal, which allows scanning cargo containers for dangerous nuclear and other radioactive materials. The equipment was part of a joint project between the NNSA and the Djiboutian Ministry of Equipment and Transport that started in 2009.

As of 2015, the SGTD was described as the most technologically advanced container terminal on the African continent.

In 2016, 914,300 containers passed through the port of Doraleh.

==== Djibouti–DP World conflict ====
In 2014, the Djibouti government accused DP World of bribing the head of the port authority, Abdourahman Boreh, and stated that the operating contract was unfair. A London commercial court cleared Boreh of misconduct in 2016.

In November 2017, Djibouti passed legislation allowing it to renegotiate contracts related to strategic infrastructure. In February 2018, on the order of president Ismaïl Omar Guelleh, the Djibouti government seized the facility and placed it under the control of the government-owned Doraleh Container Terminal Management Company, arguing that the DP World contract violated Djibouti's sovereignty. In response, DP world began a new arbitration case in London against the termination of their 30-year contract to manage the port, to secure "compensation for their breach or expropriation." The Djibouti government stated it would engage in "normal compensation procedures" to pay for the nationalization.

The nationalization took place as the United Arab Emirates expanded its influence around the Red Sea and East Africa. At the intersection of the Red Sea and the Gulf of Aden, and located next to the Strait of Bab al-Mandab, Djibouti occupies a strategic position and hosts US, Chinese, French and Italian military bases. According to Al-Jazeera, relations between the UAE-based company and Djibouti were strained after Djibouti denied the UAE permission to build a military base on its territory. After seizing the port from DP World, Djibouti’s government offered China Merchants Ports Holdings (via its subsidiary China Merchants Group) a quarter of the port's stake, in what some analysts have suggested "could represent a payment-in-kind on debt owed to China and affiliated state firms."

In 2017, a tribunal at the London Court of International Arbitration ruled against the Djibouti government's claim that DP World's agreement was unfair, and ordered the government to pay DP World damages.

In 2018, the London High Court prohibited the Djibouti government's port company from interfering with the management of DCT. As per the ruling, the Djibouti government "shall not act as if the joint venture agreement with DP World has been terminated". As of January 2021, seven legal rulings by London courts were won by DP World, with a ruling in July that year "confirming the unlawfulness of Djibouti’s move to terminate its joint venture agreement and transfer its shares to the state." A previous ruling in January 2020 had demanded of Djibouti to pay $533 million in compensation to DP World. An independent analysis has estimated DP World losses to be more than $1 billion. According to DP World, all rulings have been ignored by Djibouti despite the original contract for the concession being governed by English law.

In September 2022, DP World won another ruling at the Court of Appeal of Hong Kong, which dismissed the latest request by China Merchants Port Holdings. DP World and joint venture company Doraleh Container Terminal are bringing multi-billion dollar claims against China Merchants, alleging that it induced the government of Djibouti to expel DP World from the country and hand over the Doraleh terminal to China Merchants.

=== Oil terminal ===
The oil complex is designed to accommodate vessels with a draft of 20 metres. It has a storage capacity of 370,000 m^{3}. It is managed by the company Horizon Djibouti Terminal Limited (HDTL), which is positioned as a major economic player in Djibouti. It wants to create a local supply centre for regional and international hydrocarbons. Djibouti, at the southern outlet of the Red Sea, is located on a wide shipping lane for oil, and as such provides access to the markets of other countries in the Horn of Africa.

Originally designed for 12 annual rotations, the port is now severely overloaded with 28 rotations due to the high demand of oil from Ethiopia, which is forcing tankers to wait their turn out at sea. An extension of the oil terminal to add an extra 100,000 cubic metres of capacity to the current 370,000 cubic meters is in the works.

== See also ==
- Railway stations in Djibouti
