= List of railway stations in Eritrea =

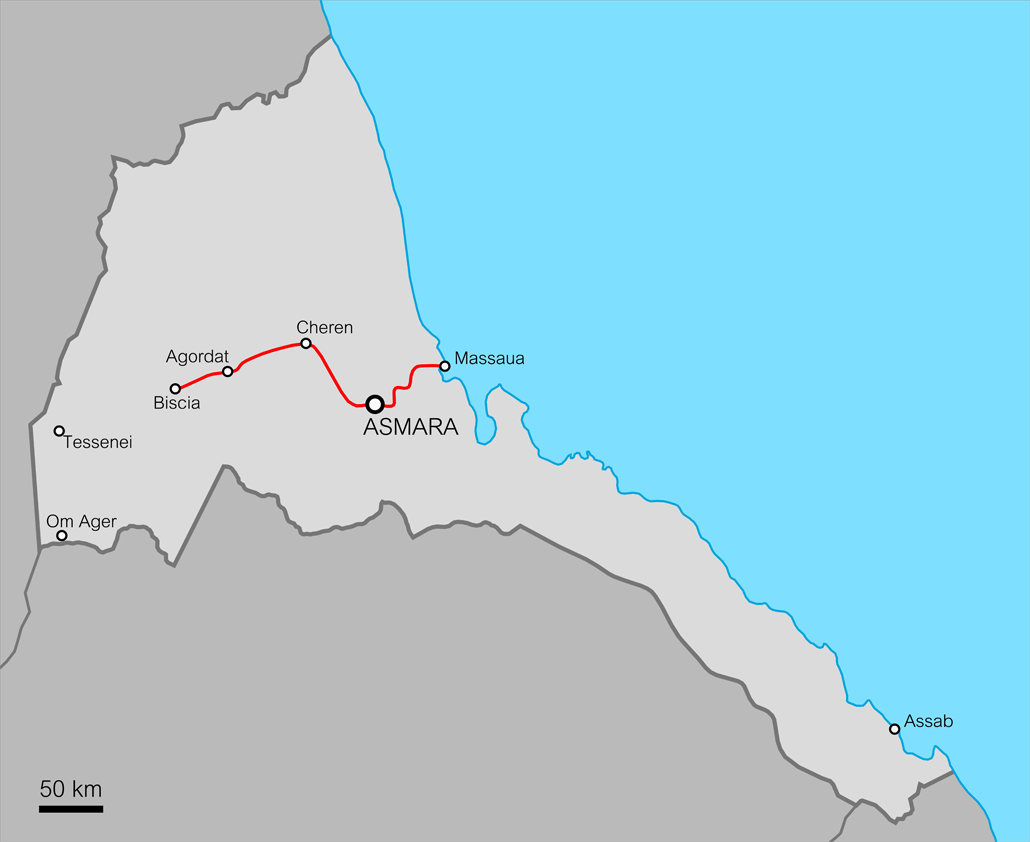
Eritrean Railways at their greatest extension before WWII

This article is a list of the railway stations in Eritrea.
The Eritrean Railway originally ran from Massawa, a port on the Red Sea, via the capital Asmara to Agordat. The line can be divided into three sections (Massawa-Asmara; Asmara-Keren; Keren-Agordat). Additionally there was until WW2 a potash line, that was used also for civilian service.

== Massawa to Asmara ==
(Eritrea) The route was built between 1887 and 1910 by the Italians, who made the two main stations (Asmara and Massawa) with typical structures of railway stations in small Italian cities.

As of 2008, this is the only section open.

Name	Image	Distance	Altitude	Coordinates
Massawa		0.0 km (0.0 mi)	3 m (10 ft)	15.606546°N 39.466163°E
Campo di Marte		2.8 km (1.7 mi)	9 m (30 ft)	15.6144297°N 39.4450754°E
Otumlo		4.6 km (2.9 mi)	11 m (36 ft)	15.6233339°N 39.4328311°E
Moncullo		7.7 km (4.8 mi)	30 m (98 ft)	15.61041°N 39.408839°E
Dogali		19.6 km (12.2 mi)	100 m (328 ft)	15.5983434°N 39.3071535°E
Mai Atal		29.4 km (18.3 mi)	181 m (594 ft)	15.5682675°N 39.2429334°E
Damas		45.0 km (28.0 mi)	416 m (1,365 ft)	15.476202°N 39.207952°E
Baresa		57.1 km (35.5 mi)	600 m (1,969 ft)	15.401421°N 39.184778°E
Ghinda		69.4 km (43.1 mi)	888 m (2,913 ft)	15.438634°N 39.101447°E
Embatkalla		81.1 km (50.4 mi)	1,274 m (4,180 ft)	15.400438°N 39.07397°E
Nefasit		93.0 km (57.8 mi)	1,672 m (5,486 ft)	15.335212°N 39.063274°E
Arbaroba		104.9 km (65.2 mi)	2,064 m (6,772 ft)	15.346758°N 39.007419°E
Asmara		117.6 km (73.1 mi)	2,342 m (7,684 ft)	15.338936°N 38.949323°E

== Asmara to Keren ==
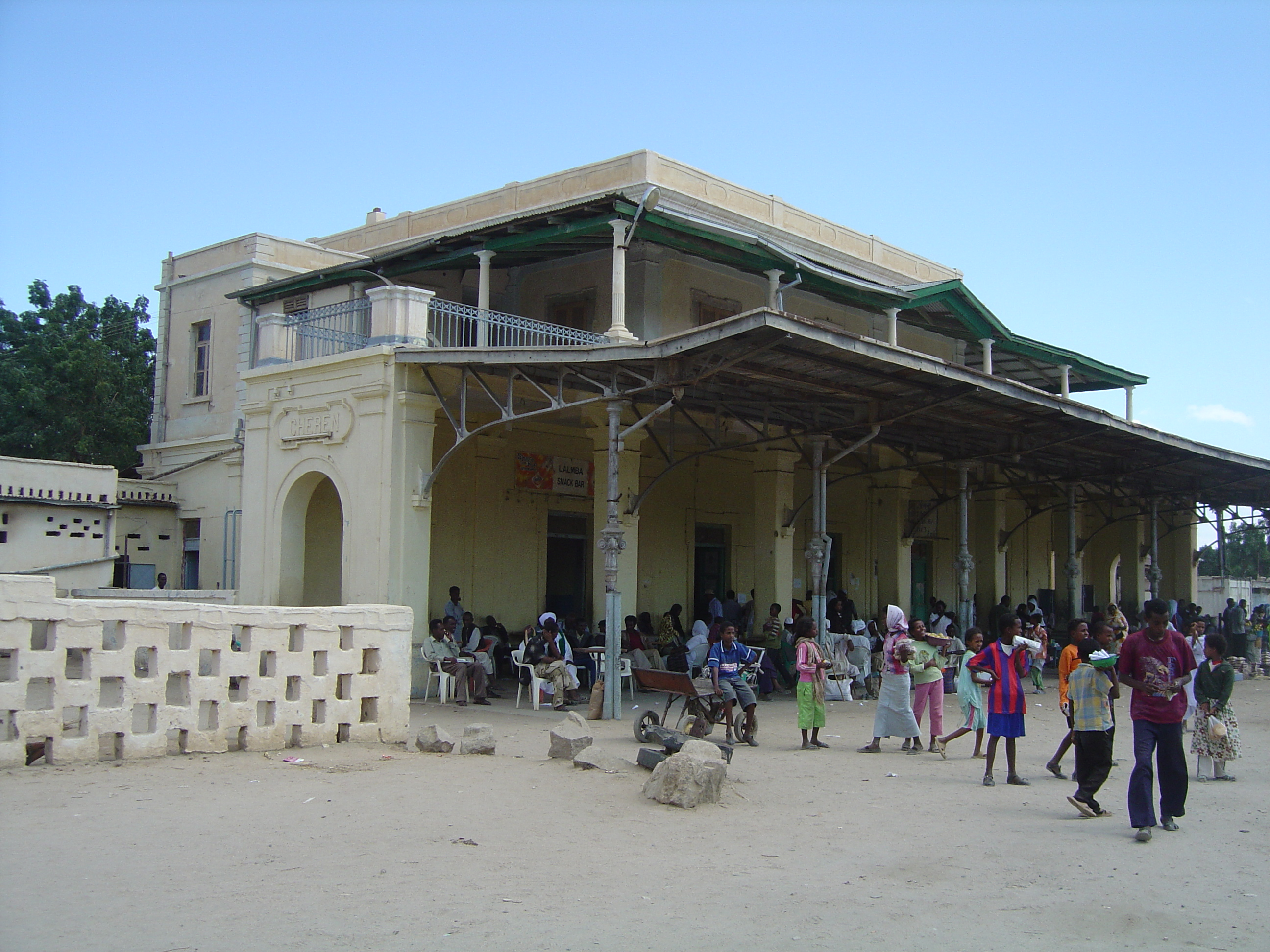
Keren railway station – now used as a bus station and market

This section (with the stations) was built between 1911 and 1923. The railway generally followed the Anseba River and one of its tributaries through the mountains between Zazzega and Halib Mentel.

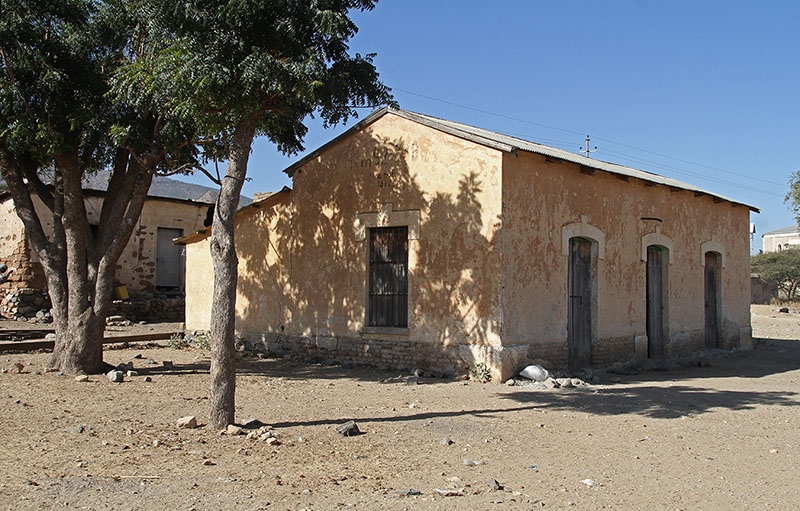
Halib Mentel Station

Name	Distance	Altitude	Coordinates
Tzada Cristian	127.2 km (79.0 mi)	2,292 m (7,520 ft)	15.337200°N 38.848235°E
Zazzega	136.8 km (85.0 mi)	2,217 m (7,274 ft)	15.353530°N 38.808876°E
Dem Sabai	148.5 km (92.3 mi)	1,988 m (6,522 ft)	15.412373°N 38.767746°E
Andenna	156.6 km (97.3 mi)	1,907 m (6,257 ft)	15.458534°N 38.761063°E
Abrascico	164.9 km (102.5 mi)	1,783 m (5,850 ft)	15.508964°N 38.735621°E
Amba Derho	176.3 km (109.5 mi)	1,688 m (5,538 ft)	15.579392°N 38.695315°E
Furkuto	185.7 km (115.4 mi)	1,635 m (5,364 ft)	15.633484°N 38.660290°E
Elabered	195.3 km (121.4 mi)	1,468 m (4,816 ft)	15.681942°N 38.614706°E
Halib Mentel	209.9 km (130.4 mi)	1,423 m (4,669 ft)	15.745387°N 38.547237°E
Keren	221.7 km (137.8 mi)	1,390 m (4,560 ft)	15.776962°N 38.453618°E

== Keren to Agordat ==
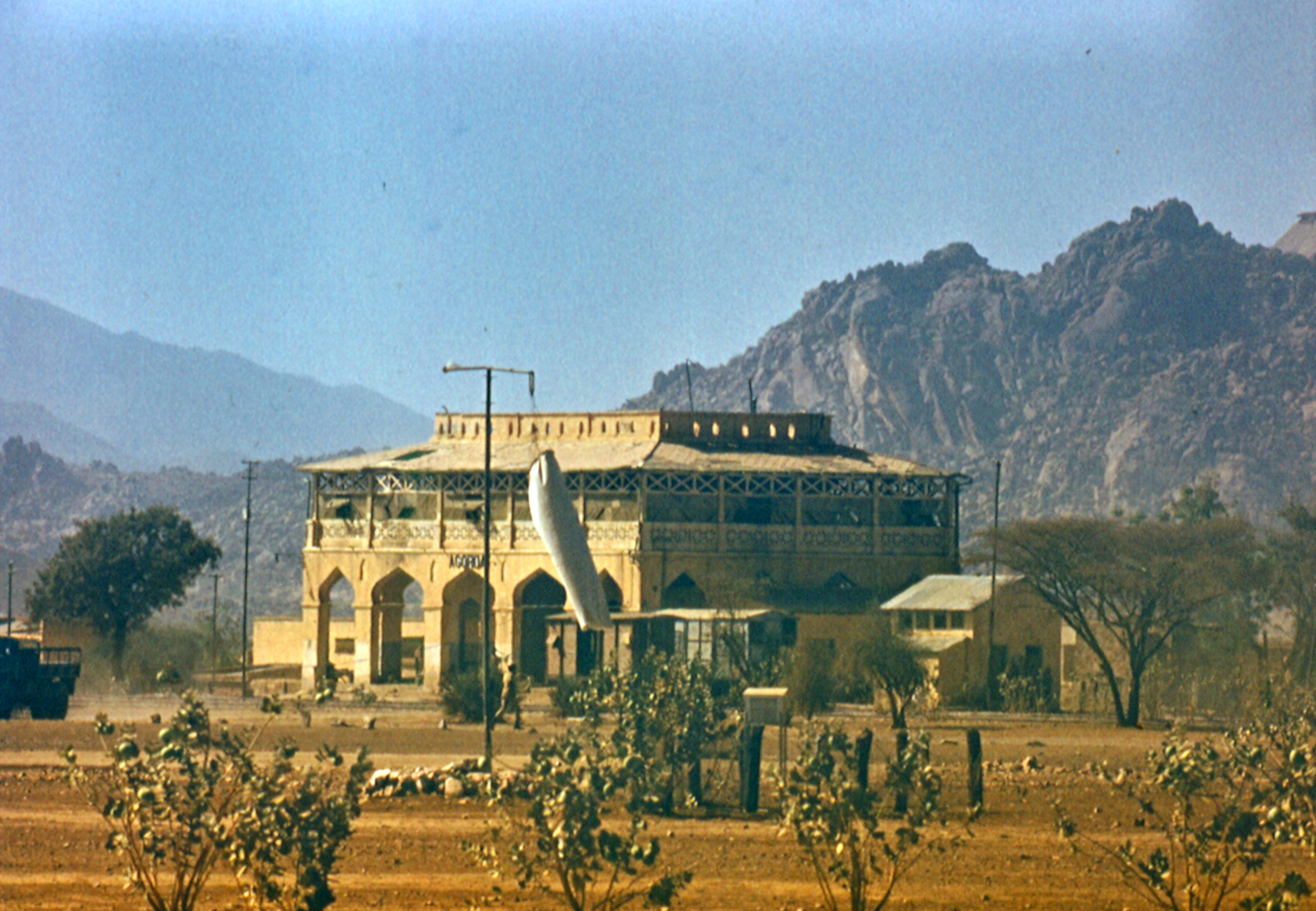
Agordat station, built in Arabesque style

This section was built between 1924 and 1929.

Name	Distance	Altitude	Coordinates
Asciadira	232.7 km (144.6 mi)	1,204 m (3,950 ft)	15.763700°N 38.390402°E
Hummed	245.7 km (152.7 mi)	935 m (3,068 ft)	15.738949°N 38.323677°E
Agat	253.3 km (157.4 mi)	864 m (2,835 ft)	
Darotai	262.5 km (163.1 mi)	795 m (2,608 ft)	
Mai Adarte	271.4 km (168.6 mi)	750 m (2,461 ft)	15.655361°N 38.133637°E
Umfutat	284.6 km (176.8 mi)	669 m (2,195 ft)	
Carobel	296.4 km (184.2 mi)	677 m (2,221 ft)	
Agordat	306.4 km (190.4 mi)	606 m (1,988 ft)	15.546063°N 37.881155°E

== Beyond Agordat ==
Beyond Agordat, the rails were laid as far as Bishia, another 31 kilometres (19 mi), with plans to extend to Ellit and Teseney, linking with the railway network in Sudan. However this section was never completed.

There would have been a break-of-gauge at the connection between Sudan and Eritrea.

Name	Distance	Altitude	Comments
Agordat	232.7 km (144.6 mi)	606 m (1,988 ft)	
Bishia	263.7 km (163.9 mi),	715 m (2,346 ft)	15.490014°N 37.546572°E
Ellit	290.7 km (180.6 mi)	735 m (2,411 ft)	km uncertain
Teseney	301.0 km (187.0 mi)	600 m (1,969 ft)	km uncertain
Kassala, Sudan	351.0 km (218.1 mi)	531 m (1,742 ft)	km uncertain; Near Eritrea-Sudan border

== Potash railway ==
A 42 kilometres (26 mi) line carrying potash was built to serve the following locations:

- Badda
- Adaito

The 600 mm (1 ft 11 5/8 in) gauge line was active from 1905: a 600-mm track gauge line was built by the Italians inside the port of Mersa Fatuma and from it into the hinterland until Kululi near the Ethiopian border. This was the main source of potash in Eritrea and had to cease operations because of the Great Depression of 1929.

== See also ==
- Transport in Eritrea
- Eritrean Railway
- Italian Eritrea
- Italian Eritreans
- Railway stations in Sudan
- Railway stations in Ethiopia
- Railway stations in Somalia
