= Baresa, Eritrea =

Baresa برسا
- Town
- Location in Eritrea
- Coordinates: 15°24′00″N 39°12′00″E
- Country: Eritrea
- Region: Northern Red Sea
- District: Ghinda

Baresa (Arabic: برسا) is a small town in the Northern Red Sea region of Eritrea. It lies between Asmara and Massawa, near Ghinda.

== Transport ==
Baresa is served by a station on the national Eritrean Railway network.

== See also ==
- Railway stations in Eritrea
