= Baresa =

Baresa may refer to:

- Baresa, a village of Northern Red Sea Region (Eritrea)
- Biaroza (in Russian Berëza), a town of Brest Voblast (Belarus)
