= Ghinda =

Ghinda قندع
- Town
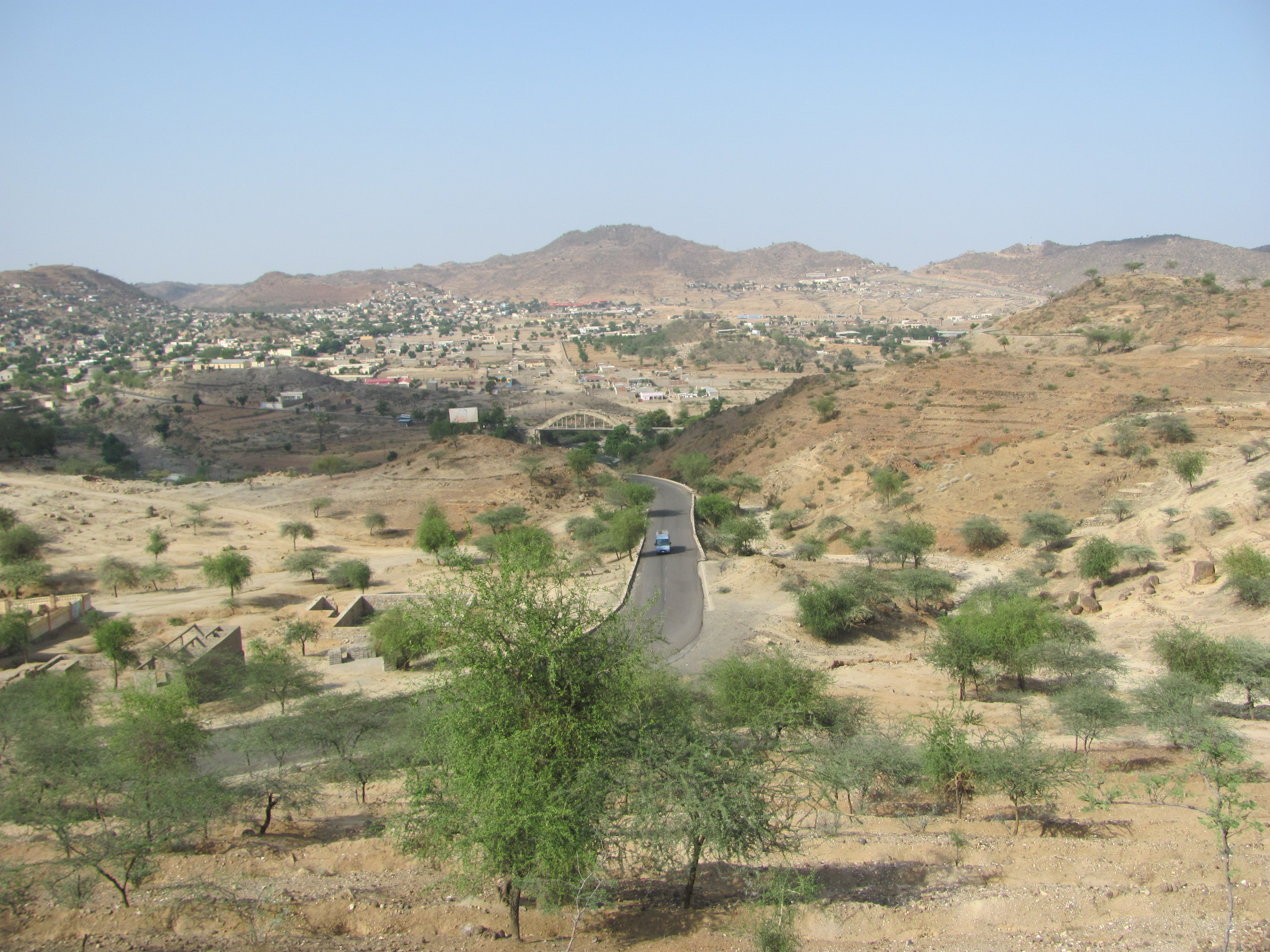
- The Ghinda horizon

- Location in Eritrea
- Coordinates: 15°27′N 39°05′E
- Country: Eritrea
- Region: Northern Red Sea
- District: Ghinda
- Elevation: 928 m (3,045 ft)
- Climate: Aw

Ghinda (Arabic: قندع) is a town in the Northern Red Sea region of Eritrea. It is situated in the Ghinda subregion, and lies between Asmara and Massawa.

== Overview ==
Ghinda is a major fruit and vegetable growing area and a centre for Tigre people, Tigrinya people, and Saho people. It lies near the springs of Sabarguma. The citrus plantations were originally planted by Carlo Cavanna, an Italian from Centenaro who directed the construction of the Eritrean Railway, the first railway in Italian Eritrea.

== Climate ==
Climate data for Ghinda
Month	Jan	Feb	Mar	Apr	May	Jun	Jul	Aug	Sep	Oct	Nov	Dec	Year
Mean daily maximum °C (°F)	28.6 (83.5)	29.4 (84.9)	31.0 (87.8)	32.3 (90.1)	33.6 (92.5)	34.5 (94.1)	31.7 (89.1)	31.1 (88.0)	32.5 (90.5)	31.3 (88.3)	29.5 (85.1)	28.4 (83.1)	31.2 (88.1)
Mean daily minimum °C (°F)	14.5 (58.1)	15.1 (59.2)	16.3 (61.3)	17.7 (63.9)	19.0 (66.2)	20.1 (68.2)	19.7 (67.5)	20.6 (69.1)	19.2 (66.6)	17.1 (62.8)	15.2 (59.4)	14.8 (58.6)	17.4 (63.4)
Average precipitation mm (inches)	99 (3.9)	113 (4.4)	72 (2.8)	48 (1.9)	26 (1.0)	10 (0.4)	71 (2.8)	58 (2.3)	23 (0.9)	46 (1.8)	52 (2.0)	94 (3.7)	712 (27.9)
Source: Climate Data

== See also ==
- Railway stations in Eritrea
