= Carobel =

Carobel كروبل
- Town
- Location in Eritrea.
- Coordinates: 15°34′00″N 37°57′00″E
- Country: Eritrea
- Region: Anseba
- Time zone: UTC+3 (EAT)

Carobel (Arabic: كروبل) is a small town in the northern Anseba Region of Eritrea. It was served by a station on the Eritrean Railway. However, the line closed in the 1970s.

== See also ==
- Railway stations in Eritrea

== Bibliography ==
- Carobel, Eritrea
