= Mentel =

Mentel is a surname. Notable people with the surname include:

- Bibian Mentel (1972–2021), Dutch snowboarder
- Miroslav Mentel (born 1962), Slovak footballer and coach

== See also ==
- Halib Mentel, village in Eritrea
- Mendel (name)
