= Asmara-Massawa Cableway =

Aerial lift in Asmara, Eritrea

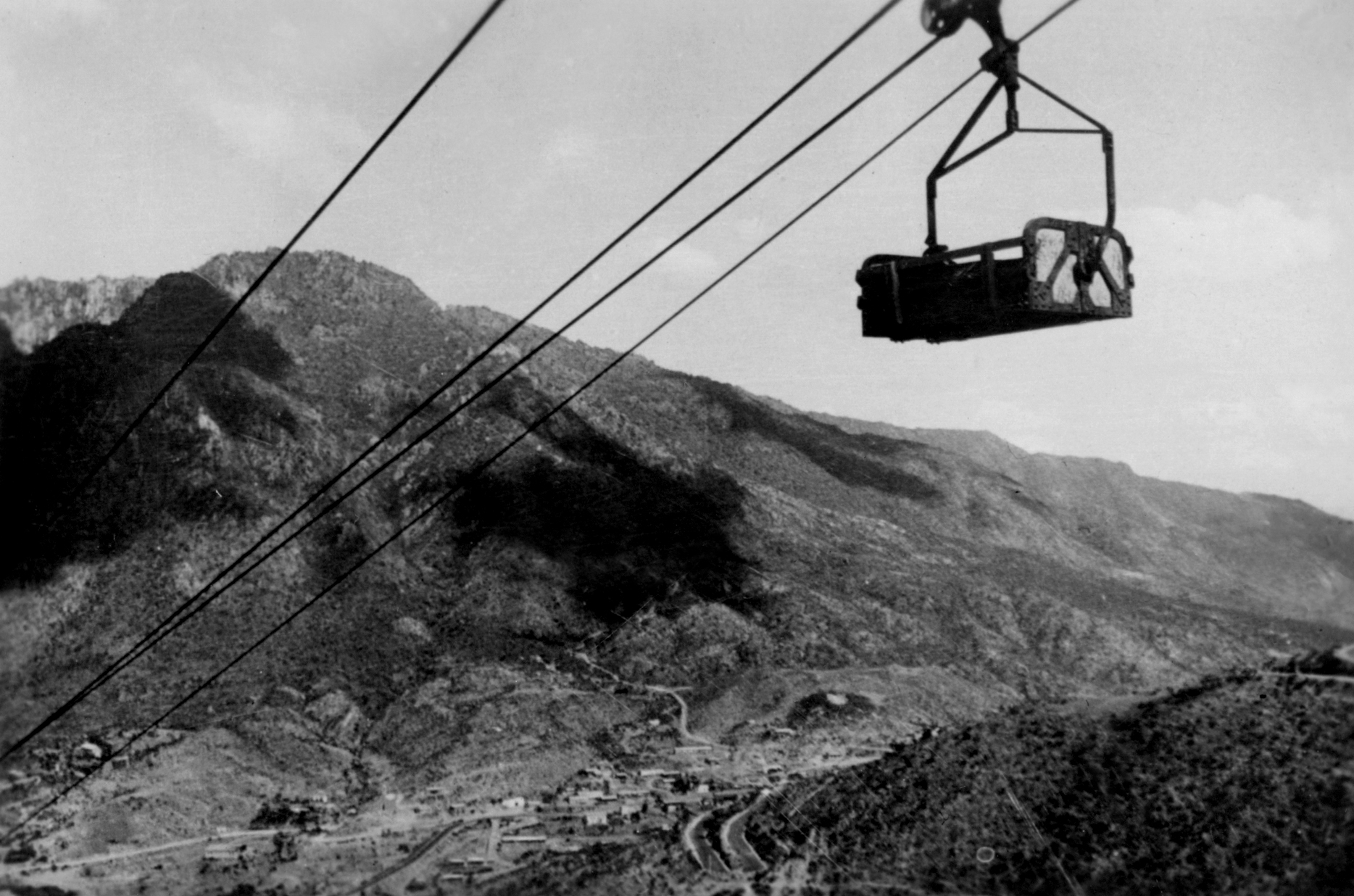
The cableway near Asmara

The Asmara-Massawa Cableway was a cableway (or "ropeway") built in Italian Eritrea before World War II. The Eritrean Ropeway, completed in 1937, ran 71.8 km from the south end of Asmara to the city-port of Massawa.

== History ==
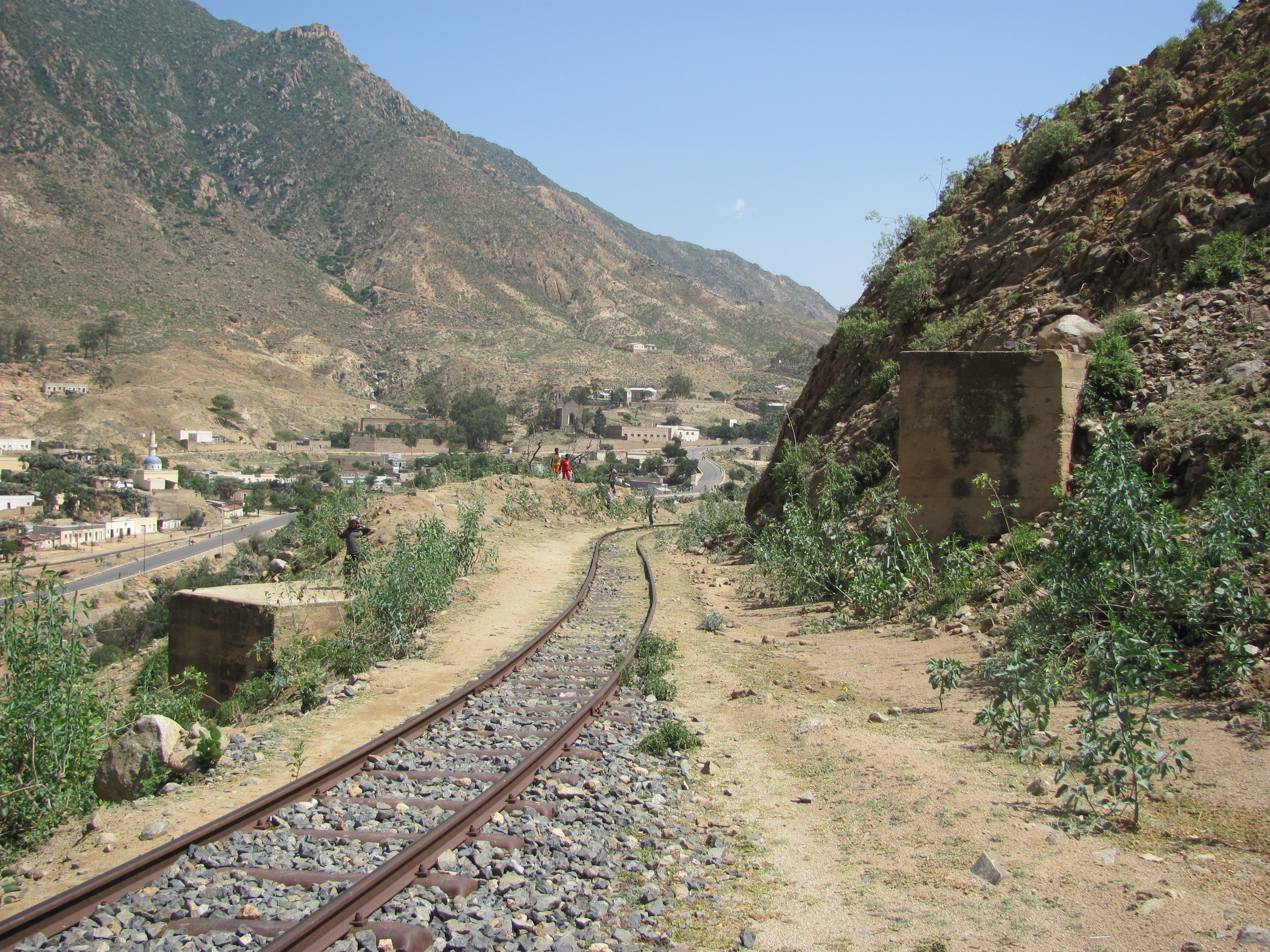
Foundation of pylon of former cableway Massawa-Asmara, above Nefasit

The cableway was built by the Italian engineering firm Ceretti and Tanfani S.A. in Eritrea. It connected the port of Massawa with the city of Italian Asmara and ran a distance of nearly 72 kilometres. It also moved food, supplies and war materials for the Imperial Italian Army, which had also conquered Ethiopia in 1936. In August 1936 the first section of 26.6 km was opened from Ghinda to Godaif, a suburb of Asmara.

The Eritrean Ropeway, completed in 1937, ran 71.8 km from near Massawa to the south end of Asmara. This was the longest cableway ever. It covered a distance which was over twice the current one longest in the world which has less than 35 km in Lapland. It was rendered non-operational by the British removing the engines shortly after their victory at Keren [1941] in World War II. The assemblage stood for over twenty years and was still in very good condition in 1962. Ralph Reinhold

With the capacity to transport 30 tons of material every hour in each direction from the seaport of Massawa to 2326 meters above sea level in Asmara, the cableway was the longest of its kind in the world when inaugurated in 1937. The bearing cables were in almost 30 sections, were powered by diesel engines, and carried freight in 1540 small transport gondolas. In southern Eritrea there was another small ropeway.

The Massawa-Asmara cableway is now recognized as the longest three-cable aerial line ever constructed. For a brief overview of the gigantic work, it is enough to outline the following facts: 1) The mechanical components reach a weight of a little less than a thousand tons; the cables weigh the same; and the aggregate weight of the structural steel work amounts to almost two thousand tons; 2) The walls and foundations amount to 15,000 cubic meters of concrete; 3) The earthworks and the pits for the foundations required the excavation of 45,000 cubic meters, of which about 35,000 were solid rock. Il Chichingiolo

During their eleven-year military administration (1941-1952) of the former Italian colony, the British dismantled the installations. They removed the diesel engines, the steel cables, and other equipment as war reparations. Iron towers that remained were scrapped in the 1980s.

== See also ==
- Eritrean Railway
- Italian Eritrea
