= Bishia =

Town in Eritrea

Coordinates: 15°29′02″N 37°32′41″E

Bishia (Arabic: نشيا, Italian: Biscia) is a small locality in western Eritrea.

== Transport ==
It was the original terminus of the Eritrean Railway from Asmara, though the line did briefly extend through to Sudan. However the railway no longer extends here, having been damaged during the Eritrean-Ethiopian War. The railway has been rehabilitated between the Red Sea and Asmara but has not been rebuilt up to Bishia.

== See also ==
- Railway stations in Eritrea
