= Colluli mine =

Potash mine in Eritrea

Location
- Location: Eritrea

Production
- Products: Potash

The Colluli mine is a large potash mine located in southern Eritrea. Colluli represents one of the largest potash reserves in Eritrea having estimated reserves of 1.08 billion tonnes of ore grading 18% potassium chloride metal.

The mine formerly hosted a railway connection to Assab, which has since been abandoned.
