= Halib Mentel =

Halib Mentel هاليب مينتل Habin Mentel Halibmentel, Halimentel
- Halibmentel
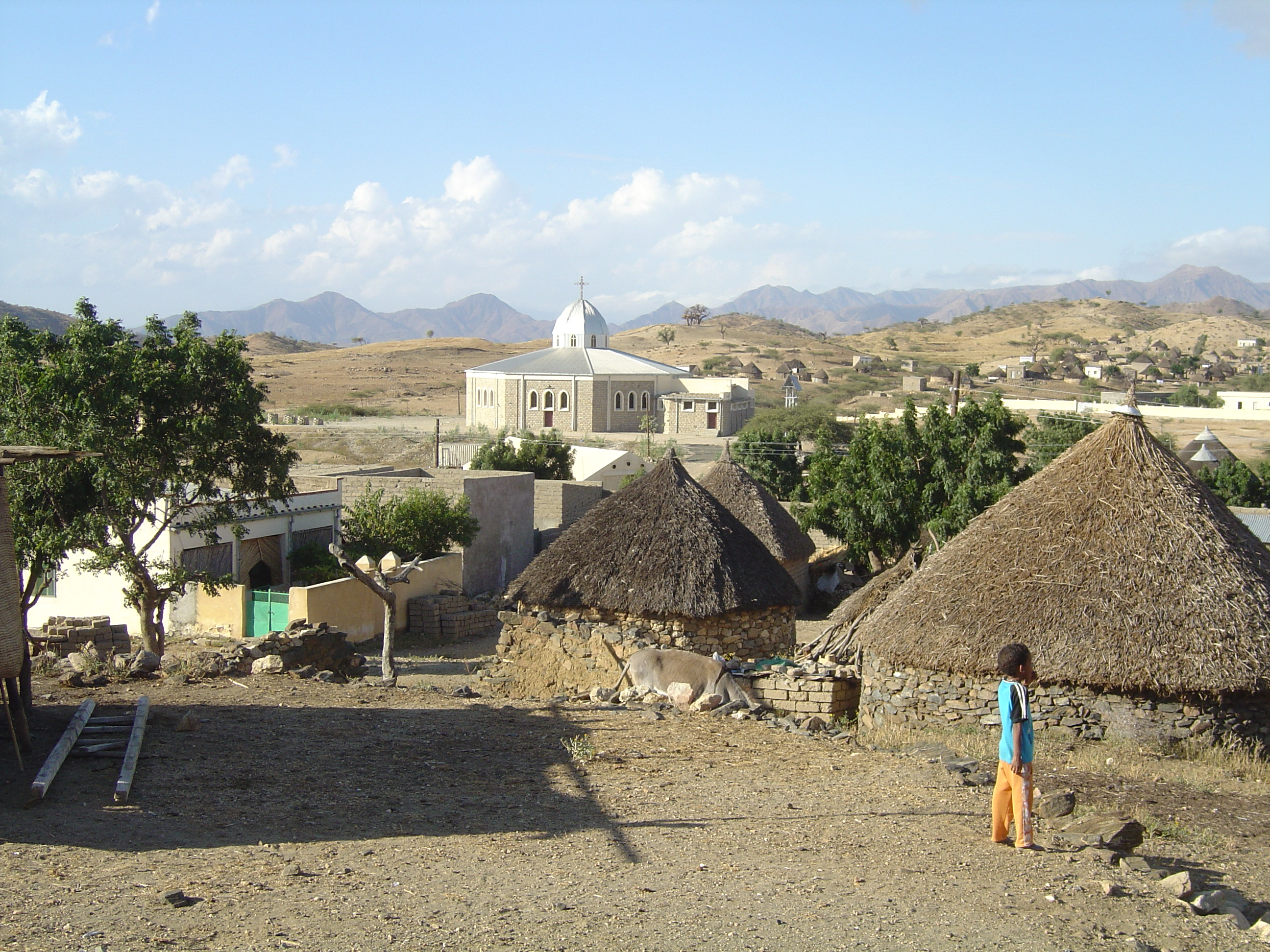
- Halib Mentel, showing Tukuls and church

- Location in Eritrea
- Coordinates: 15°44′38″N 38°33′4″E
- Country: Eritrea
- Region: Anseba

Halib Mentel (Arabic: هاليب مينتل), also referred to as Halibmentel or Halimentel, is a village in Eritrea. It is approximately 11 kilometres (6.8 mi) east of the city of Keren.

== Overview ==
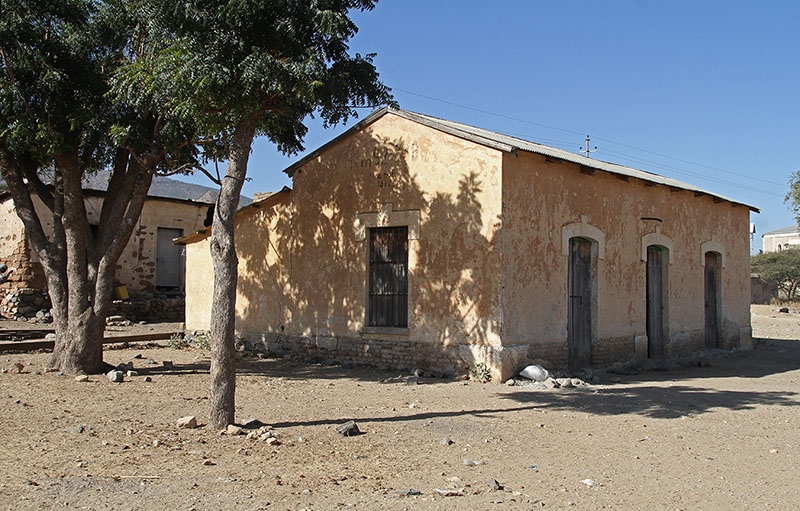
The former station at Halib Mentel

Halib Mentel mostly consists of round huts, known as tukuls, and has a large Catholic church. The village is on the trackbed of the Eritrean Railway, between Asmara and Keren. The railway closed in 1975, though there are plans to re-open it.
