= Massawa =

Port city in Eritrea

Massawa Arabic: مصوع Məṣṣəwaʿ (ማሳዋ) Mitsiwa
- City
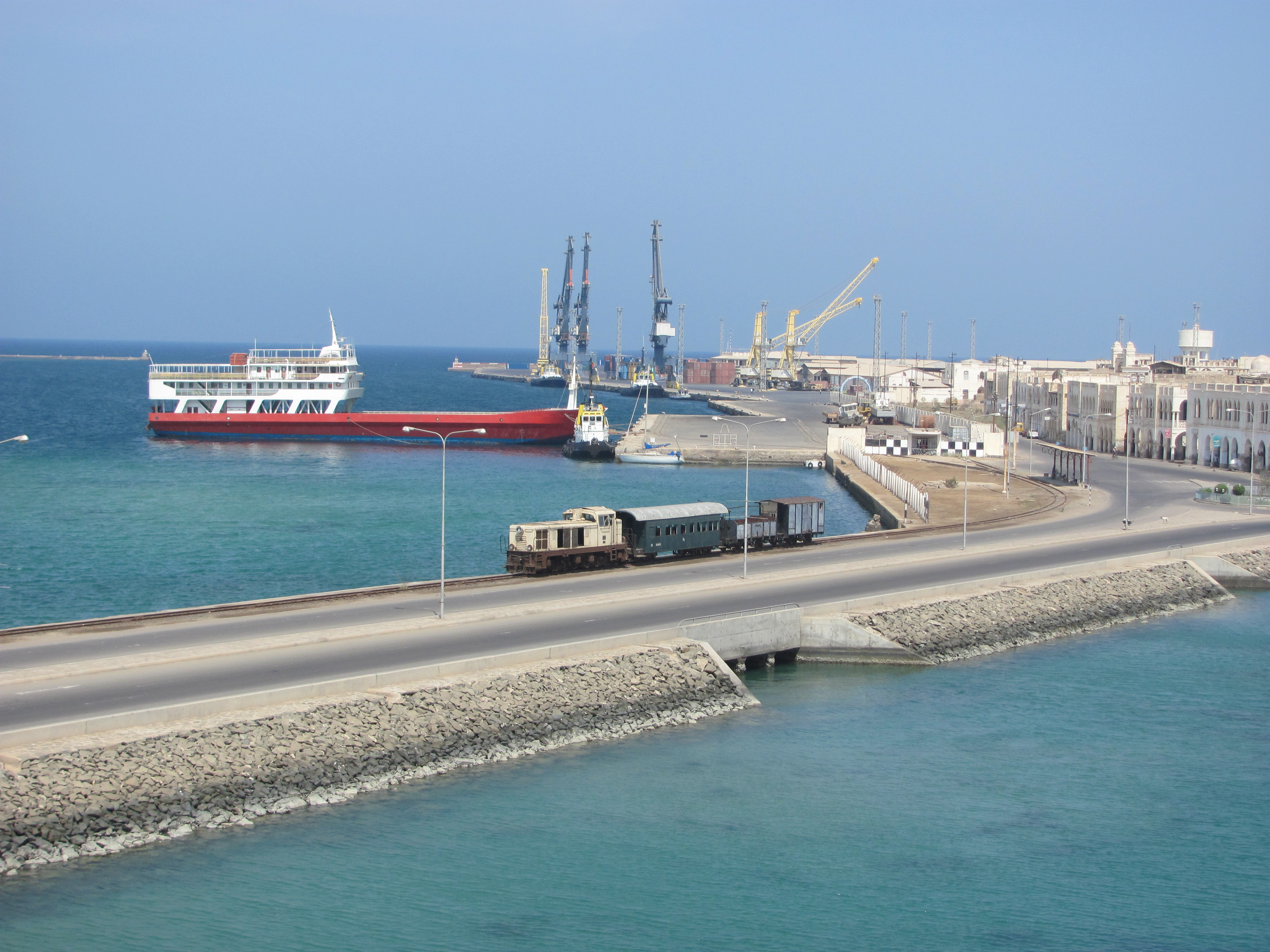
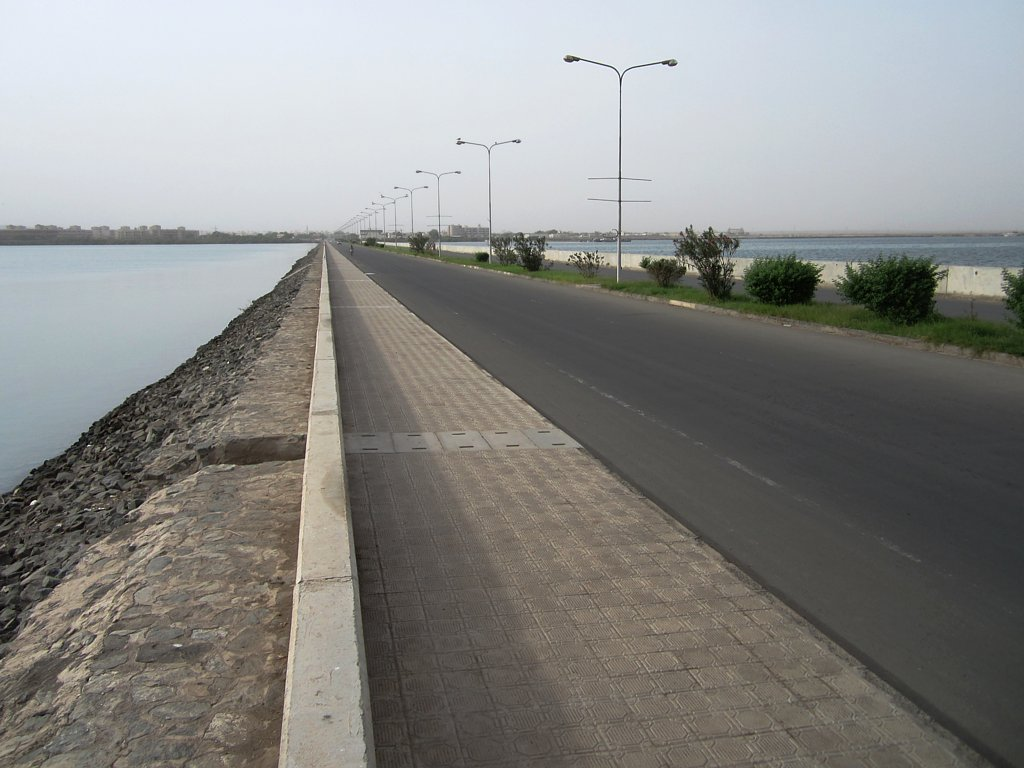
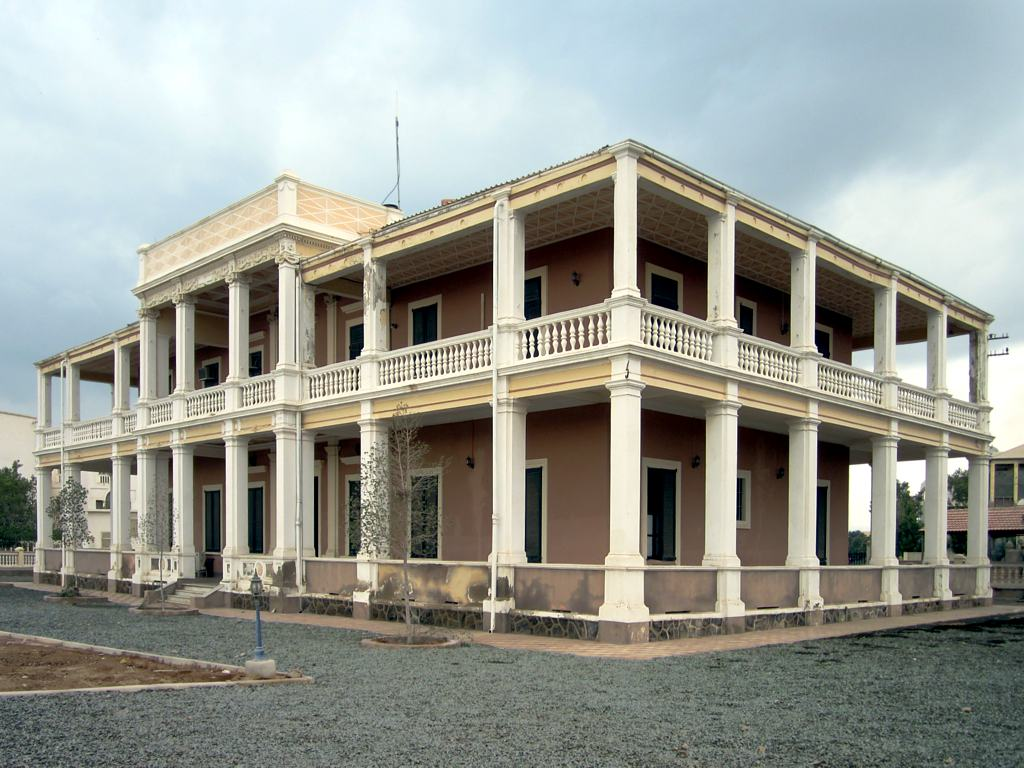
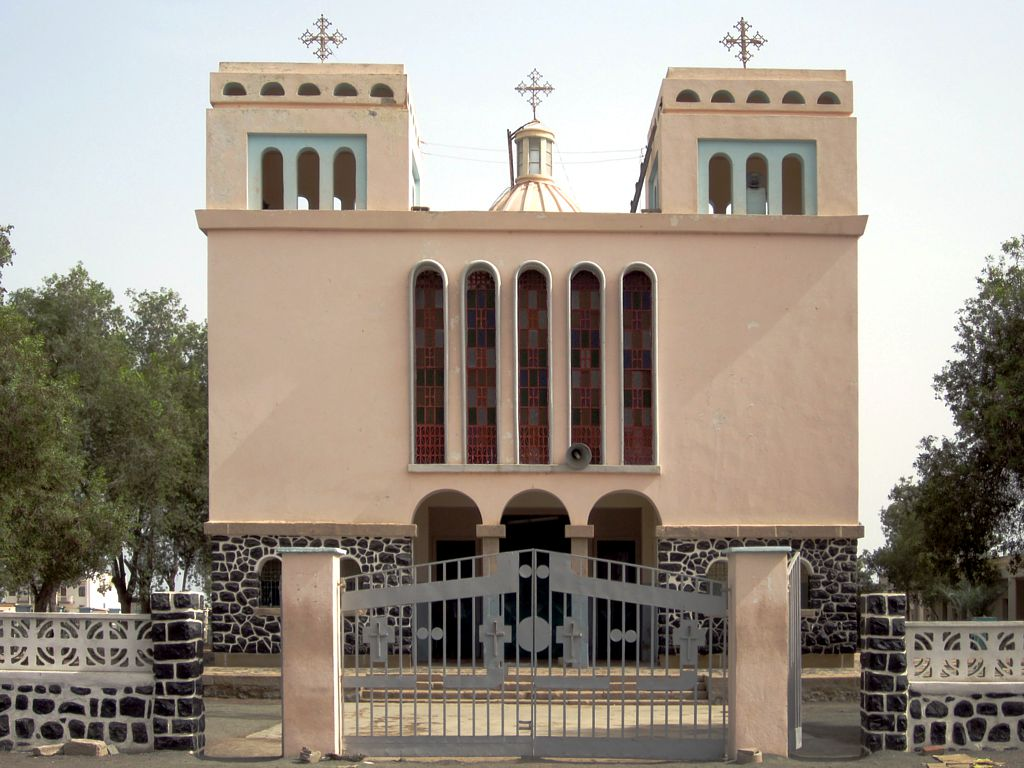
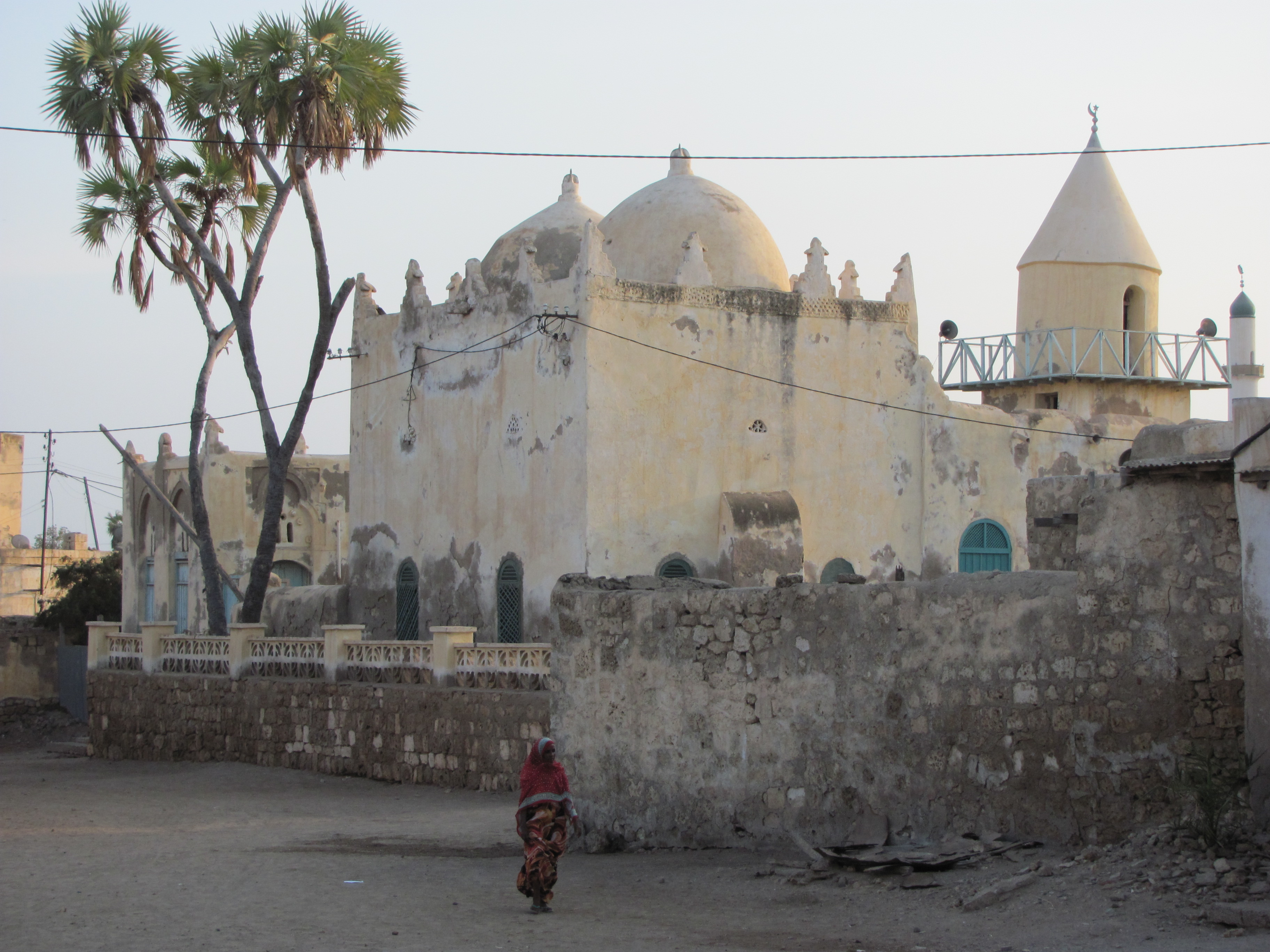
- Clockwise from top: Port of Massawa, Administration building, Shiekh Hamaal Mosque, St Mariam Orthodox Cathedral Church, Massawa Island causeway
- Motto: Tigrinya: ሉል ቀይሕ ባሕሪ Pearl of the Red Sea
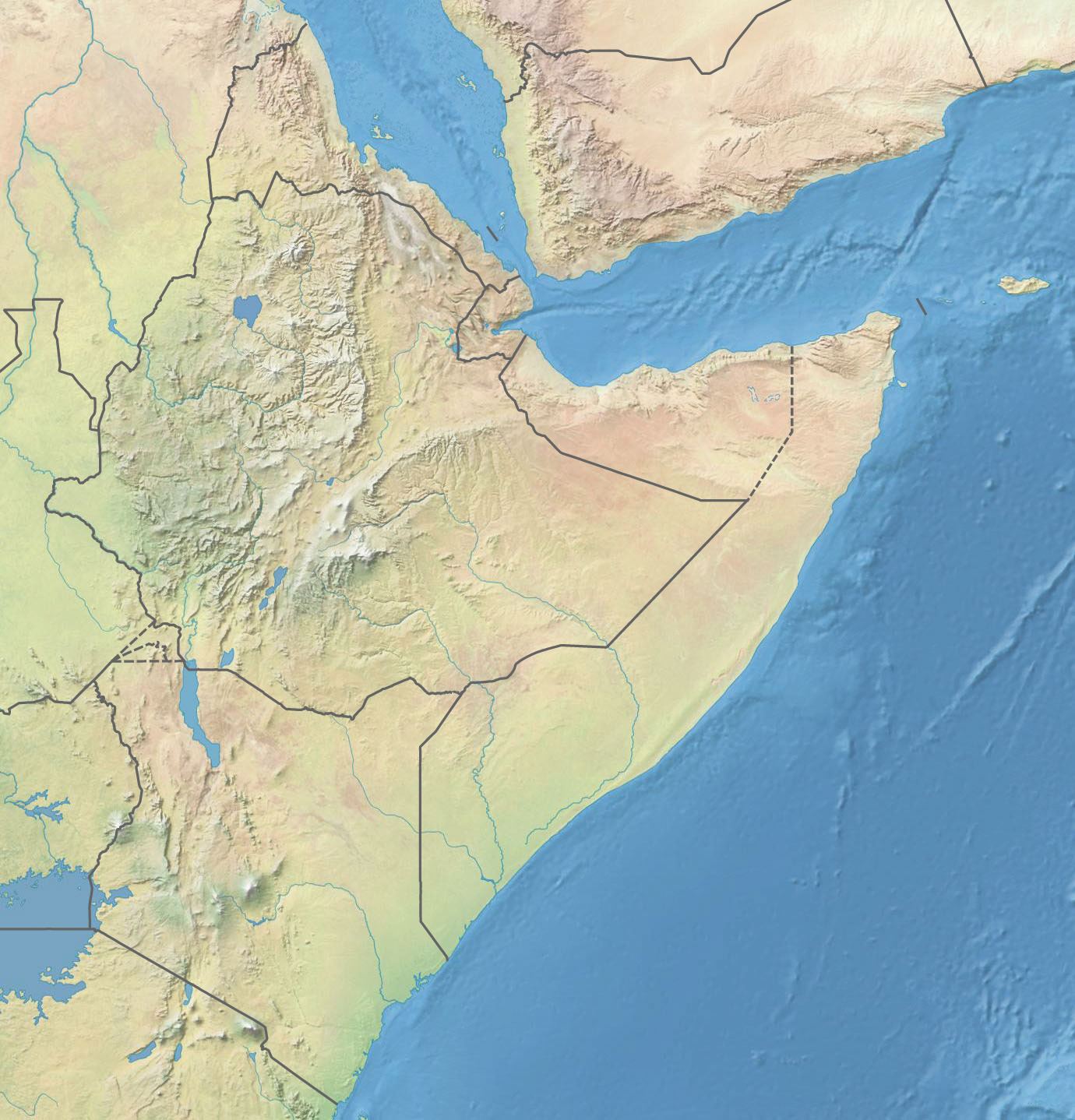
- Location within Eritrea Location within the Horn of Africa Location within Africa
- Coordinates: 15°36′35″N 39°27′00″E
- Country: Eritrea
- Region: Semienawi Keyih Bahri Region
- District: Massawa

Government
  - Administrator: Kidane Weldesilase

Area
  - Total: 477 km^{2} (184 sq mi)
- Elevation: 6 m (20 ft)

Population (2012)
  - Total: 53,090
  - Density: 111/km^{2} (288/sq mi)
- Time zone: UTC+3 (EAT)
- Area code: +291 4
- Climate: BWh

Massawa or Mitsiwa (/məˈsɑːwə/ mə-SAH-wə) (Note: Tigrinya: ምጽዋዕ, romanized: Məṣṣəwaʿ; Tigre: ባጸዕ, Baṣäʿ or ባድዕ, Badəʿ; Ge'ez: ምጽዋ; Arabic: مَصَّوَع; Italian: Massaua; Portuguese: Maçuá) is a port city in the Northern Red Sea region of Eritrea, located on the Red Sea at the northern end of the Gulf of Zula beside the Dahlak Archipelago. It has been a historically important port for many centuries. Massawa has been ruled or occupied by a succession of polities during its history, including the Dahlak Sultanate, the Ottoman Empire, the Khedivate of Egypt and the Kingdom of Italy.

Massawa was the capital of the Italian Colony of Eritrea until the seat of the colonial government was moved to Asmara in 1897.

Massawa has an average temperature of nearly 30 °C (86.0 °F), which is one of the highest experienced in the world, and is "one of the hottest marine coastal areas in the world."

== History ==
Massawa, Northern Red Sea, Eritrea,, plans received from Capt. Bibb, 1763, M. Anville 1784,

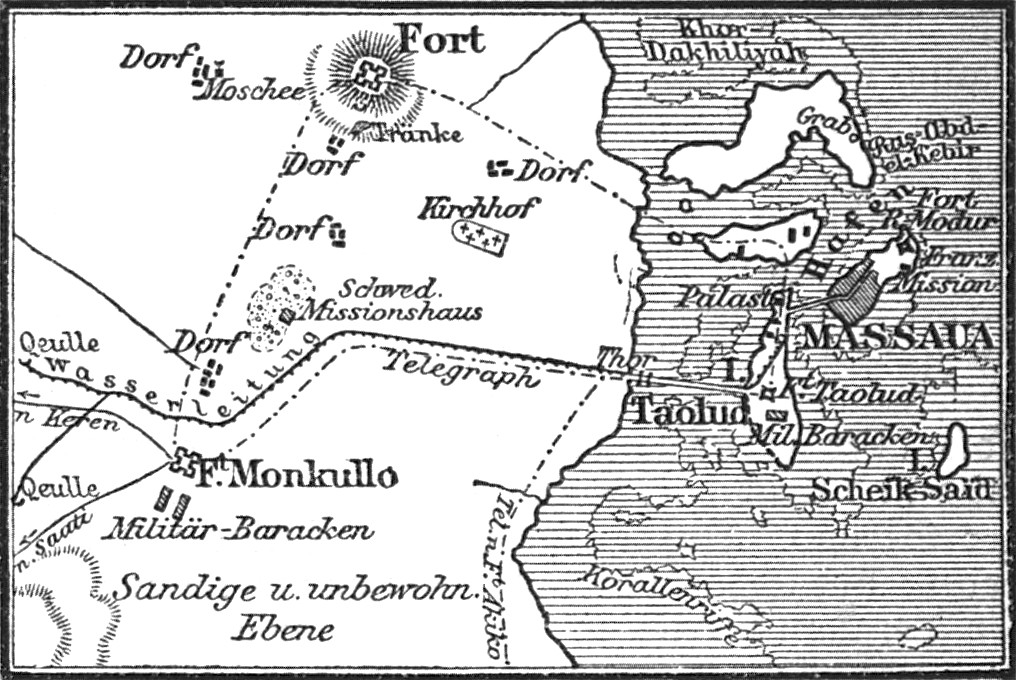
Historical map of Massawa.

The historical Massawa lies on the islands Basé (with the historical centre) and Taulud (or Tawalut, Tawlud), connected with each other and with the coast by dams. Massawa seems to have emerged as a port sometime between the 8th and 10th centuries, after the decline of the nearby port of Adulis about 50 kilometres (31 mi) to the south. Richard Pankhurst identifies Massawa as being the site of the ancient Arab port of Badi which flourished from 600–1100 AD.

The nearby Dahlak Archipelago was dominated by Arabs, while the coast of Massawa was then controlled by Beja tribes. With the rise of the Sultanate of Dahlak in the 11th century, Massawa became the main link between the Muslim-dominated Red Sea coast and the Christian highlands. Local tradition speaks of the Seyuma Bahr ("Prefect of the Sea"), an independent ruler of Dahlak and the coastal regions, who controlled the trade routes between Ethiopia and the Arabian Peninsula.

From the 14th century onward, Massawa attracted increased interest from Christian highland rulers. During periods of political consolidation, Ethiopian rulers expanded their influence up to Massawa, competing with the ruler of Dahlak. War songs of Emperor Yeshaq I mention campaigns to Massawa, where he subdued the deputy of Dahlak. Emperor Zara Yaqob, after consolidating control over the nearby highlands, appears to have reached Massawa in the mid-15th century. He fortified the Gerer peninsula, opposite of the island city, according to a chronicle of Addi Néýammén. It is also reported that both Massawa and Dahlak were pillaged by the Abyssinians in 1464/65, during which "the qadi" was killed (likely a powerful chief official of Massawa).

Massawa only irregularly paid tribute to the Abyssinian rulers of the adjacent highlands, such as the Bahr Negash or the governor of the coastal provinces, but it remained connected to the ruler of Dahlak, who himself was a vassal of the Sultan in Aden.

=== Portuguese influence ===
In the struggle for domination of the Red Sea the Portuguese succeeded in establishing a foothold in Massawa (Maçua) and Arkiko in 1513 by Diogo Lopes de Albergaria, a port by which they entered the allied territory of Ethiopia in the fight against the Ottomans. King Manuel I first gave orders for the construction of a fortress that was never built. However, during Portuguese presence, it was lifted as well as the existing cisterns and wells for the Portuguese Navy watery. It was drawn by D. João de Castro in 1541 in his "Roteiro do Mar Roxo" in their route to attack El Tor and Suez. The captain of the Arkiko was the Portuguese Gonçalo Ferreira, second port on the coast that guaranteed the presence and maintenance of the Portuguese fleets, whenever the port of Massawa was threatened by the Turkish presence. In 1541 the Adalites ambushed the Portuguese at the Battle of Massawa.

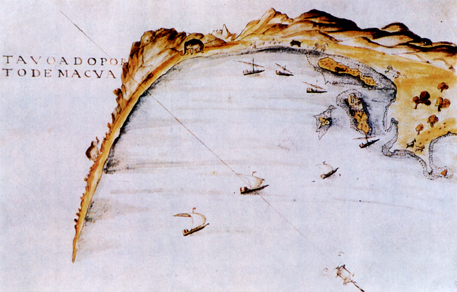
Drawing by D. João Castro, Massawa port in 1541, from his Roteiro do Mar Roxo.

=== Ottoman rule ===
Massawa rose to prominence when it was captured by the Ottoman Empire in 1557. The Ottomans tried to make it the capital of Habesh Eyalet. Under Özdemir Pasha, Ottoman troops then attempted to conquer the rest of Eritrea. Due to resistance as well as sudden and unexpected demands for more, the Ottomans did not conquer the rest of Eritrea. The Ottoman authorities then tried to place the city and its immediate hinterlands under the control of one of the aristocrats of the Balaw people, whom they wanted to appoint "Naib of Massawa" and almost made answerable to the Ottoman governor at Suakin. In the city's administration, the local qadi of the sharia court occupied a powerful position in the region, as documented starting from the 16th century to the 19th century his jurisdiction extended over a wide areas from the Habab in the north to the northern Afar coast. Ottoman interest in the city was revived in the early 19th century, when in 1809 a Turkish governor was appointed, and in 1813–23 an Egyptian one. From then on Ottoman governors were appointed regularly, and the naibs lost a part of their influence.

Due to Massawa being engulfed into the sphere of influence of the Ottomans, it had attracted many immigrants from places like Tihamah, Hadhramaut, Egypt, Turkey, the Indian subcontinent and the Arabian Peninsula with many prominent Eritrean families from Massawa tracing their lineage back to these places. Some of these families include the Afendi and Kekia families, traditionally associated with Turkish origins; the Ba’Alawi families, including Al-Safi, Al-Masawa, and Al-Hayouti (Al-Hibshi); and other Hadhrami families, including Ba’Eissa, Al-Amoudi, Ba Tuq, and Ba Khashab. Families associated with Hodeidah include Al-Nahari, Al-Ahdal (Abusharayn), and Al-Faqeeh. The Sayyid Ramadan family is associated with Jazan, while the Hindi family traces its ancestry to the Indian subcontinent. Many of these families have mixed ancestry as a result of generations of intermarriage with the local Tigre and Saho populations.

In June 1855, Emperor Tewodros II informed the British Consul, Walter Plowden, of his intention to occupy Tigray and make himself master of "the tribes along the coast", he also informed Frederick Bruce that he was determined to seize the port because it was being used by the Turks as "a deposit for kidnapped Christian children" who were being exported as slaves. Both Bruce and Plowden were sympathetic to the Emperor, but the Foreign Office, who considered the Ottomans to be a useful British ally, refused to support the proposed Ethiopian annexation.

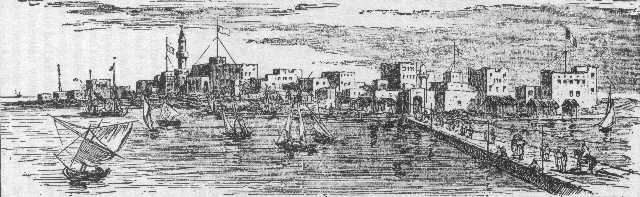
Massawa in the 19th century

In May 1865, Massawa, and later much of the Northeast African coast of the Red Sea, came under the rule of the Khedive of Egypt with Ottoman consent. The Egyptians originally had a poor opinion of Massawa. Many of the buildings were in a poor state of repair and the Egyptian troops were forced to stay in tents. Sanitary conditions were likewise poor and cholera was endemic. Such considerations caused the Egyptians to contemplate abandonment of the port in favour of nearby Zula. However, the Egyptian governor, Werner Munzinger, was determined to improve the conditions of the port and began a programme of reconstruction. Work began in March 1872 when a new government building and customs house was constructed, and by June a school and a hospital was also established by the Egyptians. Causeways were also constructed to connect the islands and the coast.

Egyptian control of Massawa was threatened following the defeat at the Battle of Gura. After the Egyptian-Ethiopian War, Emperor Yohannes IV reportedly demanded that the Egyptians should cede both Zula and Arkiko and pay Ethiopia two million pounds in reparations or, failing this sum, grant him the port of Massawa. The Egyptians refused these demands and Yohannes ordered Ras Alula with 30,000 men to advanced on the port. The population was said to have been "much alarmed" at the Ethiopian show of force, however Alula soon returned to the highlands and the Egyptian control of the coastline remained unbroken.

=== Italian colonization ===
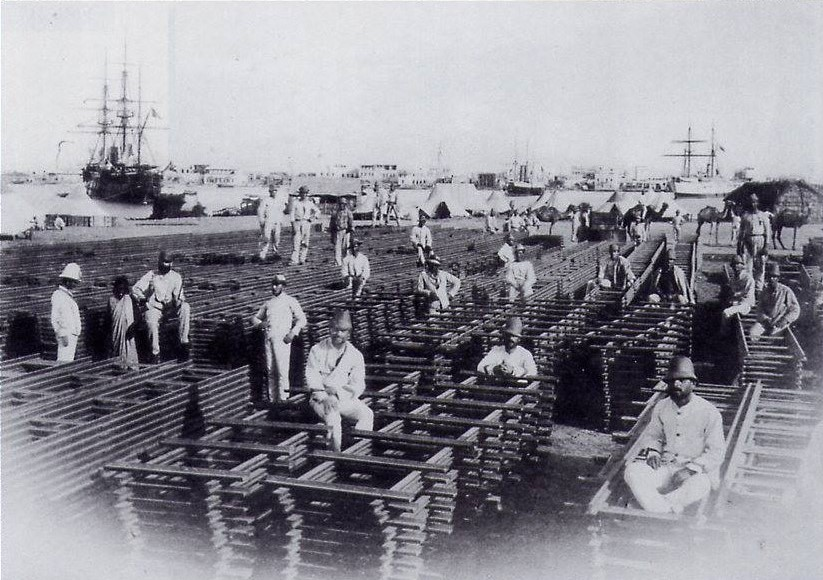
Italian soldiers of the Ferrovieri Engineer Regiment during the construction of the rails to connect Massawa to Saati, 1886.

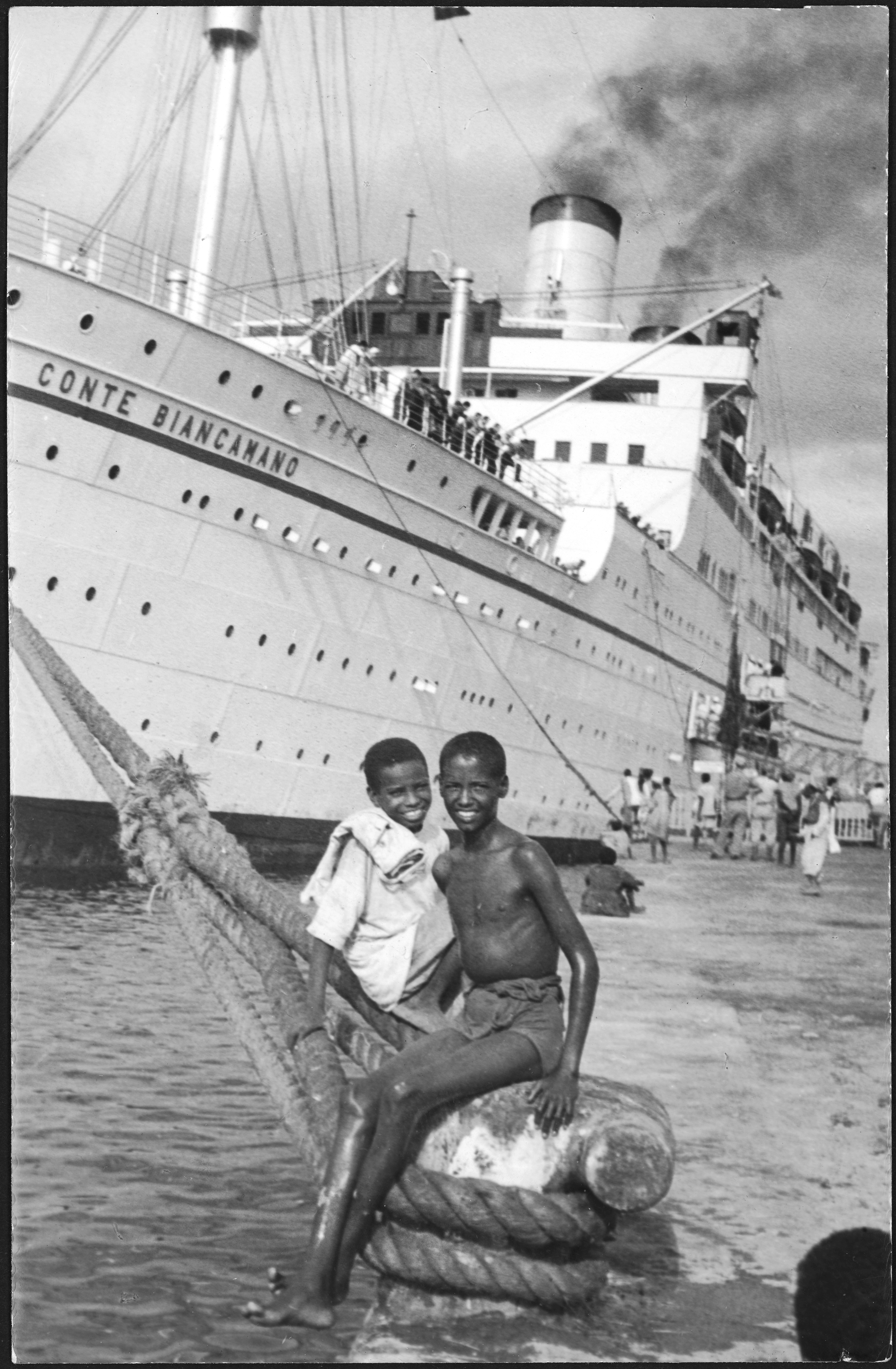
Two Eritrean boys in front of the Italian ocean liner SS Conte Biancamano before 1941

The British, feeling that the Egyptians were in no position to hold the port, and being unwilling to occupy it themselves or see it fall into the hands of the French, concurred in its seizure by the Italians in February 1885. In 1885–1897, Massawa (in the Italian spelling: 'Massaua') served as the capital of the region, before Governor Ferdinando Martini moved his administration to Asmara. However, the Italians' disastrous defeat at Adwa ended their hopes of expanding further into the Ethiopian highlands.

Many buildings in Massawa were designed and constructed by the Italians, who made a conscious effort to preserve the city's architectural heritage. Although most old structures had to be rebuilt or repaired, they retained their original scale and physical characteristics, as seen in the old Grand Mosque, Gami’ al-Khulafa ar-Rashidin. The Italians also maintained the layout of the city’s streets, preserving the irregular pattern of narrow, dense alleyways, which remains a defining feature of Massawa today. However, most of the city was completely destroyed by the 1921 earthquake. Post-1921 buildings were constructed using reinforced concrete, often faced with coral block or cement plaster, and typically featured multiple storeys with the character being more European. Between 1887 and 1932, they expanded the Eritrean Railway, connecting Massawa with Asmara and then Bishia near the Sudan border, and completed the Asmara-Massawa Cableway. At 75 kilometres (47 mi) long, it was the longest ropeway conveyor in the world at the time.

In 1928, Massawa had 15,000 inhabitants, of which 2,500 were Italians: the city was improved with an architectural plan similar to the one in Asmara, with a commercial and industrial area. With the rise of Fascism a segregation policy was implemented and with the passing of the "racial laws" soon became a real system of apartheid. Natives were segregated from residential areas, bars and restaurants reserved for the white population. However these laws did not stop relationships between Italian men and Eritrean women in the colonial territories. The result was a growing number of meticci (mulattos). Though the chief port of Italian Eritrea, Emilio De Bono who inspected the harbor in 1932 reported that the port had to be reconditioned as it was "absolutely lacking in wharves and facilities for the rapid landing and discharge of cargoes." As a result, the quays were widened, the breakwater lengthened to enable the simultaneous discharge of five steamers and the harbour was equipped with two large cranes.

During the Second Italo-Ethiopian War, Massawa served as a base for the Italian invasion of Ethiopia, which caused the town to be flooded with Italian soldiers. An American journalist reported at the height of the invasion, "The streets had obviously sprung up over night. Men slept in completely open barracks - just a skeleton frame-work of wood with galvanized iron roof." After the Second Italo-Ethiopian War, Massawa underwent significant and rapid development. The 115-km road to Asmara was improved, and an aerial cableway connecting Massawa with Asmara was constructed. The railway was extended to Taulud, and infrastructure projects included an electric power plant, fuel depots, a cement factory, new residential areas, a naval base on the Abdalqader Peninsula, and a military airport.

During World War II the United States ran a naval repair base at Massawa, the naval counterpart to its inland Project 19 aircraft depot at Gura, both funded under Lend-Lease. The U.S. Navy salvage officer Edward Ellsberg raised the ships and floating dry docks that the Italians had scuttled to block the harbor.

Following the end of World War II, the port of Massawa suffered damage as the occupying British either dismantled or destroyed much of the facilities. These actions were protested by Sylvia Pankhurst in her book Eritrea on the Eve.

=== Ethiopian rule ===
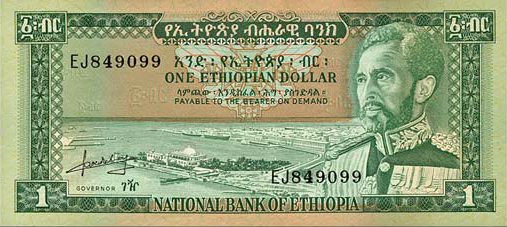
A view of the port of Massawa on the Ethiopian dollar note, during the reign of Haile Selassie.

Under the Ethiopian-Eritrean Federation (1952–62), Massawa developed as a naval base with American assistance. During this period, an Orthodox Church and a mosque were built. Unlike in other predominantly Muslim areas of Eritrea, part of Massawa's population supported Eritrea’s union with Ethiopia, viewing it as beneficial for trade and based on historical experience. However, Ethiopian interference in local administration and the increasing dominance of Christians led to various forms of protest, including docker strikes in 1954. Export products of Massawa at the time included fish (among them shark fins for export to China), pearls, tortoiseshells, and sea cucumbers (purchased by Japanese companies for export to China). The Imperial Palace of Massawa, located on Taulud Island, was established as Haile Selassie's winter palace. The population of Massawa increased greatly during the Ethiopian period, from 21,300 inhabitants in 1962 to c. 60,000 in the mid-1980s.

Political corruption and infrastructure deterioration under Ethiopian rule caused widespread discontentment in Eritrea. Andargachew Messai ordered the demolition of the Asmara-Massawa Cableway so that its parts can be sold to foreign companies. The destruction of the cableway led to the perception that the Ethiopians were plundering Eritrea. This growing discontentment led to all political parties being banned in 1956, however in 1958 massive popular strikes and protests occurred in Massawa to protest against Ethiopian policies in Eritrea. This was brutally suppressed by the Imperial Ethiopian Army, which killed hundreds of people.

In 1977–78, Massawa was under siege by the Eritrean Liberation Front (ELF), but the attacks were repelled by the Ethiopian garrison. After this, the Ethiopians purposely let the port fall into disrepair and opened another farther south and closer to their own borders in Assab, this resulted in the popular Eritrean saying: "The Italians built Eritrea, the British dismantled it and the Ethiopians destroyed it."

In February 1990, Massawa was captured by the Eritrean People's Liberation Front in a surprise attack from both land and sea during the Operation Fenkil. The battle utilized both infiltrated commandos and speed boats and resulted in the complete destruction of the Ethiopian 606th Corps. The success of this attack cut the major supply line to the Second Ethiopian Army in Asmara, which then had to be supplied by air. In response, the then leader of Ethiopia Mengistu Haile Mariam ordered shelling and aerial bombardment of Massawa, resulting in most of the city becoming completely destroyed.

=== Eritrean independence ===
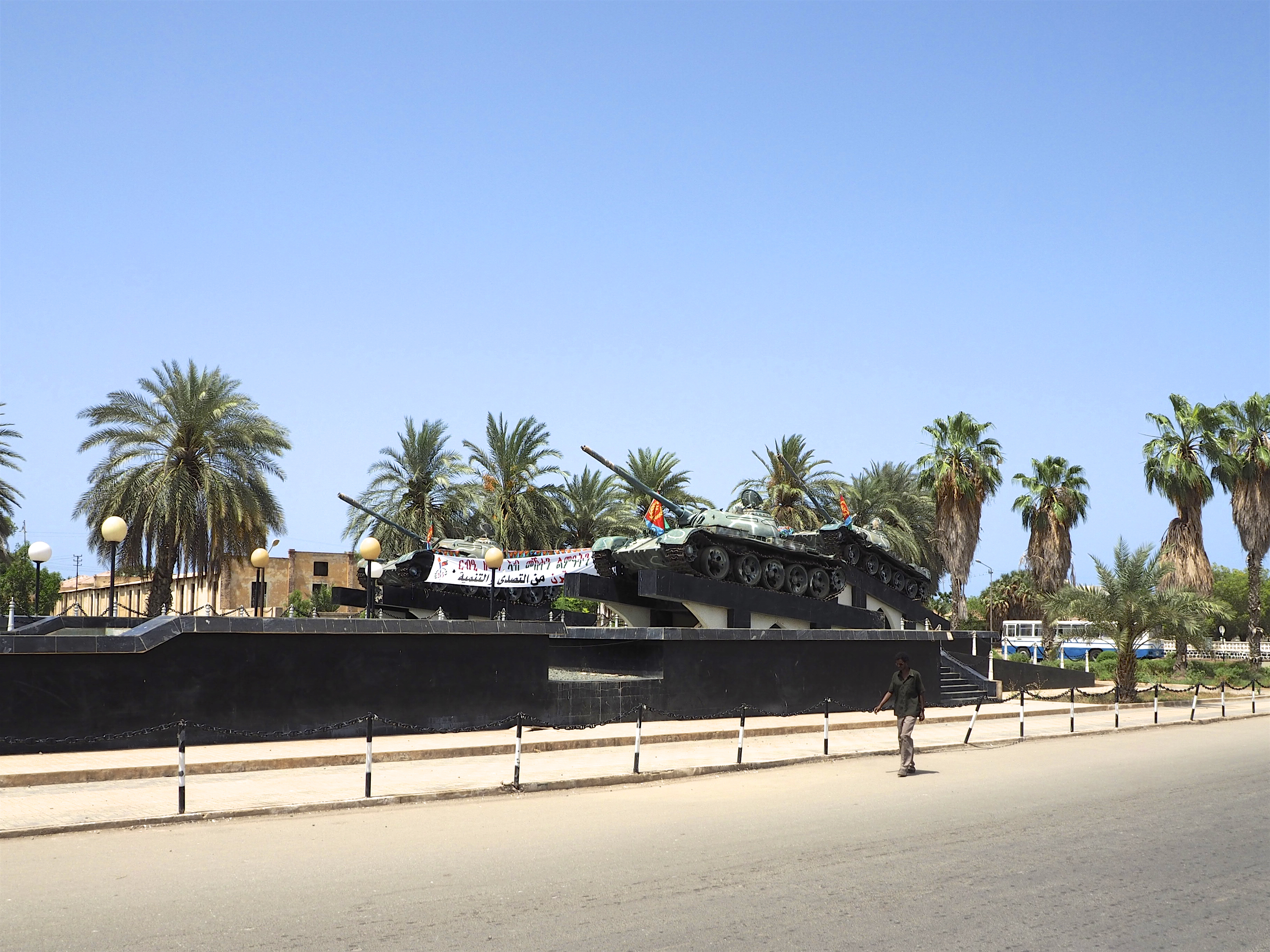
The War Memory Square.

With Eritrea's de facto independence (complete military liberation) in 1991, Ethiopia reverted to being landlocked and its Navy was dismantled (partially taken over by the nascent national navy of Eritrea). Despite this, Massawa remained largely in ruins, Donatella Lorch of The New York Times described the city in 1993:

Mortar blasts have torn through walls, most windows are shattered and the top floors of houses are caved in, a rubble of splintered beams. Charred palm trees line the streets, and parking lots have turned into graveyards of rusted cars and trucks. The one gasoline station in town has two skeletal pumps and the remains of a tank blasted to bits in the fighting. [...] The narrow alleyways hum with electric saws, and women sip thick black coffee as they sit on the dirt paths washing clothes and watching people walk by. The salt and cement factories are open again but working at far less than full capacity. The buildings are slowly being patched up, but there is still no housing for returning refugees. [...] But despite war and natural disaster, the people of Massawa have learned to make do. Hotels are open, even if the windows are shattered and the walls pocked by bullets. Volunteers sweep the streets daily. And the Mayor, who has not received a salary in two years, does not expect to get one soon.

During the Eritrean–Ethiopian War the port was inactive, primarily due to the closing of the Eritrean-Ethiopian border which cut off Massawa from its traditional hinterlands. A large grain vessel donated by the United States, containing 15,000 tonnes of relief food, which docked at the port late in 2001, was the first significant shipment handled by the port since the war began.

As of 2018, Massawa remains nearly deserted with decades of sanctions and isolationist policies causing trade to shrink and forcing much of the population to flee. However the harbour is of some use, serving to export copper and zinc from the nearby Bisha Mine while importing oil and consumer goods. Residents say that some months up to 10 ships arrive, and others, none.

== Transportation ==
Massawa is home to a naval base and large dhow docks. It also has a station on the railway line to Asmara. Ferries sail to the Dahlak Islands and the nearby Sheikh Saeed Island.

In addition, the city's air transportation needs are served by the Massawa International Airport.

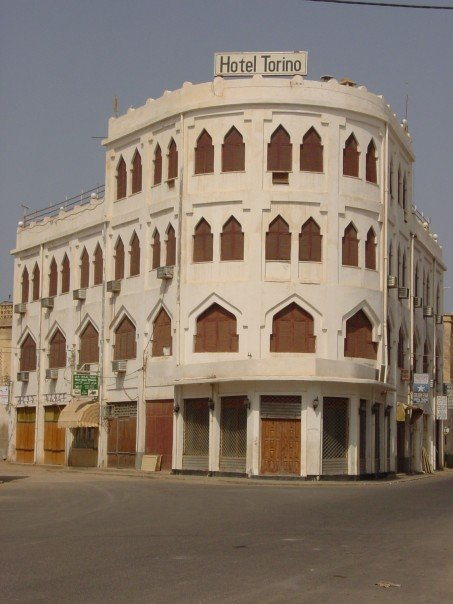
The "Hotel Torino" (built in 1938), an example of Venetian influenced architecture in the old section of the city.

== Main sights ==
Buildings in the city include the shrine of Sahaba, as well as the 15th century Sheikh Hanafi Mosque and various houses of coral. Many buildings, for example some unfinished Ottoman buildings, survive. The local bazaar as well. Later buildings include the Imperial Palace, built in 1872 to 1874 for Werner Munzinger; St. Mary's Cathedral; and the 1920s Banca d'Italia. The Eritrean War of Independence is commemorated in a memorial of three tanks in the middle of Massawa.

== Climate ==
Massawa has a hot desert climate (Köppen climate classification BWh). The city receives a very low average annual rainfall amount totalling around 185 millimetres (7.28 in) and consistently experiences soaringly high temperatures during both day and night. The annual mean average temperature approaches 30 °C (86 °F), which is one of the highest found in the world. Massawa is noted for its very high summer humidity despite being a desert city. This combination of the desert heat and high humidity makes the apparent temperatures seem even more extreme. The sky is usually clear and bright throughout the year.

Climate data for Massawa (1961 to 1990)
Month	Jan	Feb	Mar	Apr	May	Jun	Jul	Aug	Sep	Oct	Nov	Dec	Year
Mean daily maximum °C (°F)	29.1 (84.4)	29.4 (84.9)	31.8 (89.2)	33.9 (93.0)	36.8 (98.2)	40.2 (104.4)	40.8 (105.4)	40.3 (104.5)	38.7 (101.7)	35.6 (96.1)	33.1 (91.6)	30.5 (86.9)	35.0 (95.0)
Daily mean °C (°F)	24.3 (75.7)	24.3 (75.7)	25.9 (78.6)	27.9 (82.2)	30.0 (86.0)	33.0 (91.4)	34.3 (93.7)	33.9 (93.0)	32.1 (89.8)	29.5 (85.1)	27.1 (80.8)	25.2 (77.4)	29.0 (84.2)
Mean daily minimum °C (°F)	19.1 (66.4)	19.1 (66.4)	20.1 (68.2)	21.8 (71.2)	23.5 (74.3)	25.7 (78.3)	27.7 (81.9)	27.5 (81.5)	25.5 (77.9)	23.3 (73.9)	21.0 (69.8)	19.7 (67.5)	22.8 (73.0)
Average rainfall mm (inches)	34.7 (1.37)	22.2 (0.87)	10.2 (0.40)	3.9 (0.15)	7.6 (0.30)	0.4 (0.02)	7.8 (0.31)	7.8 (0.31)	2.7 (0.11)	22.4 (0.88)	24.1 (0.95)	39.5 (1.56)	183.3 (7.23)
Average rainy days (≥ 1.0 mm)	3.1	2.0	1.6	0.9	0.6	0.1	0.5	0.5	0.1	1.6	1.4	2.7	15.1
Average relative humidity (%)	76.3	75.3	73.3	70.5	65.0	53.8	53.0	55.6	60.8	66.6	69.1	74.5	66.1
Source: NOAA

== Notable people ==
- Wilhelm Friedrich Hemprich (1796–1825), German naturalist and explorer, died in Massawa

== See also ==
- Massawa International Airport
