= Railway stations in Sudan =

Railways in Sudan Blue = 1067mm gauge Red = 1000mm gauge dotted = out of use or proposed

Railway stations in Sudan include:

== Maps ==
- UNHCR Atlas Map
- UN Map
- Different maps
- Aljabalan map
- Sudan and South Sudan Map

== Existing and Proposed ==
- (Egypt) Aswan - 0 km
- (Egypt) Toshka & Abu Simbel - proposed branch
- (Egypt) (Sudan) - border
- (Sudan) Wadi Halfa - N - potential break-of-gauge with Egypt
  - Merowe
  - Karima - branch terminus on River Nile - N
- (Sudan) Abu Hamed - N junction for Karima
- (Sudan) Barbar
- (Sudan) Atbara - N - junction and workshops
- Ad-Damir

- Port Sudan - E
- Jubayt - N
- Sinkat - N
- Hayya - N - junction
- Gadamai
- Shendi
- Omdurman
- (Sudan) Khartoum - C - national capital - 910 km
- (Sudan) Kassala - E - stillborn link to Eritrea
- Gedaref - E
- Wad Medani - C
- Sannar - S - junction to West
- Rabak - east bank of River Nile; bridge; junction to south to Al Jabalayn
  - El jebelein - C - branch terminus
- Kosti - C - west bank of River Nile; bridge
- Tandalti - W
- Abu Zabad - W

- Sannar - S - junction
- Damazin - S

- Muglad - S
- Aweil - S - South Sudan

- Muglad - junction to oil fields
- Abu Jabra - oil fields

- Ar Rahad - S - junction
- Al Ubayyid aka El Obeid - E - railhead

- (Sudan) Ar Rahad - S - junction
- (Sudan) Babanusa - S - junction
- (Sudan) (South Sudan) border
- Aweil - S - South Sudan
- Wau - S - terminus - on Jur River - South Sudan

- Babanusa - S - junction
- Nyala - W - terminus
- Purram
- Tumburra
- Samsum

- Kassala - nearest station in Sudan to former link line to Eritrea
- Teseney, Eritrea - discontinued - break of gauge 1067mm/950mm

=== Ferry ===
A weekly ferry service on the Nile River connects the Egyptian railhead at Aswan with the Sudan railhead at Wadi Halfa.

== Reopen ==
- Babanusa Junction
- Wau

== Proposed ==
- Link to Egypt - May 2008
- (Egypt) Aswan
- (Egypt) (Sudan) border
- (Sudan) Wadi Halfa - N

(connection to Uganda - North to South) - Electrification proposed

- (South Sudan) Wau - 1,067 mm (3 ft 6 in) gauge
- (South Sudan) Juba - port on River Nile; national capital
- (South Sudan) (Uganda) Nimule - border
- (Uganda) Gulu1,000 mm (3 ft 3 3/8 in) gauge
- Tororo, Uganda
- (Uganda) Pakwach - port on White Nile

- (Kenya) Rongai
- (Kenya) Lake Baringo
- (Kenya) Lokichar
- (Kenya) Lodwar
- border Kenya-South Sudan
- (South Sudan) Juba

(connection to Kenya)

- (Kenya) Garissa
- (Kenya) Rongai
- (Kenya) Mombassa - port

(connection to Ethiopia)

- (standard gauge)
- Ethiopia
- (Ethiopia) Addis Ababa (0 km)
- (Ethiopia) Bedele (491 km)
- border Ethiopia-Sudan
  - (Sudan) junction.
  - branch to Port Sudan.
- (Sudan) Khartoum

- Transcontinental railway from Dakar and/or from Cameroon to Port Sudan via Chad.

== See also ==
- Egypt-Sudan Railway Committee
- Transport in Sudan
- Rail transport in Sudan
- Railway stations in Egypt
- Railway stations in Eritrea
- Railway stations in Ethiopia
- Railway stations in South Sudan
- Railway stations in Uganda
