= Frank Broome (pilot) =

Captain Frank Broome DFC AFC
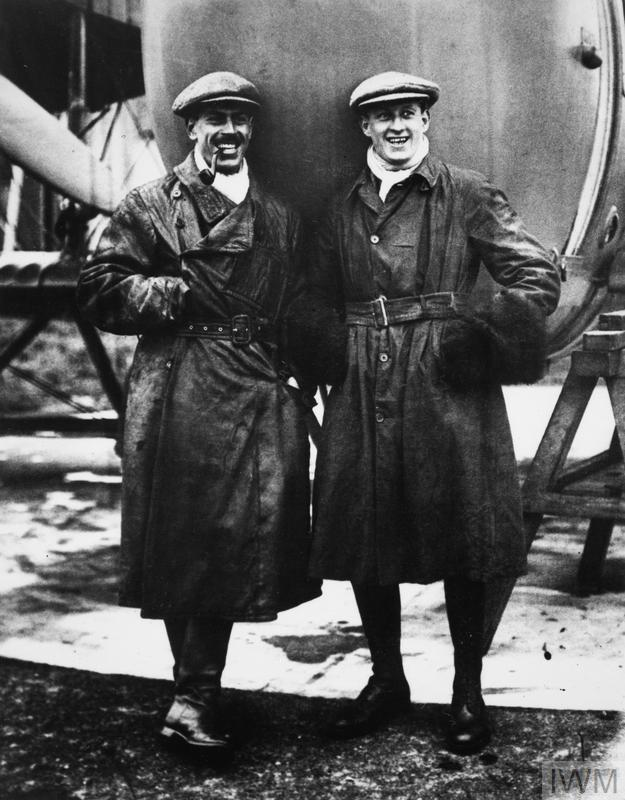
- Frank Crossley Griffiths Broome (left) and Stanley Cockerell before their start in Vickers Vimy Commercial G-EAAV in 1920 to fly the Cope.
- Born: 7 March 1892; St Pancras, London, England
- Died: 16 April 1948 (aged 56)
- Military career
- Allegiance: United Kingdom
- Branch: The Middlesex Regiment; Army Service Corps; Royal Flying Corps; Royal Air Force
- Rank: Captain

Captain Frank Crossley Griffithes Broome DFC AFC (7 March 1892 – 16 April 1948) was a British World War I pilot who later became a test pilot for Vickers and attempted the first flight from Cairo to Cape Town.

== Early life ==
Broome was born in St Pancras, London, younger son of another Frank Broome, and educated at Uppingham School. After leaving school, he spent three years in Australia working on cattle ranches, returning to England in 1914.

== World War I ==
Ten days after the outbreak of war, Broome enlisted in the Middlesex Regiment. The following year he obtained a commission in the Horse Transport Section of the Army Service Corps. In 1917, he transferred to the Royal Flying Corps (which became the Royal Air Force in 1918). After obtaining his pilot's licence, he was posted to Hadleigh to take part in the air defence of London with 112 Squadron. In 1918, he returned to France with 151 Squadron. He was then a lieutenant. In one week he destroyed three German aircraft, his only three victories. One of these was a giant Zeppelin-Staaken R.VI bomber he shot down over Beugny, France, while flying a Sopwith Camel during the night of 15–16 September 1918, one of the only two R.VI bombers the Germans lost to enemy action in World War I and the only one shot down by an Allied aircraft. For this achievement, he was awarded the Distinguished Flying Cross (DFC) on 3 December 1918. The citation read:

A bold and skilful officer who has displayed conspicuous courage and judgment in many engagements with hostile machines, notably on the night of 15/16th September, when he observed a giant bombing machine held by searchlights and engaged by our anti-aircraft guns. His signals to the guns were not observed and the fire continued, shells bursting all round the enemy machine; disregarding this he, with conspicuous gallantry, closed to 100 yards [91 meters] and drove the machine down in flames.

On 14 November 1918, Broome was promoted to the acting rank of captain.

== Post-World War I ==
Broome was demobilised in January 1919 and shortly afterwards joined Vickers as a test pilot.

On 24 June 1920, Broome and Captain Stanley Cockerell (who had been his flight commander in 151 Squadron) took off from Brooklands in a Vickers Vimy on a pioneering flight to South Africa in an attempt to test the air route from Cairo to the Cape of Good Hope. They were accompanied by mechanic Sergeant-Major James Wyatt MSM, rigger Claude Corby, and passenger Peter Chalmers Mitchell, an eminent zoologist and correspondent for The Times, which sponsored the flight. That evening they arrived at RAF Manston in Kent. The following day they crossed the English Channel and arrived at Lyon. They reached Istres on 26 January, Rome on 27 January, Malta on 29 January, Tripoli on 31 January (having been held up by storms the previous day), Benghazi on 1 February, and Heliopolis near Cairo on 3 February. On 6 February, they set out for the main flight to South Africa and reached Aswan. On 8 February, after two forced landings caused by leaking cylinder water jackets, they reached Khartoum. After repairs, they left Khartoum on 10 February and reached El Jebelein, 208 miles to the south. Following further repairs, they left later the same day, but were forced to land in a dry swamp near Renk. The following day they returned to Jebelein for further repairs. On 14 February, they set off again and reached Mongalla, in the far south of Sudan the following day, after spending the night on the banks of the Nile. They remained in Mongalla making repairs until 20 February, when they took off again and reached Nimule, again with engine trouble. They began again on 22 February and reached Uganda in Uganda. On 24 February they left again and reached Kisumu in Kenya. They reached Tabora in Tanganyika Territory on 26 February, but crashed on take-off the following day, writing off the machine and ending the flight. Cockerell and Corby were slightly injured. Cockerell and Broome did eventually reach Cape Town, although not by air, and were welcomed by, among others, Pierre van Ryneveld and Quintin Brand, who had made the flight successfully by a slightly different route and were the only one of five crews attempting the journey to successfully complete it. On 12 July 1920, Cockerell and Broome were awarded the Air Force Cross (AFC) and Wyatt and Corby the Air Force Medal (AFM) in recognition of the flight.

On 15 March 1922, he was with Cockerell and Wyatt when they were forced to ditch a flying boat in the Channel four miles off Hastings while making a test flight from Portsmouth to Sheerness. They were rescued from the water by rowing boat.

During World War II, he returned to RAF service in the Administrative and Special Duties Branch on 7 July 1941 with the rank of pilot officer, but resigned his commission due to ill-health on 15 October 1942 and was allowed to keep the rank of flight lieutenant (equivalent to the rank he had previously held in World War I).

== Family ==
Broome married Nancy Ismay Lermitte at Great Horkesley, near Colchester, on 17 August 1920. Cockerell was his best man and the wedding cake was ornamented with a silver model of the Vickers Vimy in which they had crossed Africa, presented to Broome by The Times. They were later divorced and Broome remarried.
