= Saras, Sudan =

Town in Sudan

Coordinates: 21°34′00″N 31°06′00″E

Saras or Sarras was a 19th-century village in Sudan along the Nile River in the present state of Northern Sudan. It was briefly important as the southern terminus of Isma'il Pasha's abortive 3 ft 6 in (1,067 mm) railway into Sudan constructed in 1877. The line was destroyed by the Sudanese during the early phases of the Mahdi War and then reconstructed by the British to supply the 1896 Dongola Expedition. The line was badly sited and (in its reconstruction) hastily put together and was abandoned in 1904.

The present site is scarcely populated but sometimes divided into Saras East and Saras West according to the settlements' position relative to the Nile.
