= Arthur Gerald Knight =

British Pilot

- Born: 30 July 1895; Bedford, Bedfordshire, England
- Died: 20 December 1916 (aged 21); Monchy-au-Bois, France
- Burial place: Douchy-lès-Ayette British Cemetery, Pas de Calais, France; 50°10′31″N 2°43′17″E
- Military career
- Allegiance: Canada; United Kingdom
- Branch: Royal Flying Corps
- Service years: 1915-1916
- Rank: Captain
- Nicknames: Gerry, Jerry
- Units: No. 4 Squadron RFC; No. 24 Squadron RFC; No. 29 Squadron RFC
- Commands: "B" Flight, No. 29 Squadron
- Awards: Distinguished Service Order; Military Cross

Captain Arthur Gerald Knight DSO, MC (30 July 1895 – 20 December 1916) was a British World War I flying ace credited with eight aerial victories. He was under attack by Oswald Boelcke and Erwin Böhme when they collided, causing Boelcke's death. Two months later, Knight would fall under the guns of Manfred von Richthofen, who had also been in the dogfight when Boelcke was killed.

== Early life ==
Arthur Gerald Knight was the son of Arthur Cecil Knight and Isabella Jael Knight (née Balston). The younger Knight was a student of Applied Science at Upper Canada College when he joined the Royal Flying Corps in 1915.

== World War I service ==
=== Aerial victories ===
Knight was assigned to the command of Major Lanoe Hawker. He began his victory string on 22 June 1916, using an Airco DH.2 of No. 24 Squadron RFC to destroy an LVG C model reconnaissance aircraft over Courcelette. His next two wins were of the "driven down out of control" variety, but for his fourth triumph on 14 September he helped Stanley Cockerell flame a Fokker fighter. The following day, he singlehandedly flamed another German fighter; a month later, he drove a Roland C.II down out of control. On 9 November 1916, he shared the destruction of an enemy fighter with Alfred Edwin McKay and Eric Pashley. Knight's Military Cross was awarded five days later.

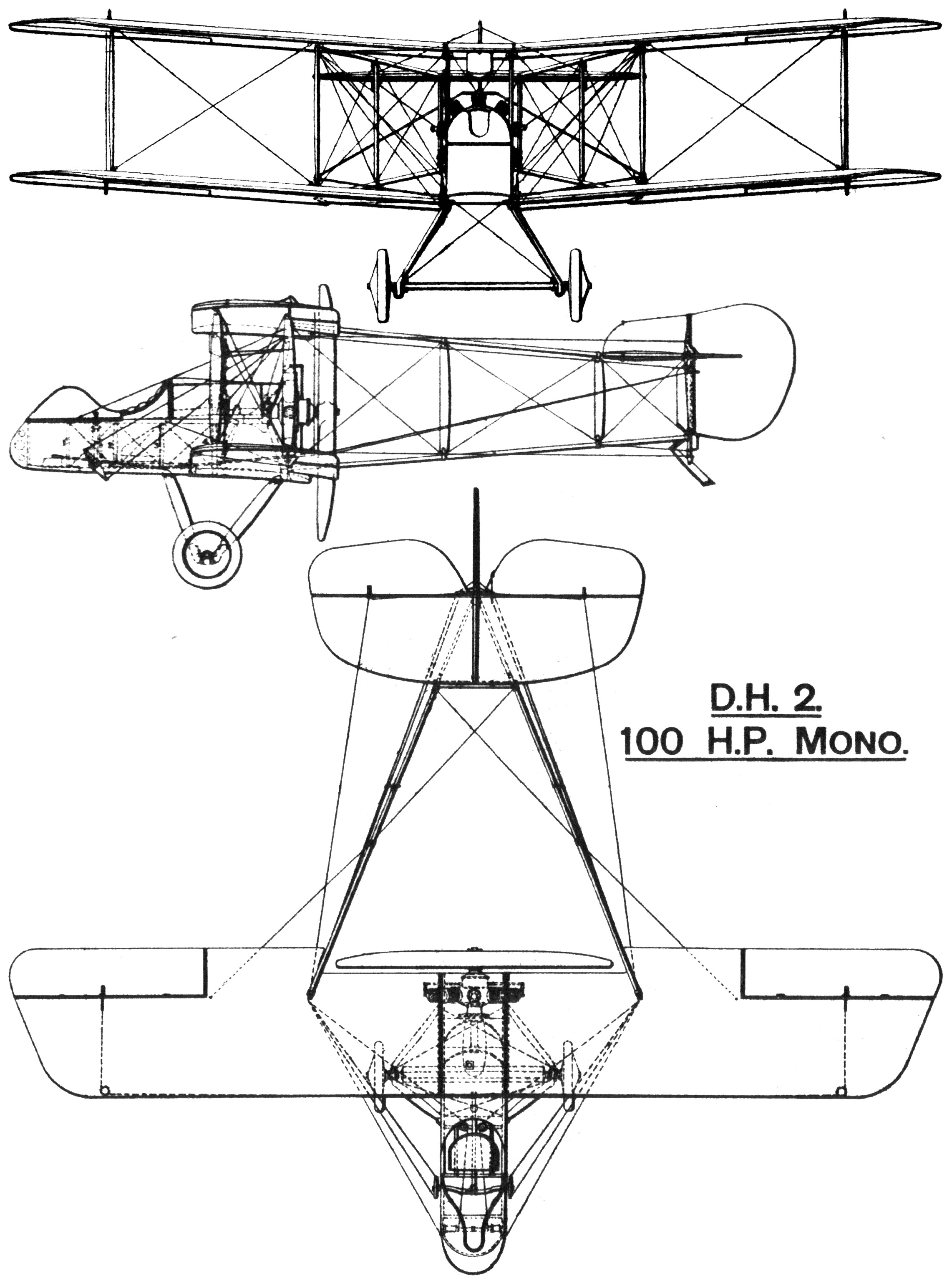
This drawing shows the primitive simplicity of the Airco DH.2

=== Notable combats ===
On 28 October, Knight was under attack by Boelcke and Böhme when McKay, pursued by Richthofen, cut across between Knight and his assailants. In the resultant dodges and swerves, Böhme's plane's landing gear wheels damaged Boelcke's upper wing, and Boelcke fell to his death.

Knight transferred to No. 29 Squadron RFC as the flight commander, B Flight, still flying a DH.2. On 11 December 1916, he was awarded the Distinguished Service Order. He scored his eighth victory five days later, downing an enemy fighter northeast of Arras, and continuing his assault on a second despite a broken machine gun extractor. Four days later, he led his final patrol before ten days' leave. He did not return. His patrol of four made it back, but badly battered by combat. Knight had become the Red Baron's thirteenth victim.

The only known description of Knight's end comes from the victor's combat report: "...I attacked him at closest range.... I saw immediately that I had hit the enemy. First he went down in curves, then he crashed to the ground. I pursued him until 100 metres above the ground."

== Honours and awards ==
Military Cross
Second Lieutenant Arthur Gerald Knight, Royal Flying Corps, Special Reserve.

"For conspicuous skill and gallantry. He has shown great pluck in fights with enemy machines, and has accounted for several. On one occasion, when a hostile machine was interfering with a reconnaissance, he attacked at very close range, and brought down the enemy machine in flames.

Distinguished Service Order
Second Lieutenant Arthur Gerald Knight, MC, Royal Flying Corps.

"For conspicuous gallantry in action. He led four machines against 18 hostile machines. Choosing a good moment for attack he drove down five of them and dispersed the remainder. He has shown the utmost dash and judgment as a leader of offensive patrols."

== Bibliography ==
- Guttman, Jon & Dempsey, Harry (2009). Pusher Aces of World War I. Osprey Publishing. ISBN 978-1-84603-417-6.
- Shores, Christopher F.; Franks, Norman & Guest, Russell F. (1990). Above the Trenches: a Complete Record of the Fighter Aces and Units of the British Empire Air Forces 1915–1920. London, UK: Grub Street. ISBN 978-0-948817-19-9.
