= Egypt–Sudan Railway Committee =

Egypt–Sudan Railway Committee (ESRC) is a multinational committee that was created in 2008 to promote railway connecting lines between Egypt and Sudan.

== Plan ==
The proposed railway line to link the two countries is between Aswan and Wadi Halfa. The line will be around 500 km in length.

The plan with distance is as follows:

- (Egypt) Aswan (0 km)
- (Egypt) (Sudan) border (450 km)
- (Sudan) Wadi Halfa (500 km)
- (Sudan) Khartoum capital {900 km)

== Timeline ==
=== 2021 ===
- Agreement

== Challenges ==
The main problem is the difference in terms of gauge between the two countries which lead to a Break of gauge.

Egypt has the standard gauge of 1,435 mm (4 ft 8 1/2 in) whereas Sudan uses a narrow gauge of 1,067 mm (3 ft 6 in) .

It is expected that the line between Khartoum and Wadi Halfa would be upgraded to standard gauge.

Standard gauge would also enhance the extension of the line to serve other countries in the Nile valley.

Other challenges include adoption of

Couplings - English (Egypt) - American AAR (Sudan)
Brakes - Vacuum or Air
Electrification - 25kVAC

== Ferry ==
A weekly ferry service on the Nile River connects the Egyptian railhead at Aswan with the Sudan railhead at Wadi Halfa. This ferry is made redundant by the new rail link.

== See also ==
- Railway stations in Sudan
- Railway stations in Egypt
