= 1989 El Jebelein massacre =

Massacre in Sudan

El Jebelein massacre
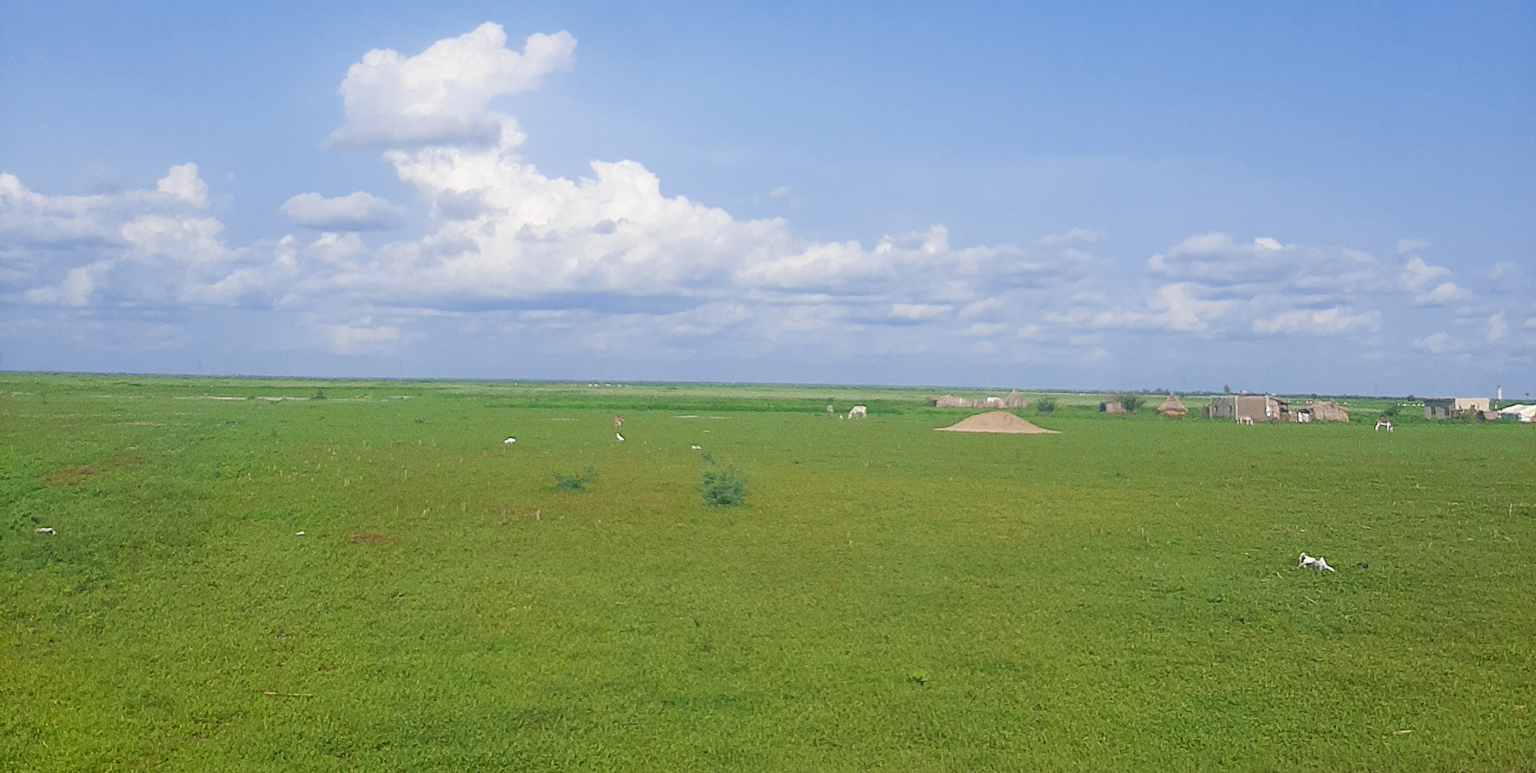

- 1989 El Jebelein massacre (Sudan)
- Location: 12°35′07″N 32°48′26″E; El Jebelein, White Nile State
- Date: 28–29 December 1989
- Target: Shilluk people
- Attack type: Mass murder, Revenge killing
- Weapon: Guns
- Deaths: 200–1,500+
- Perpetrator: Local Arab militias

El Jebelein massacre was a massacre that began on 28 December 1989, and was committed against Shilluk laborers in the city of El Jebelein, Sudan. The massacre was perpetrated by a local Arab militia and left between 200 and 1,500 civilians dead.

== Background ==
Historically, El Jebelein has been inhabited by Nuer and Shilluk tribes and the Shilluk Kingdom once extended up to El Jeblein. Shilluk labourers had lived in El Jebelein since the 1950s, working on the mechanized farms and pump schemes. Before the massacre, relations between the Christian Shilluks and the local Muslim Tais'ha people had been relatively peaceful, although the region was volatile due to the influx of displaced people coming from Southern Sudan after the Second Sudanese Civil War, which had started six years earlier in 1983.

== Massacre ==
On the morning of 28 December, a farmer from the Arab Sabaha tribe came to El Jebelein from the nearby village of Umm Korta. He demanded eleven Shilluk labourers assist in the harvest of his sorghum crop. The Shilluk men refused the work, stating that they were still celebrating Christmas. An argument ensued between the farmer and the workers. During this argument, the Shilluk workers attacked and killed the farmer. The dead farmer's driver returned to Umm Korta where he reported the incident to his kinsmen. The kinsmen then gathered and descended on El Jebelein in eight trucks, armed with automatic weapons. Meanwhile, the Shilluk involved in the killing had been arrested and detained in a local police station.

Around 11:00 am local time, the Arab militiamen surrounded the police station which was filled with Shilluk villagers who had taken refuge from the fighting. Three police officers guarding the station fled when the militia attacked, after which all Shilluk in the station were killed. Shilluk were also killed in the surrounding fields of El Jebelein and in the nearby villages of Idreissa and Musran. The massacre continued until 29 December, when the Sudanese army and police arrived in El Jebelein and brought the situation under control.

The death toll is contested. The Sudanese government initially said that around 184 people had been killed in the massacre later raised the number of dead to 214. Western officials in Khartoum claimed that the massacre had killed between 300 and 1,500 people. Eyewitnesses counted more than 500 bodies, including those of 100 children, recovered from the Nile more than a week after the massacre. In addition to Shilluk, some Dinka, Nuer, and Burun people were killed.

== Aftermath ==
The government denied involvement in the massacre, stating that it had been "tribal fighting." An official inquiry was launched, but its findings were never made public.

The motive for the massacre remains unclear. The Sabaha had no history of tribal conflict with the Shilluk, but some accounts alleged that the conflict stemmed from the fears that Shilluk laborers were competing with the Sabaha for scarce jobs, and driving down wage levels. The Sabaha were given arms by the Sadiq al-Mahdi government in 1986, which increased the extent of the bloodshed.
