= Muglad =

Mujlad المجلد
- City
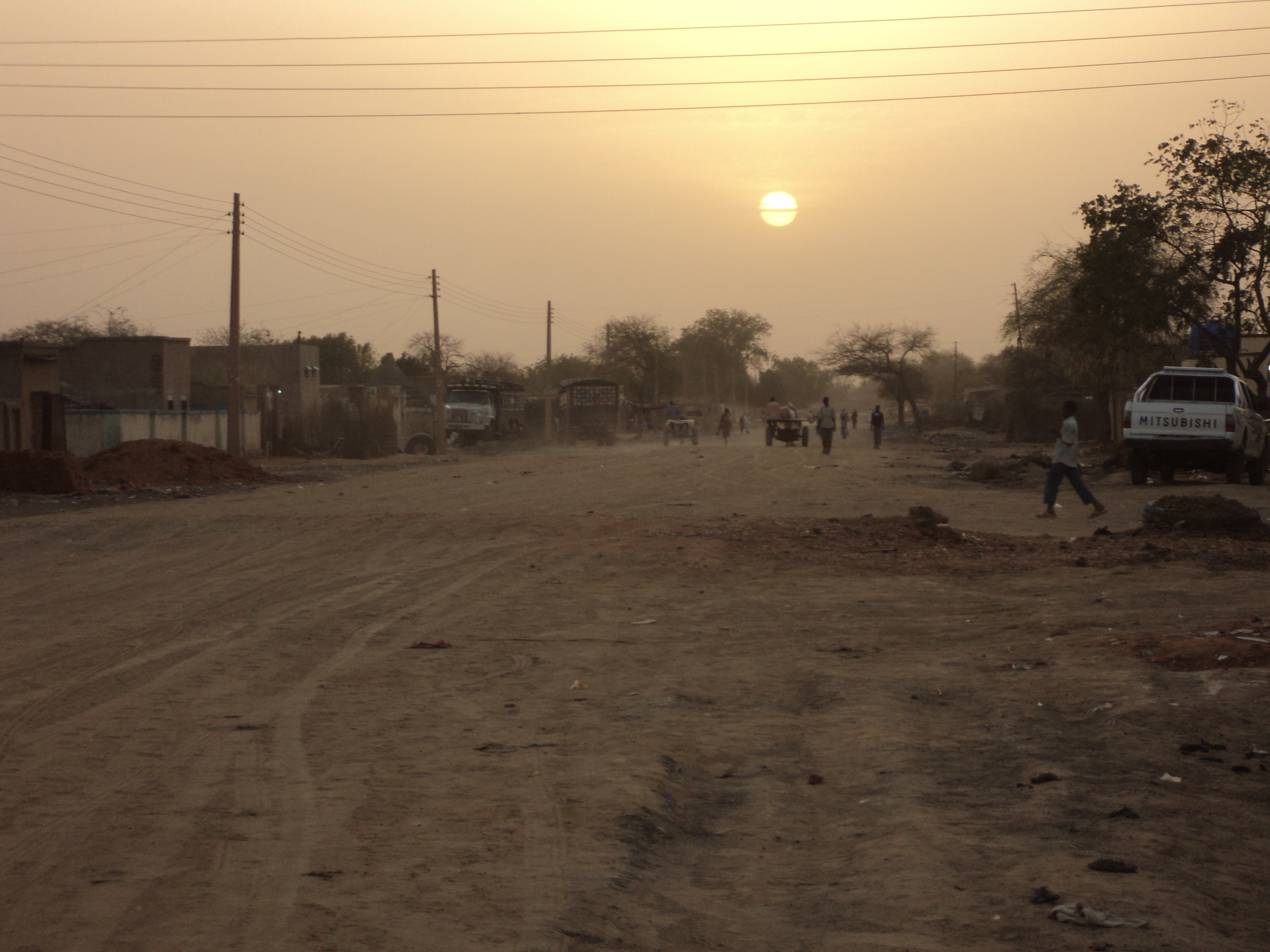
- Muglad in front of ICRC office 2011

- Location in Sudan
- Coordinates: 11°2′2″N 27°44′24″E
- Country: Sudan
- State: West Kurdufan
- Control: Rapid Support Forces

Government
  - Type: Federal government, tribal administration
  - Nadhir: Mukhtar Babo Nimir
  - Naib Nadhir (deputy tribe prince): Muslam Mustafa

Population
  - Total: 985,000
  - Religions: Muslims

Mujlad (Arabic: المجلد), also spelled Muglad, is a city in West Kordofan state in the west of Sudan. It is the center of the Misseriya tribe, sometimes also transliterated as "Messeria".

In the late seventies and early eighties, Muglad was used as a staging area for oil field operations, mainly by California-based Chevron, due to its location within the Muglad Basin. At the Muglad airport, air operations were conducted in DC-3, Convair and also leased Hercules from Transamerica to link the PP West with the capital Khartoum.

== Transport ==
It is served by a railway station on the Waw branch of Sudan Railways. It is the junction for a branch line to the oil fields at Abu Jabra.

== See also ==
- Railway stations in Sudan
