= Rail transport in Sudan =

Railways in Sudan

Sudan has 4,725 kilometers of narrow-gauge, single-track railways. The main line runs from Wadi Halfa on the Egyptian border to Khartoum and southwest to El Obeid via Sennar and Kosti, with extensions to Nyala in Southern Darfur and Wau in Western Bahr al Ghazal, South Sudan. Other lines connect Atbara and Sennar with Port Sudan, and Sennar with Ad-Damazin. A 1,400-kilometer line serves the Al Jazirah cotton-growing region. There are plans to rehabilitate rail transport to reverse decades of neglect and declining efficiency. Service on some lines may be interrupted during the rainy season.

== Statistics ==
As of 2022 the Sudan Railways Corporation maintains 4,578 km of 1,067 mm (3 ft 6 in) gauge rail. The main line linking Khartoum to Port Sudan carries over two-thirds of Sudan's rail traffic.

== Sudan Railways ==
Sudan Railways is Sudan's main railway system and is operated by the government-owned Sudan Railways Corporation (SRC), provides services to most of the country's production and consumption centers. Rail dominated commercial transport in the early years of independent Sudan but competition from highways increased rapidly and by 2013, 90% of inland transport in Sudan was by road. The main rail system was reorganised into two parts; the SRC which owned the physical assets of the Sudan Railways and the other part being a collection of private companies which organise the operation of the network. In 2013 10 private companies were reported to be running operations in different lines.

== History ==
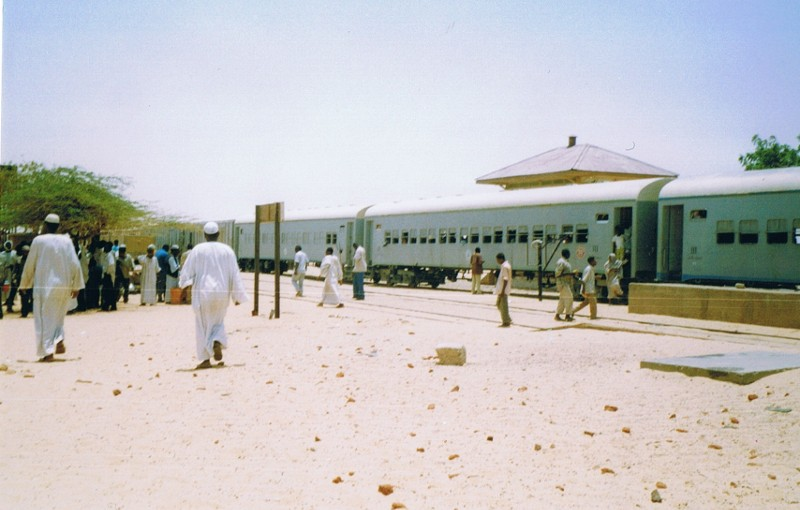
Railway station in northern Sudan

The history of rail transport in Sudan began in 1874 when the Khedive of Egypt Isma'il Pasha established a line from Wadi Halfa to Sarras about 54 km upstream on the east bank of the Nile, as a commercial undertaking. The line did not prove to be commercially viable, and operations were stopped by the Governor-General Charles Gordon in 1878 to reduce expenditure. In 1884, the line was extended to Akasha on the Nile by the Nile Expedition, but was destroyed by the Ansar when the Anglo-Egyptian troops withdrew to Wadi Halfa.

In 1884, during the Red Sea Expedition, John Aird & Co. constructed a 20-mile (32 km) line from Suakin on the Red Sea inland to Otau, but it was abandoned in 1885. In May 1887, the Wadi Halfa-Saras line was extended again to Kerma, above the third cataract, to support the Anglo-Egyptian Dongola Expedition against the Mahdist State. The line, which was poorly constructed and of little other use, was abandoned in 1905.

The first segment of the present-day Sudan Railways, from Wadi Halfa to Abu Hamad on the Nile, was also a military undertaking. It was built by the British in the late 1890s, for use in General Herbert Kitchener's drive against the Mahdist State. During the campaign, the line was pushed to Atbara on the Nile in 1897 and, after the Battle of Omdurman in 1898, was continued to Khartoum, which it reached on the last day of 1899. The line was built in the 1,067 mm (3 ft 6 in) gauge, the result of Kitchener's use of the rolling stock and rails of that gauge from the old line. That gauge became the standard for all later Sudanese mainline construction.

The line opened a trade route from central Sudan through Egypt to the Mediterranean. The line became uneconomical due to the distance and the need to ship things via boat down the Nile, so, in 1904, construction of a new line from Atbara to the Red Sea was undertaken, with the line being completed in October 1905. In 1906, the new line reached the recently built Port Sudan to provide a direct connection between Khartoum and ocean-going transport.

In 1911, a line was also constructed from Khartoum southward to Sennar within the cotton-growing region of Al Jazirah. In February 1912, a westward continuation reached El Obeid, then the country's second-largest city, and the center of gum arabic production. In the north, a branch line was built from near Abu Hamad to Karima that tied the navigable stretch of the Nile between the fourth and third cataracts into the transport system. Traffic in this case, however, was largely inbound to towns along the river, a situation that still prevailed in 1990.

In the 1920s, a spur of the railway was built from Hayya, a point on the main line 200 km southwest of Port Sudan, then extended south to the cotton-producing area near Kassala, the grain region of Al Qadarif and, finally, to a junction with the main line at Sennar. Much of the area's traffic, which formerly had passed through Khartoum, has since moved over that line directly to Port Sudan.

The final phase of railway construction began in the 1950s. It included extension of the western line to Nyala (1959) in Darfur Province, and a southwesterly branch to Wau (1961), southern Sudan's second largest city, located in Bahr el Ghazal. That essentially completed the Sudan Railways network, which totalled about 4,800 route km in 1990. There were small later extensions from Abu Gabra to El Muglad (52 km in 1995), El Obeid to the El Obeid refinery (10 km), and El Ban to the Merowe Dam (10 km).

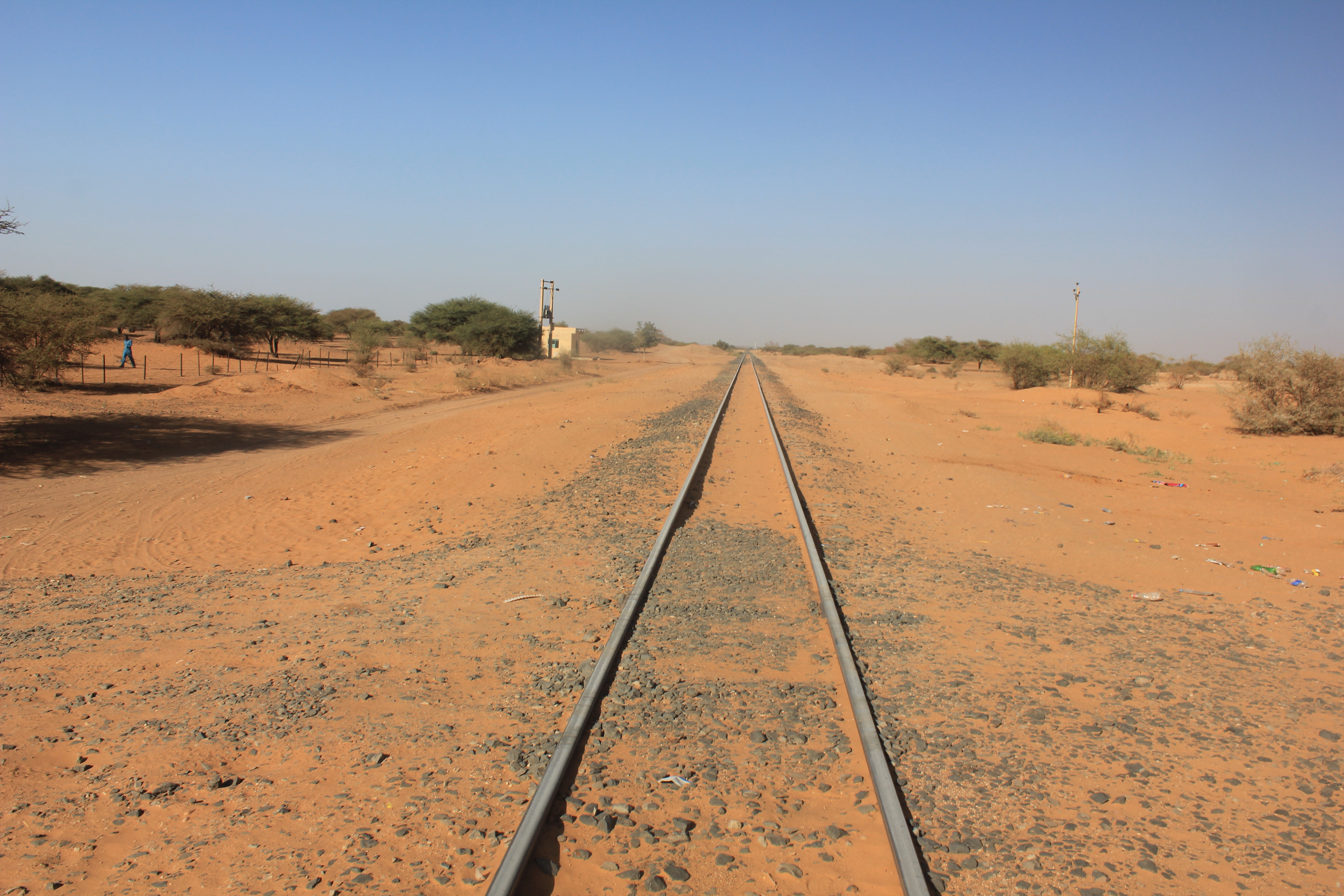
Railway tracks at Meroë

Rail construction timeline
Route	Years	Length
Wadi Halfa – Abu Hamad	1897–1898	350 km
Abu Hamad – Atbara	1898	244 km
Atbara–Khartoum	1898–1900	313 km
Atbara – Port Sudan	1904–1906	474 km
Station No. 10 – Karima	1905	222 km
Khartoum – Kosti – El Obeid	1909–1911	689 km
Hayya–Kassala	1923–1924	347 km
Kassala–Gedarif	1924–1928	218 km
Gedarif–Sennar	1928–1929	237 km
Sennar–Damazin	1953–1954	227 km
Aradeiba Junction – Babanusa	1956–1957	354 km
Babanusa – Nyala	1957–1959	335 km
Babanusa–Wau	1959–1962	444 km
Girba–Digiam	1962	70 km
Muglad – Abu Gabra	1995	52 km

=== Diesel traction ===
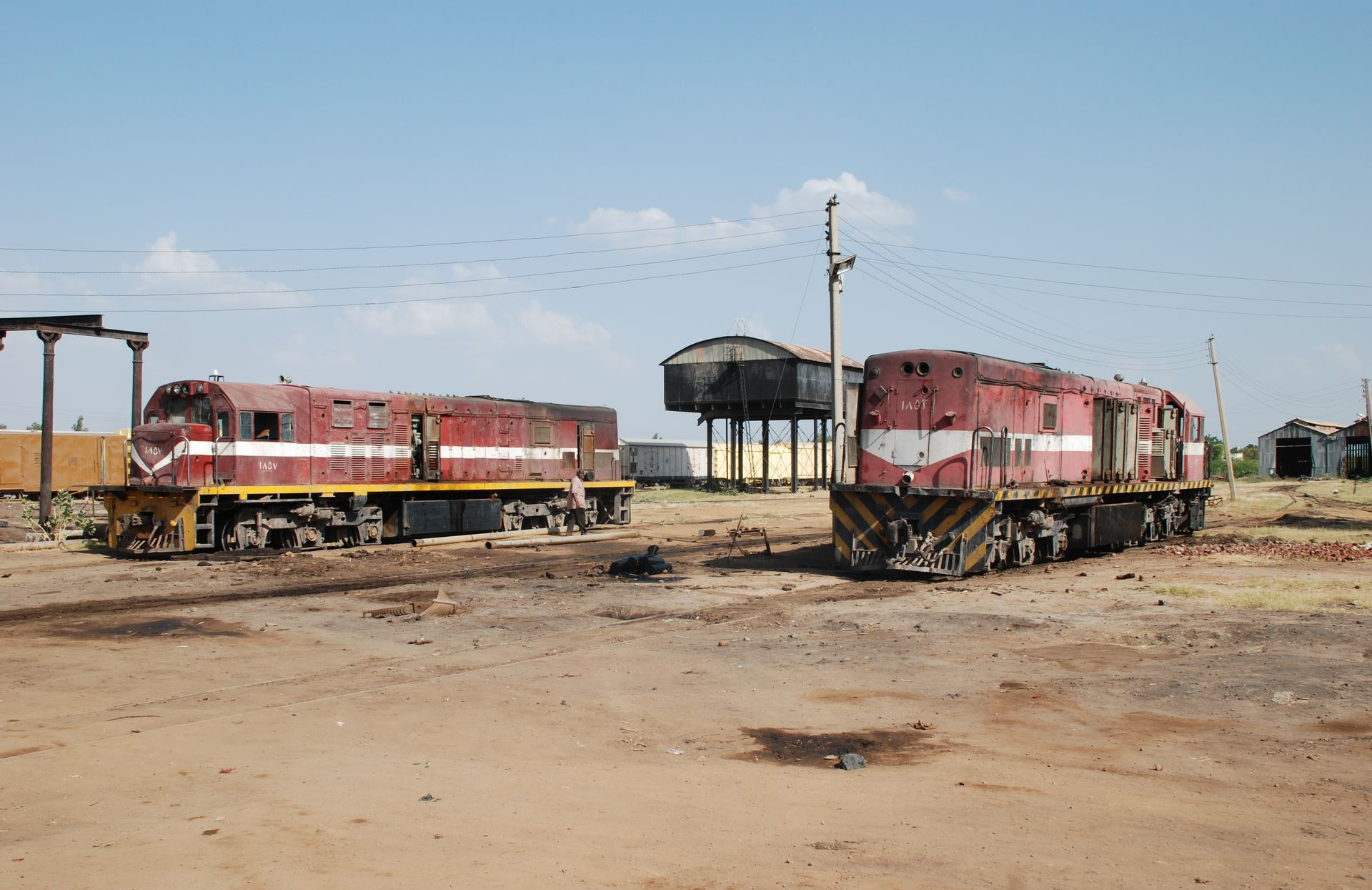
Diesel locomotives at Kosti, Sudan in 2008

In the 1950s Sudan Railways began replacing their steam locomotives with diesel locomotives and by the early 1960s had replaced all of the trains on their main lines. Steam locomotives continued to be used by Sudan Railways on lines with lighter weight rails. A number of South African diesel locomotives are in use in Sudan.

=== Decline ===
Through the 1960s, rail had a practical monopoly on the transportation of goods to and from Sudan. Sudan Railways suffered losses in the early 1970s, though they briefly recovered following the acquisition of new diesel equipment in 1976 further losses occurred in the late 1970s. The losses were attributed to various factors including, inflation, the lack of spare parts, the company's headquarters being located in Atbara rather than in Khartoum, the continuation of certain lines having only light traffic. Hassan Ahmed El Sheikh, a former secretary of a railway union in the Sudan blamed Gaafar Nimeiry's attempts to weaken unions (who had organised numerous strikes on the railway) by firing over 20,000 employees between 1975 and 1991. El Sheikh also blamed Omar al-Bashir who took office in 1989 and continued Nimeiry's anti-union policies. The road system, although generally more expensive, was used increasingly for low-volume, high-value goods because it could deliver more rapidly—2 or 3 days from Port Sudan to Khartoum, compared with 7 or 8 days for express rail freight and up to two weeks for ordinary freight. In 1982, only one to two percent of freight and passenger trains arrived on time. The gradual erosion of freight traffic was evident in the drop from more than 3 million tons carried annually at the beginning of the 1970s to about 2 million tons at the end of the decade. The 1980s also saw a steady erosion of tonnage as a result of a combination of inefficient management, union stubbornness, the failure of agricultural projects to meet production goals, a lack of spare parts and the continuing civil war. The bridge at Aweil was destroyed in the 1980s and Wau was without rail access until 2010 and became part of South Sudan when it declared independence in 2011. During the civil war in the south (1983–2005) military trains went as far as Aweil accompanied by large numbers of troops and militia, causing great disruption to civilians and humanitarian aid organisations along the railway line.

=== Modernisation ===
Efforts were made in the late 1970s and the 1980s to improve through laying heavier rails, repairing locomotives, purchasing new locomotives, modernizing signaling equipment, expanding training facilities, and improving repair facilities. Substantial assistance was given by foreign governments and organizations, including the European Development Fund, the AFESD, the International Development Association, the United Kingdom, France, China and Japan. Implementation of much of this work was hampered by political instability in the 1980s, debt, the lack of hard currency, the shortage of spare parts, and import controls. Rail was estimated in mid-1989 to be operating at less than 20% of capacity. In 2015 the railways were said to have 60 trains available but the maximum speed they could travel was 40 km/h due to poor railway tracks.

In 2015 al-Bashir promised to modernise and upgrade the Sudanese railways with Chinese funds and technical assistance after years of poor administration and neglect. However a 2016 article noted that many Chinese firms had given up dealing with Sudan because of sanctions and pressure from the US.

In 2021 the government put forward a $640m programme to rehabilitate its rail system. The African Development Bank has offered a $75m grant towards the cost while China State Construction Engineering and several Gulf firms are reported to be interested in becoming involved with the project. The first phase of the project will be to carry out $17m of emergency repairs to lines that are in use. The second will be to renew abandoned lines, most of which are in the south of the country.

== Railways ==
=== Gezira Light Railway ===
The Gezira Light Railway, one of the largest light railways in Africa, evolved from tracks laid in the 1920s' construction of the canals for the Gezira Scheme. At the time, rail had about 135 route km of 2 ft (610 mm) narrow gauge track. As the size of the project area increased, the railway was extended and by the mid-1960s consisted of a complex system totalling 716 route km. Its primary purpose has been to serve the farm area by carrying cotton to ginneries and fertilizers, fuel, food, and other supplies to the villages in the area. Operations usually have been suspended during the rainy season.

=== Tokar–Trinkitat Light Railway ===
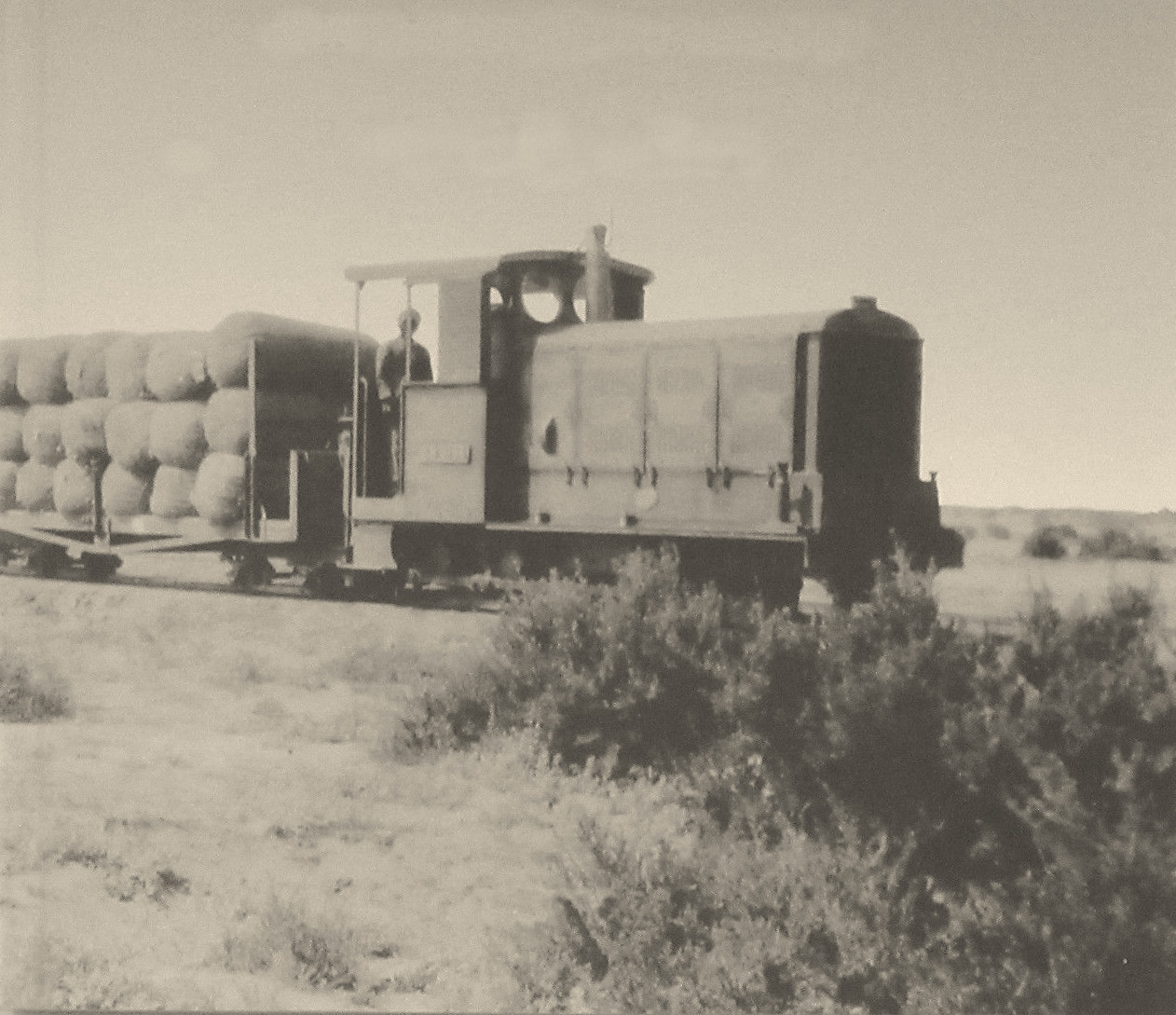
The Tokar–Trinkitat Light Railway

The Tokar–Trinkitat Light Railway was built in 1921 and 1922 at 600 mm (1 ft 11 5/8 in) narrow gauge and was 29 km long, primarily used for the export of the cotton crop from Tokar. It used ex-War Department Light Railways rolling stock and Simplex locomotives. It was absorbed by Sudan Railways in 1933 and closed in 1952.

=== Proposed Nyala–Chad extension ===
In 2011 funds were reportedly obtained to construct an extension from Nyala to Chad with financing to be obtained from China. In 2012 a contract to build a rail line from the Chad–Sudan border to the capital of Chad, N'Djamena was also reported to be signed. But in 2014 it was reported that although Sudan and Chad had agreed to stop supporting rebels in each other's countries, the US$2 billion project had still not been signed nor started.

=== Proposed link to Ethiopia ===
In June 2020 the funding was approved to finance a $3.4m feasibility study into a standard-gauge rail link between Ethiopia and Sudan. Ethiopia is considering a 1,522 km line between Addis Ababa, Khartoum and Port Sudan on the Red Sea. The route has already been agreed by both governments. The two-year study will assess the railway's technical, economic, environmental and social challenges, including the possibility of procuring it as a public–private partnership.

=== Link to Egypt ===
A 250 km/h rail link from the Egyptian city of Aswan to Wadi Halfa in the north has been proposed. The $2.5 million feasibility study was signed with Kuwaiti investment in April 2022, and would include a 6 km bridge across Lake Nasser. A further standard-gauge extension from Halfa to Khartoum has been proposed to give travelers from there a one-seat ride to Alexandria.

== South Sudan independence ==
After the Declaration of Independence of South Sudan in 2011, 248 km of the Babanousa-Wau line was no longer located within Sudan.

== Specifications ==
- Gauge: 3 ft 6 in (1,067 mm)
- Brakes: Air instead of Vacuum
- Couplings: AAR couplers instead of ABC

== Links to neighboring countries ==
- Central African Republic – none
- Chad – planned – line to border from Nyala
- Egypt – planned
- Eritrea – Teseney, Eritrea – discontinued – break of gauge 1067mm/950mm
- Ethiopia – none – proposed standard gauge link
- Libya – none
- South Sudan – via Babanosa to Wau line

== See also ==
- Economy of Sudan
- Transport in Sudan
- Railway stations in Sudan
