= Hayya, Sudan =

Hayya هيا
- Village
- Location in Sudan
- Coordinates: 18°20′46″N 36°23′49″E
- Country: Sudan
- State: Red Sea (state)
- Elevation: 2,172 ft (662 m)

Population
  - Estimate (2011): less than 1,000

Hayya (Arabic: هيا), also Haiya, is a village in the Red Sea State of Sudan. Hayya sits at the point where the railways and the roads which come from Atbara and Kassala, meet, and continue towards Suakin and Port Sudan. It is also a junction station on the mainline of the Sudan railway network.

== See also ==
- Railway stations in Sudan
