= List of railway stations in Egypt =

Railway stations in Egypt include:

== Stations served by passenger trains ==
Station name	Route(s)
10 Ramadan	Ismailiya – Suez
23 Yuliu	Cairo Limun – el-Marg
368 km	Kharga – Luxor; Kharga – Paris Oasis
6 October	6 October – Cairo Ramses
Aamir	Ismailiya – Suez
Ab'adiya	Alexandria – Rosetta
Aba el-Waqf	Cairo Ramses – Minya
Abaza	Cairo Limun – Salihiya; Salihiya – Zaqaziq
Abd el-Qadir	Alexandria – Mersa Matruh
Abis	Alexandria – Damanhur
Abnud	Luxor – Nag'a Hamadi
Abshan	Alexandria – Bayala; Bayala – Damanhur; Cairo Ramses – Shirbeen; Shirbeen – Tanta
Abu el-Khawi	Alexandria – Cairo Ramses
Abu el-Nimrus	Cairo Ramses – Minya
Abu el-Rish (Qibli)	Aswan – Luxor
Abu el-Shuquq	Cairo Limun – Mansura; Cairo Ramses – Mansura
Abu Gareish	Benha – Ismailiya
Abu Ghalib	Alexandria – Cairo Ramses
Abu Ghaneima	Bassili – Qassabi (Bahri)
Abu Halab	Ismailiya – Suez
Abu Hammad	Alexandria – Port Said; Benha – Ismailiya; Cairo Ramses – Ismailiya; Cairo Ramses – Port Said; Cairo Ramses – Suez
Abu Humus	Alexandria – Bayala; Alexandria – Cairo Ramses; Alexandria – Damanhur; Alexandria – Khatatba; Alexandria – Mansura; Alexandria – Port Said; Alexandria – Shirbeen
Abu Kebir	Abu Kebir – Sama'na; Cairo Limun – Mansura; Cairo Limun – Salihiya; Cairo Ramses – Mansura; Salihiya – Zaqaziq
Abu Mashhur	Cairo Ramses – Tanta
Abu Qir	Abu Qir – Alexandria
Abu Qirqas	Asyut – Giza; Asyut – Minya; Cairo Ramses – High Dam; Minya – Sohag
Abur	Abur – Cairo Ain Shams; Cairo Ain Shams – Suez
Abu Ragwan	Cairo Ramses – Minya
Abu Shusha	Nag'a Hamadi – Sohag
Abu Sultan	Ismailiya – Suez
Abu Suweir	Alexandria – Port Said; Benha – Ismailiya; Cairo Ramses – Ismailiya; Cairo Ramses – Port Said; Cairo Ramses – Suez
Abu Tig	Alexandria – High Dam; Alexandria – Luxor; Asyut – Sohag; Cairo Ramses – High Dam; Luxor – Port Said; Minya – Sohag
Abu Tisht	Alexandria – High Dam; Cairo Ramses – High Dam; Nag'a Hamadi – Sohag
Abu Yasin	Cairo Limun – Mansura; Cairo Ramses – Mansura; Salihiya – Zaqaziq
Abu Za'bal el-Balad	Cairo Limun – el-Marg
Abyuha	Asyut – Minya
Adisat	Aswan – Luxor
Ahayiwa	Nag'a Hamadi – Sohag
Ain Ghasein	Ismailiya – Suez
Akhmas	Alexandria – Cairo Ramses
Akyad	Cairo Limun – Salihiya; Salihiya – Zaqaziq
Alexandria	Abu Qir – Alexandria; Alexandria – Bayala; Alexandria – Cairo Furu'a; Alexandria – Cairo Ramses; Alexandria – Damanhur; Alexandria – Damietta; Alexandria – High Dam; Alexandria – Khatatba; Alexandria – Luxor; Alexandria – Mansura; Alexandria – Mersa Matruh; Alexandria – Port Said; Alexandria – Rosetta; Alexandria – Shirbeen
Aliqat	Cairo Limun – el-Marg
Amid	Alexandria – Mersa Matruh
Amiriya	Alexandria – Mersa Matruh
Amrus	Cairo Furu'a – Kafr el-Ziyat
Arab el-Raml	Cairo Ramses – Tanta
Arad	Mersa Matruh – Salloum
Armant	Alexandria – High Dam; Aswan – Luxor; Cairo Ramses – High Dam
Asafira (Alexandria)	Abu Qir – Alexandria; Alexandria – Rosetta
Asafira (Dahqaliya)	Mansura – Matariya
Ashkur	Abu Kebir – Sama'na
Ashma	Cairo Furu'a – Kafr el-Ziyat
Ashmant	Cairo Ramses – Minya
Ashmun	Alexandria – Cairo Furu'a; Cairo Furu'a – Kafr el-Ziyat; Cairo Furu'a – Tanta
Ashmun el-Ramman	Mansura – Matariya
Ashraf	Luxor – Nag'a Hamadi
Ashraf (Qibliya)	Luxor – Nag'a Hamadi
Asirat	Alexandria – High Dam; Cairo Ramses – High Dam; Nag'a Hamadi – Sohag
Aswan	Alexandria – High Dam; Aswan – High Dam; Aswan – Luxor; Cairo Ramses – High Dam
Asyut	Alexandria – High Dam; Alexandria – Luxor; Asyut – Giza; Asyut – Minya; Asyut – Sohag; Cairo Ramses – High Dam; Luxor – Port Said; Minya – Sohag
Atalidim	Asyut – Minya
Atnuh	Alexandria – Mersa Matruh
Atwab	Cairo Ramses – Minya
Atwani	Aswan – Luxor
Awlad Amr	Luxor – Nag'a Hamadi
Awlad Elias	Asyut – Sohag
Awlad Seif	Cairo Limun – Mansura; Cairo Ramses – Mansura
Awseem	Alexandria – Cairo Ramses
Aziziya	Benha – Ismailiya; Cairo Ramses – Damietta; Cairo Ramses – Ismailiya
Ba'alwa	Benha – Ismailiya
Baba	Asyut – Giza; Cairo Ramses – High Dam; Cairo Ramses – Minya
Badawi	Cairo Limun – Mansura; Cairo Ramses – Mansura
Badrasheen	6 October – Cairo Ramses; Asyut – Giza; Cairo Ramses – High Dam; Cairo Ramses – Minya; Fayum – Giza
Baghdad	Kharga – Paris Oasis
Bagur (Minufiya)	Benha – Minuf
Bahgura	Nag'a Hamadi – Sohag
Bahig	Alexandria – Mersa Matruh
Bahit	Cairo Ramses – Minya
Bahut	Shirbeen – Tanta
Bakatush	Bayala – Damanhur; Damanhur – Kafr el-Sheikh; Damanhur – Tanta
Balana	Alexandria – High Dam; Aswan – Luxor; Cairo Ramses – High Dam
Balida	Cairo Ramses – Minya
Balkim	Mit Ghamr – Muhallet Ruh; Muhalla el-Kubra – Santa; Muhallet Ruh – Tanta
Baluza	Bir el-Abd – Ismailiya
Banga	Asyut – Sohag
Baqura	Asyut – Sohag
Barigat	Alexandria – Cairo Ramses
Barqin	Cairo Limun – Mansura; Cairo Ramses – Mansura
Barshant	Cairo Ramses – Minya
Bartus	Alexandria – Cairo Ramses
Basatin Kafr el-Batikh	Damietta – Tanta
Bashtami	Cairo Furu'a – Kafr el-Ziyat
Bashteel	Alexandria – Cairo Ramses
Bashteel el-Balad	Alexandria – Cairo Ramses
Bassili	Alexandria – Rosetta; Bassili – Damanhur; Bassili – Qassabi (Bahri)
Batanun	Alexandria – Cairo Furu'a; Cairo Furu'a – Tanta
Bayala	Alexandria – Bayala; Alexandria – Shirbeen; Bayala – Damanhur; Cairo Ramses – Shirbeen; Shirbeen – Tanta
Bellah	Ismailiya – Port Said
Benha	Alexandria – Cairo Ramses; Alexandria – High Dam; Alexandria – Luxor; Benha – Ismailiya; Benha – Minuf; Cairo Ramses – Damietta; Cairo Ramses – Ismailiya; Cairo Ramses – Kafr el-Sheikh; Cairo Ramses – Mansura; Cairo Ramses – Mersa Matruh; Cairo Ramses – Mit Ghamr; Cairo Ramses – Port Said; Cairo Ramses – Suez; Cairo Ramses – Tanta; Luxor – Port Said
Beni Afan	Beni Suef – Lahun
Beni Ahmed	Asyut – Minya
Beni Bakhit	Beni Suef – Lahun
Beni Hadir	Cairo Ramses – Minya
Beni Hameel	Nag'a Hamadi – Sohag
Beni Harun	Beni Suef – Lahun
Beni Haseen	Asyut – Minya
Beni Mazar	Alexandria – Luxor; Asyut – Giza; Cairo Ramses – High Dam; Cairo Ramses – Minya
Beni Qara	Asyut – Minya; Minya – Sohag
Beni Salama	Alexandria – Cairo Ramses
Beni Shaqir	Asyut – Minya
Beni Suef	Alexandria – High Dam; Alexandria – Luxor; Asyut – Giza; Beni Suef – Lahun; Cairo Ramses – High Dam; Cairo Ramses – Minya; Luxor – Port Said
Bilbeis	Cairo Limun – Mansura; Cairo Limun – Salihiya; Cairo Ramses – Mansura
Bilqas	Alexandria – Shirbeen; Cairo Ramses – Shirbeen; Shirbeen – Tanta
Bilsafura	Nag'a Hamadi – Sohag
Bindar	Nag'a Hamadi – Sohag
Bir Amara	Cairo Limun – Mansura; Cairo Ramses – Mansura
Birdabas	Nag'a Hamadi – Sohag
Birdin	Cairo Limun – Mansura; Cairo Limun – Salihiya; Cairo Ramses – Mansura
Bir el-Abd	Bir el-Abd – Ismailiya
Birgaya	Cairo Ramses – Minya
Birket el-Sab'a	Alexandria – Cairo Ramses; Cairo Ramses – Damietta; Cairo Ramses – Kafr el-Sheikh; Cairo Ramses – Mansura; Cairo Ramses – Tanta
Birqash	Alexandria – Cairo Ramses
Bisandila	Alexandria – Shirbeen; Cairo Ramses – Shirbeen; Shirbeen – Tanta
Bitra	Damietta – Tanta
Boqsa	Cairo Ramses – Mit Ghamr
Buheiret Edku	Alexandria – Rosetta
Bulaq	Kharga – Paris Oasis
Bulaq el-Dukrur	Cairo Ramses – Minya
Bulina	Alexandria – High Dam; Cairo Ramses – High Dam; Nag'a Hamadi – Sohag
Burg el-Arab	Alexandria – Mersa Matruh; Cairo Ramses – Mersa Matruh
Burg Rashid	Alexandria – Rosetta
Cairo Ain Shams	Abur – Cairo Ain Shams; Cairo Ain Shams – Suez
Cairo Furu'a	Alexandria – Cairo Furu'a; Cairo Furu'a – Kafr el-Ziyat; Cairo Furu'a – Qanatir el-Kheiriya Old; Cairo Furu'a – Tanta
Cairo Limun	Cairo Limun – el-Marg; Cairo Limun – Mansura; Cairo Limun – Salihiya
Cairo Ramses	6 October – Cairo Ramses; Alexandria – Cairo Ramses; Alexandria – High Dam; Alexandria – Luxor; Cairo Ramses – Damietta; Cairo Ramses – High Dam; Cairo Ramses – Ismailiya; Cairo Ramses – Kafr el-Sheikh; Cairo Ramses – Mansura; Cairo Ramses – Mersa Matruh; Cairo Ramses – Minya; Cairo Ramses – Mit Ghamr; Cairo Ramses – Port Said; Cairo Ramses – Shirbeen; Cairo Ramses – Suez; Cairo Ramses – Tanta; Luxor – Port Said
Damanhur	Alexandria – Bayala; Alexandria – Cairo Furu'a; Alexandria – Cairo Ramses; Alexandria – Damanhur; Alexandria – Damietta; Alexandria – High Dam; Alexandria – Khatatba; Alexandria – Luxor; Alexandria – Mansura; Alexandria – Port Said; Alexandria – Shirbeen; Bassili – Damanhur; Bayala – Damanhur; Cairo Ramses – Mersa Matruh; Damanhur – Kafr el-Sheikh; Damanhur – Tanta
Damietta	Alexandria – Damietta; Cairo Ramses – Damietta; Damietta – Tanta
Danabiq	Mansura – Matariya
Danasur	Cairo Furu'a – Kafr el-Ziyat
Daqmira	Bayala – Damanhur; Shirbeen – Tanta
Daraw	Alexandria – High Dam; Aswan – Luxor; Cairo Ramses – High Dam
Darb el-Hagg	Cairo Ain Shams – Suez
Dar el-Salam	Mansura – Matariya
Darwa	Cairo Furu'a – Kafr el-Ziyat; Cairo Furu'a – Tanta
Dawayida	Bassili – Qassabi (Bahri)
Defra	Cairo Ramses – Tanta
Deir Muwas	Asyut – Giza; Asyut – Minya; Cairo Ramses – High Dam; Luxor – Port Said; Minya – Sohag
Deirut	Alexandria – Luxor; Asyut – Giza; Asyut – Minya; Cairo Ramses – High Dam; Luxor – Port Said; Minya – Sohag
Desouk	Alexandria – Bayala; Alexandria – Shirbeen; Bassili – Damanhur; Bayala – Damanhur; Damanhur – Kafr el-Sheikh; Damanhur – Tanta
Dikirnis	Mansura – Matariya
Dimlu	Cairo Ramses – Mit Ghamr
Dinsha	Alexandria – High Dam; Cairo Ramses – High Dam; Luxor – Nag'a Hamadi
Dinshal	Damanhur – Tanta
Dinshwai	Cairo Furu'a – Kafr el-Ziyat
Disunis	Alexandria – Damanhur
Diyast	Damietta – Tanta
Doba'a	Alexandria – Mersa Matruh; Cairo Ramses – Mersa Matruh
Doba'iya	Ismailiya – Suez
Dumariya	Aswan – Luxor
Dundit	Tanta – Zaqaziq
Edfu	Alexandria – High Dam; Aswan – Luxor; Cairo Ramses – High Dam
Edku	Alexandria – Rosetta
Ekangi Maryut	Alexandria – Mersa Matruh
el-A'aqab	Aswan – Luxor
el-A'aqab (Qibli)	Aswan – Luxor
el-Adawiya	Cairo Limun – Mansura; Cairo Ramses – Mansura; Salihiya – Zaqaziq
el-Adwa	Fayum – Giza
el-Alamein	Alexandria – Mersa Matruh; Cairo Ramses – Mersa Matruh
el-Aslugi	Cairo Limun – Mansura; Cairo Ramses – Mansura
el-Ayat	Asyut – Giza; Cairo Ramses – High Dam; Cairo Ramses – Minya; Fayum – Giza
el-Ayayisha	Luxor – Nag'a Hamadi
el-Azhar University	Asyut – Minya; Minya – Sohag
el-Baghdadi	Aswan – Luxor
el-Baqaliya	Cairo Limun – Mansura; Cairo Ramses – Mansura
el-Barahima	Luxor – Nag'a Hamadi
El-Batal Selah Salem	Alexandria – Damanhur
el-Bayhu	Cairo Ramses – Minya
El-Beida	Alexandria – Damanhur
el-Beirum	Abu Kebir – Sama'na; Cairo Limun – Salihiya; Salihiya – Zaqaziq
el-Buha	Cairo Limun – Mansura; Cairo Ramses – Mansura
el-Dalgamun	Cairo Furu'a – Kafr el-Ziyat
el-Deir	Aswan – Luxor
el-Eissawiya	Nag'a Hamadi – Sohag
el-Fant	Cairo Ramses – Minya
el-Fashan	Alexandria – Luxor; Asyut – Giza; Cairo Ramses – High Dam; Cairo Ramses – Minya
el-Fedaniya	Abu Kebir – Sama'na; Cairo Limun – Salihiya; Salihiya – Zaqaziq
el-Garaf	Asyut – Minya
el-Ghaba	Abu Kebir – Sama'na; Cairo Limun – Salihiya; Salihiya – Zaqaziq
el-Ghazaza	Cairo Limun – Salihiya; Salihiya – Zaqaziq
el-Hagg Khalil	Damietta – Tanta
el-Iraqiya	Cairo Furu'a – Kafr el-Ziyat
el-Ja'afira	Aswan – Luxor
el-Kab	Ismailiya – Port Said
el-Kartiya	Luxor – Nag'a Hamadi
el-Khawa el-Gedida	Aswan – Luxor
el-Kufur	Cairo Ramses – Minya
el-Kurdi	Mansura – Matariya
el-Mahras	Asyut – Minya
el-Mahsama	Benha – Ismailiya
el-Marg	Cairo Limun – el-Marg
el-Mawda	Cairo Ramses – Minya
el-Mu'asara Idafiya	Beni Suef – Lahun
el-Muhameed	Aswan – Luxor; Cairo Ramses – High Dam
el-Munsha	Alexandria – High Dam; Cairo Ramses – High Dam; Nag'a Hamadi – Sohag
el-Muta'ina	Aswan – Luxor
el-Nasiriya	Fayum – Giza
el-Qawsiya	Asyut – Giza; Asyut – Minya; Cairo Ramses – High Dam; Luxor – Port Said; Minya – Sohag
el-Ragdiya	Damanhur – Tanta; Damietta – Tanta; Shirbeen – Tanta
el-Rahibeen	Damietta – Tanta
el-Rataj	Aswan – Luxor
el-Riyad	Mansura – Matariya
el-Rumadi	Aswan – Luxor
el-Rus	Fayum – Giza
el-Sa'adun	Damietta – Tanta
el-Sabriya	Damietta – Tanta
el-Sidaqa	Aswan – High Dam
el-Simta	Luxor – Nag'a Hamadi
el-Sinballawein	Cairo Limun – Mansura; Cairo Ramses – Mansura
el-Siraj	Aswan – Luxor
el-Suwa	Benha – Ismailiya
el-Suwalim	Damietta – Tanta
el-Tawila	Damietta – Tanta
el-Tina	Ismailiya – Port Said
el-Tud	Aswan – Luxor
el-Warsh	Fayum – Giza
el-Wasifiya	Benha – Ismailiya
el-Wihda	Aswan – Luxor
el-Zahwiyein	Cairo Limun – el-Marg; Cairo Limun – Mansura; Cairo Ramses – Mansura
el-Zariqi	Cairo Limun – Mansura; Cairo Ramses – Mansura
el-Zawiya el-Hamra'	Cairo Limun – el-Marg; Cairo Limun – Mansura; Cairo Limun – Salihiya
Esna	Alexandria – High Dam; Aswan – Luxor; Cairo Ramses – High Dam
Etay el-Barud	Alexandria – Cairo Ramses; Alexandria – Damietta; Alexandria – Khatatba; Alexandria – Mansura; Alexandria – Port Said; Damanhur – Tanta
Ezbet Bulad	Alexandria – Damanhur
Ezbet el-Hattim	Cairo Furu'a – Kafr el-Ziyat
Ezbet Gawda	Damanhur – Tanta; Shirbeen – Tanta
Ezbet Khurshid	Alexandria – Damanhur
Fanara	Ismailiya – Suez
Faqus	Abu Kebir – Sama'na; Cairo Limun – Salihiya; Salihiya – Zaqaziq
Farshut	Alexandria – High Dam; Cairo Ramses – High Dam; Nag'a Hamadi – Sohag
Fatah	Alexandria – Shirbeen; Damanhur – Tanta
Faw	Luxor – Nag'a Hamadi
Fawza	Aswan – Luxor
Fayed	Cairo Ramses – Suez; Ismailiya – Suez
Fayed el-Gedida	Ismailiya – Suez
Fayum	Fayum – Giza
Fayum Municipality	Fayum – Giza
Fazara	Asyut – Minya
Fedaniya	Benha – Ismailiya
Ferdan	Ismailiya – Port Said
Fuka	Alexandria – Mersa Matruh
Fuwa	Bassili – Damanhur
Gabal el-Asfar	Cairo Limun – el-Marg
Gabasat	Alexandria – Mersa Matruh
Gabrial	Abu Qir – Alexandria; Alexandria – Rosetta
Gadidiya	Benha – Ismailiya
Galbana	Bir el-Abd – Ismailiya
Gamagun	Damanhur – Kafr el-Sheikh; Damanhur – Tanta
Gamaliya	Mansura – Matariya
Gamasa	Damietta – Tanta
Gami'a Badr	Cairo Furu'a – Kafr el-Ziyat; Cairo Furu'a – Tanta
Gamiza	Mit Ghamr – Muhallet Ruh; Muhalla el-Kubra – Santa; Muhallet Ruh – Tanta
Ganayin	Ismailiya – Suez
Garawan	Benha – Minuf
Garawela	Alexandria – Mersa Matruh
Gaziriya	Luxor – Nag'a Hamadi
Gebel Awbeid	Cairo Ain Shams – Suez
Gebel el-Gefra	Cairo Ain Shams – Suez
Gelatma	Alexandria – Cairo Ramses
Genifa	Cairo Ramses – Suez; Ismailiya – Suez
Gezira el-Wastaniya	Alexandria – Cairo Ramses
Gharbaniyat	Alexandria – Mersa Matruh
Ghazal	Alexandria – Mersa Matruh; Cairo Ramses – Mersa Matruh
Ghazl el-Muhalla	Damietta – Tanta
Gilal	Alexandria – Mersa Matruh
Girga	Alexandria – High Dam; Alexandria – Luxor; Cairo Ramses – High Dam; Luxor – Port Said; Nag'a Hamadi – Sohag
Giza	6 October – Cairo Ramses; Alexandria – High Dam; Alexandria – Luxor; Asyut – Giza; Cairo Ramses – High Dam; Cairo Ramses – Minya; Fayum – Giza; Luxor – Port Said
Guneinet Gabbari	Alexandria – Mersa Matruh
Habbata	Mersa Matruh – Salloum
Hahya	Cairo Limun – Mansura; Cairo Limun – Salihiya; Cairo Ramses – Mansura; Salihiya – Zaqaziq
Halabi	Tanta – Zaqaziq
Hamadiya	Asyut – Sohag
Hamidiya	Shirbeen – Tanta
Hammad	Bassili – Damanhur; Bassili – Qassabi (Bahri)
Hammam	Alexandria – Mersa Matruh; Cairo Ramses – Mersa Matruh
Hamul	Cairo Furu'a – Tanta
Hariyet Razna	Cairo Limun – Mansura; Cairo Ramses – Mansura; Salihiya – Zaqaziq
Hawamdiya	6 October – Cairo Ramses; Asyut – Giza; Cairo Ramses – High Dam; Cairo Ramses – Minya; Fayum – Giza
Hawariya	Damanhur – Tanta
Hawatika	Asyut – Minya
Hawein	Damanhur – Tanta; Shirbeen – Tanta
Heikel Pasha	Cairo Limun – Mansura; Cairo Ramses – Mansura
Helwasi	Cairo Furu'a – Kafr el-Ziyat; Cairo Furu'a – Tanta
Helwasi el-Balad	Cairo Furu'a – Kafr el-Ziyat; Cairo Furu'a – Tanta
High Dam	Alexandria – High Dam; Aswan – High Dam; Cairo Ramses – High Dam
Hinawi	Shirbeen – Tanta
Hodra	Abu Qir – Alexandria; Alexandria – Damanhur; Alexandria – Mersa Matruh; Alexandria – Rosetta
Ibrahimiya	Damanhur – Tanta; Shirbeen – Tanta
Ibshwai (Gharbiya)	Cairo Ramses – Kafr el-Sheikh; Cairo Ramses – Shirbeen; Damanhur – Tanta; Shirbeen – Tanta
Idfina el-Gedida	Bassili – Damanhur; Bassili – Qassabi (Bahri)
Imbaba	6 October – Cairo Ramses; Alexandria – Cairo Ramses; Cairo Ramses – Minya
Inshas	Cairo Limun – Mansura; Cairo Limun – Salihiya; Cairo Ramses – Mansura
Islah	Abu Qir – Alexandria; Alexandria – Rosetta
Ismailiya	Alexandria – Port Said; Benha – Ismailiya; Bir el-Abd – Ismailiya; Cairo Ramses – Ismailiya; Cairo Ramses – Port Said; Cairo Ramses – Suez; Ismailiya – Port Said; Ismailiya – Suez; Luxor – Port Said
Isma'il Pashi Sidqi	Cairo Ramses – Mit Ghamr
Istanha	Benha – Minuf
Itihad	Alexandria – Cairo Ramses
Itsa	Cairo Ramses – Minya
Ja'afar el-Sadiq	Aswan – Luxor
Jebel el-Salsala	Aswan – Luxor
Jeddah	Kharga – Paris Oasis
Juheina	Cairo Limun – Salihiya; Salihiya – Zaqaziq
Kafr Bata	Benha – Minuf
Kafr Beni Hilal	Damanhur – Tanta
Kafr Bulin	Alexandria – Cairo Ramses
Kafr Dawud	Alexandria – Cairo Ramses
Kafr Deima	Damanhur – Tanta
Kafr el-Arab	Damietta – Tanta
Kafr el-Batikh	Damietta – Tanta
Kafr el-Dabus	Damietta – Tanta
Kafr el-Dawar	Alexandria – Bayala; Alexandria – Cairo Ramses; Alexandria – Damanhur; Alexandria – Damietta; Alexandria – Khatatba; Alexandria – Mansura; Alexandria – Port Said; Alexandria – Shirbeen
Kafr el-Garayida	Alexandria – Shirbeen; Shirbeen – Tanta
Kafr el-Gazayir	Damanhur – Kafr el-Sheikh; Damanhur – Tanta
Kafr el-Hagg Amr	Cairo Limun – Salihiya; Salihiya – Zaqaziq
Kafr el-Hutba	Damietta – Tanta
Kafr el-Ishraf	Tanta – Zaqaziq
Kafr el-Muslimiya	Cairo Limun – Mansura; Cairo Ramses – Mansura; Salihiya – Zaqaziq
Kafr el-Sanabsa	Cairo Furu'a – Kafr el-Ziyat; Cairo Furu'a – Tanta
Kafr el-Sheikh	Alexandria – Bayala; Alexandria – Shirbeen; Bayala – Damanhur; Cairo Ramses – Kafr el-Sheikh; Cairo Ramses – Shirbeen; Damanhur – Kafr el-Sheikh; Shirbeen – Tanta
Kafr el-Shinawi	Shirbeen – Tanta
Kafr el-Wazir	Tanta – Zaqaziq
Kafr el-Ziyat	Alexandria – Cairo Ramses; Alexandria – Damietta; Alexandria – Mansura; Alexandria – Port Said; Cairo Furu'a – Kafr el-Ziyat; Damanhur – Tanta
Kafr Mashla	Cairo Furu'a – Kafr el-Ziyat
Kafr Musa'id	Damanhur – Tanta
Kafr Ramada	Cairo Limun – el-Marg; Cairo Limun – Mansura; Cairo Ramses – Mansura
Kafr Sa'd	Alexandria – Damietta; Cairo Ramses – Damietta; Damietta – Tanta
Kafr Sa'd el-Balad	Damietta – Tanta
Kafr Saqr	Cairo Limun – Mansura; Cairo Ramses – Mansura
Kafr Sarawa	Cairo Furu'a – Kafr el-Ziyat; Cairo Furu'a – Tanta
Kafr Selim	Cairo Furu'a – Tanta
Kafr Shibeen	Cairo Limun – el-Marg; Cairo Limun – Mansura; Cairo Ramses – Mansura
Kafr Shubra Zangi	Benha – Minuf
Kafr Tabluha	Cairo Furu'a – Tanta
Kafr Taha	Cairo Limun – el-Marg; Cairo Limun – Mansura; Cairo Ramses – Mansura
Kafr Ullam	Mansura – Matariya
Kafr Umar	Asyut – Giza; Cairo Ramses – Minya; Fayum – Giza
Kajuj	Aswan – Luxor
Kalabiya	Aswan – Luxor
Kalabsha	Alexandria – High Dam; Aswan – Luxor; Cairo Ramses – High Dam
Kalah	Aswan – Luxor
Kamshush	Cairo Furu'a – Kafr el-Ziyat; Cairo Furu'a – Tanta
Karakat	Bayala – Damanhur; Shirbeen – Tanta
Kasfrit	Ismailiya – Suez
Khanka	Cairo Limun – el-Marg
Kharga	Kharga – Luxor; Kharga – Paris Oasis
Khashashina	Mansura – Matariya
Khatara	Aswan – Luxor
Khatatba	Alexandria – Cairo Ramses
Khazam	Luxor – Nag'a Hamadi
Khazan	Damanhur – Tanta
Kheiriya	Bassili – Qassabi (Bahri)
Khilf Allah	Abu Kebir – Sama'na; Cairo Limun – Salihiya; Salihiya – Zaqaziq
Kilo 11.5	Abur – Cairo Ain Shams
Kilo 13	Abur – Cairo Ain Shams
Kilo 3	Abur – Cairo Ain Shams
Kilo 64	Ismailiya – Suez
Kilo 82.825	Cairo Ain Shams – Suez
Kima	Aswan – High Dam
Kuliya el-Bahriya	Alexandria – Rosetta
Kum Abu Radi	Fayum – Giza
Kum el-Ahmar	Alexandria – Cairo Ramses
Kum el-Higna	Bayala – Damanhur; Shirbeen – Tanta
Kum el-Nur	Tanta – Zaqaziq
Kum el-Tawwil	Alexandria – Bayala; Alexandria – Shirbeen; Bayala – Damanhur; Cairo Ramses – Shirbeen; Shirbeen – Tanta
Kum Halin	Benha – Ismailiya
Kum Hamada	Alexandria – Cairo Ramses
Kum Mazin	Cairo Furu'a – Kafr el-Ziyat
Kum Ombo	Alexandria – High Dam; Aswan – Luxor; Cairo Ramses – High Dam
Lahun	Beni Suef – Lahun
Liwa' Abd el-Sitar	Mit Ghamr – Muhallet Ruh; Tanta – Zaqaziq
Luxor	Alexandria – High Dam; Alexandria – Luxor; Aswan – Luxor; Cairo Ramses – High Dam; Kharga – Luxor; Luxor – Nag'a Hamadi; Luxor – Port Said
Ma'asrat Malawi	Asyut – Minya
Ma'diya	Alexandria – Rosetta
Mahfuza	Shirbeen – Tanta
Mahgar Abu Hammad	Benha – Ismailiya
Mahgub	Beni Suef – Lahun
Makhadima	Luxor – Nag'a Hamadi
Ma'la	Aswan – Luxor
Malatiya	Cairo Ramses – Minya
Malawi	Alexandria – Luxor; Asyut – Giza; Asyut – Minya; Cairo Ramses – High Dam; Luxor – Port Said; Minya – Sohag
Ma'mura	Abu Qir – Alexandria; Alexandria – Rosetta
Manafis	Asyut – Minya
Manashi	Alexandria – Cairo Ramses
Mandara	Abu Qir – Alexandria; Alexandria – Rosetta
Manfalut	Alexandria – Luxor; Asyut – Giza; Asyut – Minya; Cairo Ramses – High Dam; Luxor – Port Said; Minya – Sohag
Manqibad	Asyut – Giza; Asyut – Minya; Cairo Ramses – High Dam; Minya – Sohag
Mansura	Alexandria – Damietta; Alexandria – Mansura; Cairo Limun – Mansura; Cairo Ramses – Damietta; Cairo Ramses – Mansura; Damietta – Tanta; Mansura – Matariya
Mansur Pasha	Cairo Ramses – Mit Ghamr
Manyal	Cairo Ramses – Minya
Manzala	Mansura – Matariya
Maragha	Alexandria – High Dam; Alexandria – Luxor; Asyut – Sohag; Cairo Ramses – High Dam; Luxor – Port Said; Minya – Sohag
Maraziq	Cairo Ramses – Minya; Fayum – Giza
Maryut	Alexandria – Mersa Matruh
Mashla	Cairo Furu'a – Kafr el-Ziyat
Mashta	Asyut – Sohag
Mashtul	Cairo Limun – Mansura; Cairo Limun – Salihiya; Cairo Ramses – Mansura
Masn'a el-Ghazl	Asyut – Minya
Mataniya	Asyut – Giza; Cairo Ramses – Minya; Fayum – Giza
Matar Burg el-Arab	Alexandria – Mersa Matruh
Matar el-Qahira	Abur – Cairo Ain Shams
Matariya	Mansura – Matariya
Matay	Asyut – Giza; Cairo Ramses – High Dam; Cairo Ramses – Minya
Mati'a	Asyut – Sohag
Maymun	Cairo Ramses – Minya
Mazata West	Nag'a Hamadi – Sohag
Mazghuna	Asyut – Giza; Cairo Ramses – Minya; Fayum – Giza
Mazhud	Mersa Matruh – Salloum
Medina	Alexandria – Bayala; Alexandria – Shirbeen; Bayala – Damanhur; Damanhur – Kafr el-Sheikh; Damanhur – Tanta
Mersa Matruh	Alexandria – Mersa Matruh; Cairo Ramses – Mersa Matruh; Mersa Matruh – Salloum
Minuf	Alexandria – Cairo Furu'a; Benha – Minuf; Cairo Furu'a – Kafr el-Ziyat; Cairo Furu'a – Tanta
Minya	Alexandria – High Dam; Alexandria – Luxor; Asyut – Giza; Asyut – Minya; Cairo Ramses – High Dam; Cairo Ramses – Minya; Luxor – Port Said; Minya – Sohag
Minyet el-Bandara	Mit Ghamr – Muhallet Ruh; Muhalla el-Kubra – Santa; Muhallet Ruh – Tanta
Minyet el-Ishraf	Bassili – Damanhur
Minyet el-Qamh	Benha – Ismailiya; Cairo Ramses – Damietta; Cairo Ramses – Ismailiya; Cairo Ramses – Mansura; Cairo Ramses – Port Said; Cairo Ramses – Suez; Luxor – Port Said
Minyet el-Saba'a	Benha – Ismailiya
Minyet Shantana Ayash	Damietta – Tanta; Muhalla el-Kubra – Santa
Mit Aasim	Mansura – Matariya
Mit Abu Arabi	Tanta – Zaqaziq
Mit Antar	Damietta – Tanta
Mit Assas	Damietta – Tanta
Mit Bara	Cairo Ramses – Mit Ghamr
Mit Dafir	Mansura – Matariya
Mit el-Harun	Cairo Ramses – Mit Ghamr
Mit el-Hawfiyein	Cairo Ramses – Mit Ghamr
Mit el-Khuli	Mansura – Matariya
Mit el-Kurma	Damietta – Tanta
Mit el-Qayid	Cairo Ramses – Minya
Mit el-Qurashi	Tanta – Zaqaziq
Mit el-Wasta	Benha – Minuf
Mit Ghamr	Alexandria – Port Said; Cairo Ramses – Mit Ghamr; Mit Ghamr – Muhallet Ruh; Tanta – Zaqaziq
Mit Hadid	Mansura – Matariya
Mit Halfa	Cairo Furu'a – Kafr el-Ziyat; Cairo Furu'a – Qanatir el-Kheiriya Old; Cairo Furu'a – Tanta; Cairo Limun – Mansura; Cairo Ramses – Tanta
Mit Hubeish el-Qibliya	Muhallet Ruh – Tanta; Tanta – Zaqaziq
Mit Khadir	Mansura – Matariya
Mit Khalaf	Damietta – Tanta
Mit Marga Salsil	Mansura – Matariya
Mit Salsil	Mansura – Matariya
Mit Sharaf	Mansura – Matariya
Mit Yazid	Benha – Ismailiya
Miyah	Alexandria – Rosetta
Montaza	Abu Qir – Alexandria; Alexandria – Rosetta
Mu'amal el-Qazzaz	Alexandria – Damanhur
Mu'askar Gala'	Benha – Ismailiya; Ismailiya – Suez
Mudiriyet el-Tahrir	Alexandria – Cairo Ramses
Mughagha	Alexandria – Luxor; Asyut – Giza; Cairo Ramses – High Dam; Cairo Ramses – Minya; Luxor – Port Said
Muhagir Abu Za'bal	Cairo Limun – el-Marg
Muhalafa	Mersa Matruh – Salloum
Muhalla el-Kubra	Alexandria – Damietta; Alexandria – Mansura; Cairo Ramses – Damietta; Cairo Ramses – Mansura; Damietta – Tanta; Muhalla el-Kubra – Santa
Muhallet Abu Ali el-Qantara	Damietta – Tanta
Muhallet Dimna	Mansura – Matariya
Muhallet el-Amir	Bassili – Damanhur; Bassili – Qassabi (Bahri)
Muhallet Malik	Bassili – Damanhur
Muhallet Musa	Alexandria – Shirbeen; Bayala – Damanhur; Cairo Ramses – Kafr el-Sheikh; Cairo Ramses – Shirbeen; Damanhur – Kafr el-Sheikh; Shirbeen – Tanta
Muhallet Ruh	Alexandria – Damietta; Alexandria – Mansura; Cairo Ramses – Damietta; Cairo Ramses – Kafr el-Sheikh; Cairo Ramses – Mansura; Cairo Ramses – Shirbeen; Damanhur – Tanta; Damietta – Tanta; Mit Ghamr – Muhallet Ruh; Muhalla el-Kubra – Santa; Muhallet Ruh – Tanta; Shirbeen – Tanta
Muhallet Sabak	Cairo Furu'a – Kafr el-Ziyat; Cairo Furu'a – Tanta
Muharram Bey	Alexandria – Mersa Matruh; Cairo Ramses – Mersa Matruh
Munsha el-Kubra	Mit Ghamr – Muhallet Ruh; Tanta – Zaqaziq
Munsha el-Sughra	Shirbeen – Tanta
Munshat Abu Riya	Alexandria – Cairo Ramses
Munshat el-Karam	Cairo Limun – Mansura; Cairo Ramses – Mansura
Munshat el-Umra'	Beni Suef – Lahun
Munshiyet el-Amal	Alexandria – Rosetta
Munshiyet el-Badrawi	Shirbeen – Tanta
Munshiyet el-Bakri	Damietta – Tanta; Muhalla el-Kubra – Santa
Munshiyet el-Gabal el-Asfar	Cairo Limun – el-Marg
Munshiyet Sultan	Cairo Furu'a – Kafr el-Ziyat
Muraba'in	Alexandria – Bayala; Alexandria – Shirbeen; Bayala – Damanhur; Cairo Ramses – Shirbeen; Shirbeen – Tanta
Murashida	Luxor – Nag'a Hamadi
Mushayyifa	Mersa Matruh – Salloum
Mustawda'at	Abur – Cairo Ain Shams
Mutras	Alexandria – Mersa Matruh
Mutubis	Bassili – Damanhur; Bassili – Qassabi (Bahri)
Muwasalet el-Maks	Alexandria – Mersa Matruh
Nag'a Abu Sa'id	Aswan – Luxor
Nag'a el-Gusur	Aswan – Luxor
Nag'a Hamadi	Alexandria – High Dam; Alexandria – Luxor; Cairo Ramses – High Dam; Luxor – Nag'a Hamadi; Luxor – Port Said; Nag'a Hamadi – Sohag
Nag'a Sab'a	Asyut – Minya
Nagila	Bir el-Abd – Ismailiya
Nahtai	Mit Ghamr – Muhallet Ruh; Tanta – Zaqaziq
Nakhila	Asyut – Sohag
Nakla	Alexandria – Cairo Ramses
Naqidi	Alexandria – Cairo Ramses
Naqrashi Pasha	Abu Qir – Alexandria; Alexandria – Rosetta
Nashart	Alexandria – Bayala; Alexandria – Shirbeen; Bayala – Damanhur; Cairo Ramses – Kafr el-Sheikh; Cairo Ramses – Shirbeen; Damanhur – Kafr el-Sheikh; Shirbeen – Tanta
Nasir	Asyut – Giza; Cairo Ramses – High Dam; Cairo Ramses – Minya
Nasr el-Thawra	Kharga – Paris Oasis
Nawa	Cairo Limun – el-Marg; Cairo Limun – Mansura; Cairo Ramses – Mansura
Nazlat Shawish	Beni Suef – Lahun
Nazlet Khiyal	Cairo Limun – Mansura; Cairo Ramses – Mansura
Nefisha	Benha – Ismailiya; Ismailiya – Suez
Nifra	Alexandria – Shirbeen; Damanhur – Tanta
Nifya	Cairo Ramses – Tanta
Nukhas	Tanta – Zaqaziq
Palestine	Kharga – Paris Oasis
Paris Junction	Kharga – Luxor; Kharga – Paris Oasis
Paris Oasis	Kharga – Paris Oasis
Phosphate Junction	Aswan – Luxor
Port Said	Alexandria – Port Said; Cairo Ramses – Port Said; Ismailiya – Port Said; Luxor – Port Said
Post 1	Mersa Matruh – Salloum
Post 12	Mersa Matruh – Salloum
Post 16	Mersa Matruh – Salloum
Post 20	Mersa Matruh – Salloum
Post 5	Mersa Matruh – Salloum
Post 8	Mersa Matruh – Salloum
Qaft	Alexandria – High Dam; Cairo Ramses – High Dam; Luxor – Nag'a Hamadi
Qaha	Alexandria – Cairo Ramses; Cairo Ramses – Damietta; Cairo Ramses – Kafr el-Sheikh; Cairo Ramses – Mansura; Cairo Ramses – Mit Ghamr; Cairo Ramses – Port Said; Cairo Ramses – Tanta
Qalaq	Cairo Limun – el-Marg
Qalaq el-Balad	Cairo Limun – el-Marg
Qalishan	Alexandria – Cairo Ramses
Qallin	Alexandria – Bayala; Alexandria – Shirbeen; Bayala – Damanhur; Cairo Ramses – Kafr el-Sheikh; Cairo Ramses – Shirbeen; Damanhur – Kafr el-Sheikh; Damanhur – Tanta; Shirbeen – Tanta
Qallin el-Balad	Cairo Ramses – Kafr el-Sheikh; Cairo Ramses – Shirbeen; Damanhur – Tanta; Shirbeen – Tanta
Qalma	Cairo Ramses – Mit Ghamr; Cairo Ramses – Tanta
Qalyub	Alexandria – Cairo Furu'a; Alexandria – Cairo Ramses; Cairo Furu'a – Kafr el-Ziyat; Cairo Furu'a – Qanatir el-Kheiriya Old; Cairo Furu'a – Tanta; Cairo Limun – el-Marg; Cairo Limun – Mansura; Cairo Limun – Salihiya; Cairo Ramses – Ismailiya; Cairo Ramses – Mansura; Cairo Ramses – Mit Ghamr; Cairo Ramses – Port Said; Cairo Ramses – Tanta
Qalyub el-Balad	Alexandria – Cairo Furu'a; Cairo Furu'a – Kafr el-Ziyat; Cairo Furu'a – Qanatir el-Kheiriya Old; Cairo Furu'a – Tanta
Qanatir el-Kheiriya New	Alexandria – Cairo Furu'a; Cairo Furu'a – Kafr el-Ziyat; Cairo Furu'a – Tanta
Qanatir el-Kheiriya Old	Cairo Furu'a – Qanatir el-Kheiriya Old
Qanawiya	Luxor – Nag'a Hamadi
Qantara East	Bir el-Abd – Ismailiya
Qantara West	Alexandria – Port Said; Cairo Ramses – Port Said; Ismailiya – Port Said; Luxor – Port Said
Qaraqira	Benha – Ismailiya
Qasr Nasr el-Din	Cairo Furu'a – Kafr el-Ziyat
Qassabi (Bahri)	Bassili – Qassabi (Bahri)
Qassabi (Qibli)	Cairo Ramses – Minya
Qassasin	Alexandria – Port Said; Benha – Ismailiya; Cairo Ramses – Ismailiya; Cairo Ramses – Port Said; Cairo Ramses – Suez
Qata	Alexandria – Cairo Ramses
Qata el-Balad	Alexandria – Cairo Ramses
Qaws	Alexandria – High Dam; Cairo Ramses – High Dam; Luxor – Nag'a Hamadi
Qay	Beni Suef – Lahun
Qena	Alexandria – High Dam; Alexandria – Luxor; Cairo Ramses – High Dam; Kharga – Luxor; Luxor – Nag'a Hamadi; Luxor – Port Said
Qibrit	Bassili – Damanhur
Qimmet Fayed	Ismailiya – Suez
Qulusina	Cairo Ramses – Minya
Qumun el-Arus	Cairo Ramses – Minya
Qurashiya	Mit Ghamr – Muhallet Ruh; Muhalla el-Kubra – Santa; Muhallet Ruh – Tanta
Qutur	Cairo Ramses – Kafr el-Sheikh; Cairo Ramses – Shirbeen; Damanhur – Tanta; Shirbeen – Tanta
Quturi	Cairo Ramses – Minya
Qwesna	Alexandria – Cairo Ramses; Cairo Ramses – Damietta; Cairo Ramses – Kafr el-Sheikh; Cairo Ramses – Mansura; Cairo Ramses – Tanta
Rabi'a	Bir el-Abd – Ismailiya
Rabiki	Cairo Ain Shams – Suez
Radasiya	Aswan – Luxor
Rafa'a	Nag'a Hamadi – Sohag
Raghama	Aswan – Luxor
Ragih Island	Aswan – Luxor
Rahmaniya	Alexandria – Bayala; Alexandria – Shirbeen; Bassili – Damanhur; Bayala – Damanhur; Damanhur – Kafr el-Sheikh; Damanhur – Tanta
Rahmaniya (Qibli)	Luxor – Nag'a Hamadi
Raml	Abu Qir – Alexandria; Alexandria – Rosetta
Ramlet el-Ingib	Cairo Furu'a – Kafr el-Ziyat; Cairo Furu'a – Tanta
Ra's el-Ash	Ismailiya – Port Said
Ra's el-Hikma	Alexandria – Mersa Matruh
Ra's el-Khalig	Alexandria – Damietta; Cairo Ramses – Damietta; Damietta – Tanta
Raswa	Ismailiya – Port Said
Riqa	Cairo Ramses – Minya; Fayum – Giza
Rizqet Amai	Shirbeen – Tanta
Rosetta	Alexandria – Rosetta
Rowda	Asyut – Giza; Asyut – Minya; Cairo Ramses – High Dam; Minya – Sohag
Rudwaniya	Aswan – Luxor
Rumana	Bir el-Abd – Ismailiya
Ruweisat	Alexandria – Mersa Matruh
Sa'ada	Bassili – Qassabi (Bahri)
Sa'adina	Abu Kebir – Sama'na
Saba'iya	Alexandria – High Dam; Aswan – Luxor; Cairo Ramses – High Dam
Sabak el-Dohak	Benha – Minuf
Sadas	Cairo Ramses – Minya
Sadfa	Alexandria – High Dam; Alexandria – Luxor; Asyut – Sohag; Cairo Ramses – High Dam; Luxor – Port Said; Minya – Sohag
Sa'd Pasha Zaghlul	Cairo Ramses – Mit Ghamr
Saft el-Anab	Alexandria – Cairo Ramses
Saft el-Hina	Benha – Ismailiya
Saft el-Huriya	Damanhur – Tanta
Saft el-Laban	Cairo Ramses – Minya
Saft Turab	Damietta – Tanta; Muhalla el-Kubra – Santa
Sageen	Cairo Ramses – Kafr el-Sheikh; Cairo Ramses – Shirbeen; Damanhur – Tanta; Shirbeen – Tanta
Sahil (Qibli)	Nag'a Hamadi – Sohag
Sa'idiya	Ismailiya – Suez
Sakha	Alexandria – Bayala; Alexandria – Shirbeen; Bayala – Damanhur; Cairo Ramses – Kafr el-Sheikh; Cairo Ramses – Shirbeen; Damanhur – Kafr el-Sheikh; Shirbeen – Tanta
Salamiya (Qibli)	Luxor – Nag'a Hamadi
Salam (Nubiya)	Aswan – Luxor
Salihiya	Cairo Limun – Salihiya; Salihiya – Zaqaziq
Salimiya Bahri	Bassili – Damanhur
Sallam	Bayala – Damanhur; Shirbeen – Tanta
Sallamun	Mansura – Matariya
Salloum	Mersa Matruh – Salloum
Salmant	Cairo Limun – Mansura; Cairo Ramses – Mansura
Salwa	Aswan – Luxor; Cairo Ramses – High Dam
Samalut	Asyut – Giza; Cairo Ramses – High Dam; Cairo Ramses – Minya
Sama'na	Abu Kebir – Sama'na
Samanud	Alexandria – Damietta; Alexandria – Mansura; Cairo Ramses – Damietta; Cairo Ramses – Mansura; Damietta – Tanta
Samhud	Nag'a Hamadi – Sohag
Sammad Abu Qir	Alexandria – Rosetta
Sammad Talkha	Damietta – Tanta
Sammadun	Cairo Furu'a – Kafr el-Ziyat; Cairo Furu'a – Tanta
Sanbu	Asyut – Minya
Sandanhur	Cairo Ramses – Mit Ghamr; Cairo Ramses – Tanta
Sandub	Cairo Limun – Mansura; Cairo Ramses – Mansura; Mansura – Matariya
Sandyun	Cairo Ramses – Mit Ghamr; Cairo Ramses – Tanta
San George	Cairo Furu'a – Kafr el-Ziyat
Sanhur	Alexandria – Bayala; Alexandria – Shirbeen; Bassili – Damanhur; Bayala – Damanhur; Damanhur – Kafr el-Sheikh; Damanhur – Tanta
Santa	Alexandria – Port Said; Mit Ghamr – Muhallet Ruh; Muhalla el-Kubra – Santa; Muhallet Ruh – Tanta; Tanta – Zaqaziq
Saris al-Layan	Benha – Minuf
Sawami'a	Asyut – Sohag
Sayid Sa'id	Aswan – Luxor
Sayla	Fayum – Giza
Serapeum	Cairo Ramses – Suez; Ismailiya – Suez
Shabanat	Benha – Ismailiya
Shabbas	Alexandria – Bayala; Alexandria – Shirbeen; Bayala – Damanhur; Damanhur – Kafr el-Sheikh; Damanhur – Tanta
Shabshir el-Hissa	Damanhur – Tanta; Damietta – Tanta; Shirbeen – Tanta
Shadida	Aswan – Luxor
Shaghab	Aswan – Luxor
Shaha	Mansura – Matariya
Shahid Abd el-Mun'im Riyad	Abu Kebir – Sama'na
Shahid el-Sayih	Asyut – Sohag
Shalaqan	Cairo Furu'a – Kafr el-Ziyat; Cairo Furu'a – Qanatir el-Kheiriya Old; Cairo Furu'a – Tanta
Shalhi	Mersa Matruh – Salloum
Shalufa	Ismailiya – Suez
Shama	Cairo Furu'a – Kafr el-Ziyat; Cairo Furu'a – Tanta
Shamshira	Bassili – Damanhur
Shanawan	Cairo Furu'a – Tanta
Shandalat	Mit Ghamr – Muhallet Ruh; Muhalla el-Kubra – Santa; Muhallet Ruh – Tanta
Shandawil el-Balad	Asyut – Sohag
Shandawil Island	Asyut – Sohag
Shanhuriya	Luxor – Nag'a Hamadi
Sharahina	Cairo Ramses – Minya
Sharawina	Aswan – Luxor
Sharif Pasha	Cairo Ramses – Minya
Sharshima	Cairo Limun – Mansura; Cairo Ramses – Mansura; Salihiya – Zaqaziq
Shatab	Asyut – Sohag
Shatab el-Balad	Aswan – Luxor
Shatanuf	Cairo Furu'a – Kafr el-Ziyat; Cairo Furu'a – Tanta
Shatura	Asyut – Sohag
Shawa	Cairo Limun – Mansura; Cairo Ramses – Mansura
Sheen	Cairo Ramses – Kafr el-Sheikh; Cairo Ramses – Shirbeen; Damanhur – Tanta; Shirbeen – Tanta
Sheibet el-Nukariya	Tanta – Zaqaziq
Sheikh Amr	Luxor – Nag'a Hamadi
Sheikh Harun	Aswan – High Dam
Sheikh Zayed	Alexandria – Port Said; Cairo Ramses – Port Said; Ismailiya – Port Said
Shibeen el-Kum	Alexandria – Cairo Furu'a; Cairo Furu'a – Tanta
Shibeen el-Kum el-Gadida	Alexandria – Cairo Furu'a; Cairo Furu'a – Tanta
Shibeen el-Qanatir	Cairo Limun – el-Marg; Cairo Limun – Mansura; Cairo Limun – Salihiya; Cairo Ramses – Mansura
Shiblanga	Benha – Ismailiya; Cairo Ramses – Damietta; Cairo Ramses – Ismailiya; Cairo Ramses – Port Said
Shirbeen	Alexandria – Damietta; Alexandria – Shirbeen; Cairo Ramses – Damietta; Cairo Ramses – Shirbeen; Damietta – Tanta; Shirbeen – Tanta
Shirnaqash	Damietta – Tanta
Shubak	Cairo Limun – el-Marg
Shubra Bakhum	Cairo Ramses – Mit Ghamr
Shubra el-Kheima	Alexandria – Cairo Furu'a; Alexandria – Cairo Ramses; Cairo Furu'a – Kafr el-Ziyat; Cairo Furu'a – Qanatir el-Kheiriya Old; Cairo Furu'a – Tanta; Cairo Limun – el-Marg; Cairo Limun – Mansura; Cairo Limun – Salihiya; Cairo Ramses – Damietta; Cairo Ramses – Ismailiya; Cairo Ramses – Kafr el-Sheikh; Cairo Ramses – Mansura; Cairo Ramses – Mit Ghamr; Cairo Ramses – Port Said; Cairo Ramses – Suez; Cairo Ramses – Tanta
Shubra el-Nimla	Damanhur – Tanta
Shubra Qabala	Cairo Limun – Mansura; Cairo Ramses – Mansura
Shubra Qas	Muhallet Ruh – Tanta; Tanta – Zaqaziq
Shuhuda'	Cairo Furu'a – Kafr el-Ziyat
Shuruq	Cairo Ain Shams – Suez
Sidi Abd-el Rahman	Alexandria – Mersa Matruh; Cairo Ramses – Mersa Matruh
Sidi Bashr	Abu Qir – Alexandria; Alexandria – Rosetta
Sidi Gaber	Abu Qir – Alexandria; Alexandria – Bayala; Alexandria – Cairo Furu'a; Alexandria – Cairo Ramses; Alexandria – Damanhur; Alexandria – Damietta; Alexandria – High Dam; Alexandria – Khatatba; Alexandria – Luxor; Alexandria – Mansura; Alexandria – Mersa Matruh; Alexandria – Port Said; Alexandria – Rosetta; Alexandria – Shirbeen
Sidi Ghazi	Alexandria – Bayala; Alexandria – Shirbeen; Bayala – Damanhur; Cairo Ramses – Shirbeen; Shirbeen – Tanta
Sidi Haneish	Alexandria – Mersa Matruh
Sidi Hanush	Alexandria – Mersa Matruh
Sidi Marghab	Alexandria – Mersa Matruh
Sidi Ma'ruf	Bassili – Damanhur
Sidi Shabib	Alexandria – Mersa Matruh
Simla	Alexandria – Mersa Matruh; Mersa Matruh – Salloum
Simlawiya	Mit Ghamr – Muhallet Ruh; Tanta – Zaqaziq
Sohag	Alexandria – High Dam; Alexandria – Luxor; Asyut – Sohag; Cairo Ramses – High Dam; Luxor – Port Said; Minya – Sohag; Nag'a Hamadi – Sohag
Suez	Cairo Ain Shams – Suez; Cairo Ramses – Suez; Ismailiya – Suez
Suq	Abu Qir – Alexandria; Alexandria – Rosetta
Tabiya	Alexandria – Rosetta
Tabiyet el-Agrud	Cairo Ain Shams – Suez
Tafahna el-Azab	Cairo Ramses – Mit Ghamr
Tafahna el-Ishraf	Alexandria – Port Said; Tanta – Zaqaziq
Tafarru'a	Alexandria – Mersa Matruh
Taftish	Mersa Matruh – Salloum
Taha el-Bisha	Cairo Ramses – Minya
Tahanub	Cairo Limun – el-Marg; Cairo Limun – Mansura; Cairo Ramses – Mansura
Tahta	Alexandria – High Dam; Alexandria – Luxor; Asyut – Sohag; Cairo Ramses – High Dam; Luxor – Port Said; Minya – Sohag
Tala	Alexandria – Cairo Furu'a; Cairo Furu'a – Tanta
Talkha	Alexandria – Damietta; Alexandria – Mansura; Cairo Ramses – Damietta; Cairo Ramses – Mansura; Damietta – Tanta
Tama	Alexandria – High Dam; Alexandria – Luxor; Asyut – Sohag; Cairo Ramses – High Dam; Luxor – Port Said; Minya – Sohag
Tanbadi	Cairo Furu'a – Tanta
Tanbusha	Cairo Ramses – Tanta
Tansha	Cairo Ramses – Minya
Tanta	Alexandria – Cairo Furu'a; Alexandria – Cairo Ramses; Alexandria – Damietta; Alexandria – High Dam; Alexandria – Luxor; Alexandria – Mansura; Alexandria – Port Said; Cairo Furu'a – Tanta; Cairo Ramses – Damietta; Cairo Ramses – Kafr el-Sheikh; Cairo Ramses – Mansura; Cairo Ramses – Mersa Matruh; Cairo Ramses – Shirbeen; Cairo Ramses – Tanta; Damanhur – Tanta; Damietta – Tanta; Muhallet Ruh – Tanta; Shirbeen – Tanta; Tanta – Zaqaziq
Tanub	Cairo Furu'a – Kafr el-Ziyat
Taqati'a Idfina	Bassili – Damanhur; Bassili – Qassabi (Bahri)
Tarafaya	6 October – Cairo Ramses; Cairo Ramses – Minya
Tarah	Alexandria – Rosetta
Tayyariya	Alexandria – Cairo Ramses
Tayyariya el-Balad	Alexandria – Cairo Ramses
Tazmant	Cairo Ramses – Minya
Tell el-Amarna	Asyut – Minya
Tell el-Eissa	Alexandria – Mersa Matruh
Tell el-Kebir	Alexandria – Port Said; Benha – Ismailiya; Cairo Ramses – Ismailiya; Cairo Ramses – Port Said; Cairo Ramses – Suez
Tell Rawzin	Cairo Limun – Mansura; Cairo Ramses – Mansura
Tewfiqiya	Alexandria – Cairo Ramses; Damanhur – Tanta
Tewfiqiya el-Balad	Damietta – Tanta
Tukh	Alexandria – Cairo Ramses; Cairo Ramses – Ismailiya; Cairo Ramses – Kafr el-Sheikh; Cairo Ramses – Mansura; Cairo Ramses – Mit Ghamr; Cairo Ramses – Port Said; Cairo Ramses – Tanta
Tukh Tanbusha	Cairo Ramses – Tanta
Tumuh	Cairo Ramses – Minya
Tunab	Aswan – Luxor
Turana	Alexandria – Cairo Ramses
Turanis el-Arab	Cairo Limun – Mansura; Cairo Ramses – Mansura
Umm Dinar	Damanhur – Tanta
Umm el-Zein	Tanta – Zaqaziq
Umm Khanan	Cairo Ramses – Minya
Wadi el-Sil	Cairo Ain Shams – Suez
Wafid	Alexandria – Cairo Ramses
Wardan	Alexandria – Cairo Ramses
Warura	Cairo Ramses – Mit Ghamr
Wasta	Alexandria – Luxor; Asyut – Giza; Cairo Ramses – High Dam; Cairo Ramses – Minya; Fayum – Giza; Luxor – Port Said
Yasiniya	Luxor – Nag'a Hamadi
Zahiriya	Abu Qir – Alexandria; Alexandria – Rosetta
Zankalun	Benha – Ismailiya; Cairo Ramses – Ismailiya
Zaqaziq	Alexandria – Port Said; Benha – Ismailiya; Cairo Limun – Mansura; Cairo Limun – Salihiya; Cairo Ramses – Damietta; Cairo Ramses – Ismailiya; Cairo Ramses – Mansura; Cairo Ramses – Port Said; Cairo Ramses – Suez; Luxor – Port Said; Salihiya – Zaqaziq; Tanta – Zaqaziq
Zara'a	Alexandria – Rosetta
Zat el-Kum	Alexandria – Cairo Ramses
Zawiyet el-Baqli	Cairo Furu'a – Kafr el-Ziyat
Zaytun (Qibli)	Cairo Ramses – Minya
Zifta	Alexandria – Port Said; Cairo Ramses – Mit Ghamr; Mit Ghamr – Muhallet Ruh; Tanta – Zaqaziq
Zuyur	Mersa Matruh – Salloum

== Stations served ==
=== Existing ===
Most major lines originate from Ramses Station, Cairo or Misr Station, Alexandria:

- Giza
  - Luxor
  - Edfu
  - Aswan
  - Shellal
- Port Said
- Suez
- Damietta
- El Alamein
  - Marsa Matruh

=== Proposed ===
- In 2010, a road/rail tunnel under the Suez Canal was proposed.
- In 2014, the following 80 km long double track 25 kV line was proposed:
- El Salem
- Bilbeis City
- Sharqeya

=== Possible ===
- Hurghada (Red sea)
- Safaga
- to Luxor

- Sadat City
- Cairo

- Aswan
- Marsa Alam

=== Ferry ===
A weekly ferry service on the Nile River connects the Egyptian railhead at Aswan with the Sudan railhead at Wadi Halfa. This link is said to be replaced by a standard gauge railway.

== See also ==
- Egyptian National Railways
- Egypt-Sudan Railway Committee
