= El Jebelein =

El Jebelein الجبلين Al Jabalayn
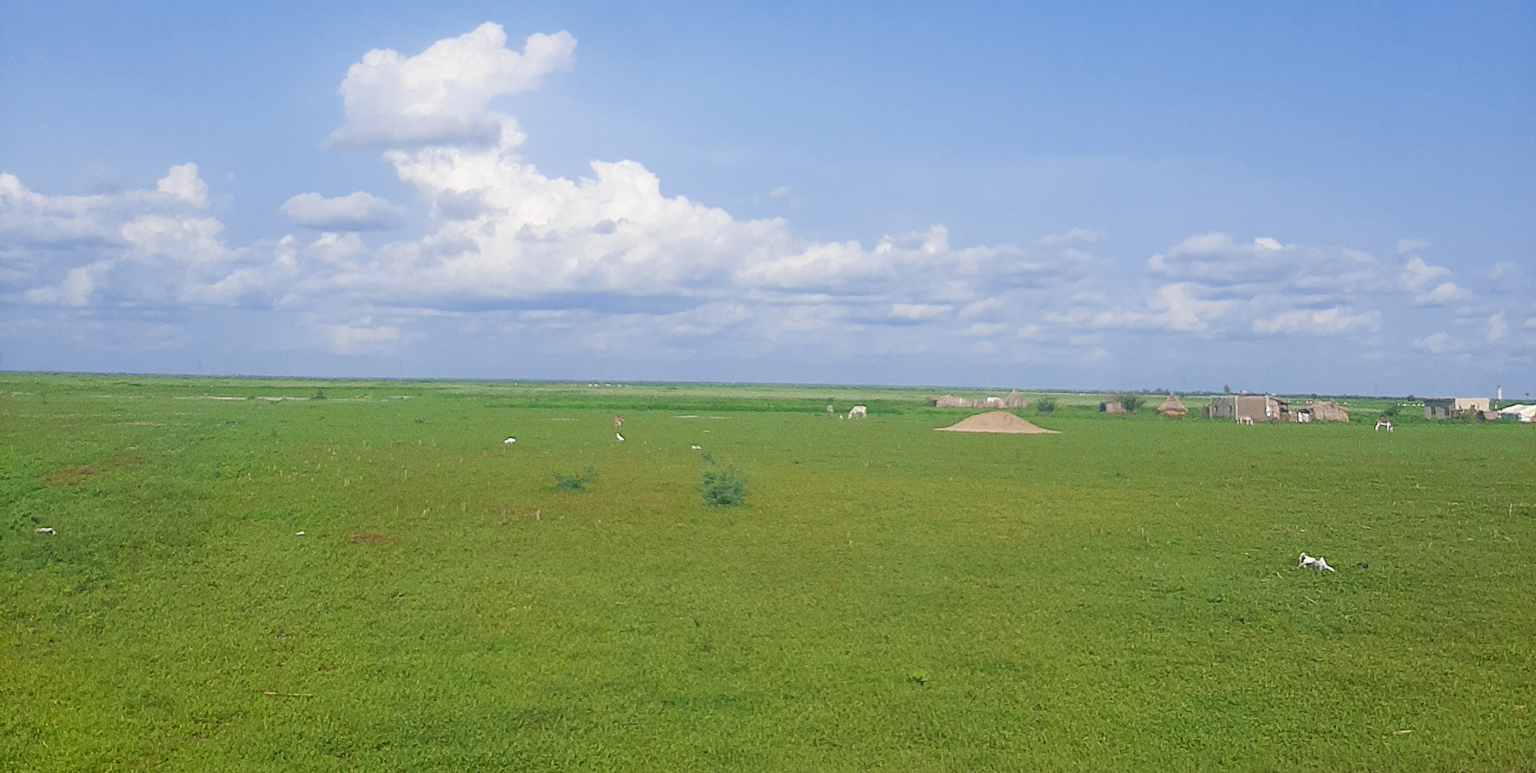

- Location in Sudan
- Coordinates: 12°35′07″N 32°48′26″E
- Country: Sudan
- State: White Nile State
- District: Al Jabalian
- Elevation: 1,250 ft (380 m)

Population
  - Ethnicities: Shilluk Collo

El Jebelein (Arabic: الجبلين), also known as Al Jabalayn, is a town in central Sudan on the east bank of the River Nile.

== History ==
The town was once part of the Shilluk Kingdom, which existed on the White Nile and was associated with the native Shilluk people of the region. Many inhabitants worked in agriculture because of the town's proximity to the White Nile.

From 28 to 29 December 1989, the El Jebelein massacre took place in the settlement, targeting Shilluk laborers. Government estimates placed the death toll at 150 to 250, while local sources estimated that about 1,500 civilians were killed.

From 2 to 3 December 2024, approximately 3,069 households were displaced from six villages in and near El Jebelein because of attacks carried out by the RSF on the locality.

On 1 April 2026, during the Sudanese civil war, two drone strikes carried out by the RSF targeted El Jebelein hospital, killing 7 to 12 people, including seven doctors. Twenty-two people were injured in the attack. It occurred a day after another airstrike that targeted a medicine warehouse in White Nile State wounded three people, including a pharmacist. The Muslim World League strongly condemned the strike on the medical facility, saying it was "a serious violation of all religious values, and international and humanitarian laws and norms." The Sudanese Ministry of Foreign Affairs also denounced the strike, describing it as a "heinous crime" that violated humanitarian laws and norms.

== Infrastructure ==
It was served by a branch of Sudan Railways from 1943 to 1950.

The El Jebelain station in the town is part of the oil transport infrastructure connecting oil fields in Upper Nile State, South Sudan, with the crude oil export terminal at the Marsa Bashayer Port on the Red Sea, south of Port Sudan. In November 2025, the station was struck by drones and missiles launched by RSF forces, resulting in the destruction of facilities at the site. Four of the drone strikes targeted the oil pumping station of the area, killing one engineer who was working at the site and injuring four others. The Bashayer Pipeline Company ordered an emergency shutdown of the site. Its director, Mohamed Awad, sent a letter to senior officials in the Ministry of Oil and the South Sudan Oil Company regarding the incident.

== See also ==
- Rabak
- Railway stations in Sudan
- Second Sudanese Civil War
