= List of companies of Djibouti =

Location of Djibouti (in red)

Djibouti, officially the Republic of Djibouti, is a country located in the Horn of Africa. Djibouti's economy is largely concentrated in the service sector. Commercial activities revolve around the country's free trade policies and strategic location as a Red Sea transit point. Due to limited rainfall, vegetables and fruits serve as the principal production crops, and other food items require importation. The gross domestic product in 2012 was estimated at $2.377 billion, with a real growth rate of 4.8% annually. Per capita income was around $2,700.

== Notable firms ==
This list includes notable companies with primary headquarters located in the country. The industry and sector follow the Industry Classification Benchmark taxonomy. Organizations which have ceased operations are included and noted as defunct.

Notable companies Status: P=Private, S=State; A=Active, D=Defunct
Name	Industry	Sector	Headquarters	Founded	Notes	Status	
Air Djibouti	Consumer services	Airlines	Djibouti City	1963	Airline	P	A
Al Gamil	Industrials	Heavy construction	Djibouti City	2001	Construction	P	A
Banque Indosuez Mer Rouge	Financials	Banks	Djibouti City	1908	Part of Crédit Agricole (France)	P	A
Banque pour le Commerce et l'Industrie – Mer Rouge	Financials	Banks	Djibouti City	1943	Part of Groupe Banque Populaire (France)	P	A
Central Bank of Djibouti	Financials	Banks	Djibouti City	1949	Bank	S	A
Dahabshil Bank International	Financials	Banks	Djibouti City	2014	Bank	P	A
Djibouti Air	Consumer services	Airlines	Djibouti City	2011	Airline	P	A
Djibouti Airlines	Consumer services	Airlines	Djibouti City	1996	Airline, defunct 2009	P	D
Djibouti Telecom	Telecommunications	Fixed line telecommunications	Djibouti City	1997	Telecom	S	A
Ethio-Djibouti Railways	Industrials	Railroads	Djibouti City	1901	Railway	P	A
Puntavia	Consumer services	Airlines	Djibouti City	1991	Airline, defunct 1996	P	D
Silver Air	Consumer services	Airlines	Djibouti City	2004	Airline, defunct 2009	P	D

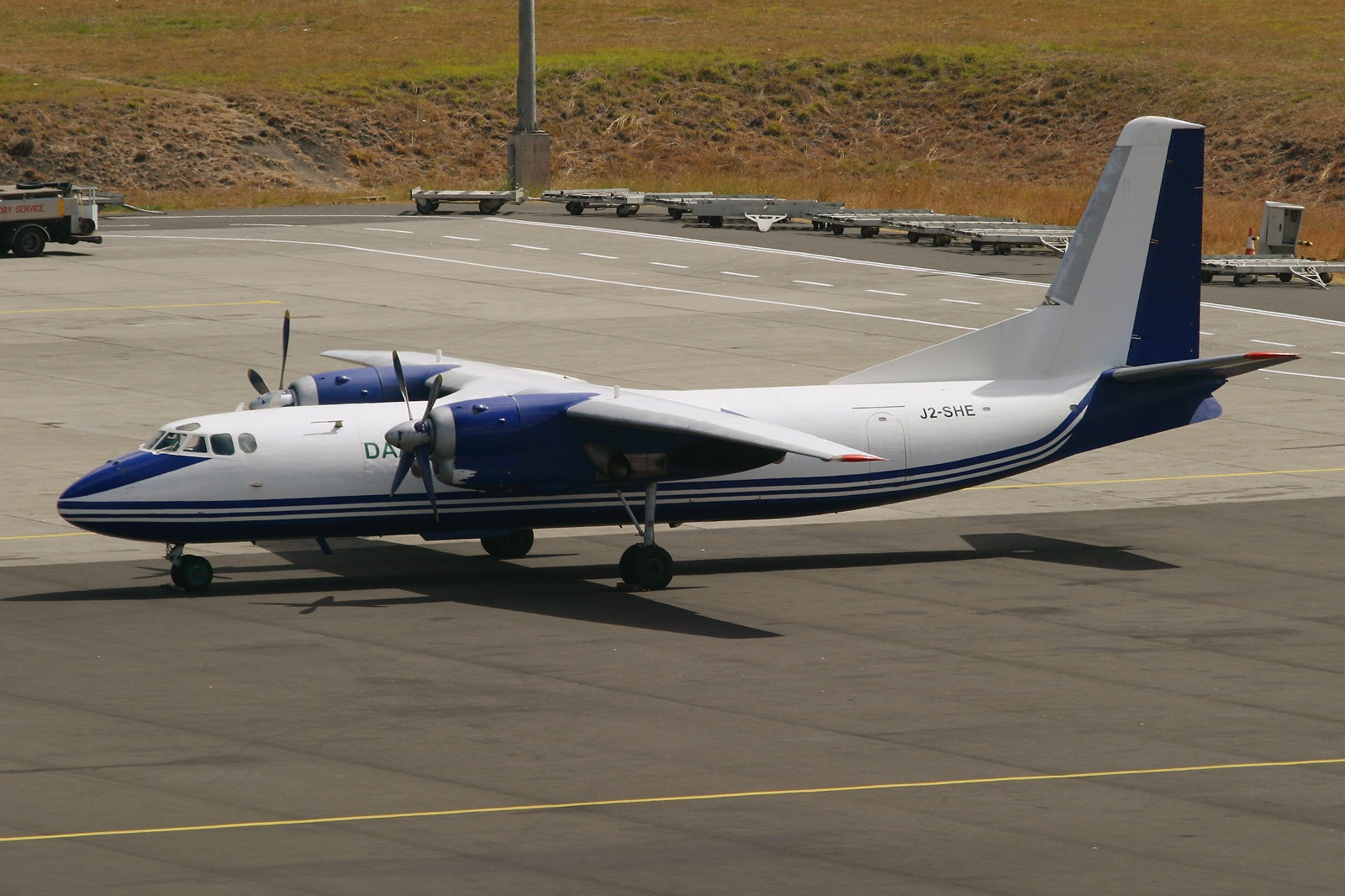
A Daallo Airlines Antonov An-24RV aircraft at the Addis Ababa Bole International Airport

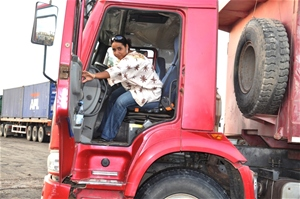
A truck operator at Al Gamil, the largest construction company in Djibouti.

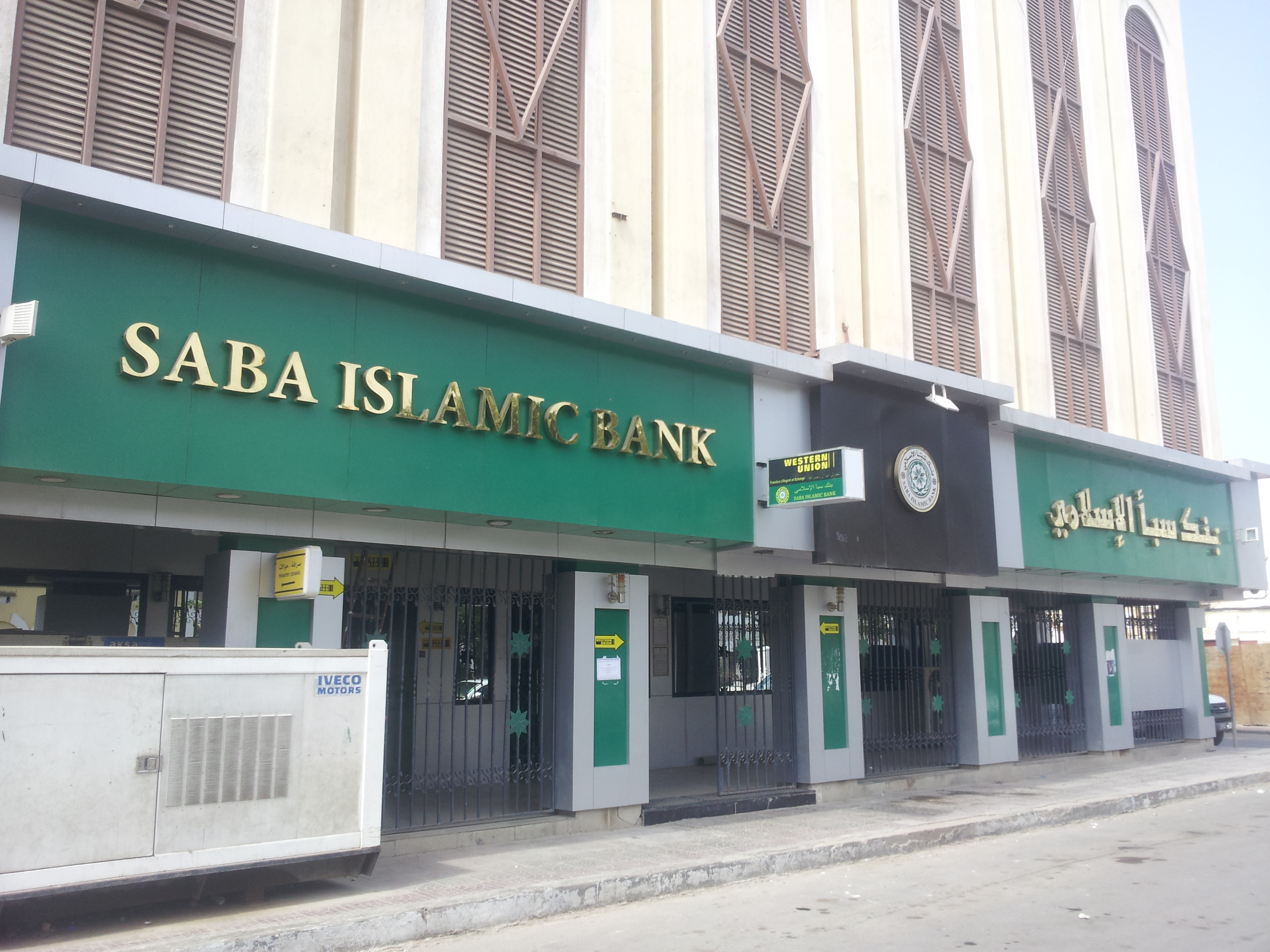
A Saba Islamic Bank branch in Djibouti City

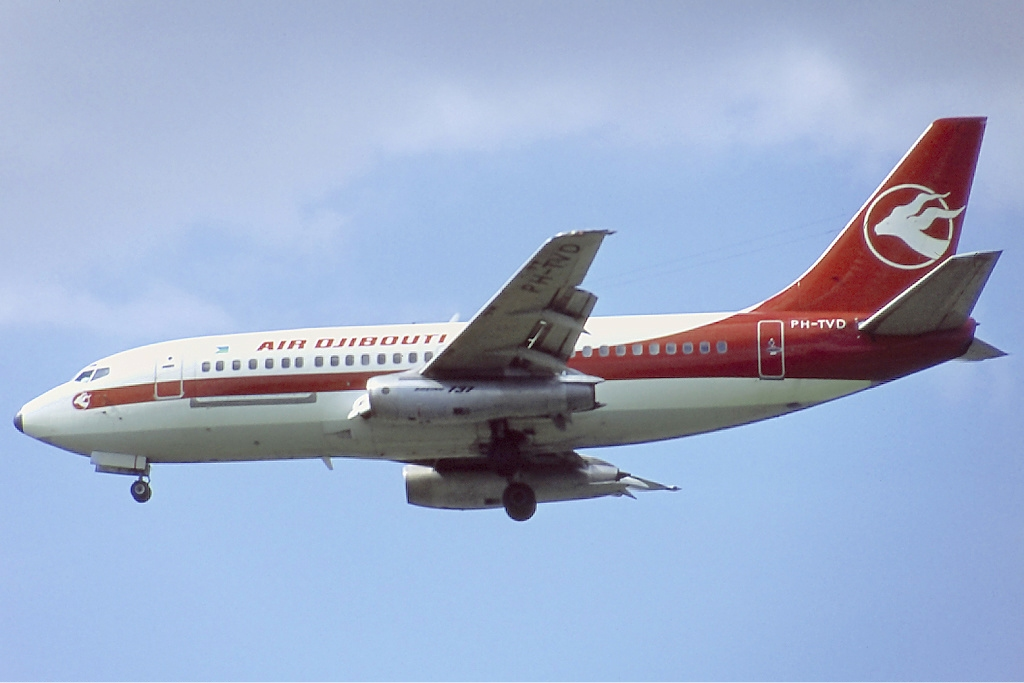
An Air Djibouti Boeing 737-200 in 1980.

== See also ==
- Economy of Djibouti
- List of airlines of Djibouti
- List of banks in Djibouti
