= Foreign military bases in Djibouti =

Foreign military bases in Djibouti refer to military installations operated by foreign states in the country of Djibouti. The country's position at the Bab el-Mandeb Strait, a maritime gateway between the Red Sea and the Gulf of Aden, has made it a strategic location for global shipping and military activity.

The United States, China, France, Japan, and Italy all operate military facilities near the capital Djibouti City. These bases are used to conduct operations ranging from anti-piracy, counterterrorism, and intelligence gathering to non-combatant evacuation operations and peacekeeping support.

France has maintained military bases since Djibouti was a French colony, while the United States has operated military bases there since the attacks of September 11th. The other military bases were built due to the geographical location near the Bab el-Mandeb Strait. In recent years, Djibouti is allowing Saudi Arabia to install military facilities. This is because of the cultural and diplomatic ties between them.

== Overview of foreign military bases ==
Foreign military bases in Djibouti

=== Current operational bases ===
- People's Liberation Army Support Base (China)
- Base Aérienne 188 (France)
- Heron Naval Base (France)
- Japan Self-Defense Force Base Djibouti (Japan)
- Base Militare Nazionale Amedeo Guillet (Italy)
- Camp Lemonnier (United States)
- Chabelley Military Airport (United States)

=== Planned bases ===
- Proposed military base by Saudi Arabia

== History ==
Djibouti's role as host for foreign military bases dates back to its colonial era, as French Somaliland. In 1957, France established a major military facility (later known as Base Aérienne 188) in Djibouti, which became one of France's largest foreign bases. When Djibouti gained independence in 1977, France retained a strong military presence under defense agreements, with initially around 4,000 troops garrisoned to ensure security of the newly independent state. Throughout the 1980s and 1990s, France remained the only foreign power with a base in Djibouti, though its troop levels gradually declined after the end of the Cold War (to about 1,450 by 2021).

Following the September 11, 2001 attacks, Djibouti's strategic importance surged as the United States invasion of Afghanistan and other "war on terror" action began. In late 2001, the United States negotiated access to French facilities and established Camp Lemonnier in Djibouti, a permanent U.S. base in Africa. Camp Lemonnier was operational just months after 9/11 and was chosen because there were fears that Al-Qaeda terrorists might wish to cross the Indian Ocean to East Africa. The U.S. base became a critical hub for counterterrorism, including operations against al-Qaeda and al-Shabab militants in the region.

Djibouti's strategic location also made it a center for international anti-piracy efforts in the mid-2000s, as piracy off Somalia increased and threatened the global shipping lanes. The European Union, United States and other coalitions launched naval patrols out of Djibouti, most notably the Combined Task Force 151, and Djibouti began hosting contingents from several nations on a more transient basis for maritime security missions.

The 2010s saw a further expansion of foreign military presence. In 2011, Japan opened its first ever overseas base in Djibouti. In 2013, Italy inaugurated its own support base (Base Militare Nazionale "Amedeo Guillet") near Djibouti city, to back its East African operations and anti-piracy deployment. In 2014 the U.S. secured a long-term extension of its lease at Camp Lemonnier.

After decades of hosting mostly Western military forces, Djibouti entered negotiations in 2015 with the China and reached consensus on the construction of a Chinese naval facility. A formal Djibouti–China strategic partnership was announced in 2017, further paving the way for China's first overseas military base, which opened later that year. This development coincided with Djibouti’s integration into China's Belt and Road Initiative, where Djibouti is listed as a key maritime node.

Growing instability in the Middle East, especially the Yemen civil war across the Red Sea, prompted interest from Gulf states, and in 2017 Djibouti signed agreements with Saudi Arabia to build a military base in the country. Russia has also reportedly approached Djibouti to establish a naval base, however the Djiboutian government declined the proposal, reportedly due to concerns from Western powers.

In 2016, the African Union cautioned its member states about the risks of hosting foreign military facilities. Djibouti's government, however, has continued to leverage its geostrategic location as a commodity. Experts have described President Ismaïl Omar Guelleh's strategy as one of welcoming multiple powers to ensure security guarantees and economic rent, and that Djibouti's strategy has contributed to its role as a focal point of great-power competition in the Horn of Africa

The 2020s have seen increasing competition among regional and extra-regional powers to develop military ports around the Red Sea, including Berbera in Somaliland and Bosaso in Puntland. Recent security challenges in the region, including attacks on commercial vessels in the Red Sea by Houthi forces and renewed incidents of piracy off the coast of Somalia, have cemented Djibouti's role in the international efforts to safeguard the maritime routes in the Bab el-Mandeb Strait . Recently, heightened tensions in the Middle East, including developments in the Arab–Israeli conflict, have led to further geopolitical interest in the Horn of Africa due to its access to both the Red Sea and the broader Indo-Pacific region.

== Economic rent and benefits ==
As a country with scarce natural resources, Djibouti has instead capitalized on its location by leasing access to its territory for foreign military use. Hosting foreign bases has become a major source of revenue and investment for Djibouti's economy. Aside from the boost to the local economy through foreign military troops' expenditures, the government also earns leasing fees and related economic support from each country with a military presence. It is estimated that base hosting agreements generate around $300 million per year, roughly 10% of Djibouti's GDP. The United States pays an annual rent of approximately $63–70 million for Camp Lemonnier under a 2014 agreement. Japan invested about $30 million to build its Self-Defense Force base, alongside development aid to Djibouti.

China's annual costs have been estimated to be US$94 million and have also involved infrastructure investments, such as a $580 million multipurpose port and a $4 billion railway. France, historically, provides financial aid and defense guarantees in exchange for its presence, and contributes with training of local forces.

The strategic rent from foreign bases has increased Djibouti's state revenue and funded improvements in infrastructure, particularly port and airport facilities. Since the early 2000s, Djibouti's per capita income has quadrupled as foreign military spending and related investments have poured in.

International observers and analysts have noted that most ordinary Djiboutians see limited trickle-down benefits from the foreign military rents. Djibouti continues to face high levels of poverty and unemployment, and access to essential services such as water, electricity, education, and healthcare remain limited. Much of the revenue is reported to flow to the state and elite-controlled sectors, such as the ports authority managed by relatives of the president.

Djibouti's external public debt has grown alongside Chinese-funded projects, reaching over 70% of GDP by 2020, with China as the largest creditor. Djibouti's growing debt has led to warnings about dependency on great powers. Analysts have cautioned that relying heavily on military rent is not a sustainable long-term strategy and have emphasized the need for Djibouti to engage in economic diversification.

== Implications for regional security ==
The concentration of foreign military bases in Djibouti has had implications for both Djibouti and the wider Horn of Africa region. It has made Djibouti into a crucial node for international security operations, including counter-piracy patrols in the Gulf of Aden and Red Sea, humanitarian assistance missions, peacekeeping support, counterterrorism operations as well as intelligence, surveillance, and reconnaissance activities throughout East Africa and the Arabian Peninsula.

The close proximity of numerous foreign military bases have raised concerns over increased geopolitical tension and of Djibouti turning into a theater of great-power competition. Djibouti is currently the only place where military forces of the United States, China, Japan, and several European nations all operate in close proximity. Western powers, particularly the United States and Japan, have expressed unease over China's presence. The proximity of China's People's Liberation Army Support Base to the U.S.'s Camp Lemonnier has sparked American concerns over potential espionage and interference with American operations. Djibouti's President Ismaïl Omar Guelleh has publicly defended Djibouti's decision to host multiple partners and stated that concerns about the Chinese presence were exaggerated.

In 2016, the African Union's Peace and Security Council recommended that African states be cautious in allowing foreign militaries, warning that it could entangle the continent in external rivalries.

In 2018, the United States accused China of directing its lasers towards a Lockheed C-130 which reportedly resulted in minor injuries to two U.S. pilots.
