= List of banks in Somalia =

This is a list of commercial banks in Somalia, as updated in late 2024 by the Central Bank of Somalia.

== List of commercial banks ==
- Mybank Limited
- Agro Africa Bank
- Amal Bank
- Amana Bank
- Bushra Business Bank
- Dahabshil Bank International
- Daryeel Bank Ltd
- Galaxy International Bank
- Idman Community Bank
- International Bank of Somalia
- Premier Bank
- Salaam Somali Bank
- SomBank Ltd

== See also ==
- Dara-Salaam Bank and Dahabshil Bank International, both in Somaliland
- List of banks in Africa
- List of banks in the Arab world
- Central Bank of Somalia
- Economy of Somalia
