= List of defunct airlines of Djibouti =

This is a list of defunct airlines of Djibouti.

Airline	IATA	ICAO	Callsign	Image	Commenced operations	Ceased operations	Notes
Air Djibouti (1972)	DJ	DJI	Red Sea AL		1972	1991	
Bab-el-Mandeb Airlines					1978	1979	
Djibouti Air	DZ				2011	2012	
Puntavia Airline de Djibouti		PTV	Bin Mahfooz Avn		1991	1996	
Silver Air (Djibouti)		SVJ			2004	2009	
Warsan Airlines					2014		

== See also ==
- List of airlines of Djibouti
- List of airports in Djibouti
