= Silver Air =

Silver Air may refer to:

- Silver Air (Czech Republic), a Czech Airline headquartered in Prague
- Silver Air (Djibouti), a defunct charter airline based out of Djibouti
- Silver Air (US), a private jet management and charter company based out of Santa Barbara, California
- Silver Airways, a United States regional airline based at Fort Lauderdale–Hollywood International Airport in Florida which ceased operations in 2025
