= List of airlines of Djibouti =

This is a list of airlines currently operating in Djibouti. All airlines are currently on the List of airlines banned in the EU.

Airline	IATA	ICAO	Callsign	Image	Commenced operations	Notes
Air Djibouti	DY	DJU	AIR DJIB		1963	
Daallo Airlines	D3	DAO	DALO AIRLINES		1991	Headquarters in Jebel Ali Free Zone

== See also ==
- List of airlines
- List of air carriers banned in the European Union
- List of defunct airlines of Djibouti
- List of companies based in Djibouti
