= List of banks in Somaliland =

This is a list of commercial banks in Somaliland;

- Bank of Somaliland
- Dahabshiil Bank
- Darasalaam Bank
- Premier Bank
- Amal Bank
- IBS Bank

== See also ==
- List of banks in Africa
