= Japan Self-Defense Force Base Djibouti =

Japan's first overseas military base

Japan Self-Defense Force Base Djibouti
- Djibouti
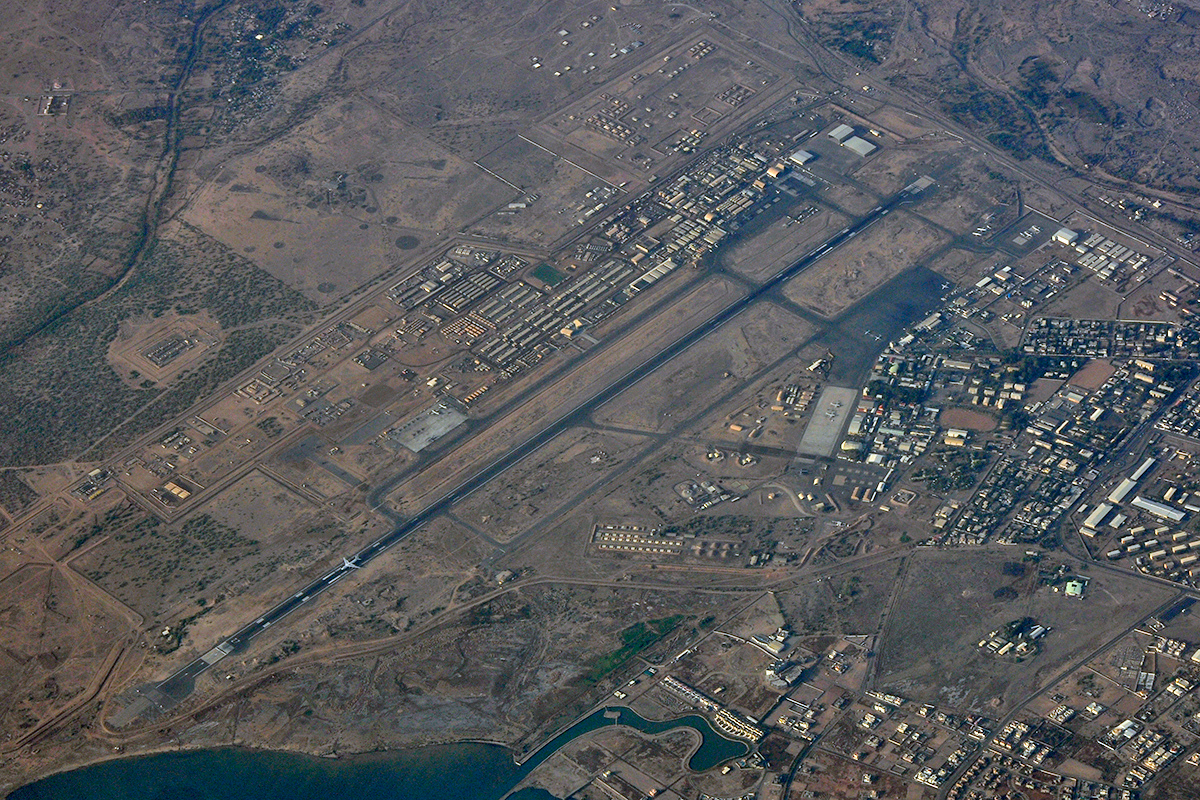

Site information
- Type: Japan Self-Defense Force Base
- Owner: Japan Self-Defense Force

Location
- Coordinates: 11.553109°N 43.1442278°E

Site history
- Built: 2011

Garrison information
- Garrison: 600 soldiers (2016)

The Japan Self-Defense Force Base Djibouti (Japanese: ジブチ共和国における自衛隊拠点, Hepburn: Jibuchi Kyouwakoku ni okeru Jieitai Kyoten) is a military base operated by the Japan Self-Defense Forces (JSDF) located in Ambouli, Djibouti alongside the Djibouti–Ambouli International Airport.

It is the JSDF's first full-scale, long-term overseas base. As of 2025, Colonel Fumihito Tanaka is the base commander/Deployment Support-Group for Counter Piracy Enforcement in Djibouti commander.

== Background ==
Since their establishment in the 1950s following World War II, Japan's Self-Defense Forces have concerned themselves only with defense of the home islands. In the 1990s, JSDF contingents were dispatched to Cambodia under the UN and to Iraq to aid in reconstruction efforts. These were relatively short-term missions and used temporary bases.

Throughout 2009, in response to piracy off the coast of Somalia members of the European Union, North Atlantic Treaty Organization and other countries including Japan, China, Australia, and many others deployed personnel, air and naval resources as part of global anti-piracy measures. In July 2009, the National Diet passed the "Anti-piracy measures law".

From March 2009, the Japan Maritime Self-Defense Force (JMSDF) deployed the destroyers JS Sazanami and JS Samidare. The JMSDF also deployed two P-3 Orion patrol aircraft to Djibouti, which began patrols on June 11, 2009. From 2009 to 2011, the aircraft operated from Camp Lemonnier, which is run by the United States Navy.

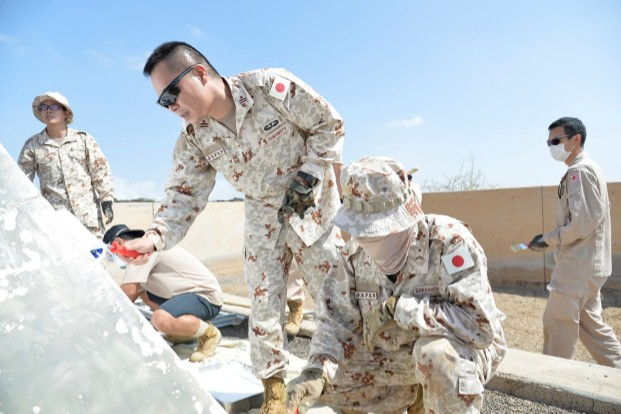
JGSDF soldiers conducting maintenance work in Djibouti.

== History ==
On April 3, 2009, then Japanese Foreign Minister Hirofumi Nakasone and Djiboutian Foreign Minister Mahamoud Ali Youssouf signed a letter on the legal and official status of JSDF troops in Djibouti operating in the area for anti-piracy operations.

In March 2011, the JMSDF established its own base nearby with 180 troops deployed there on a four-month rotational basis, with a command headquarters, boarding facilities and parking apron, at a cost of ¥4.7 billion yen (US$40 million).

In 2015, two of the JMSDF's new Kawasaki P-1 patrol aircraft deployed to the base, to continue with operational trials within tropical and desert climates.

Three Lockheed C-130H Hercules aircraft of the Japan Air Self-Defense Force's 401st Tactical Airlift Squadron were sent to the base in July 2016 to evacuate Japanese citizens from Juba in South Sudan after fighting broke out there. They were expected to pick up around 70 Japanese citizens.

In August 2016, Tomomi Inada, the then Japanese Minister of Defense, visited the base.

In November 2016, it was announced that the Japanese government was considering expanding the 12-hectare (30-acre) site by leasing more land to the east. It was considering deploying C-130 Hercules aircraft and Bushmaster armoured vehicles. This was reportedly so that Japan could more easily rescue Japanese citizens in Africa.

From September 25 to October 2, 2017, the SDF conducted a drill in Djibouti to practice rescuing Japanese nationals.

In November 2017, a C-2 of the 403rd Tactical Airlift Squadron deployed to the base for the first time. In the same month, it was confirmed that the base would be expanded. Currently 12 hectares (30 acres), Japan will lease 3 hectares (7.4 acres) on the eastern side of the SDF base.

In December 2023, the base was designated as a base of operations for transporting Japanese nationals from conflict zones.

== Units ==
The following units are based in Djibouti:

- Deployment Air Force Counter Piracy Enforcement (Japanese: 派遣海賊対処行動航空隊)
- Deployment Support-Group for Counter Piracy Enforcement (Japanese: 派遣海賊対処行動支援隊)

== See also ==
- Other military bases in Djibouti:
  - Chinese People's Liberation Army Support Base in Djibouti
  - Camp Lemonnier
  - Djibouti–Ambouli International Airport
