= Dara-Salaam Bank =

- Company type: Private company
- Industry: Banking, finance
- Founded: March 2010; 16 years ago
- Headquarters: Hargeisa, Somaliland
- Products: Loans, debit cards, ATM, guarantees
- Website: www.darasalaambank.com

The Dara-Salaam Bank (DSB) is a bank headquartered in Hargeisa, the capital of Somaliland.

A Muslim financial institution, the bank provides personal banking and corporate banking. Its Islamic banking services and facilities include Mudarabah, Murabaha, Musharakah and Istisna'a. Additionally, the bank offers electronic banking, SMS banking, mobile banking and internet banking.

== History ==
Dara-Salaam Bank was established in March 2010.

In September 2010, the bank launched an independent (Kaafi) service, partnering with parent company Telesom.

== Services ==
Salaam Bank's personal banking services include current accounts and savings accounts. The current accounts permit clients to pay for utilities through online, mobile, and direct debit orders, receive and wire international transfers, make payments via checks, use the Salaam Debit Card for purchases/withdrawals at ATM and EFTPOS locations, and access their accounts online and through mobile devices.

The institution's corporate banking services include current accounts, fund transfers, Letters of Credit, and Letters of Guarantee. The current accounts are reserved for entities with valid commercial/industrial registration. Wire fund transfers can be made from the client's account to any other global bank account. Letters of Credit are aimed at reducing counterpart risk and can be fully or partially covered by the client. Letters of Guarantee are intended to safeguard against contractual risk and can be domestic or foreign.

Additionally, the bank provides other common types of guarantees. Among these are tender/bid bonds, performance bonds, payment guarantees, and shipping guarantees.

== See also ==
- First Somali Bank
- International Bank of Somalia
- Salaam Bank
