= People's Liberation Army Support Base in Djibouti =

China's first overseas military base

- 中国人民解放军驻吉布提保障基地
- Near Balbala in Djibouti
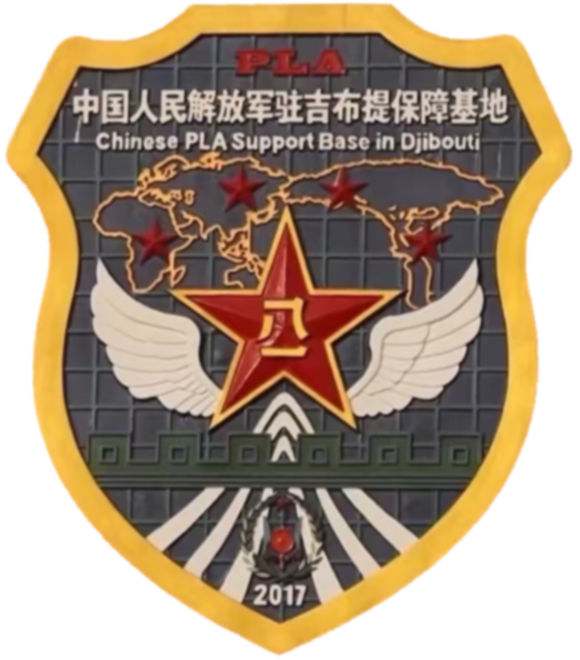
- Emblem of the PLA support base in Djibouti

- Naval ensign of China Naval ensign of China

Site information
- Owner: Central Military Commission
- Operator: People's Liberation Army Navy
- Controlled by: China

Location
- Coordinates: 11.58747°N 43.06082°E
- Area: 0.5 km^{2}

Site history
- Built: March 2016
- In use: August 1, 2017; 9 years ago

Garrison information
- Current commander: Liang Yang
- Occupants: 1,000–2,000 navy personnel

People's Liberation Army Support Base in Djibouti
- Chinese: 中国人民解放军驻吉布提保障基地
- Literal meaning: China People Liberation Army in-Djibouti Support Base
Transcriptions
Standard Mandarin
- Hanyu Pinyin: Zhōngguó Rénmín Jiěfàngjūn Zhù Jíbùtí Bǎozhàng Jīdì

The People's Liberation Army Support Base in Djibouti is a military base operated by China's People's Liberation Army Navy (PLAN), located in Djibouti in the Horn of Africa. It is the PLAN's first and only official overseas military base and was built at a cost of US$590 million. The facility is expected to significantly increase China's power projection in the Horn of Africa and the Indian Ocean, as well as the PLAN's blue-water capabilities.

The People's Liberation Army Navy has used the base to conduct anti-piracy operations off the coast of Djibouti and around the Horn of Africa. It is also expected to take part in activities such as intelligence collection, non-combat evacuation operations, peacekeeping operations support and counterterrorism. As of 2017, the base commander is Liang Yang.

Djibouti is strategically situated by the Bab-el-Mandeb Strait, which separates the Gulf of Aden from the Red Sea and guards the approaches to the Suez Canal. The Chinese base is located by the Chinese-operated Port of Doraleh to the west of Djibouti City. To the south of the city are several other foreign military bases, including Camp Lemonnier (United States Navy), Base Aérienne 188 (French Air Force), and the Japan Self-Defense Force Base Djibouti.

== History ==
Negotiations for China to create a strategic base in Djibouti began with President Ismaïl Omar Guelleh in approximately 2015. Negotiations were concluded in January 2016, with China and Djibouti having "reached consensus" on the construction of naval facilities, and in March 2016, construction of the naval base began.

On July 11, 2017, the People's Liberation Army Navy dispatched ships from the South Sea Fleet in Zhanjiang to open the base officially. The base was formally opened on August 1, 2017. The first live fire exercises were conducted on September 22, 2017.

Around May 2018, China began constructing a large-scale pier (over 330 meters in length or 1,120 feet) at the base, and appeared to be fully completed after 18 months from a satellite photo taken in December 2019. Satellite analysis show that China may be building a second pier or quay as to increase the naval capacity of the base.

Due to the COVID-19 pandemic, beginning in April 2020, the People's Liberation Army Navy began taking precautions to prevent a COVID-19 outbreak at the base by enforcing stricter entry and exit controls as well as deploying additional medical personnel to the base. The precautions also were adopted at other military bases in China.

== Functions ==
China has stated that the facility will serve primarily to support military logistics for Chinese troops in the Gulf of Aden, and also other activities that are a net positive for maritime public goods, including peacekeeping, humanitarian and disaster relief operations in Africa. It also bolsters the Chinese navy's efforts to prevent piracy on high seas, and allows easy access for the PLAN warships into the Arabian Sea, Persian Gulf and Indian Ocean.

China views its facility in Djibouti as consistent with its obligations under its 2015 National Security Law, which calls for protection of strategic energy supply channels (in clause 28) and citizens abroad (in clause 30). Based on its experience evacuating 35,000 Chinese citizens from Libya in 2011 and over 600 from Yemen in 2015, China sought a more permanent presence in the region to facilitate evacuations if necessary in the future. However, China avoids the terms "military base" or "naval base" and prefers the term "support facility" or "logistic facility". This implies a different approach to naval power projection.

The heavily fortified base is 0.5 square kilometres (0.2 sq mi) in size and staffed by approximately 1,000–2,000 personnel, and has an underground space of 23,000 square meters. The base has a 400m runway with an air traffic control tower, as well as a large helicopter apron. The base also houses the PLA Support Base Hospital in Djibouti.

A pier finished construction in December 2019. The 1,120 foot pier is reported to be long enough to be able to fit the PLAN's two new aircraft carriers and other warships or at least four nuclear powered submarines.

== Assessment ==
=== Tensions with foreign militaries ===
The presence of a Chinese base in close proximity to a US base has created geopolitical tensions. The United States had blocked a Russian base in 2014 and started a US$1 billion upgrade of Camp Lemonnier. US government officials were "blindsided" by Djibouti's approval of a Chinese base just two years later. Djiboutian President Ismaïl Omar Guelleh claimed that the United States had a "fixation" about the Chinese base and complained "incessantly" that the Chinese were hampering their operations. He also said that the Japanese were even more worried than the Americans. Guelleh said that the Chinese would have no problem cohabiting with Western powers if they didn't "spy constantly" on the Chinese.

According to Chinese prosecutor Jian Jiamin, the Japan Maritime Self-Defence Force sent divers to approach a Chinese warship while it was docked at the base, who were detected and driven off.

In 2018, the United States Department of Defense issued a NOTAM reporting instances of laser attacks against pilots flying near the base, injuring two airmen. The Chinese Defense Ministry denied the accusations and asked the United States "to not swiftly speculate or make accusations." China, in turn, complains low-flying American aircraft have conducted spy missions near its base.

A 2024 report by the Center for Strategic International Studies identifies Djibouti, along with three other sites in Cuba, as most likely to be supporting China's efforts to collect intelligence on the United States and its neighbors.

=== Economic impact ===
According to Thierry Pairault of the French National Centre for Scientific Research, Chinese investment has limited yet positive growing impact for Djiboutians despite the mainly outward-looking of the effort.

== See also ==
- Africa–China relations
- Africa–China economic relations
- String of Pearls (Indian Ocean), China's power projection strategy
- Belt and Road Initiative
  - Maritime Silk Road
- Ream Naval Base Unofficial Chinese Naval base
- List of military bases
- Other military bases in Djibouti:
  - Japan Self-Defense Force Base Djibouti
  - Camp Lemonnier
  - Djibouti–Ambouli International Airport
