= Camp Lemonnier =

Base of the U.S. Defense Department in Djibouti

- Ambouli, Djibouti City in Djibouti
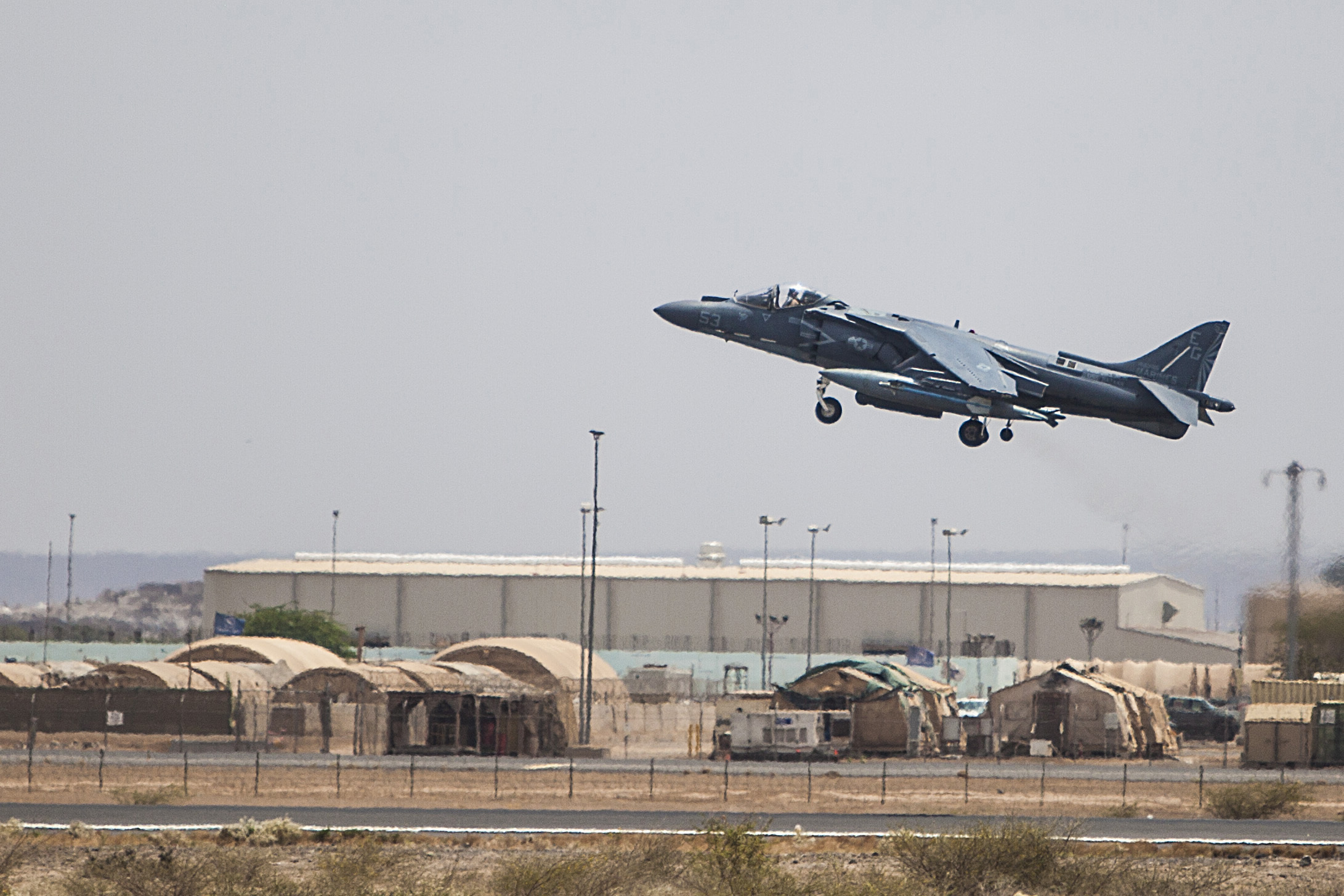
- A US Marine Corps AV-8B Harrier landing at Camp Lemonnier in 2014

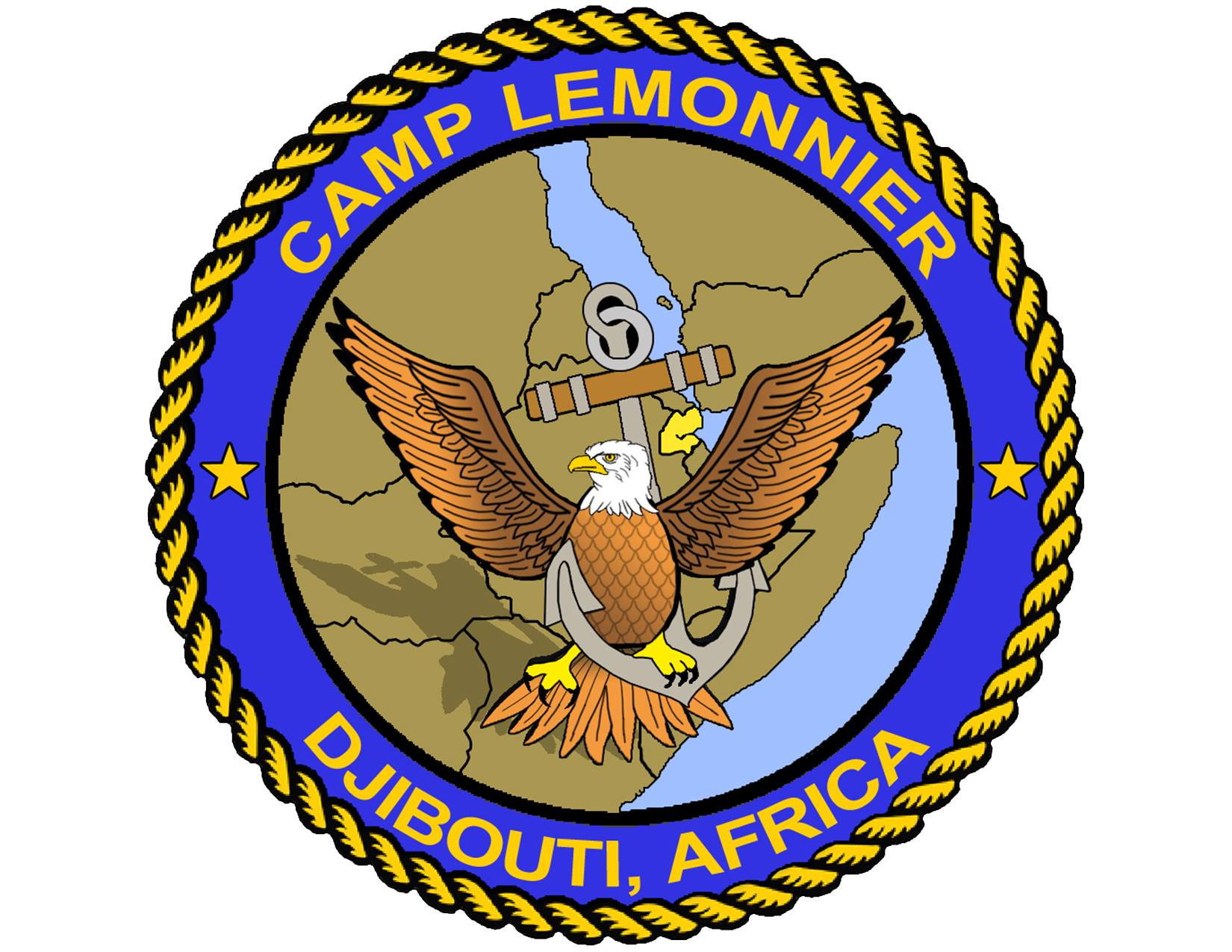

Site information
- Type: Department of Defense base
- Owner: Government of Djibouti (leased to the US)
- Operator: United States Navy
- Controlled by: Navy Region Europe, Africa, Central
- Condition: Operational
- Website: Official website

Location
- Location in Djibouti
- Coordinates: 11°32′37″N 43°08′55″E

Site history
- Built: 2002
- In use: 2002 – present

Garrison information
- Current commander: Captain S.J.M. Krauss
- Garrison: Combined Joint Task Force-Horn of Africa

Airfield information
- Identifiers: IATA: JIB, ICAO: HDAM
- Elevation: 15 metres (49 ft) AMSL
Runways
Direction	Length and surface
09/27	3,150 metres (10,335 ft) Asphalt
- Airfield shared with Djibouti–Ambouli International Airport

Camp Lemonnier is a United States Naval Expeditionary Base, situated next to Djibouti–Ambouli International Airport in Djibouti City, and home to the Combined Joint Task Force – Horn of Africa (CJTF-HOA) of the U.S. Africa Command (AFRICOM). It is the largest U.S. military base in Africa. The camp is operated by U.S. Navy Region Europe, Africa, Central. The regional JSOC high-value-targets task force and CJTF-HOA were the most notable tenants as of 2012.

Camp Lemonnier was originally established for the French Foreign Legion. The base was leased by Djibouti to the United States in 2002, along with the right to use the neighbouring airport and port facilities. The base supports CIA and DOD anti-terrorist operations in Yemen and Somalia (Copper Dune and Jupiter Garnet), at the centre of the network of U.S. drone and surveillance bases stretching across Africa. The latter air bases are smaller and operate from remote hangars situated within local military bases or civilian airports.

Unlike French troops, who have comparatively broader freedom of movement, U.S. troops may leave Camp Lemonnier only with special permission, and much of Djibouti City is off limits to them.

== History ==
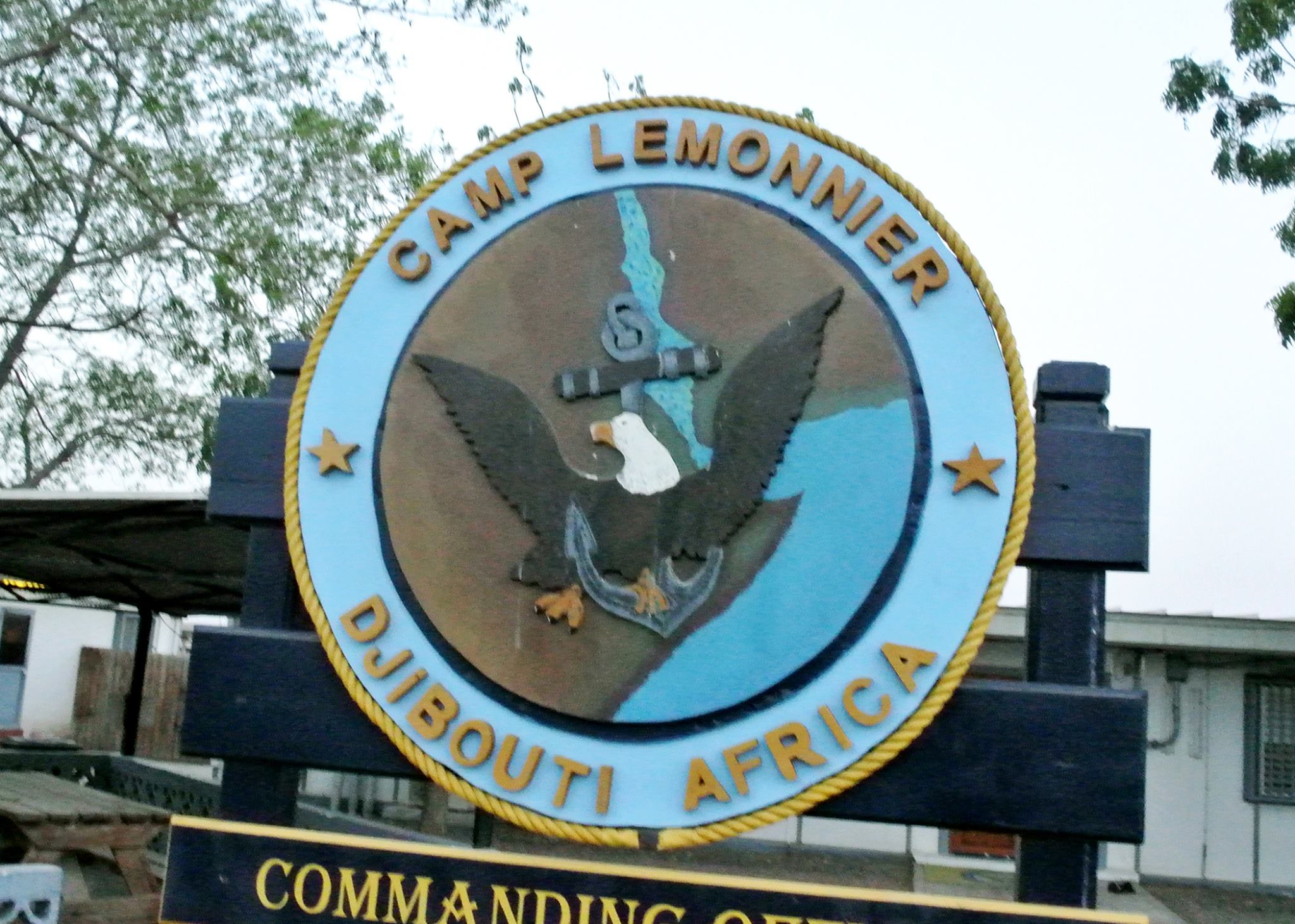
A sign bearing the Camp Lemonnier patch.

Camp Lemonnier is located in the town of Ambouli on the southern side of Djibouti–Ambouli International Airport, between the runway overflow areas and a French military munitions storage facility. After use by the French Foreign Legion, the facility was operated by the Djibouti Armed Forces.

Lemonnier originally belonged to the French Armed Forces, and was named after General Émile-René Lemonnier. Commander of the 3rd Brigade of the Tonkin Division, led with fierce energy the resistance to the Japanese coup d'état in French Indochina. In 2009, after years of misspelling, the U.S. Navy officially changed the camp's name to properly reflect the spelling of General Lemonnier's name.

Following the September 11, 2001 attacks, the Combined Joint Task Force-Horn of Africa was established to hunt down terrorists in the region. As targets were few, the task force was reoriented towards defence/diplomacy/development type activities. In November 2002, the CJTF-HOA staff, drawn from Headquarters 2nd Marine Division, arrived off the coast of Djibouti aboard the command ship USS Mount Whitney. Djiboutian workers were instrumental in preparing the newly renovated 88-acre (360,000 m^{2}) camp for movement of the CJTF headquarters ashore. More than 1,200 local and third-country national construction and support personnel currently work at the camp. KBR administers the contract for facilities and support operations for the camp.

Initial occupation of Camp Lemonnier was cemented by Naval Special Warfare SEAL Team One Bravo, along with two Air Force Combat Controllers, Roger Purseley and Bill Adams, and two Air Force Pararescuemen, Richard Oberstar and Ronald Ellis, from the 23rd Special Tactics Squadron. A Marine Corps FAST team was the secondary force to occupy Camp Lemonnier in June 2002, providing security while Army Special Forces Logistics specialists (SOT-A) planned the development to receive more forces. Initial Command and Control was established under SOCCENT by a US Air Force Special Operations command element. The initial US combat forces started with Air Force MC-130s and MH-53s redeploying from Jacobabad, Pakistan, followed shortly by 7th SFG soldiers and an Army Tank Support Battalion for base support.

The combined joint special operations task force which set up operations in mid-2002 was supported by the 87th Combat Support Battalion from Fort Stewart, who ran base operations, and the 80th Transportation Detachment from Fort Hood, augmented by soldiers from the 11th Transportation Battalion from Fort Story, who set up and operated the aerial and sea ports of debarkation. Once the camp had been suitably established for operations and life support, the base was transferred to the newly-established CJTF-HOA.

While the intent was to move ashore, the Camp Lemonnier facilities which had not been in use for several years were in a state of disrepair. Some buildings were concrete shells and had been stripped of interior fixtures, pipes and wiring, while the roofs of several structures had collapsed. Goats roamed the property and birds had taken roost in several of the abandoned structures. The former swimming pool had been used as a trash dump. Some buildings that were closer to the Djiboutian Air Force controlled side of the airport were in better shape and required minimal renovation. As a result, the CJTF-HOA staff remained aboard the USS Mount Whitney as the U.S. Army (Bravo Company, 46th Engineer Battalion (CBT)(HVY)) began renovations. (Camp Physical Security was first established by Marines from 2D Fleet Anti-Terrorism Security Team (FAST Co) and was handed over to the 551st Military Police Company, 101st Airborne Division.) This involved building new concrete pads, maintenance facilities and living areas.

On November 3, 2002, a CIA General Atomics MQ-1 Predator drone flying from Djibouti launched a missile which killed six Al-Qaeda suspects in Yemen. The most notable was Al-Qaeda leader Qa’id Salim Sinan al Harithi, also known as Abu Mi, one of the alleged masterminds of the USS Cole bombing.

In May 2003, Camp Lemonnier was liveable. Combined Joint Task Force-Horn of Africa (CJTF-HOA) began moving all headquarters personnel and equipment from its flagship, USS Mount Whitney, in the Gulf of Aden, into facilities at Camp Lemonnier on 6 May 2003. The pool was cleaned, refurbished, and opened in spring of 2003.

In early July 2006, the U.S. and Djiboutian governments also announced that a lease agreement had been signed to expand Camp Lemonnier from 88 acres (360,000 m^{2}) to nearly 500 acres (2 km^{2}). The term of the lease was for five years, with options to renew. As part of the lease and expansion, physical improvements to the camp included fencing, additional billeting to replace existing tents, and compliance with various U.S. force protection standoff requirements.

On 1 July 2006, the U.S. Marine Corps turned over responsibility for Camp Lemonnier to the U.S. Navy in a brief change of command ceremony. U.S. Navy Captain Robert Fahey assumed command of Camp Lemonnier from U.S. Marine Corps Colonel Gerard Fischer.

In January 2007, it was announced Camp Lemonnier would be expanded from 97 acres (0.39 km^{2}) to nearly 500 acres (2.0 km^{2}). As part of the process of moving Lemonnier from an "expeditionary" base to a long term facility, the camp built a billeting area with rows of Containerized Living Units (CLUs) with concrete sidewalks and gravel roads. As the CLU area expanded, the camp population moved from tents into the more durable berthing facilities.

=== Transfer to Africa Command ===
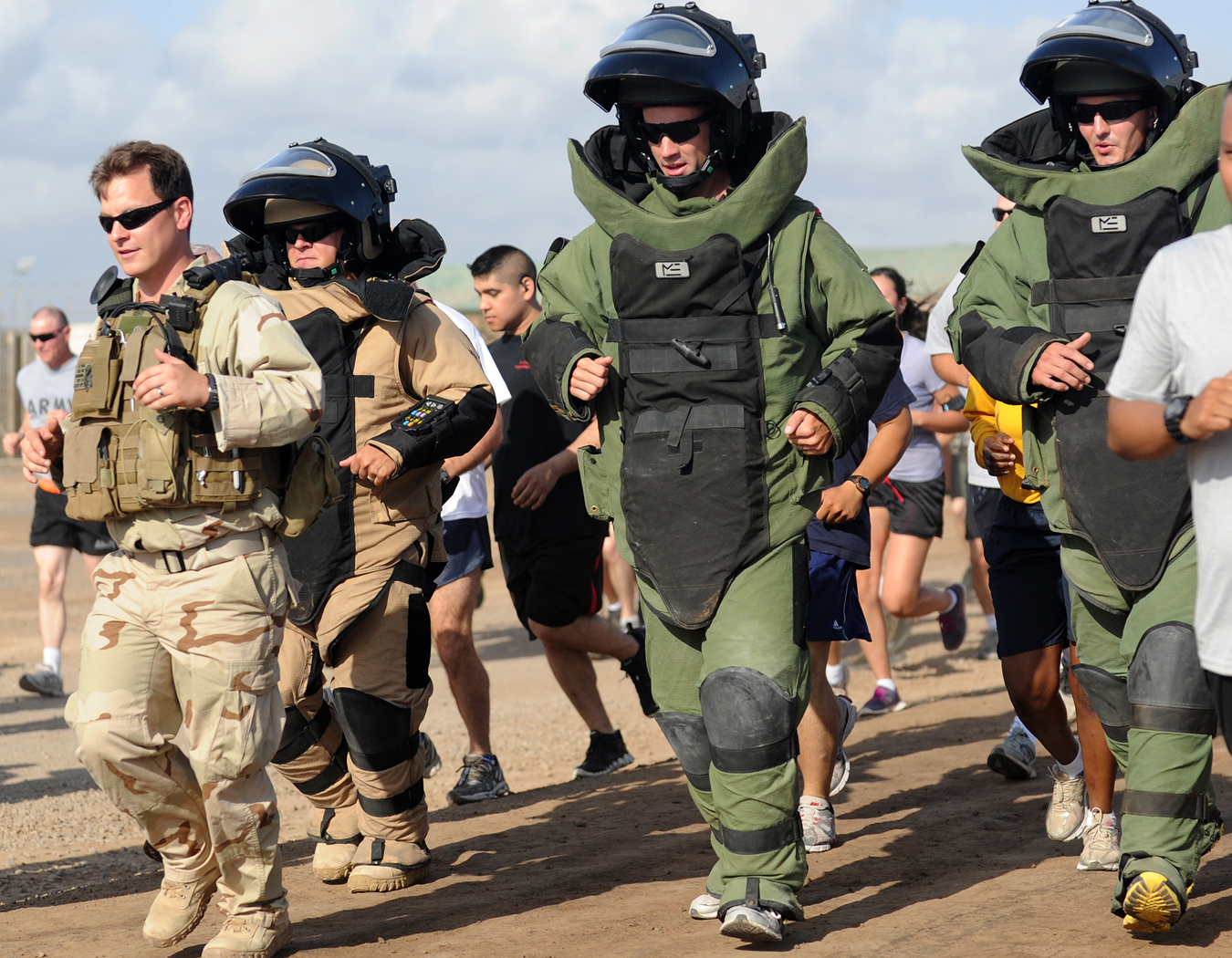
CJTF-HOA soldiers taking part in the 2011 Explosive Ordnance Disposal 5-K Run at Camp Lemonnier.

On 1 October 2008, responsibility for the task force was transferred from the United States Central Command (USCENTCOM) to United States Africa Command (USAFRICOM). That day AFRICOM assumed authority over DOD operations in Africa, excluding Egypt.

By 2009, the base began expansion again. "The United States.. sought to counter Al-Qaeda in the Arabian Peninsula (AQAP) through a campaign of airstrikes that began in late 2009." Drone attacks were flown from bases outside Yemen by Joint Special Operations Command and the CIA. Many of these attacks were launched from Djibouti - Camp Lemonnier/Djibouti International Airport.

According to OSGEOINT, Camp Lemonnier received a parallel taxi-way and a new auxiliary support apron. In the following year (2011), open source satellite imagery showed Camp Lemmonier with a new drone apron supporting the RQ/MQ-1 Predator.

The Economist wrote in December 2012 that Lemonnier was "the most important base for drone operations outside the war zone of Afghanistan", with drones conducting missions in adjacent Yemen and Somalia. Neville wrote that "..in a separate secure compound within the camp, much like the SOF enclave in Bagram, are an estimated 300 JSOC personnel. The personnel comprise special operators, imagery and intelligence analysts, and a dedicated UAV cell. The UAV cell is commanded by a JSOC Major and tasks a flight of eight MQ-1 Predators conducting operations over Somalia, Mali, and Yemen."

In March and May 2011, three MQ-1 Predator mid-flight mechanical problems took place, leading to two crashes and a drone overshooting the runway, crashing into a fence. In mid-May 2011 a UAV and its live AGM-114 Hellfire missile crashed in a Djibouti suburb. The story in The Washington Post that reported the crashes in December 2012 said there had been two more mid-flight mechanical problems with drones in Djibouti, for a total of five.

In October 2011, a squadron of USAF McDonnell Douglas F-15E Strike Eagles arrived at the base. They flew numerous combat missions into Yemen in support of both Yemeni government forces and unilateral strikes directed by JSOC and CIA targeting cells. Along with the UAVs and F-15Es, surveillance flights were conducted by U.S. Air Force Special Operations Command Pilatus U-28As, that were outfitted with sophisticated signals intercept equipment and optical sensors, which can provide real-time intelligence for ground operators.

On 25 January 2012, US officials confirmed that US Navy SEALs had rescued two foreign hostages in Somalia, an American woman and Danish man, taking them to Camp Lemonnier. Demining workers, the captives had been abducted on 25 October 2011 in the north-central Galkayo area, allegedly by gunmen operating on behalf of a private source who threatened to sell them to Al-Shabaab if their demands were not met.

The drones at the base flew missions as part of three named operations:

- Copper Dune - counter-terrorism operations in Yemen;
- Jupiter Garret - counter-terrorism operations in Somalia;
- Octave Shield - CJTF-HOA activities

As of May 2013, the DOD had prepared plans for a $1.4 billion expansion of the base and to increase its special forces there to more than 1,000.

In September 2013, the Predators and Reapers operating from Camp Lemonnier were moved to "a remote desert airstrip" later identified as Chabelley Airport.

In May 2014, U.S. President Obama and Djiboutian President Guelleh agreed on a 20-year extension of the American lease, at $63 million a year in rent – about double its previous rate. The US was expanding the base and planned to spend $1.4 billion upgrading the facility over the next two decades.

A U.S. military investigation in 2015 concluded that nine members of the 775th Engineer Detachment (194th Engineer Brigade, Tennessee Army National Guard) patronized prostitutes at an off-base residence in Djibouti and at a hotel in Dire Dawa, Ethiopia, despite having been warned of the prevalence of sex trafficking in the area.

In 2017, China opened a base nearby, the Chinese People's Liberation Army Support Base in Djibouti. In May 2018, the United States Air Force said military grade lasers had been aimed at the eyes of its pilots and the incidents had originated on the Chinese base. China denied that they were the source of the lasers, stating that they abide by international law.

=== Detention of deportees from the USA ===
On May 20, 2025 eight men, citizens of Vietnam, South Korea, Mexico, Laos, Cuba, Myanmar and South Sudan, all convicted of serious crimes in the United States, were deported from the USA to Camp Lemonnier after the Donald Trump administration attempted to expel them to South Sudan, while judge Brian E. Murphy of the United States District Court for the District of Massachusetts blocked that expulsion, telling the administration they could not send these men to the war-stricken country before they were given an opportunity to contest their deportation. As a result, the Trump administration detained the deportees in Camp Lemonnier under the guard of ICE officers.

The Trump administration informed the court on June 6 that they were detaining the migrants in a conference room within a Conex shipping container in Camp Lemonnier that is "not equipped nor suitable for detention of any length"; the Trump administration also reported the conditions being "smoke from the burn pits" that makes it "difficult to breathe" and "imminent danger of rocket attacks from terrorist groups in Yemen".

== Base of operations ==
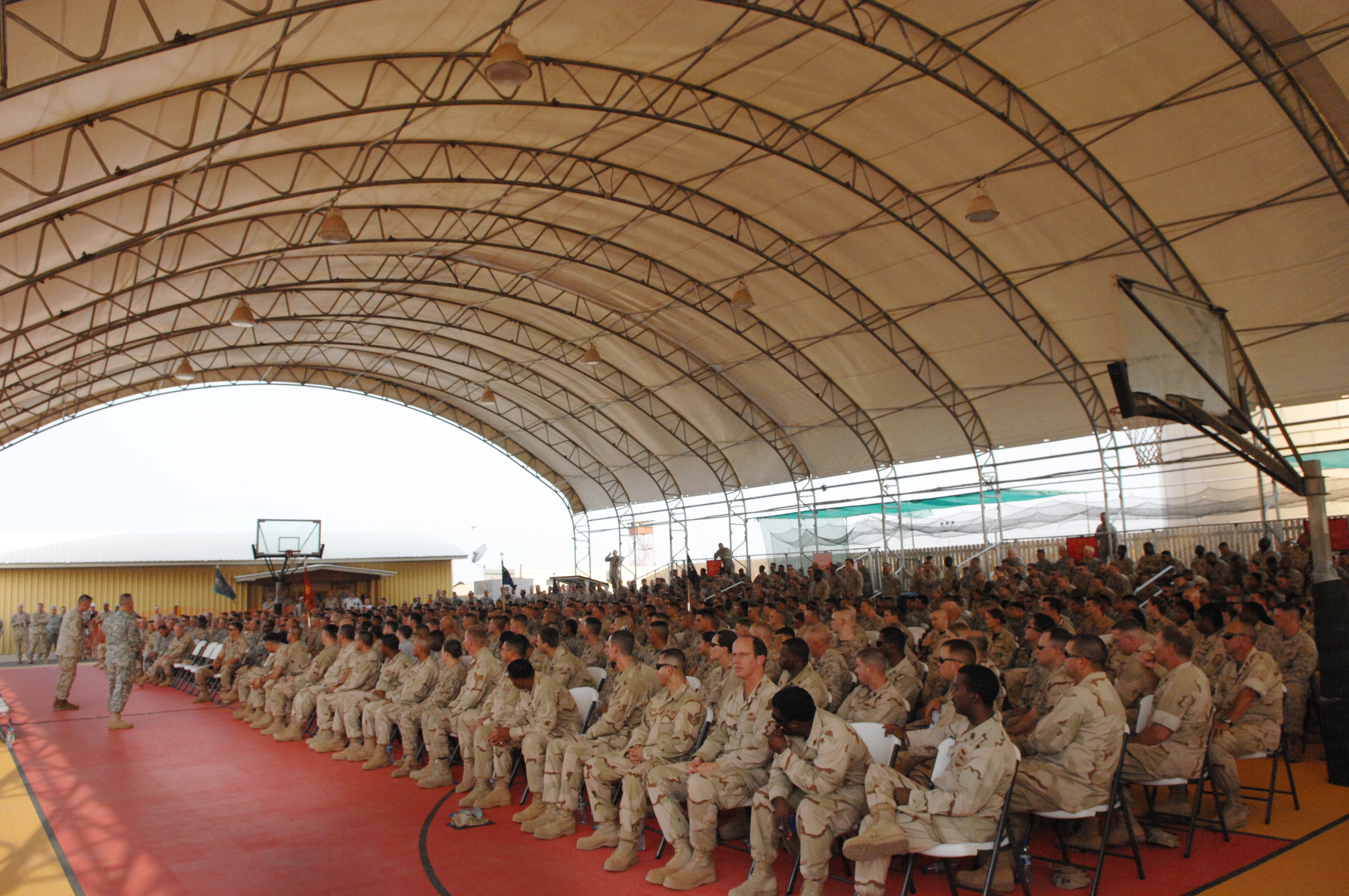
"Thunder Dome" at Camp Lemonnier

Camp Lemonnier became the hub for black and white SOF operations into nations such as Somalia and Yemen. Also based there is the SOCCE-HOA (Special Operations Command and Control Element-Horn of Africa) – which commands all SOCOM units assigned to training or operational missions in the region including elements of JSOTF-TS (Joint Special Operations Task Force-Trans Sahara) and Naval Special Warfare Unit 10. It also supervises a rotational detachment of US Army Special Forces which conducts foreign Internal Defence training in counterinsurgency in Djibouti.

== Tenant commands ==
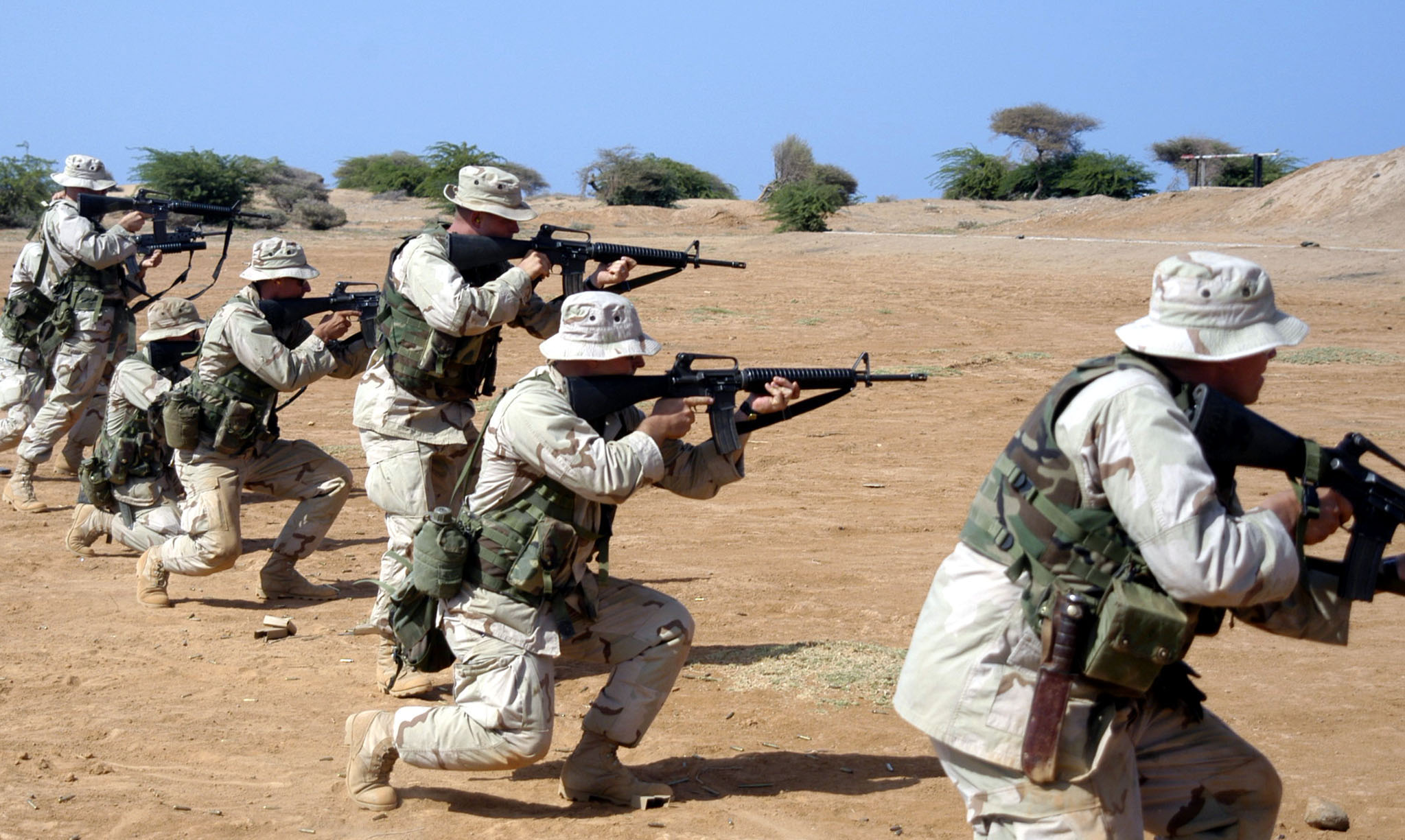
Marines train with M16A2 rifles in March 2003 at Camp Lemonnier

Ground forces

Camp Lemonnier is operated by Commander, Navy Region Europe, Africa, Southwest Asia, which is responsible for its expansion, upkeep, and logistics support. Tenant units include the U.S. Marine Security Forces which provides the camp's external security, the CJTF-HOA commander and staff, a U.S. Navy Seabee battalion which conducts water-well drilling operations, U.S. Army units which provide additional security, military training, and Civil-military operations support, and several aircraft detachments.

Past tenant units have included the U.S. Marine 8th and 9th Provisional Security Force (PSC), U.S. Army 2nd Battalion, 18th Field Artillery Regiment, U.S. Army 1st Battalion, 65th Infantry Regiment, U.S. Army 1st Battalion, 16th Infantry Regiment, U.S. Air Force First Red Horse Group, U.S. Army 2nd Battalion, 137th Infantry Regiment, U.S. Army 3rd Squadron, 124th Cavalry Regiment, and U.S. Army 2nd Battalion, 138th Field Artillery Regiment.

Aviation units

The 449th Air Expeditionary Group is U.S. Air Force component to CJTF-HOA and is assigned to Camp Lemonnier. The 449th AEG is currently composed of HC-130P Hercules COMBAT KING or HC-130J COMBAT KING II aircraft assigned to the 81st Expeditionary Rescue Squadron and pararescuemen assigned to the 82nd Expeditionary Rescue Squadron. While deployed the group performed both combat and civil search and rescue missions.

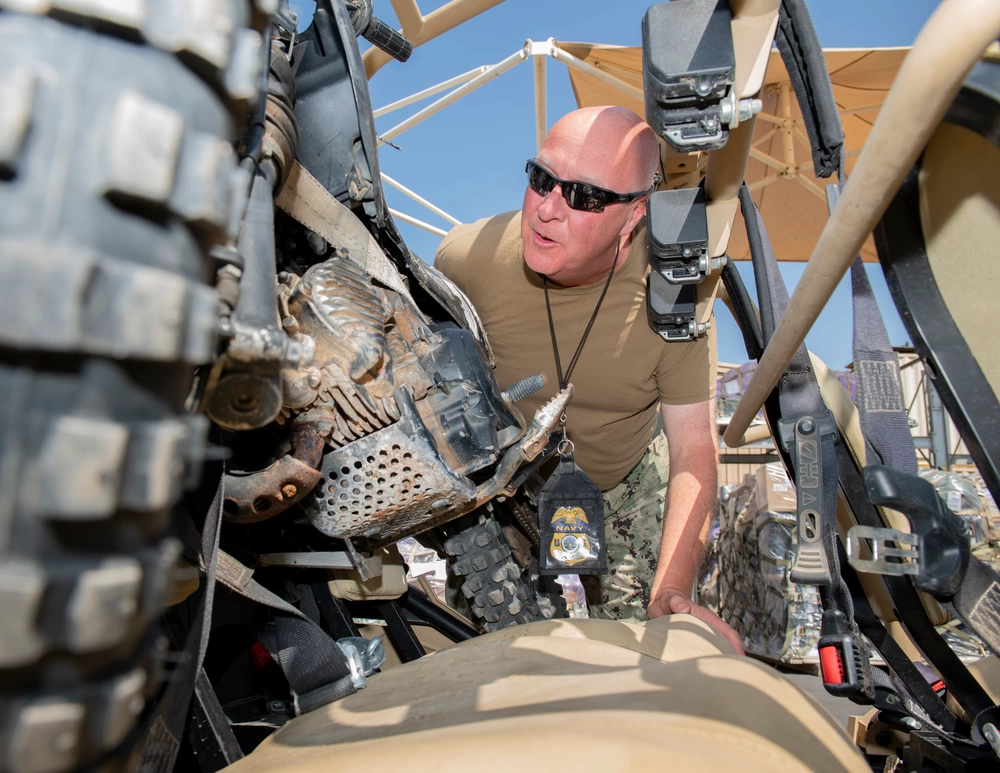
Mud, sand, and grass may carry pests and weed seeds to equipment's next berthing upon leaving Djibouti

Aircraft detachments include a U.S. Marine heavy-lift helicopter (CH-53) detachment, a U.S. Marine assault-support MV-22 Osprey detachment, a U.S. Marine Aerial Refueler Transport KC-130J detachment, a U.S. Navy P-8 Poseidon detachment (technically a part of the US Navy's 6th Fleet – Commander Task Force 67), USAF aircraft include HC-130P COMBAT KING or HC-130J COMBAT KING II, HH-60G Pave Hawk, C-130J Hercules and, at times, a C-17 Globemaster III detachment.

Other

Customs inspections for exotic organisms is the responsibility of the Navy Logistics team.

== See also ==
- Al-Qaeda insurgency in Yemen
- Chinese naval base in Djibouti
- Japan Self-Defense Force Base Djibouti
- List of United States Navy airfields
