= Al Gamil =

Privately held company based in Djibouti City, Djibouti

- Company type: Private
- Industry: construction, import/export
- Headquarters: Djibouti City, Djibouti
- Products: Construction materials, foodstuffs, vehicles
- Website: algamil.net

Al Gamil is a privately held company based in Djibouti City, Djibouti.

== Overview ==
Al Gamil is the largest construction firm in Djibouti. It has its headquarters in the national capital, Djibouti City.

Besides the local construction industry, the Al-Gamil Group (Groupe Al Gamil) also imports and exports various commodities. Among these products for the domestic and international markets are construction materials, foodstuffs and vehicles.

== Branches and memberships ==
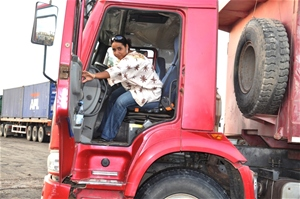
A truck operator at Al Gamil, the largest construction company in Djibouti.

The company is a member of the Club Echanges Normandie Afrique. It has additional offices in Dubai and Sharjah in the United Arab Emirates.

== See also ==
- Dahabshil Bank International
- List of companies based in Djibouti
