= Salaam Bank =

- Company type: Private company
- Traded as: Islamic banking services provider
- Industry: Banking, finance
- Founded: 2011
- Headquarters: Bosaso, Puntland
- Products: Loans, debit cards, ATM, guarantees
- Website: www.salaambank.net

The Salaam Bank (SB) is a bank headquartered in city of Bosaso, the commercial hub of Puntland in the Bari region.

== Overview ==
Salaam Bank was established in February 2011.

As a financial institution, the bank provides personal banking and corporate banking. Its Islamic banking services and facilities include Mudarabah, Murabaha, Musharakah and Istisna'a. Additionally, the bank offers electronic banking, SMS banking, mobile banking and internet debit.

In August 2011, the bank also launched an independent (Kaaftoon) service partnering the institution with Golis Telecom Somalia.

== Services ==
Salaam Bank's personal banking services include current accounts and savings accounts. The current accounts permit clients to pay for utilities through online, mobile, and direct debit orders, receive and wire international transfers, make payments via checks, use the Salaam Debit Card for purchases/withdrawals at ATM and POS locations, and access their accounts online and through mobile devices.

The institution's corporate banking services include current accounts, fund transfers, Letters of Credit, and Letters of Guarantee. The current accounts are reserved for entities with valid commercial/industrial registration. Wire fund transfers can be made from the client's account to any other global bank account. Letters of Credit are aimed at reducing counterpart risk and can be fully or partially covered by the client. Letters of Guarantee are intended to safeguard against contractual risk and can be domestic or foreign.

Additionally, the bank provides other common types of guarantees. Among these are tender/bid bonds, performance bonds, payment guarantees, and shipping guarantees.

== See also ==
- First Somali Bank
- International Bank of Somalia
