= List of banks in Djibouti =

This is a list of banks in Djibouti, as updated in late 2024 by the Central Bank of Djibouti.

== List of banks ==
=== Commercial banks ===
- Bank of Africa Mer Rouge (BOA), part of Bank of Africa Group
- Banque pour le Commerce et l'Industrie – Mer Rouge (BCIMR), part of BRED Banque Populaire
- International Investment Bank (IIB), owned by Bahrain-based iiB Group Holdings WLL
- Banque de Dépôt et de Crédit Djibouti (BDCD)
- CAC International Bank (CAC)
- Exim Bank Djibouti (EXIM), part of Exim Bank Group (East Afica)
- Commercial Bank of Ethiopia Djibouti (CBE), part of Commercial Bank of Ethiopia Group
- Silkroad International Bank Djibouti (SIB)
- Bank Of China Djibouti (BOC), part of Bank of China Group
- International Business Bank Djibouti (IBB), part of IB Bank Group

=== Islamic Banks ===
- Saba African Bank
- Salaam African Bank
- East Africa Bank

=== Microfinance institutions ===
- Caisse Populaire d’Epargne et de Crédit de Djibouti (CPECD)
- Caisse Populaire d’Epargne et de Crédit du Nord (CPECN)
- Caisse Populaire d’Epargne et de Crédit du Sud (CPECS)
- Unité Pilote de Microfinance Islamique (UPMFI)

== See also ==
- List of banks in Africa
- List of banks in the Arab world
- List of companies based in Djibouti
