= International Bank of Somalia =

IBS Bank
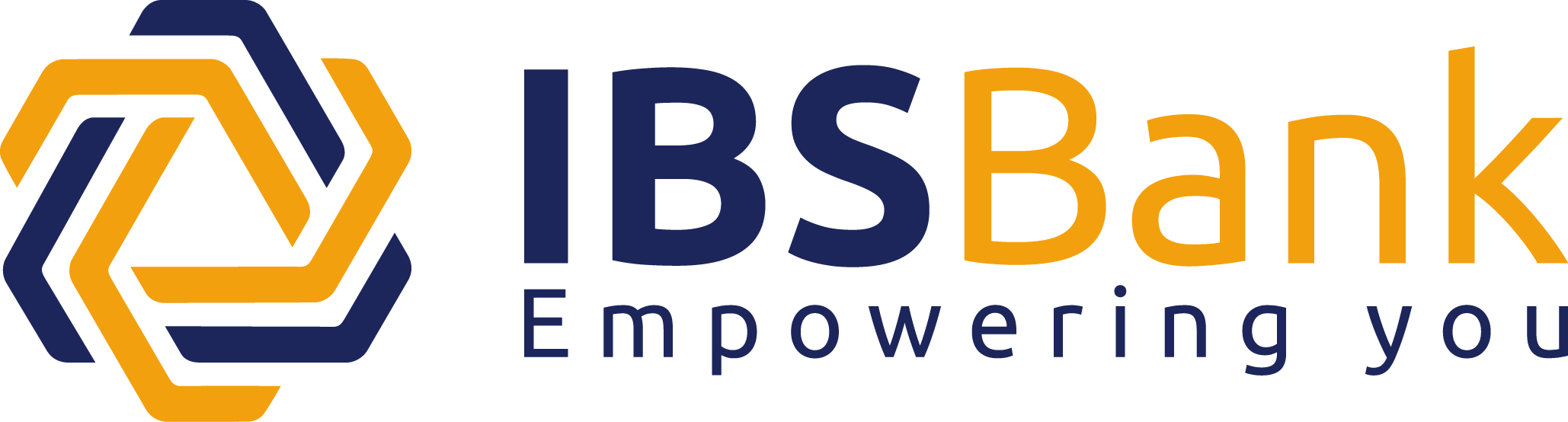
- Type: Private company
- Industry: Banking; Financial services
- Founded: 2014
- Headquarters: 1st Rd, 26 June District, Hargeisa & Trepiano Building, P.O.Box : 777, Waaberi,
- Key people: Mahat Mohamed Ahmed (CEO); Mohamed Ali (Chairman)
- Products: Investment banking, Retail banking, SME banking, Corporate banking, Digital banking, Microfinance, Mastercard, Visa
- Website: www.ibosbank.com

The (IBS) (Somali: Bangiga caalamiga ah ee IBS Bank) is an IBS Bank headquartered in Mogadishu, Somalia.

== Overview ==
IBS Bank began operations on 11 October 2014 in Mogadishu. Its opening ceremony was attended by President Hassan Sheikh Mohamud, along with various cabinet ministers, businessmen, and other invited guests.

IBS was incorporated in July 2013. As of March 2015, it is one of six local banks with commercial licences issued by the Central Bank of Somalia. The company is the first international bank in the country in over twenty years.

The bank adheres to global compliance, auditing and risk-management standards. It also plans to retain the auditor services of the US-based accountancy firm Deloitte. Additionally, the IBS Bank in March 2015 launched a $10 million public share offering. Investment share tranches were valued at between $500 and $500,000. The public share offer was 10% of the share capital, with an additional 31% percent owned by IBS' founders. Banks based in the United Arab Emirates were among the interested potential stakeholders. Further equity is expected to be made available as the bank grows in size.

The IBS Bank was founded by Somali entrepreneurs, who are primarily based in Dubai. Mahat Mohammed Ahmed serves as the bank's Chief Executive Officer.

IBS Bank is in partnership with MasterCard, Visa, USAID GEEL program and ILO. In July 2019, IBS bank launched its partnership with World Elite MasterCard debt cards.

== Services ==
IBS provides personal banking, commercial banking, wholesale banking, investment banking and Takaful to clients. Its services include trade finance, mortgages, deposits, overdrafts, project funds.

The bank is also slated to offer online banking and a mobile banking application.

== Branches ==
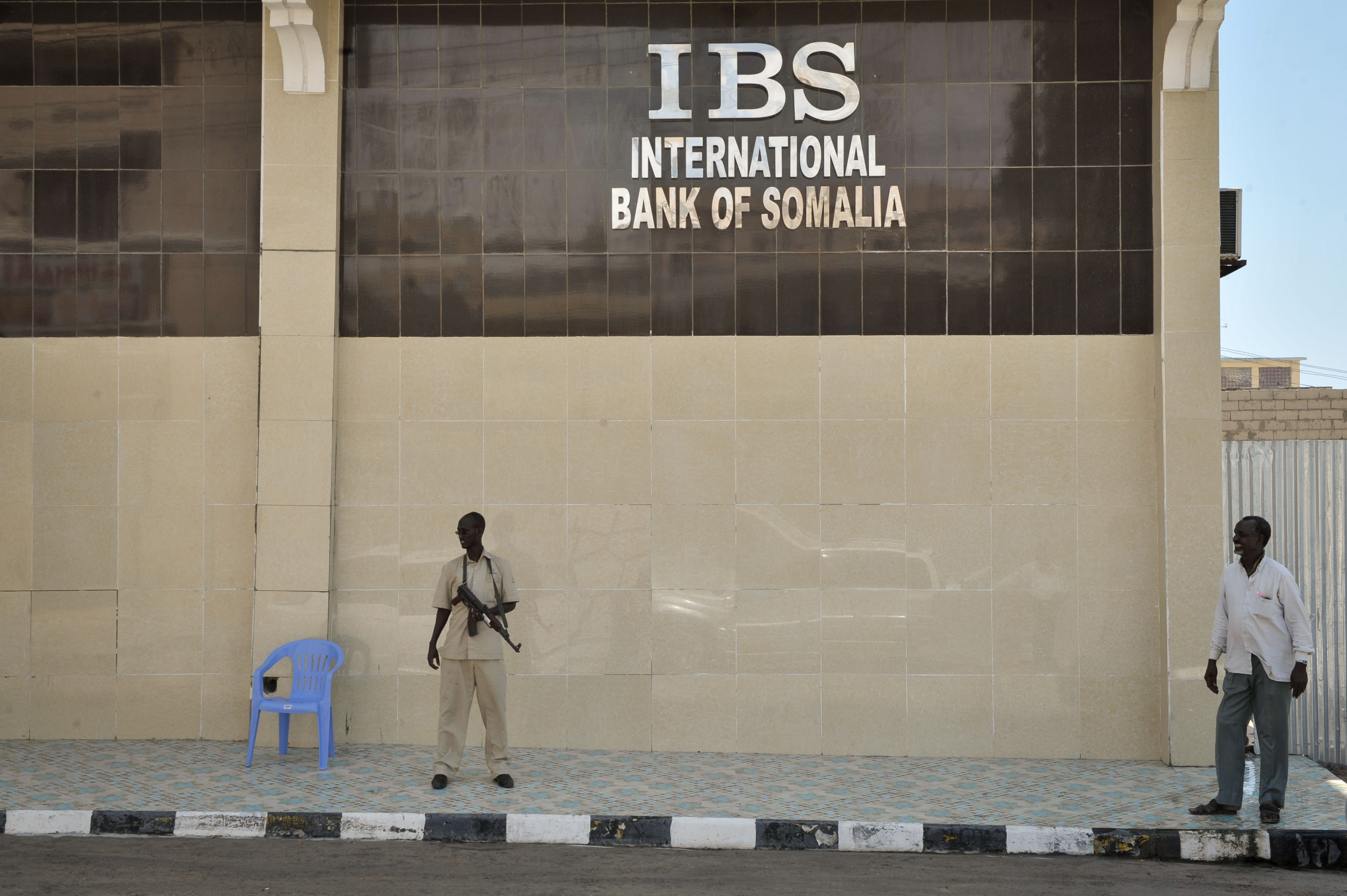
A guard stands outside of the International Bank of Somalia, branch in the Somali capital of Mogadishu.

IBS Bank has seven branches in main districts of Mogadishu and four branches in the cities Garowe, Kismayo, Bosaso, and Baidoa. It has also received license to operate in the republic of Somaliland.

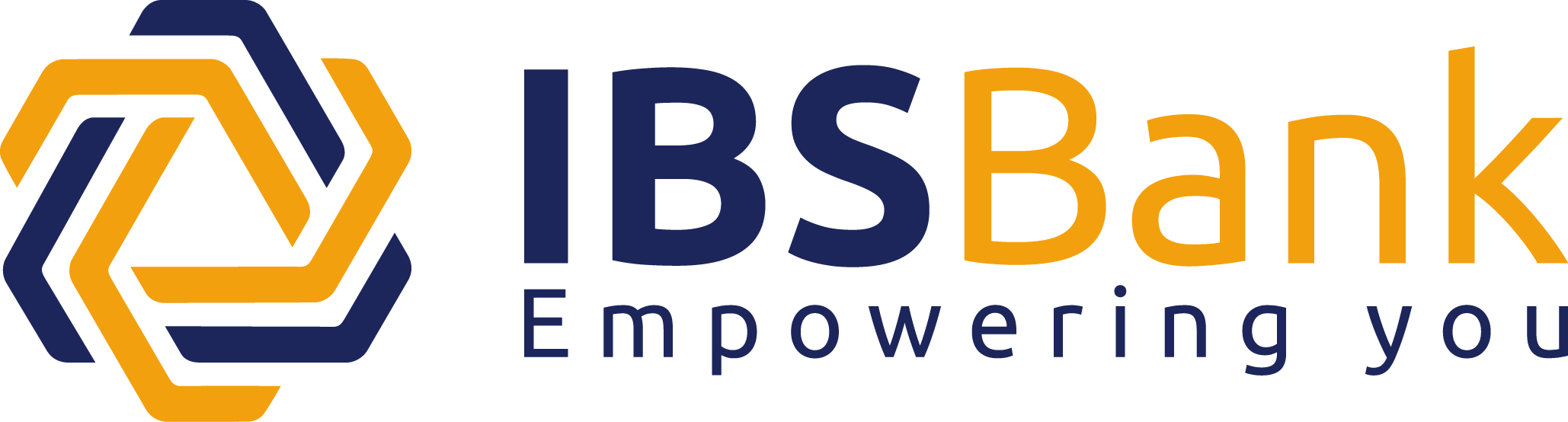
Logo from 2019

== Awards ==
IBS Bank have been awarded in 2016 and 2017 for the Bank of the Year award by the Somali Annual Business Awards (SABA Awards).

== See also ==
- Salaam Somali Bank
- Premier Bank
- List of Banks in Somalia and Somaliland
