= Banque pour le Commerce et l'Industrie – Mer Rouge =

Banque pour le Commerce et l'Industrie – Mer Rouge (BCIMR) is a bank in Djibouti. It has a market share of around 45%, and is the largest bank in the Horn of Africa. BCIMR is a subsidiary of the French bank BRED Banque populaire, which owns a 51% share in the company. The Government of Djibouti and a Yemeni bank own the remaining 33% and 16% shares, respectively. BCIMR has a branch in Hargeisa, situated in the self-declared Republic of Somaliland, internationally considered to be part of Somalia.

== History ==
In 1943, BNCI, an ancestor of BNP Paribas, took over Crédit Foncier de Madagascar et de la Réunion, which it renamed BNCI Océan Indien in 1954. BNCI Océan Indien opened a branch in Djibouti the same year. In 1977, when Djibouti achieved independence from France, BNP converted the branch into a subsidiary.

In July 2007, BNP Paribas sold BCIMR to the French banking group Banques Populaires.

In February 2009, BCIMR opened a branch in Hargeisa, becoming the first bank there since the dissolution of the Commercial and Savings Bank of Somalia in 1990.

== See also ==
- Economy of Djibouti
- List of banks in Djibouti

== Citations and references ==
Citations

References

- Alwan, Daoud Aboubakern, and Yohanis Mibrathu (2000) Historical Dictionary of Djibouti. (Scarecrow Press). ISBN 9780810838734
