= Djibouti Air =

Airline in Djibouti

IATA	ICAO	Call sign
DA	-	-
- Founded: 2011
- Ceased operations: 2012
- Hubs: Djibouti-Ambouli International Airport
- Focus cities: Dubai
- Fleet size: 1
- Destinations: 2
- Headquarters: Djibouti City, Djibouti
- Key people: Shabab Attarzadeh (CEO)
- Website: www.djibouti-air.com

Djibouti Air was an airline based in Djibouti that operated between 2011 and 2012. Its logo depicted the Djibouti spurfowl.

== Operations ==
Djibouti Air was owned by the government of Djibouti as well as a private investor from the United Arab Emirates.

The airline began operations on March 3, 2011, with a flight to Dubai from Djibouti. During that month, it also launched six weekly Djibouti–Dubai flights via its dual-class Boeing 737 aircraft.

In February 2012, the airline suspended its only scheduled services from the Djibouti-Ambouli International Airport to Dubai International Airport.

== Destinations ==
The airline only flew to Dubai, but the plans to launch flights to Ethiopia, Somalia, Yemen, Kenya, Malaysia, East Asia and Europe were cancelled after the airline went defunct. Additionally, it was set to offer more frequent flights throughout the Middle East.

== Fleet ==
Djibouti Air's fleet included the following aircraft types on the 5th of July, 2011, before it ceased operations:

- 1 Boeing 737-200
