= Dahabshil Bank International =

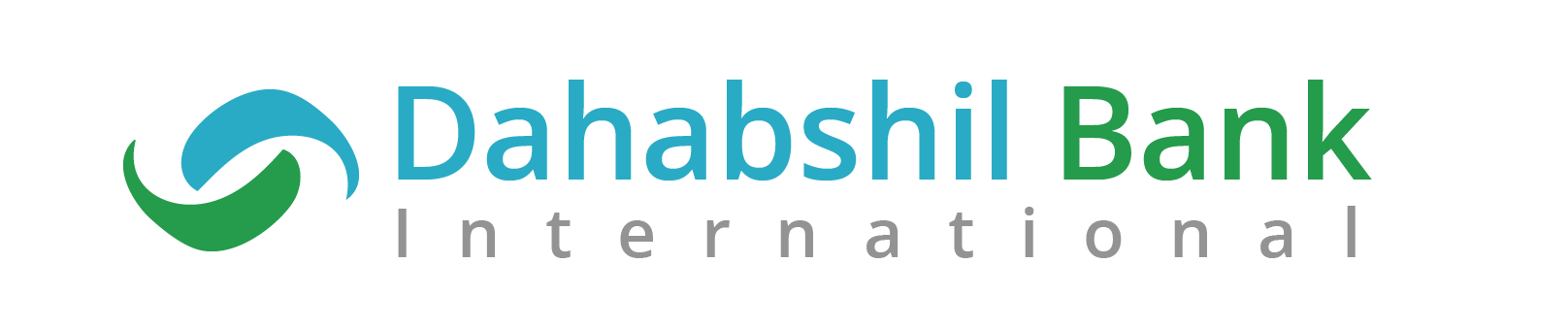
- Type: Subsidiary
- Industry: Banking and financial services
- Founded: 2014
- Headquarters: Hargeisa, Somaliland
- Key people: Abdirashid Mohamed Saed (Dahabshiil Manager)
- Products: Loans, commodities
- Owner: Dahabshiil
- Website: www.dahabshilbank.com

Dahabshil Bank International (DBI), also known as the Dahabshil International Commercial Bank, is a bank headquartered in Hargeisa, Somaliland.

Dahabshil Bank International is one of the main banks in Djibouti. It is a subsidiary of DGH Group Dahabshiil.

The bank has access to substantial foreign direct investment from the Persian Gulf region.

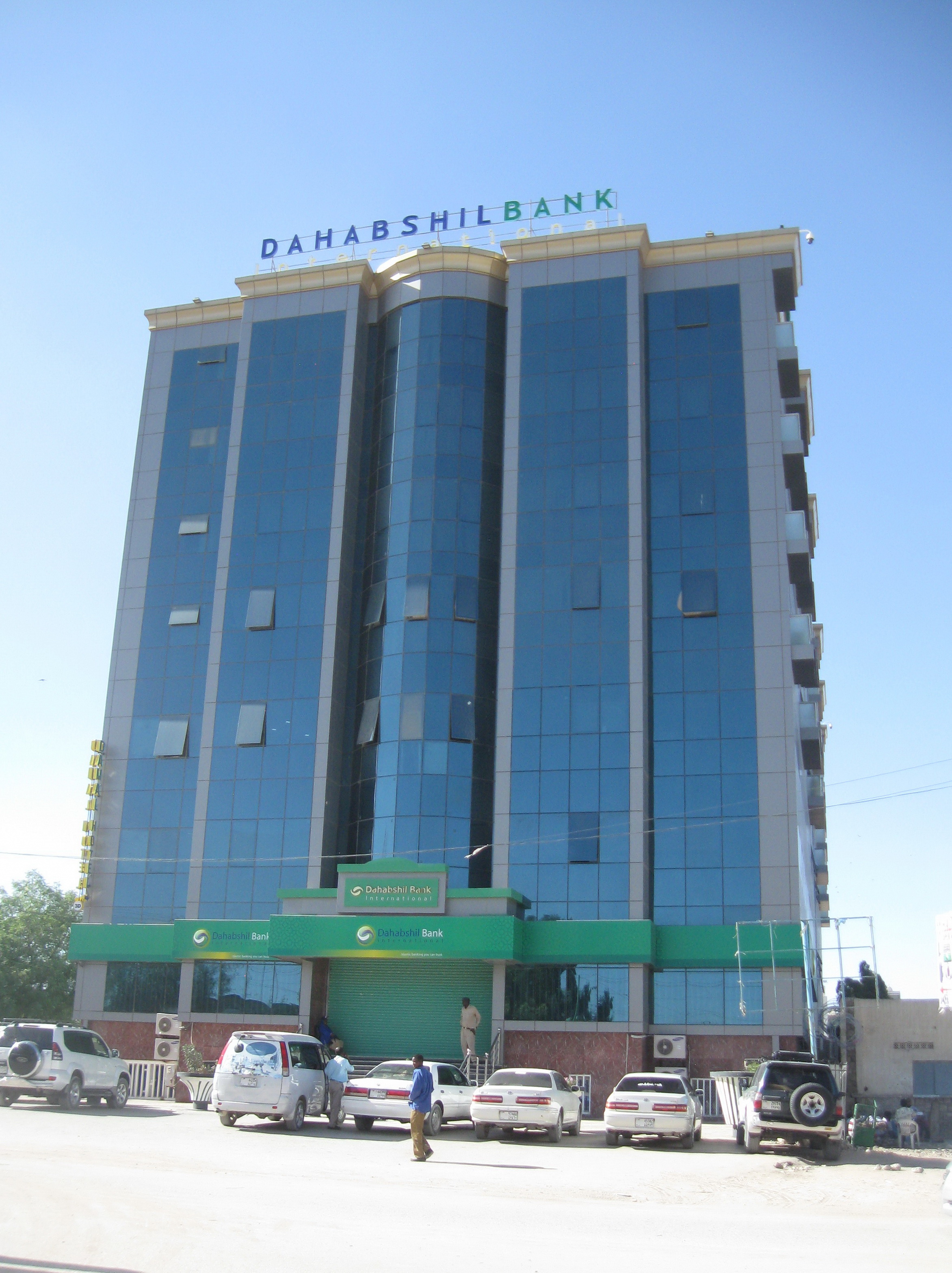
Dahabshil Bank International, Hargeisa Branch

== History ==
In early 2009, it became an officially recognized institution in Somaliland. The bank opened its first branch later the same year in Hargeysa, the capital of the country.

As of November 2014, Dahabshil Bank International has issued $70 million in loans earmarked for the local financial, livestock, agriculture, health and education sectors. According to Manager Abdirashid Mohamed Saed, the bank is slated to open additional branches in other parts of Somaliland.

== Services ==
The bank provides business and international banking, as well as personal and private banking to its clients. It also accommodates commodities exchange.

== Memberships ==
Dahabshil Bank international is a member of various international trading agencies and groups, including:

- Common Market for Eastern and Southern Africa
- Multilateral Investment Guarantee Agency

== See also ==
- List of banks in Somaliland
- Al Gamil
