= Air Djibouti =

Flag carrier of Djibouti

IATA	ICAO	Call sign
DJ	DJI	Delta Juliet
- Founded: April 1963
- Commenced operations: April 1964
- Hubs: Djibouti-Ambouli International Airport
- Headquarters: Djibouti
- Key people: Aboubaker Omar Hadi (Chairman)
- Website: www.air-djibouti.com

Air Djibouti, also known as Red Sea Airlines, is the flag carrier of Djibouti. It first flew in 1963 and ceased all operations in 2002. In 2015, the airline was relaunched, first as a cargo airline and then, in 2016, with passenger services as well. It is headquartered in the capital, Djibouti.

== History ==
=== Air Djibouti (1963–1970) ===
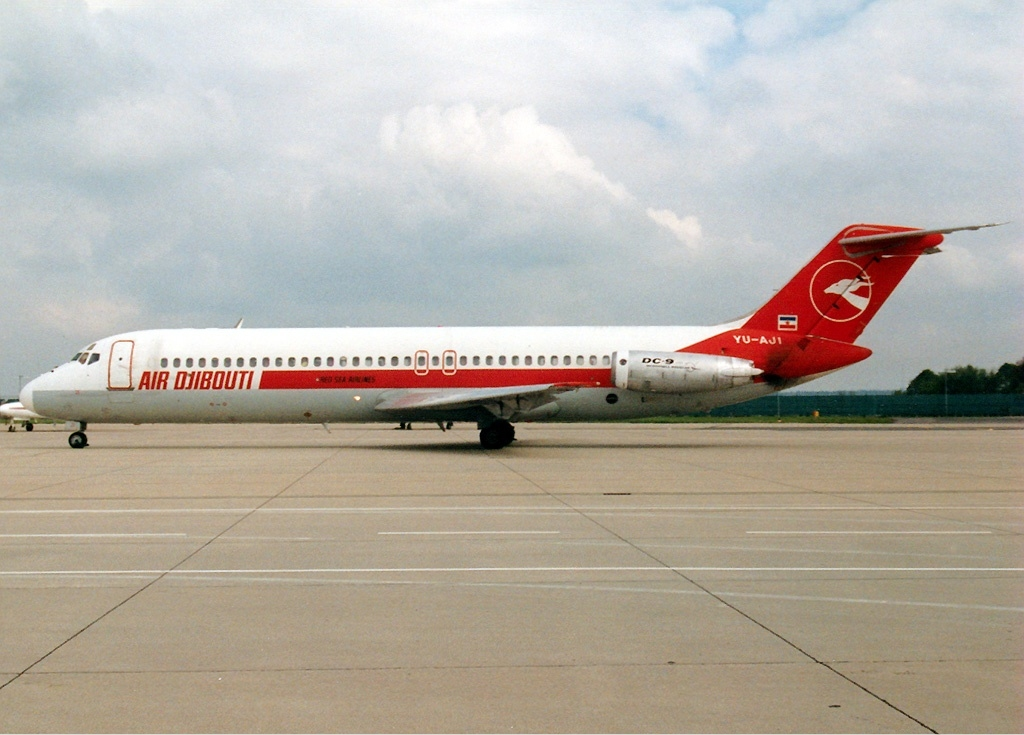
An Air Djibouti McDonnell Douglas DC-9 leased from JAT Yugoslav Airlines (1991).

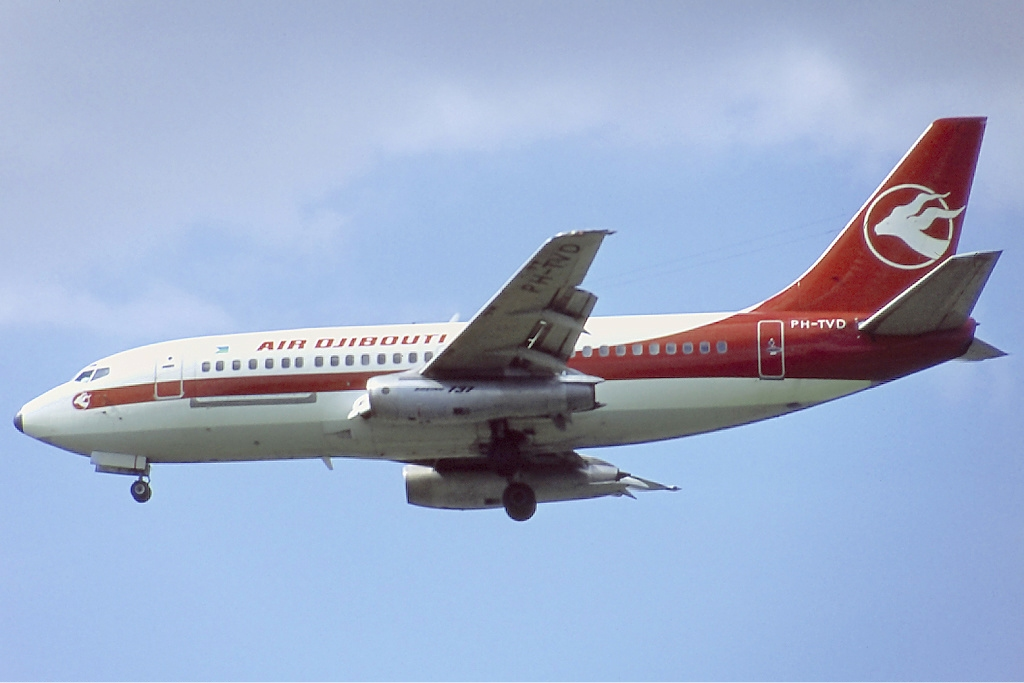
An Air Djibouti Boeing 737-200 at the Paris-Orly Airport (1980).

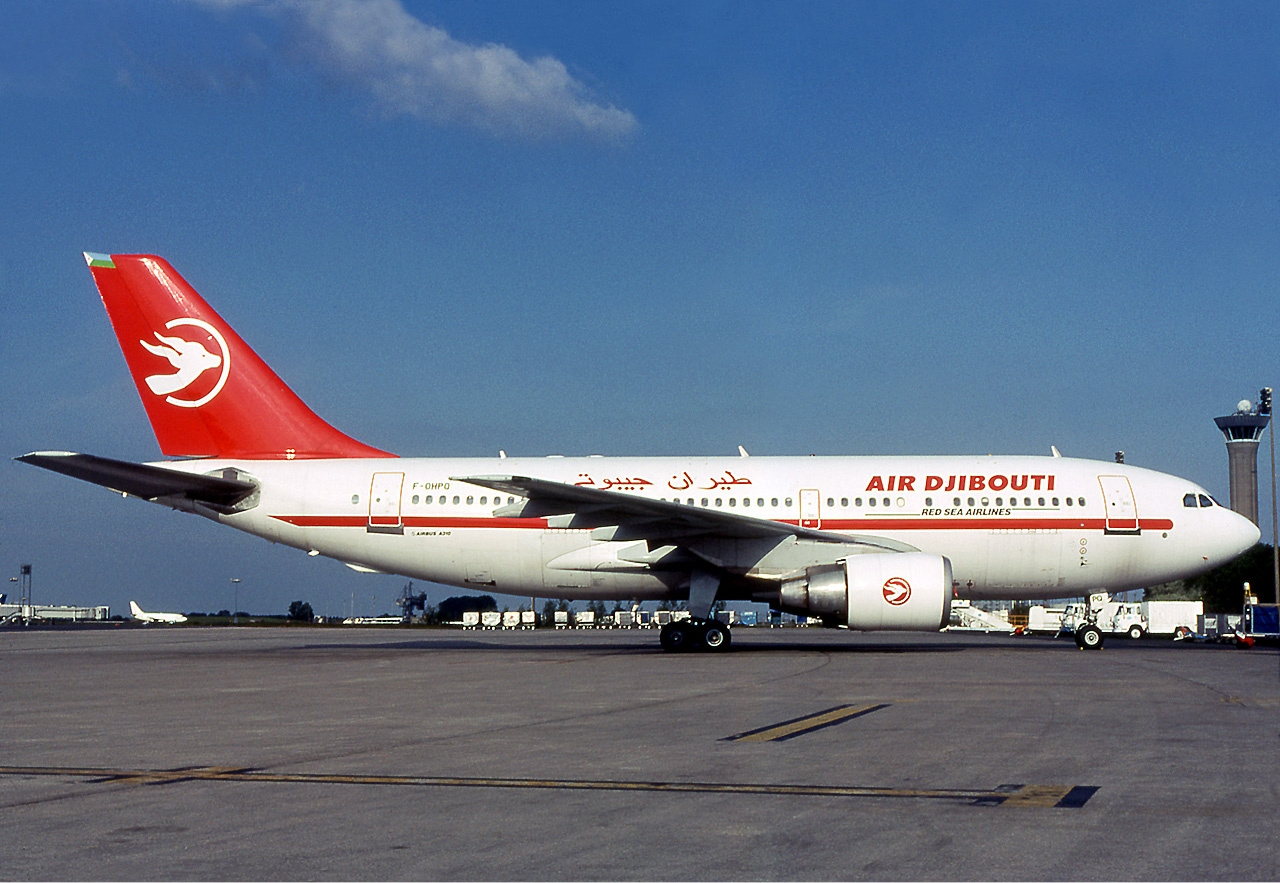
An Air Djibouti Airbus A310-200 at the Paris-Charles de Gaulle Airport (1999).

Air Djibouti was set up as Compagnie Territoriale de Transports Aériens de la Cote Française des Somalis in April 1963 by B. Astraud, who had been operating an air ambulance service in Madagascar and believed Djibouti was in condition to support an airline that would help boost the country's economy. Operations commenced in April 1964 with a fleet of a Bristol 170, a De Havilland Dragon Rapide and two Beechcraft Model 18 aircraft, initially serving Dikhil, Obock and Tadjoura. A brand new Douglas DC-3 helped the airline starting services between Dire Dawa and Aden, Addis Ababa and Taiz. The successfulness of this service prompted the airline to buy five more DC-3s from Air Liban, which rapidly replaced the smaller aircraft in the fleet. The carriage of mail and personal for the government and charter and Hajj flights complemented the carrier's revenues. A five-seater Aérospatiale Alouette III helicopter was purchased in 1969.

=== Air Djibouti–Red Sea Airlines (1971–2002) ===
Air Djibouti–Red Sea Airlines was formed in April 1971 as a result of Air Somalie (founded by Air France and Les Messagéries Maritimes in 1962) taking over the former Air Djibouti founded in 1963. In 1977, following the independence of Djibouti, the government boosted its participation in the carrier to 62.5%; Air France held 32.29% and banks and private investors held the balance. At July 1980, the number of employees was 210 and the fleet consisted of two Twin Otter aircraft. At this time, a domestic network was served along with international flights to Aden, Hodeida and Taiz; Addis Ababa, Cairo and Jeddah were also served in conjunction with Air France. With a fleet of two DC-9-30s and two Twin Otters, at March 1990 Air Djibouti had Abu Dhabi, Aden, Addis Ababa, Cairo, Dire Dawa, Hargeisa, Jeddah, Nairobi, Paris, Rome and Sanaa as part of the airline's international network, and flew domestically to Obock and Tadjoura. The president was Aden Robleh Awaleh, who employed 229. The airline ceased operations in 1991.

The carrier was refounded in 1997 and operations started again in July 1998 using a leased ex-Kuwait Airways 194-seater Airbus A310-200. At March 2000, the A310 was deployed on scheduled routes to Addis Ababa, Asmara, Cairo, Dar-es-Salaam, Dubai, Jeddah, Johannesburg, Karachi, Khartoum, Mogadishu, Mombasa, Muscat, Nairobi, Rome and Taiz. The enterprise went bankrupt in 2002.

=== Relaunch ===
Air Djibouti was set to relaunch service in late 2015 and 2016 with Chairman Aboubaker Omar Hadi and CEO Mario Fulgoni. The company is also supported by South Wales-based Cardiff Aviation. In October 2015 Air Djibouti relaunched service with a Fokker F27 freighter. The government wishes to establish the country as a regional logistics and commercial hub for trade in East Africa, and chose to relaunch the airline as part of this plan. In August 2016, the carrier phased in a Boeing 737-400. The airline started regional services with this aircraft on 16 August 2016 and planned to introduce two British Aerospace 146-300 aircraft before the end of 2016.

== Destinations ==
As of December 2019, Air Djibouti served the following destinations.

Country	City	Airport	Notes	Ref(s)
Djibouti	Djibouti City	Djibouti–Ambouli International Airport	Hub	
Ethiopia	Addis Ababa	Addis Ababa Bole International Airport	—	
Ethiopia	Dire Dawa	Dire Dawa International Airport	—	
Somalia	Mogadishu	Aden Adde International Airport	—	
Somalia	Hargeisa	Hargeisa Airport	—	
Yemen	Aden	Aden International Airport	—	

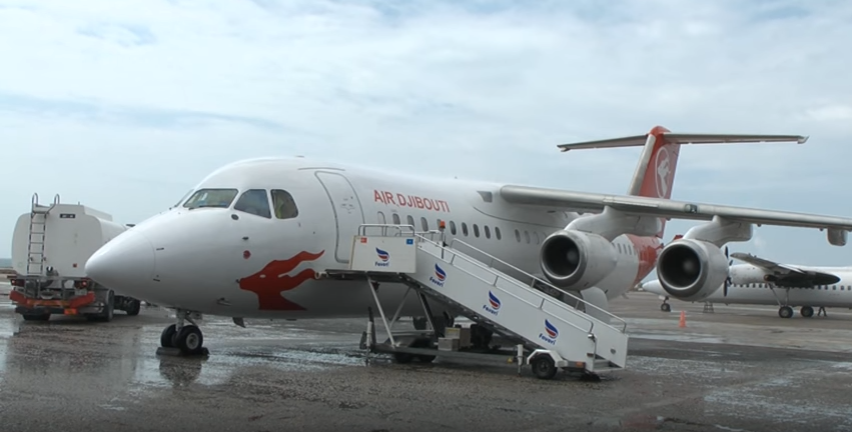
An Air Djibouti British Aerospace 146 at the Aden Adde International Airport (2016)

=== Interline agreements ===
Air Djibouti has interline agreements with the following airlines:

- Ethiopian Airlines
- Singapore Airlines

== Fleet ==
=== Current ===
Air Djibouti relaunched service in 2015 using a wet-leased Fokker 27. In 2016, the company leased a Boeing 737-400 from Cardiff Aviation, which was the first aircraft the new airline operated. Air Djibouti later entered a wet-lease for a BAe 146-300. By September 2017, all three aircraft had been returned to their lessors.

=== Historic fleet ===
In the 1960s, the airline operated Douglas DC-3s, a Beechcraft Model 18, and a Beechcraft Musketeer. In the early 1970s, the fleet also included a Douglas DC-6; the two Beechcraft aircraft had been replaced by a Bell JetRanger helicopter, and a Piper Cherokee Six.

Before operations were suspended Air Djibouti operated one Airbus A310 and five Boeing 737-200 aircraft.

== Accidents and incidents ==
- On 23 July 1969, an Air Djibouti Douglas C-47 (registered F-OCKT) ditched 9 nautical miles (17 km) off Djibouti after having collided with several cranes at an altitude of 300 feet (91 m). The aircraft was operating a domestic flight from Tadjoura Airport to Djibouti–Ambouli International Airport. All four people on board survived.
- On 17 October 1977, two gunmen entered an Air Djibouti de Havilland Canada DHC-6 Twin Otter at Tadjoura Airport shortly before the aircraft's planned take-off, shooting the pilot and one passenger.

== See also ==
- Transport in Djibouti

== Bibliography ==
- Guttery, Ben R. (1998). Encyclopedia of African Airlines. Jefferson, NC: McFarland & Company. ISBN 0-7864-0495-7.
