= Ambouli =

Ambouli أمبولي
- Town
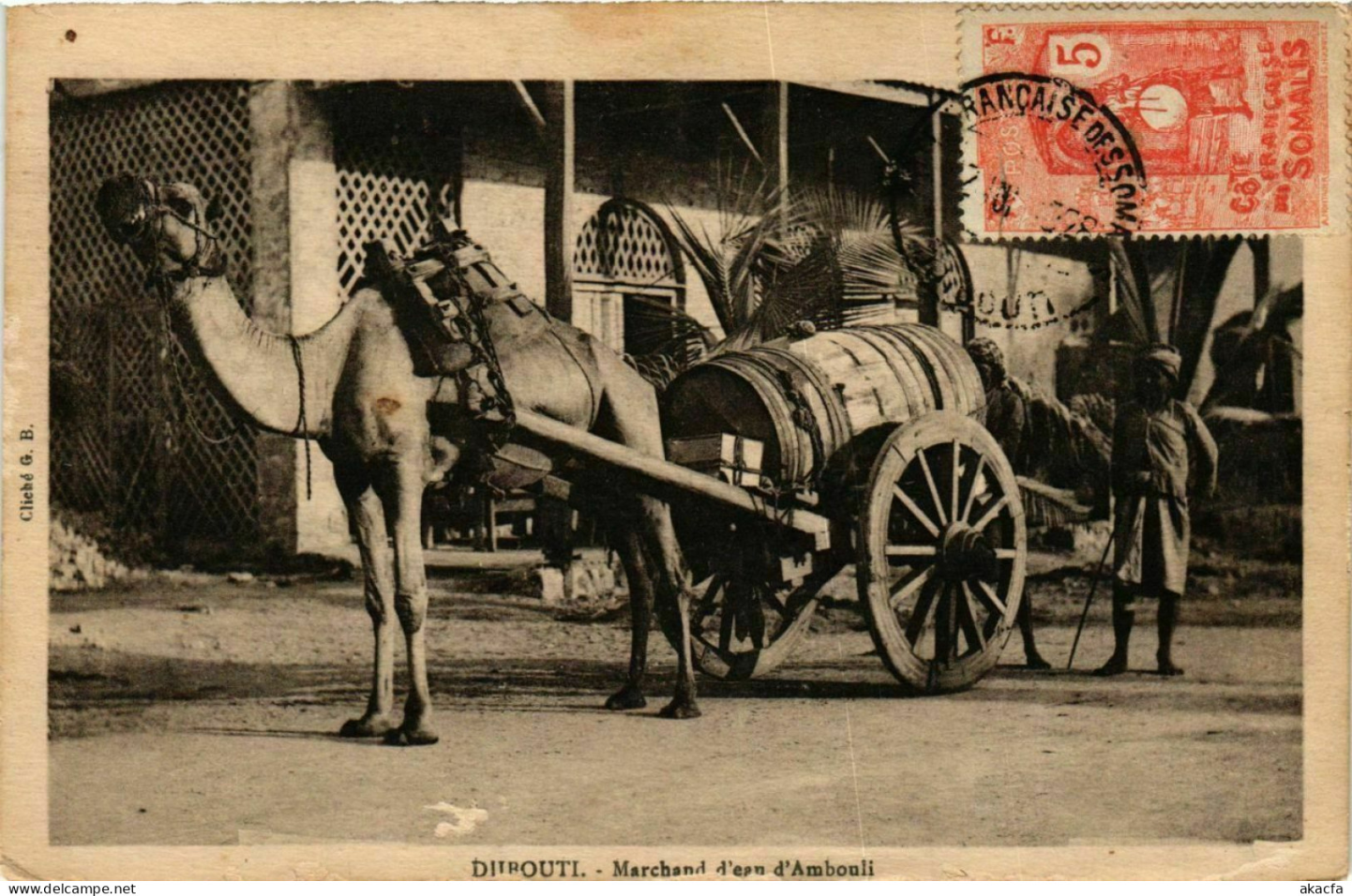
- A postcard displaying a local water-seller in Ambouli

- Location in Djibouti.
- Coordinates: 11°35′24″N 43°07′21″E
- Country: Djibouti
- Region: Djibouti
- Elevation: 13 m (43 ft)
- Time zone: UTC+3 (EAT)

Ambouli (Arabic: أمبولي) is a southern suburb of Djibouti, Djibouti.

== Overview ==
Located in the Djibouti region, O.G.S. Crawford identifies the city with Canbala. Canbala appears in Muhammad al-Idrisi's map of 1192 on the coast of the Horn of Africa, southeast of the straits of Bab-el-Mandeb, and with Cambaleh, a town where the Venetian traveler Bragadino, a thirteenth-century European visitor to Ethiopia, resided for eight years.

== Transportation ==
Since 1948 the town has been the site of Djibouti–Ambouli International Airport.
