= Premier Bank =

Bank in Somalia

Premier Bank Limited
- Company type: Private bank
- Industry: Banking; Financial services
- Founded: 2013; 13 years ago
- Headquarters: Premier Bank HQ Building, Makka al-Mukarama Street, Hodan District, Mogadishu, Somalia
- Area served: Somalia and Kenya
- Key people: Osman Duale (CEO); Jibril Hassan Mohamed (Chairman)
- Products: Retail banking, Private banking, Auto financing,
- Services: Savings, Hajj & Umrah Financing, Remittances from the diaspora, Current Account
- Website: www.premierbank.so

Premier Bank is a Somali privately owned Sharia compliant commercial bank. It was incorporated in Somalia in 2013 and licensed by the Central Bank of Somalia in 2014.

It was the first bank in Somalia to allow MasterCard credit cards and partner with Visa.

== History ==
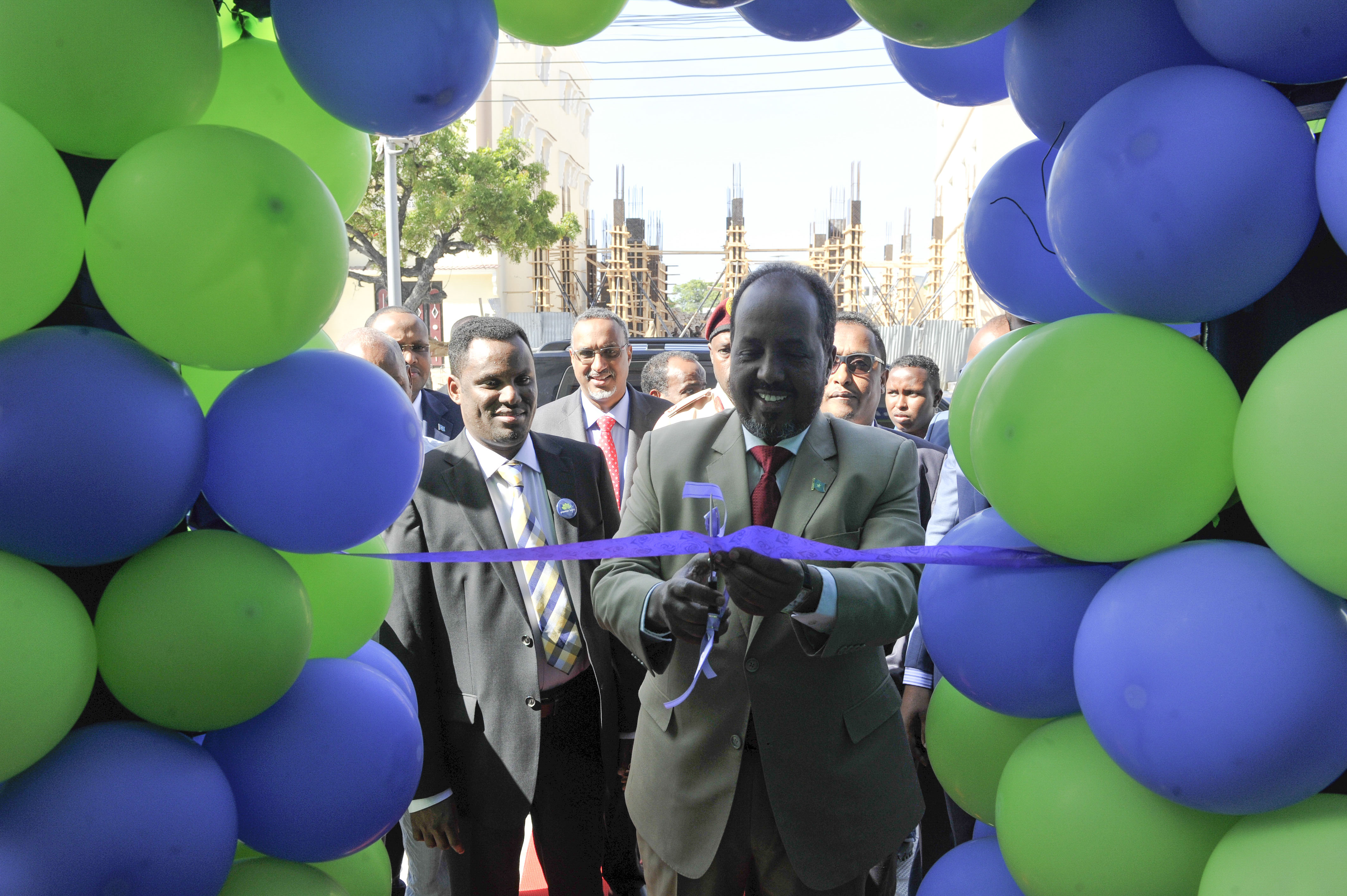
At the ribbon cutting for Premier Bank, Somali President Hasan Sheikh Mohamud is joined by other officials during the opening ceremony in Mogadishu, Somalia, on 21 May 2015.

Premier Bank was opened on May 21, 2015 according to Sharia law by private Somali investors with banking experience from South Sudan, Djibouti and Kenya. The bank's official opening ceremony was opened by former Somali President Hassan Sheikh Mohamud.

The bank has branches in Mogadishu as well as Hargeysa, Somaliland.

Premier Bank in partnership with MasterCard and SWIFT provides to its local clients for global online financial services.

Premier Bank's chairman, Jibril Hassan Mohamud announced during the Mogadishu Tech Summit 2018 a fund of one million dollars for Somali tech startups.
