= Djibouti–Ambouli International Airport =

International airport in Ambouli, Djibouti

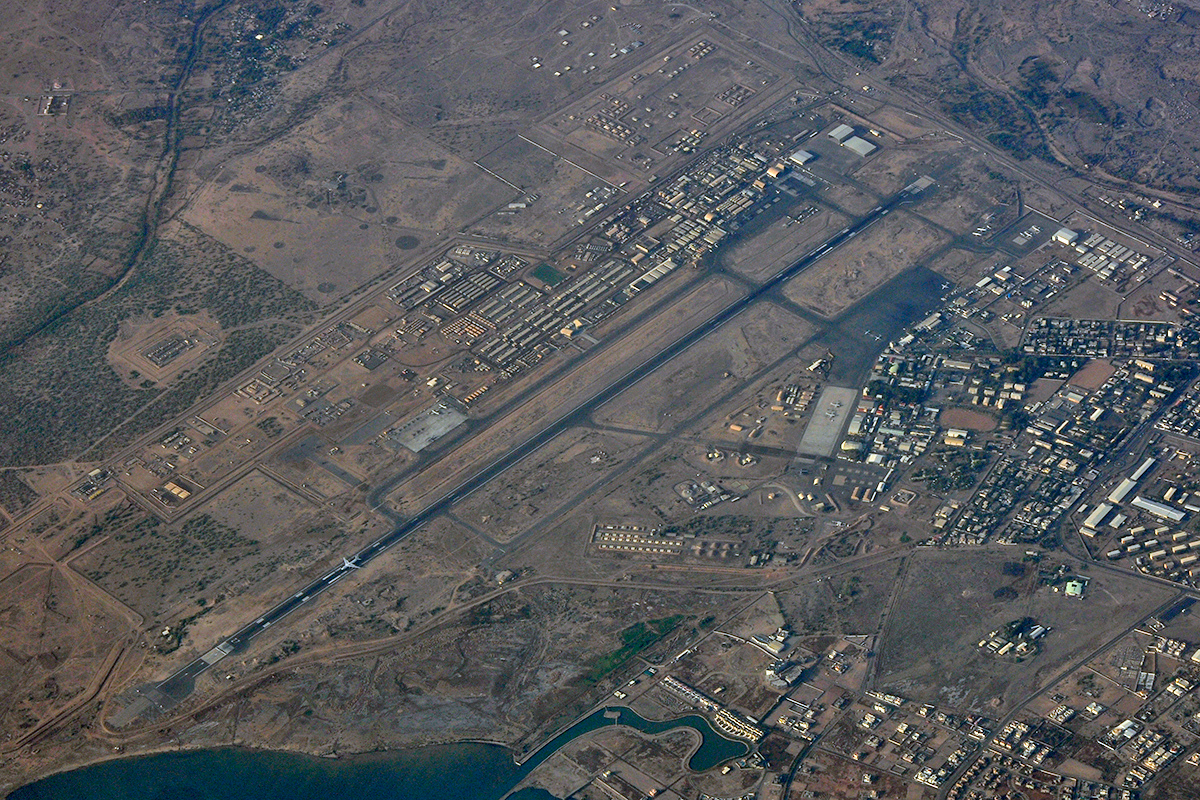
- IATA: JIB; ICAO: HDAM

Summary
- Airport type: Joint (Civil and Military)
- Operator: Djibouti Airports Authority
- Serves: Djibouti
- Location: Ambouli, Djibouti
- Hub for: Air Djibouti, Ethiopian Airlines (Logistically)
- Elevation AMSL: 49 ft (15 m)
- Coordinates: 11°32′46.53″N 43°09′33.14″E

Map
- Location in Djibouti, Djibouti JIB (Africa)

Runways
Direction	Length		Surface
Direction	ft	m	Surface
09/27	10,335	3,150	Asphalt

Statistics (2009)
- Passengers: 258,877

Djibouti–Ambouli International Airport (Note: Arabic: مطار جيبوتي الدولي; French: Aéroport international de Ambouli) (IATA: JIB, ICAO: HDAM) is a joint civilian/military-use airport situated in the town of Ambouli, Djibouti. It serves the national capital, Djibouti. The airport is located approximately 6 kilometres (4 miles) from the city centre. It occupies an area of 10 square kilometers.

== History ==
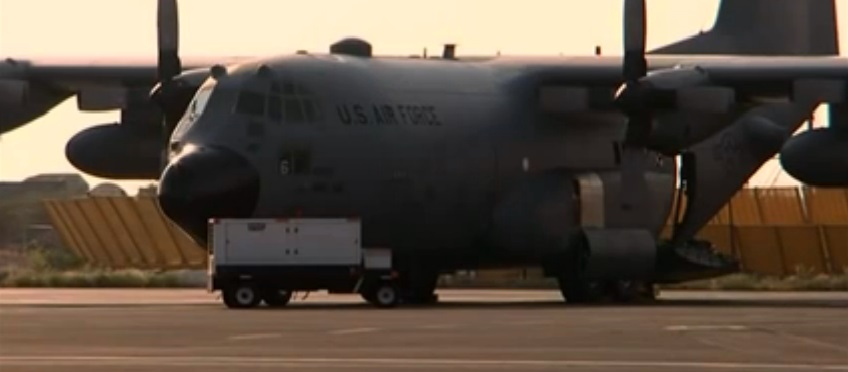
U.S. Air Force, C-130 Hercules at Djibouti International Airport

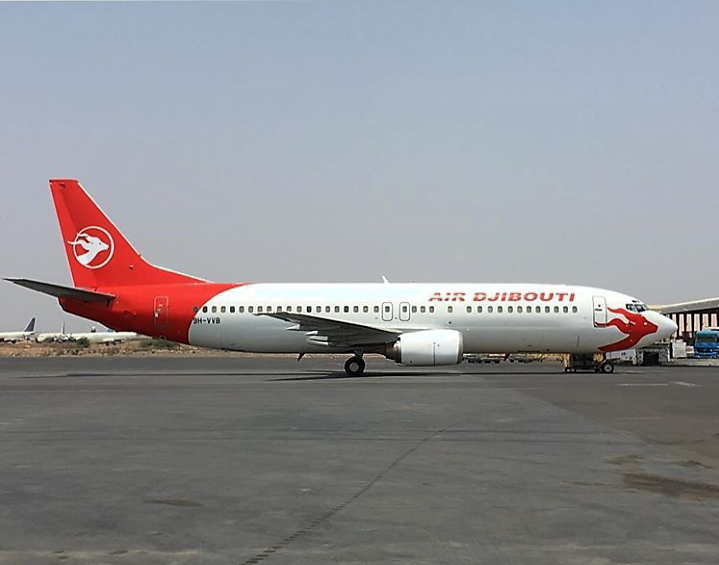
An Air Djibouti Boeing 737 aircraft at the Djibouti–Ambouli International Airport (2016)

In 1948, a hard runway and an air terminal were built on the Ambouli site, marking the creation of air base 188 in 1948, which was made official in July 1949. The runway was lengthened in the sixties, the facility grew in the post-independence period after a series of renovation projects.

In the mid-1970s, the airport was enlarged to accommodate more international carriers, with the state-owned Air Djibouti providing regular trips to its various destinations.

== Civilian use ==
Djibouti–Ambouli International Airport has a single terminal building, with one departure gate and one baggage carousel.

As the airport is located south of Djibouti City and its runways run east–west, an airliner's landing approach is usually directly over the conurbation of the capital, when the wind is from the west.

In 2010, the airport served 176,861 passengers.

== Military use ==
In addition to its use as a civilian airport, the airport hosts a military presence from a number of countries. Military traffic makes up approximately 75% of the airport's total traffic volume.

- Military of France
  - French Army 5th Overseas Interarms Regiment
  - French Army Light Aviation, 2 Puma and 1 Gazelle helicopter
  - French Air and Space Force (BA 188)
    - Escadron de Chasse 3/11 Corse with the Dassault Mirage 2000-5
    - Escadron de Transport 88 Larzac with the Aérospatiale SA 330 Puma and CASA/IPTN CN-235
- United States Armed Forces (Combined Joint Task Force-Horn of Africa)
  - Camp Lemonnier – formerly a base of the French Foreign Legion, the camp is located on the southern side of the airfield
- Djibouti Air Force – located on the southwest side of the airfield.
- Japan Self-Defense Forces
  - Japan Self-Defense Force Base Djibouti was established in 2009 on a 12 ha site adjacent to the airport; two P-3C aircraft and 180 personnel are stationed here. This is the only JSDF base located outside Japan, and is intended to protect Japanese nationals and ships in the region from terrorism and piracy.
- Italian Air Force
  - Supporting the European Union Naval Force – operating the General Atomics MQ-1 Predator.

=== Air-traffic controllers controversy ===
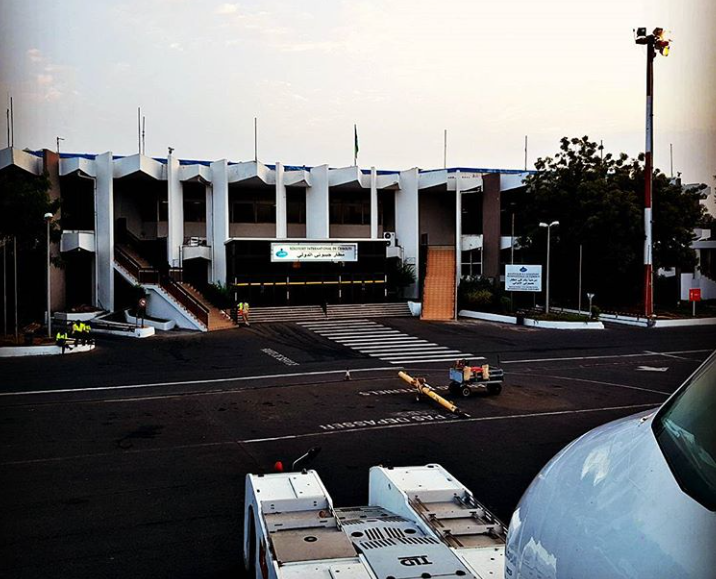
Apron View

According to military officials, US military flights comprised over 50 percent of the 30,000 departures and arrivals in 2014. Civilian air-traffic controllers hired by the Djiboutian government monitor the airspace, unlike other major US military bases. US consultants stationed at the base reported that over a three-month period, the controllers made an average of 2,378 errors per 100,000 aircraft operations, an error rate reportedly 1,700 times greater than the US standard. US federal aviation experts suggested that an unprofessional attitude on the part of the controllers potentially imperiled American military and civilian flights to and from the airport. In 2013, FAA officials asserted that the controllers' lax attitude, which allegedly included barring drones from taking off or landing, stemmed from a belief on their part that the US drones were unreliable aircraft and dangerous weapons aimed at killing Muslims.

The Djibouti government dismissed the air controller safety allegations as exaggerations or fabrications. US Ambassador to Djibouti Tom Kelly likewise indicated that, after asking for further improvements in aviation, progress was being registered at the airport. U.S. Navy Captain Kevin Bertelsen, the commanding officer at Camp Lemonnier, described work at the air base as challenging, but similarly indicated that conditions there had been ameliorated. In 2014, the US government also signed a new twenty-year lease with the Djibouti authorities to maintain its military base at the airport.

In 2014, U.S. Navy air traffic controllers have been volunteering their time to teach English to new Djibouti controllers, and this collaborative initiative has seen tremendous safety improvements over the past few years.

== Airlines and destinations ==
=== Passenger ===
Airlines	Destinations
Air Djibouti	Addis Ababa, Aden, Hargeisa, Mogadishu
Air France	Paris–Charles de Gaulle
Egyptair	Cairo, Mogadishu
Ethiopian Airlines	Addis Ababa,
Flydubai	Dubai–International
Flynas	Jeddah
Jubba Airways	Bosaso, Hargeisa, Jeddah
Turkish Airlines	Istanbul
Yemenia	Aden

=== Cargo ===
Airlines	Destinations
Air Djibouti	Addis Ababa, Dubai–Al Maktoum, Hargeisa, Mogadishu
Coyne Airways	Dubai–International
Emirates SkyCargo	Dubai–Al Maktoum
Ethiopian Airlines Cargo	Addis Ababa, Nanjing
