= Silver Air (Djibouti) =

Charter airline in Djibouti

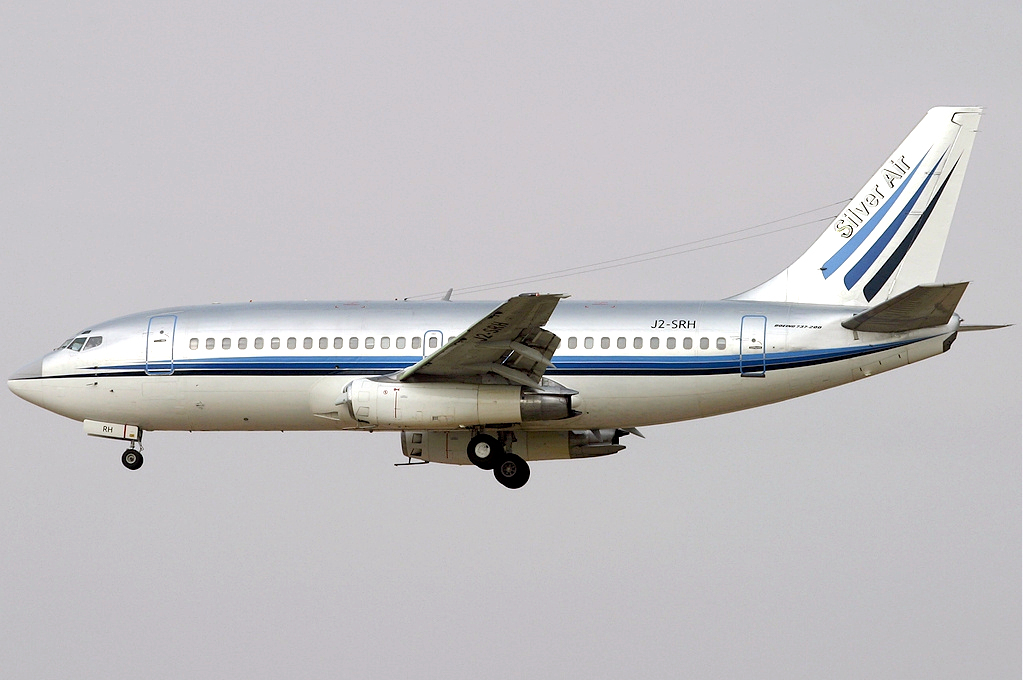
IATA	ICAO	Call sign
-	SVJ	-
- Founded: 2004
- Ceased operations: 2009
- Fleet size: 4
- Destinations: 20
- Headquarters: Djibouti, Djibouti

Silver Air was a charter airline based in Djibouti city, the capital of Djibouti. It ceased operations in 2009.

== Fleet ==
As of 20 July 2009, the Silver Air fleet consisted of the following aircraft 20 July 2009:

- 2 Boeing 737-200
- 2 Boeing 737-300
