= Ethiopia–Russia relations =

- Ethiopia: Russia

Ethiopia and the Soviet Union established diplomatic relations on April 21, 1943. Russia currently has an embassy in Addis Ababa, and Ethiopia has an embassy in Moscow. The Ethiopian ambassador to Russia is also accredited to Armenia, Azerbaijan, Belarus, Georgia, Kazakhstan, Kyrgyzstan, Moldova, Tajikistan, Turkmenistan, Ukraine, and Uzbekistan.

== History ==
=== Pre-Soviet Union ===
==== Early contacts ====
The first contacts between Russians and Ethiopians took place in the Palestine, where Russian pilgrims met the Ethiopian religious community. Around 1370, the Russian pilgrim Agrefeny described the performance of Ethiopian rites in the Church of the Holy Sepulchre. In the 1470s, Afanasy Nikitin passed through what is today Eritrea on his way back from India, becoming the first Russian to set foot in Ethiopian lands.

==== Imperial history ====
The history of this relationship has its origins in the 19th century. Russia's first steps in the Horn of Africa were taken by a Cossack adventurer named N.I. Ashinov, who illegally without any support from the Tsar attempted to establish a "New Moscow" at the coastal town of Sagallo in modern-day Djibouti, with the expectation that a Russian community there would force the Tsar to come to protect and lay claim to it. This short-lived settlement came to an end in February 1889 when French authorities attacked the out-post after Russia denied any official link to them, the 175 Russian settlers were then forcibly removed by a Russian Naval ship detachment that was set to collect them. Nikolay Ashinov was then imprisoned for disobeying the Tsar, who had no interest in forming colonies or engaging in the slave trade in Africa, that was the domain of Turkish Ottoman and European Empires. While Ashinov had never received any support from the Russian Tsar, a delegation led by V.F. Mashkov to Emperor Menelik II in October 1889 was official. Mashkov discussed arms supply, technology and diplomatic support supply deals to Ethiopia with the Ethiopian emperor, and upon returning to Russia he was decorated by the Tsar for successfully establishing ties. Mashkov made a second visit to Ethiopia early in 1891 under the sponsorship of the Imperial Russian Geographical Society. Paul Henze notes that the reasons of Mashkov's visits were "no doubt political, but the fact that both countries were Orthodox encouraged favorable attitudes on both sides."

During the First Italo-Ethiopian War, Russia was the sole European power that offered diplomatic support to Ethiopia.

A permanent Russian diplomatic presence was established in Addis Ababa in 1902.

=== Soviet Union ===
==== Early Soviet relations ====
The Soviet Union under Joseph Stalin did not send any aid to Ethiopia during the Second Italo-Ethiopian War, and continued trading with Italy during the conflict in spite of sanctions the Soviets themselves officially supported, but the USSR was one of only five nations which never acknowledged Italy's occupation of Ethiopia. Official diplomatic relations between the USSR and Ethiopia were established on 21 April 1943 during World War II.

==== 1974 revolution ====
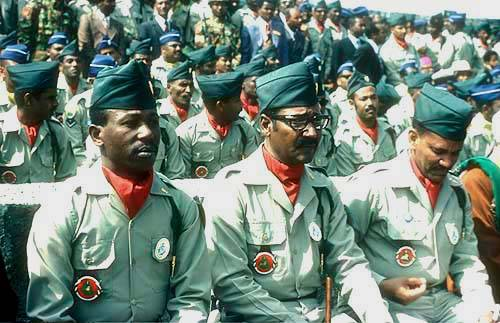
After came to power, Derg military junta built close relations and alliance with Soviet Union.

Ethiopia established friendly relations with the Soviet Union following a 1974 uprising that forced the long serving Emperor Haile Selassie to cede power to a military council called the Derg ("Committee" in Ge'ez). Despite the implementation of a series of radical socio-economic reforms, Moscow was slow to embrace the new regime for several reasons. First, the Derg continued the old regime's policy of buying arms from the United States. Second, the Soviet Union was reluctant to jeopardize its growing relationship with Somalia, Ethiopia's traditional enemy. Third, a significant segment of the Soviet leadership was skeptical of the revolutionary credentials of the Derg, as Moscow perceived a significant number of its members to be pro-Western.

Soviet backing for the Derg increased as Major Mengistu Haile Mariam emerged as its most powerful member. In 1975, the first group of officers from the regime traveled to the Soviet Union for ideological training, including Lt. Colonel Fikre-Selassie Wogderess, who would later become Mengistu's second in command. Soviet media ran positive portrayals of the Derg and of Mengistu in particular. After the execution of Mengistu's rival, Major Sisal Habte, Soviet support for the regime grew substantially, beginning with a secret $100 million arms deal in December 1976. In May 1977, Mengistu traveled to Moscow to sign a "Declaration on the Principles of Friendly Relations and Cooperation" and to conclude a second arms deal worth about $385 million.

==== Ogaden War ====
Moscow's public embrace of Mengistu concerned Siad Barre's regime in Somalia, who worried about the implications of friendly Soviet-Ethiopian relations on their own alliance with the USSR. After rejecting a Soviet proposal for a four-nation Marxist–Leninist confederation, the Somali government launched an offensive in July 1977 with the intent of capturing Ethiopia's Ogaden region, starting the Ogaden War. Though Somalia appeared to be on the brink of victory after gaining control of 90% of the area, the Ethiopians were able to launch a counter offensive with the help of newly arrived Soviet arms and a South Yemeni brigade. Infuriated by Soviet support for the Ethiopians, Somalia annulled its treaty with the Soviet Union and expelled all Soviet advisors in the country. Consequently, the USSR orchestrated a massive transport of armaments, Cuban combat troops and Soviet military advisors to Ethiopia. By March 1978, Somali forces had been pushed out of the Ogaden.

==== 1978–1985 ====
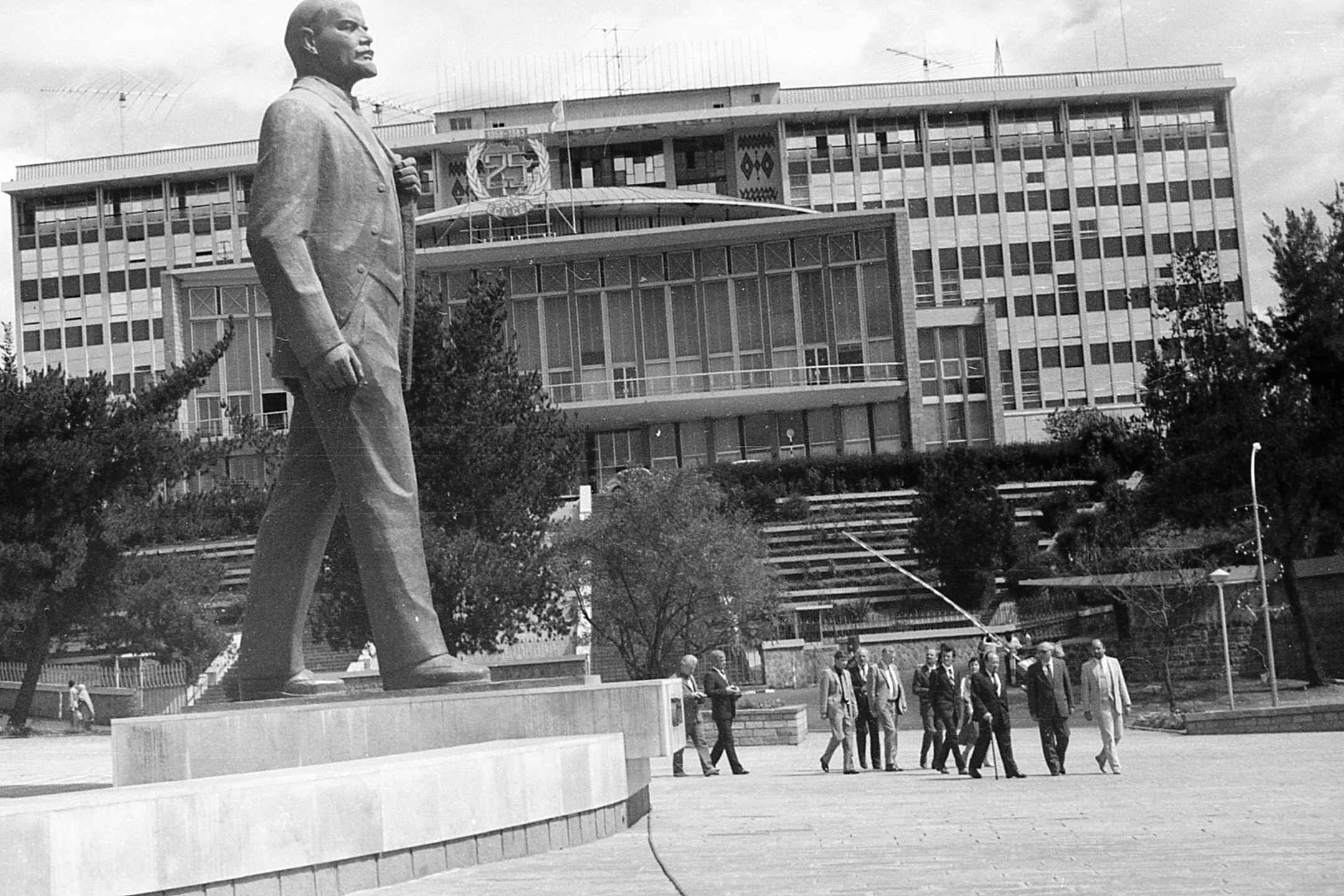
A statue of Lenin stands in Addis Ababa 1983

Following the Ogaden War, the Soviet Union strengthened its ties to Ethiopia. Moscow provided the Derg with more than $11 billion in military aid, leading to the creation of the largest army in sub-Saharan Africa. Soviet support was critical in the continuing suppression of Eritrean and Tigrean separatists. The USSR established naval, air and land bases in Ethiopia, notably facilities for naval reconnaissance flights in Asmara. Politically, the Soviet Union pushed Mengistu to develop a "national-democratic" regime, along the lines of the Eastern European countries. This was something he did reluctantly, as the Workers' Party of Ethiopia was not established until 1984. Economically, the Soviets provided limited credits to develop basic industries such as utilities. A significant number of Soviet professionals such as doctors and engineers also traveled to Ethiopia.

==== Soviet "new thinking" ====
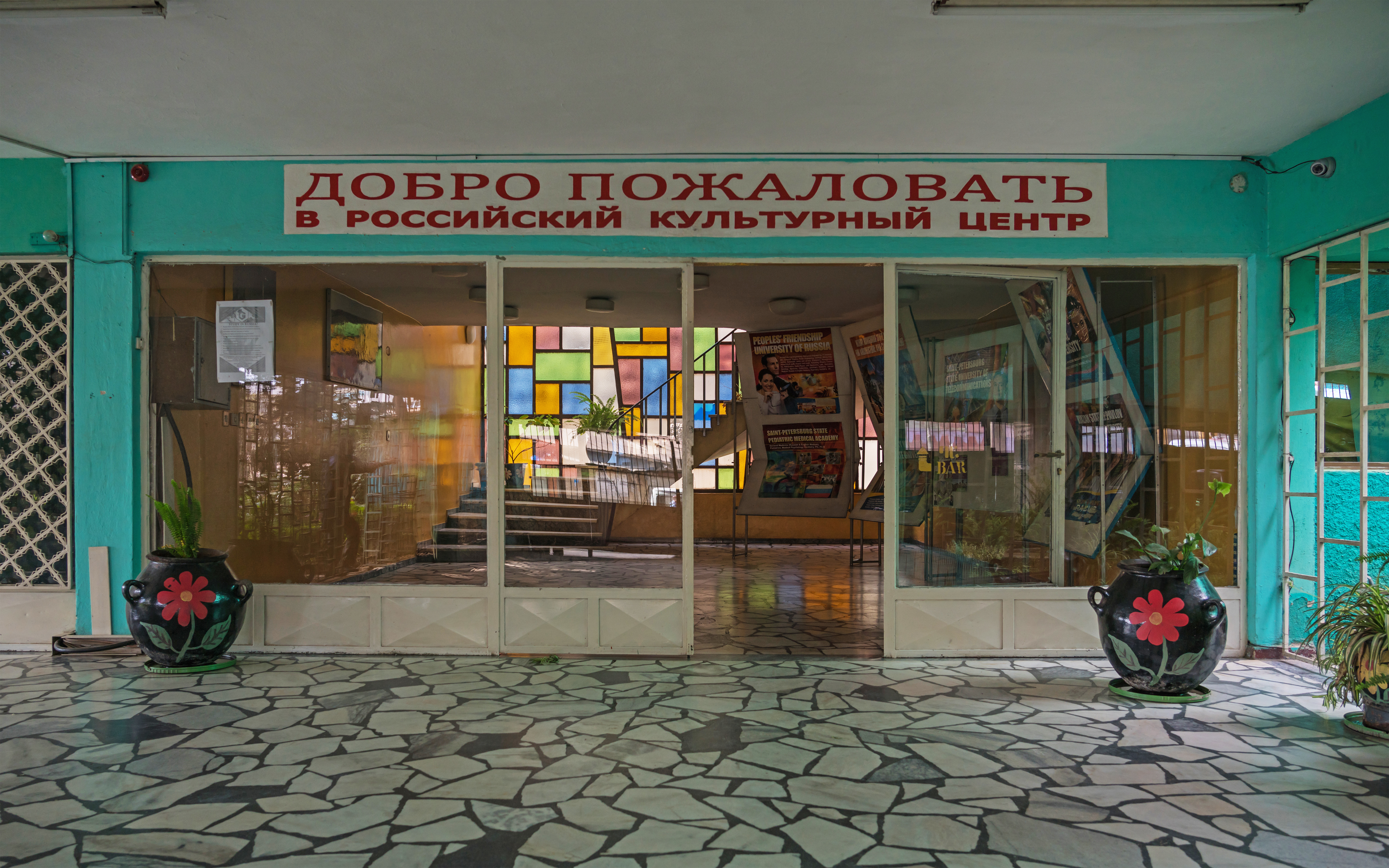
The Russian Cultural Centre in Addis Ababa

Soviet policy towards Ethiopia remained relatively unchanged until the accession of Mikhail Gorbachev to General Secretary of the Communist Party of the Soviet Union in 1985. The new Soviet leader sought to reduce east–west tensions in order to pursue domestic political and economic reforms. To this end, Gorbachev called for "the just political settlement of international crisis and regional conflicts" at the 27th Congress of the Communist Party in March 1986. Soviet intellectuals began to question Moscow's support of socialist leaders who did not have popular support. Gorbachev's de-ideologization of Soviet foreign relations led many Soviet observers to view Mengistu less as the leader of a Leninist vanguard and more as an ineffective dictator struggling to maintain power at Moscow's expense.

Signs of Gorbachev's "new thinking" were evident in Ethiopian relations as early as 1986, when the Soviets pressured Mengistu to agree to face-to-face talks with Somalia's Siad Barre that resulted in the signing of peace accords in 1988. Similarly, Moscow indicated to Mengistu that the arms agreement reached in November 1987 was to be the last of its kind. Despite the urging of Soviet advisers, Mengistu resisted implementing political and economic reforms and banned discussion of perestroika and glasnost from Ethiopian media. It was not until the collapse of the hardline communist regimes in Eastern Europe in late 1989 that Mengistu proposed limited economic liberalization.

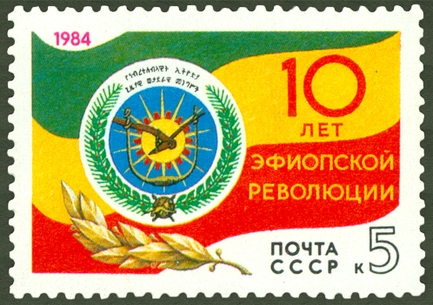
Soviet postage stamp marking the 10th anniversary of the Ethiopian revolution.

The drop of substantial Soviet military support after 1987 had consequences. Eritrean and Tigrean insurgents began to make advances, placing the Addis regime in an increasingly tenuous position. By mid-1989, Moscow was significantly cutting back weapon deliveries and advised Mengistu to seek a negotiated settlement. In July 1989, the head of the Soviet Foreign Ministry's African Department, Yuri Yukalov, met with Eritrean representatives in London in an attempt to advance the peace process. In September 1989, the Soviet Deputy Minister of Defense, General V. Varennikov, delivered a message to Mengistu from Gorbachev confirming Moscow's decision to end military aid to Ethiopia. In early 1990, the Soviet Union sought to further its disengagement from Ethiopia by welcoming the entry of the United States into the diplomatic process. This included mediation between the regime and the Eritrea People's Liberation Front by American Assistant Secretary of State for African Affairs Herman Cohen. These talks collapsed when the Ethiopian insurgents, under the umbrella grouping known as the Ethiopian People's Revolutionary Democratic Front, advanced into the capital and overthrew the regime in May 1991, forcing Mengistu into exile in Zimbabwe.

== Current relations ==
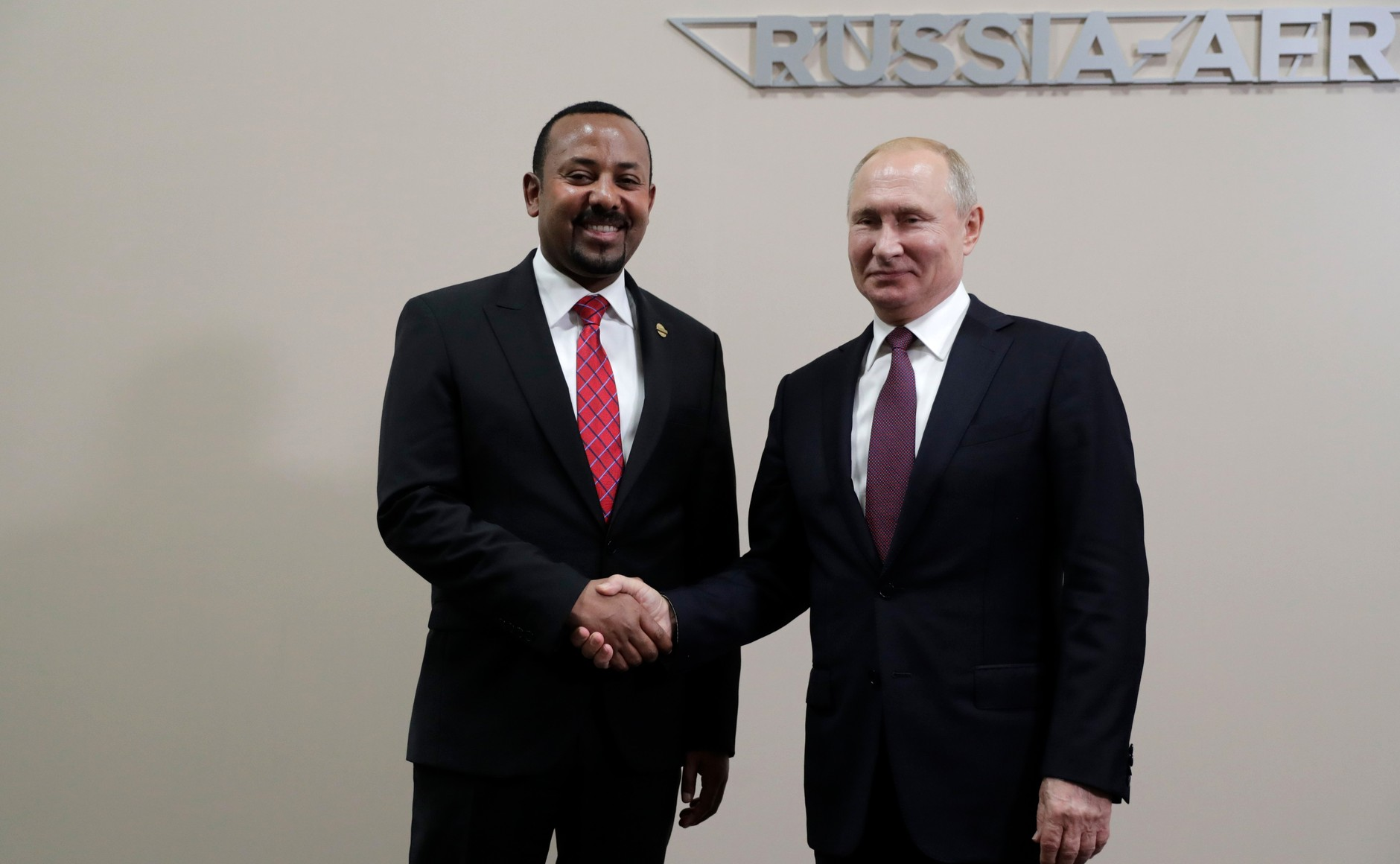
Ethiopian Prime Minister Abiy Ahmed and Russian President Vladimir Putin at the Russia-Africa Summit in Sochi in October 2019

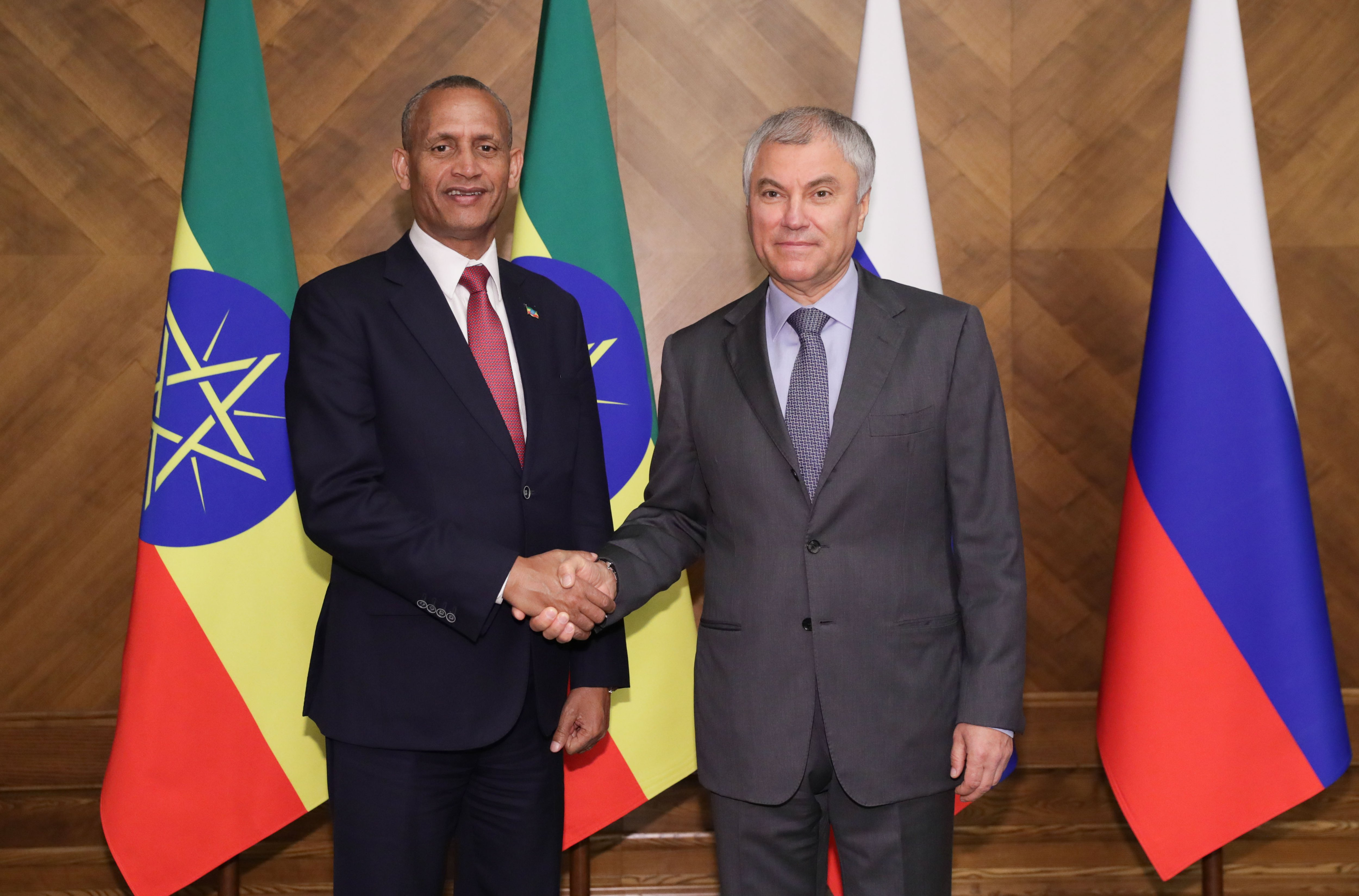
Agegnehu Teshager with Chairman of the State Duma Vyacheslav Volodin in Moscow, Russia, 19 May 2023

During the Ethiopian-Eritrean War of the 1990s, Russia provided fighter jets and pilots to the then Ethiopian Air Force.

During the Tigray War, Russian Foreign Minister Lavrov said the issue was an internal affair of Ethiopia and that Russia supported the Ethiopian government's efforts. The two sides also expressed the need to strengthen exchanges and cooperation in the fields of education, science and technology.

=== Relations since the Russian invasion of Ukraine ===
Ethiopia abstained in the UN vote condemning Russia's invasion of Ukraine, Ethiopians also queued up to volunteer for Russia's side during the Russo-Ukrainian War.

On August 23, 2023, at the 15th BRICS summit, Russia along with the other members of BRICS formally invited Ethiopia to join the organization. Ethiopia became a full member on January 1, 2024.

In November 2022, Ethiopia was one of 13 countries that voted against United Nations General Assembly Resolution ES-11/5 which calls for Russia to pay war reparations to Ukraine by creating an international reparations mechanism.

In April 2022, Ethiopia voted against expelling Russia from the United Nations Human Rights Council.

In September 2025, Ethiopia and Russia signed a document calling for the planning and construction of a nuclear power plant in the country, in a collaboration with Russia's nuclear corporation Rosatom.

== Official visits ==
Visiting leader	Hosting leader	Location	Date	Notes
(Ethiopian Empire) Emperor Haile Selassie	(Soviet Union) Chairman Kliment Voroshilov	Moscow, Soviet Union	July 1959	First visit by an Ethiopian leader to Russia. He was awarded the 1st Class of the Order of Suvorov during the visit. He also met with Patriarch Alexy I of Moscow.
(Ethiopian Empire) Emperor Haile Selassie	(Soviet Union) Chairman Leonid Brezhnev	Moscow, Soviet Union	October 1967	
(Ethiopia) Lieutenant Colonel Mengistu Haile Mariam	(Soviet Union) Chairman Leonid Brezhnev	Moscow, Soviet Union	May 1977	He signed the "Declaration on the Principles of Friendly Relations and Cooperation."
(Ethiopia) Lieutenant Colonel Mengistu Haile Mariam	(Soviet Union) Chairman Leonid Brezhnev	Moscow, Soviet Union	November 1980	1980 October Revolution Parade
(Ethiopia) Prime Minister Meles Zenawi	(Russia) President Vladimir Putin	Moscow, Russia	December 2001	A declaration on cooperation was renewed.
(Ethiopia) Prime Minister Abiy Ahmed	(Russia) President Vladimir Putin	Sochi, Russia	23 October 2019	Participated in the inaugural Russia–Africa Summit.
(Ethiopia) Prime Minister Abiy Ahmed	(Russia) President Vladimir Putin	Saint Petersburg	July 2023	Participated in the Russia–Africa Summit.

== See also ==
- Soviet Union-Africa relations
- List of ambassadors of Russia to Ethiopia

== Russians in Ethiopia ==
- Leonid Artamonov
- Nikolay Leontiev
- Nikolay Gumilev
- Alexander Bulatovich was a Russian military officer, explorer of Ethiopia, writer, hieromonk and the leader of the imiaslavie movement in Eastern Orthodox Christianity.
- - Who is the count Аbay?
- Cossacks of the emperor Menelik II
- Диссертация "Российско-эфиопские дипломатические и культурные связи в конце XIX-начале XX веков"
