= Military history of Ethiopia =

Overview of Ethiopia's involvement in military history

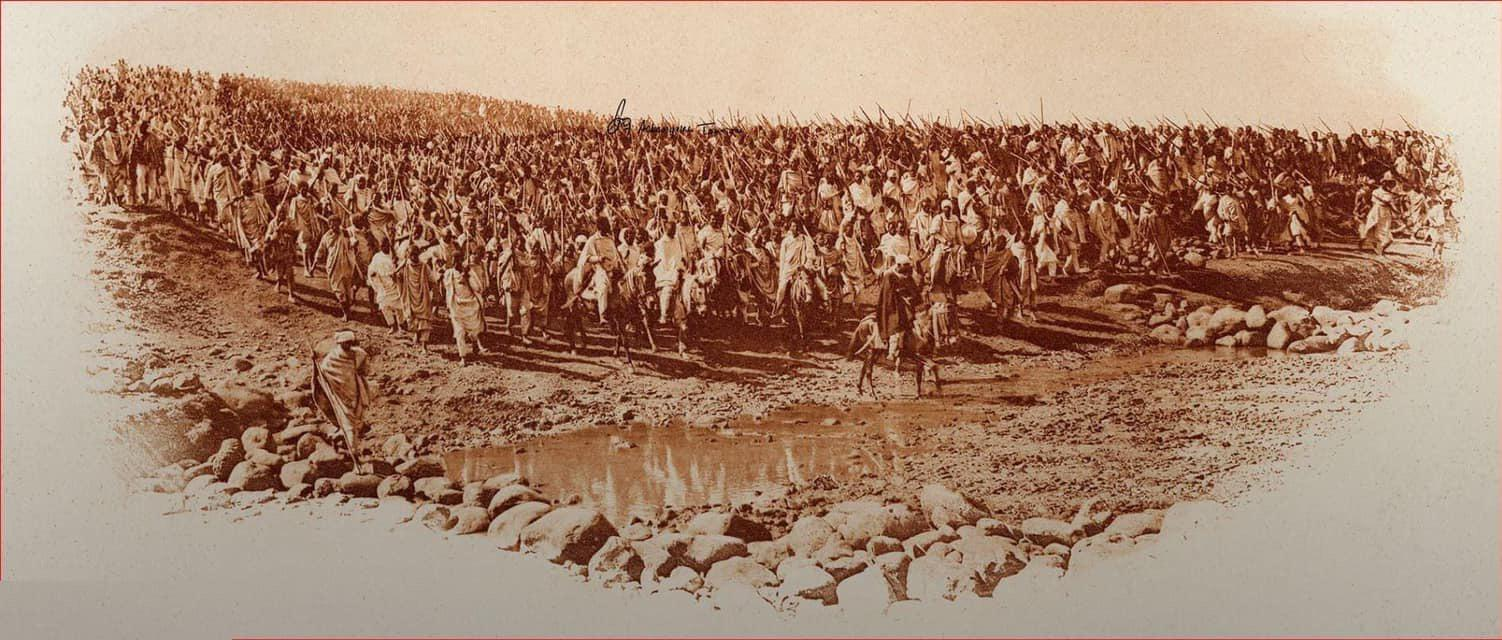
Menelik II leading his army before the Battle of Adwa

The military history of Ethiopia dates back to the foundation of early Ethiopian Kingdoms in 980 BC. Ethiopia has been involved in many of the major conflicts in the horn of Africa, and was one of the few native African nations which remained independent during the Scramble for Africa, managing to create a modern army. 19th and 20th century Ethiopian Military history is characterized by conflicts with the Dervish State, Mahdist Sudan, Egypt, and Italy (which annexed Ethiopia to Italian East Africa, for 5 years until its liberation during WWII), and later by a civil war.

== First Italo–Ethiopian War (1894–1896) ==
From 1895 to 1896, the First Italo–Ethiopian War was fought between the Kingdom of Italy and the Ethiopian Empire (Abyssinia). Unlike most of Africa, Ethiopia was able to avoid being conquered by the European powers. In 1895, Italian armed forces invaded Ethiopia from Eritrea. But, because Ethiopia had established a single and incorporated army and broke ethnic barriers to unite, the Italian regular forces were decisively defeated within a year at the Battle of Adwa.(for example Leonid Artamonov).

== Boundary confrontations with the British Empire (1896–1899) ==
After incorporating Sudan, Kenya and Uganda into the British Empire, Britain now held colonies which bordered Ethiopia from both the north and south, sparking off a series of border confrontations with the Ethiopian government which subsided during the Second Boer War. The Ethiopian military was deployed to the borders to prevent possible incursions from British colonial forces in the process of attempting to establish a clearly delineated border with the British Empire. A key factor in the preservation of Ethiopian independence was the state of its military, which was organized along European lines and was being trained by foreign advisors. Being able to resist foreign incursions along with establish relationships with European nations from which it could draw on for diplomatic support and arms sales gave pause to the surrounding colonial expansion by European powers.

Russian military advisor Alexander Bulatovich gave the following summary of the state of the Ethiopian military:

Many consider the Abyssinian army to be undisciplined. They think that it is not in condition to withstand a serious fight with a well-organized European army, claiming that the recent war with Italy doesn't prove anything.

I will not begin to guess the future, and will say only this. Over the course of four months, I watched this army closely. It is unique in the world. And I can bear witness to the fact that it is not quite so chaotic as it seems at first glance, and that on the contrary, it is profoundly disciplined, though in its own unique way. For every Abyssinian, war is the most usual business, and military skills and rules of army life in the field enter in the flesh and blood of each of them, just as do the main principles of tactics. On the march, each soldier knows how to arrange necessary comforts for himself and to spare his strength; but on the other hand, when necessary, he shows such endurance and is capable of action in conditions which are difficult even to imagine. You see remarkable expediency in all the actions and skills of this army; and each soldier has an amazingly intelligent attitude toward managing the mission of the battle.

Despite such qualities, because of its impetuousness, it is much more difficult to control this army than a well-drilled European army, and I can only marvel at and admire the skill of its leaders and chiefs, of whom there is no shortage."

Russia allowed a number of Ethiopians to attend several Russian military cadet schools. From 1901 to 1913, approximately 40 Ethiopian officers attended military training in Russia. Tekle Hawariat Tekle Mariyam, the future author of Ethiopia's constitution, was among those that attended.

In accordance with the order of emperor of Ethiopia, Nikolay Leontiev organized the first battalion of the regular Ethiopian army. It was presented to Menelik II, in February, 1899. This battalion formed the cadre around which the army was organized. The company of volunteers was then organised from the former Senegal shooters (disappointed or unreliable for colonial authorities), which he chose and invited from Western Africa. They were trained by Russian and French officers. The first Ethiopian military orchestra was organized at the same time.

== Second Italo-Ethiopian War ==
On October 3, 1935, Fascist Italy invaded the Ethiopian Empire from Italian Eritrea and Italian Somaliland. The Ethiopians used prohibited dumdum bullets and mutilated captured soldiers, while the Italians used chemical weaponry in a number of battles.

The Second Italo-Abyssinian War, the Spanish Civil War, and the Mukden Incident are often seen as precursors to World War II, and a demonstration of the ineffectiveness of the League of Nations. In 1941, after years of occupation, Emperor Haile Selassie I returned to what was now called Italian East Africa. With the help of the British, the Emperor led an uprising to drive the Italian Army from his country after a guerrilla war. Ethiopia's patriotic resistance from its many leaders made it resist being colonized by the Italians.

== World War II ==
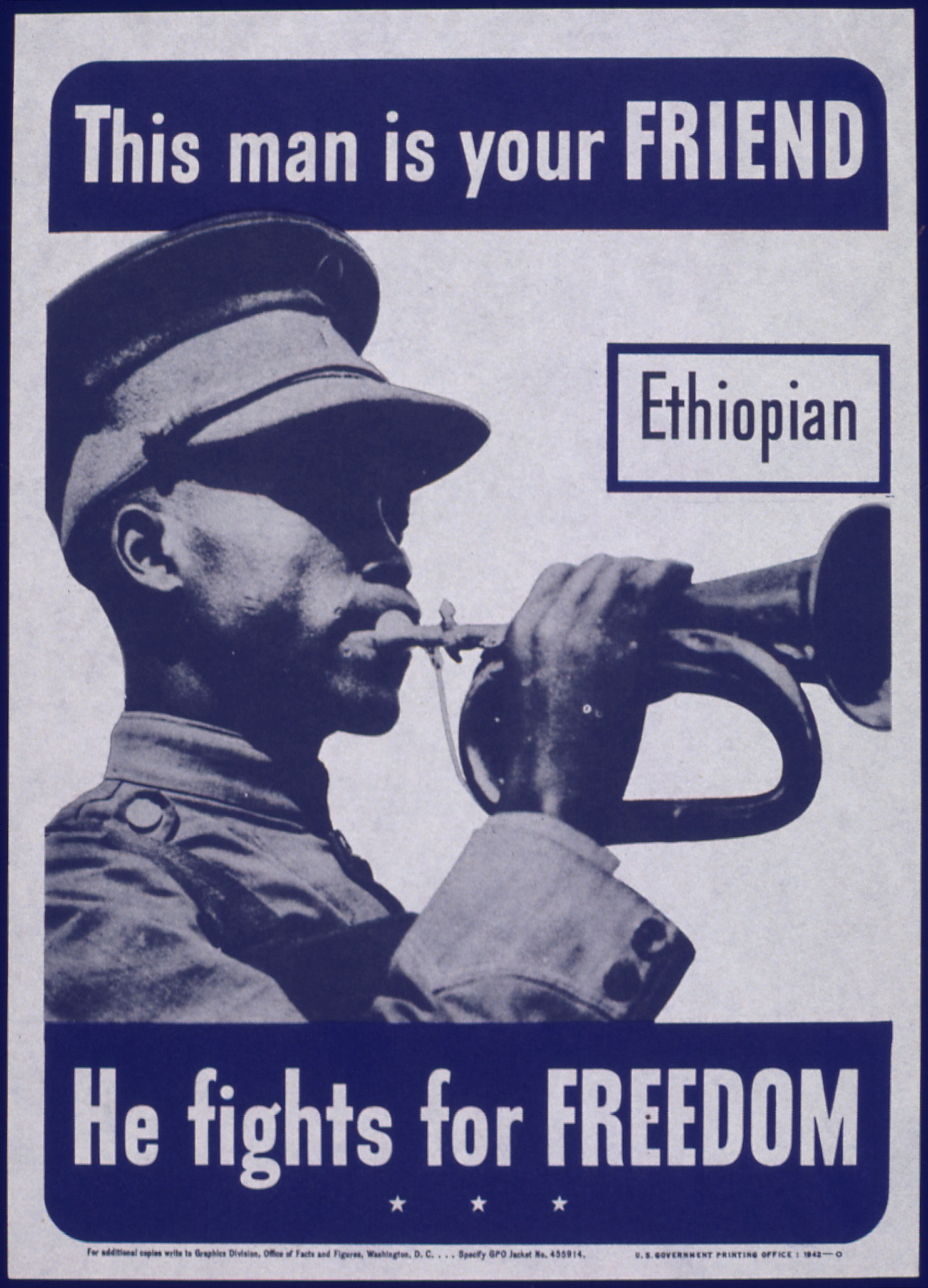
An American propaganda poster during the Second World War depicting an Ethiopian army bugler.

During the East African Campaign, with the help of British forces, Emperor Haile Selassie joined the resistance groups against the Italian Army. After some initial Italian offensive actions in 1940 (conquest of Kassala in Sudan and British Somaliland), British and Commonwealth forces launched attacks from the Sudan and from Kenya. On 5 May 1941, the Emperor re-entered Addis Ababa. By the end of November, organized Italian resistance in East Africa ended with the fall of Gondar. The siege of Gondar lasted six months, with the Italian garrison of over 10,000 troops, mostly Italians, commanded by General Guglielmo Nasi, finally surrendering to British and South African forces. Nasi stated he surrendered only “to spare useless waste of life.” However Italians maintained a guerrilla war, mainly in northern Ethiopia, until September 1943.

== Korean War ==
Ethiopia sent 1,271–3,518 troops as part of the United Nation Forces to aid South Korea. The troops were known as the Kagnew Battalion under the command of General Mulugueta Bulli. It was attached to the American 7th Infantry Division, and fought in a number of engagements including the Battle of Pork Chop Hill. 121 were killed and 536 wounded during the Korean War.

== Derg Rule ==
In 1974, a military coup overthrew Emperor Haile Selassie and declared Ethiopia a republic. Between 1974 and 1984, a communist military junta called Derg ruled.

== Ogaden War ==
Somalia invaded the Ogaden region and starting the Ogaden War. Fighting erupted as Somalia attempted a temporary shift in the regional balance of power in their favour by occupying the Ogaden region. The Soviet Union switched from supplying Somalia to supporting Ethiopia, which had previously been backed by the United States. The war ended when Somali forces retreated back across the border and a truce was declared. Ethiopia was able to defeat the Somali forces with the aid of the USSR, Cuba, and South Yemen. This was the first conflict in which the Mi-24 was used.

== Civil War ==
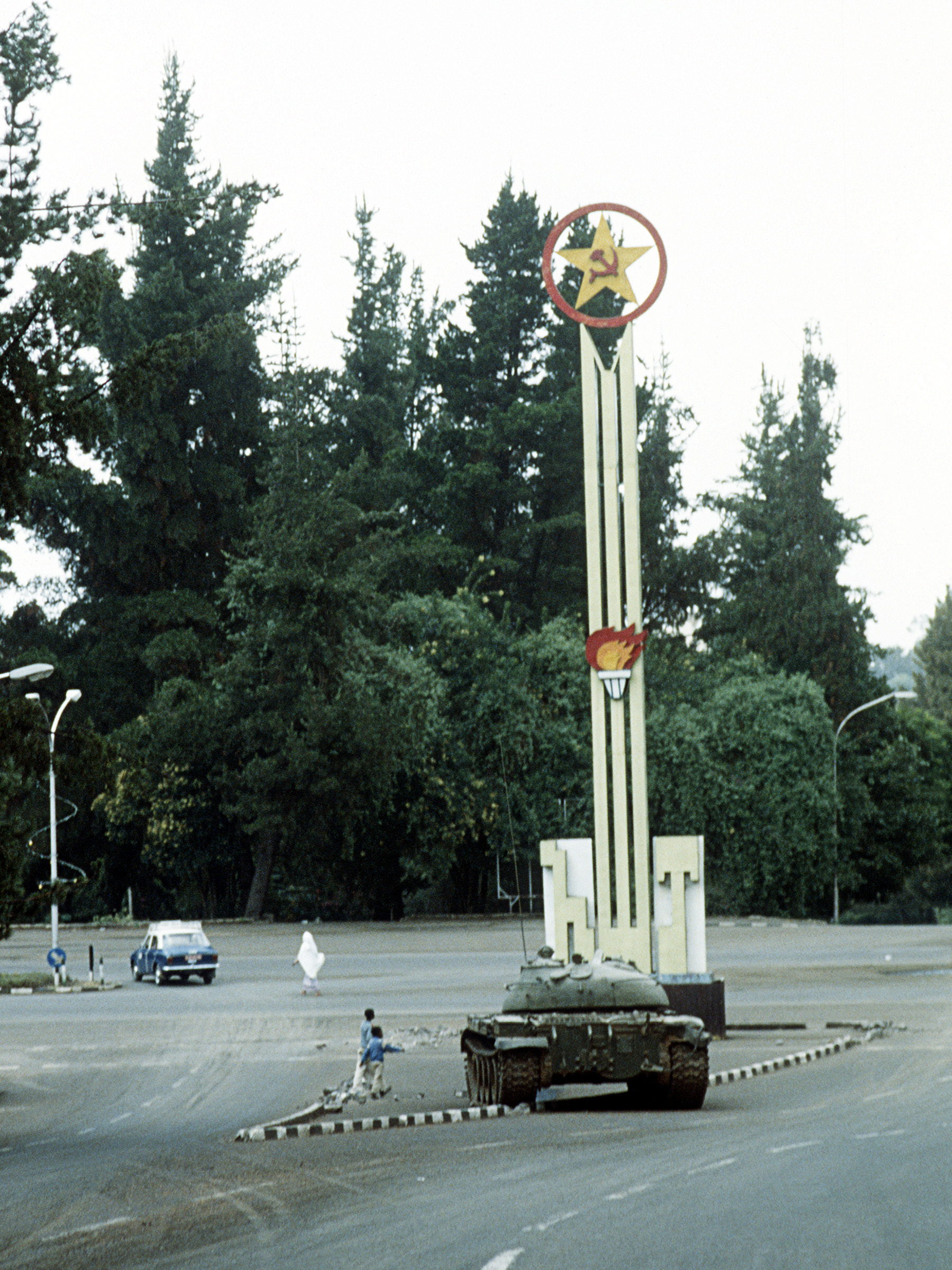
A T-55 main battle tank guards an intersection following seizure of government control by rebel factions.

The Ethiopian Civil War was a 17-year conflict between the Derg government backed by the USSR against anti-communist rebels backed by the United States. The conflict ended in 1991 with the Derg government defeated and out of power along with Eritrea gaining independence. The Eritrean insurgence that began in 1961 was helped by a nationwide Ethiopian guerrilla campaign of OLF, TPLF and ONLF against the Ethiopian Derg government. At the end of the Civil war, with the Eritrean and Ethiopian victory over the Derg government, Eritrea gained its independence from Ethiopia in 1991 following a referendum.

== Eritrean-Ethiopian War ==
The Eritrean-Ethiopian War was a border clash that took place from May 1998 to June 2000.

Fighting escalated to artillery and tank fire leading to four weeks of intense fighting. Ground troops fought on three fronts. Eritrea claims Ethiopia launched air strikes against Eritrea's capital Asmara while Ethiopia accused Eritrea of striking first. The fighting led to massive internal displacement in both countries as civilians fled the war zone.

The conflict ended in stalemate and deployment of UNMEE.

== Somalia ==
In 2006, Ethiopia deployed troops to aid the TFG in the ongoing Somali Civil War. ENDF deployed troops in the northern region to aid the TFG and in the southern region with support from the United States Fifth Fleet. By January 2007 Ethiopian forces were about 200,000 troops. In November 2008 Ethiopia announced that they would be removing their troops, and all Ethiopian forces had left the country by January 15, 2009.

== See also ==
- African military systems to 1800
- African military systems (1800–1900)
- African military systems after 1900
- Ethiopian National Defense Force
- Ethiopian Air Force
- Ethiopian Navy
- Military history of Egypt
