= Russian attempts to colonize Africa =

History of Russian contact in Africa

Russia has historically had special relations with the African continent, from suggestions of an alliance with Abyssinia in the 17th and 19th century to the failed attempts of establishing Russian colonies on Madagascar.

== Ethiopia ==
In 1674, under the suggestion of the Wettin dynasty, ruling Saxe-Gotha at the time, an alliance was proposed between Ethiopia (then Abyssinia) and Russia. The reasoning for such an alliance stemmed from Western Europe's animosity towards the Ottoman Empire, to which the house of Wettin had sought to mediate, under the belief of how similar both Ethiopia (then Abyssinia) and Muscovy, sharing Eastern Orthodox branch of Christianity, had expected both to come together cordially, bringing Abyssinia into their common struggle against the Ottomans. However, at the time, Russia had little to no interest in such an endeavour, viewing the Ottomans as a problem for the Western European houses to deal with.

In 1683, a renewed interest in such an alliance between Russia and Abyssinia had rekindled, this time, under the mediation of London by Hiob Ludolf. However, said attempt had also failed, as Russia at the time still had little to no interest in such an undertaking. It wouldn't be until the reign of Peter the Great to which Russia would develop an interest in establishing influence in Africa.

Alexander Bulatovich was a Russian explorer and army officer who arrived at the port of Massawa, under the pretense of the Russian Red Cross Society mission, to not only provide humanitarian aid to the Ethiopian's conflict against Italy to secure their sovereignty but also had hoped to establish cordial diplomatic ties with Russia and open Ethiopia to the burgeoning capitalist Russian market and economy, finally having arrived at Kingdom of Kaffa on January 13th, 1899, to document Menelik II's conquests. Russia's interest in Ethiopia at this time was primarily to strategically deny the British between Suez and the Red Sea to disrupt their free movement in Asia (Great Game), as well as potentially severing the Cape to Cairo Railway connection of the British.

=== Other notable Russian explorers ===
- Leonid Artamonov
- Nikolay Leontiev
- Nikolai Gumilev

== Madagascar ==
Russia, under Peter the Great, had historically sought to established presence on the island of Madagascar as a stepping stone towards India. In 1723, two ships were sent by Peter the Great from Reval to the island, in hopes of establishing trade relations with the supposed "king of the island of Madagascar" and intending to set up a colony on the island, yet no said king was ever present on the island to which relations could be established.

At the same time, in 1721, Sweden had also sought to establish presence on the island to serve the purpose of conducting trade with the interior of Africa, however they couldn't financially afford such undertaking and was promptly abandoned after.

== See also ==
- Nosy Be
- Russian colonization of North America
- Schäffer affair
