= List of New Testament minuscules (1501–1600) =

A New Testament minuscule is a copy of a portion of the New Testament written in a small, cursive Greek script (developed from Uncial).

== Legend ==
- The numbers (#) are the now standard system of Caspar René Gregory, often referred to as the Gregory-Aland numbers.
- Included among the cataloged minuscules are the following types of manuscripts, color coded:

Grey represents continuous text manuscripts containing only New Testament portions
Beige represents manuscripts with New Testament portions and a catena (quotations from church fathers)
Light cyan represents manuscripts of single-author commentaries who included the full Scripture text.
Light red represents manuscripts of single-author commentaries who included both the full Scripture text and a catena.
Light purple represents manuscripts of commentaries where the Scripture text was abridged.
White represents manuscript numbers no longer in use.

- Dates are estimated to the nearest 100 year increment where specific date is unknown.
- Content generally only describes sections of the New Testament: Gospels, The Acts of the Apostles (Acts), Pauline epistles, and so on. Sometimes the surviving portion of a codex is so limited that specific books, chapters or even verses can be indicated. Linked articles, where they exist, generally specify content in detail, by verse.
- Digital images are referenced with direct links to the hosting web pages, with the exception of those at the INTF. The quality and accessibility of the images is as follows:

Gold color indicates high resolution color images available online.
Tan color indicates high resolution color images available locally, not online.
Light tan color indicates only a small fraction of manuscript pages with color images available online.
Light gray color indicates black/white or microfilm images available online.
Light blue color indicates manuscript not imaged, and is currently lost or ownership unknown.
Light pink color indicates manuscript destroyed, presumed destroyed, or deemed too fragile to digitize.
Violet color indicates high resolution ultraviolet images available online.

† Indicates the manuscript has damaged or missing pages.
^{P} Indicates only a portion of the books were included.
^{K} Indicates manuscript also includes a commentary.
^{S} Indicates lost portions of manuscript replaced via supplement of a later hand.
^{abs} (abschrift) Indicates manuscript is copy.
[ ] Brackets around Gregory-Aland number indicate the manuscript belongs to an already numbered manuscript, was found to not be a continuous text manuscript, was found to be written in modern Greek versus Koine Greek, was proved a forgery, or has been destroyed.

== Minuscules 1501-1600 ==
#	Date	Contents	Pages	Institution and refs.	City, State	Country	Images
1501	13th	Gospels, Acts, General Epistles, Pauline Epistles	202	Great Lavra Monastery, Λ' 79	Mount Athos	Greece	INTF
1502	13th	Gospels	408	Great Lavra Monastery, Λ' 87	Mount Athos	Greece	INTF
1503	1317	New Testament	263	Great Lavra Monastery, Λ' 99	Mount Athos	Greece	INTF, CSNTM
1504	14th	Luke†, John†	93	Great Lavra Monastery, Λ' 109	Mount Athos	Greece	INTF
1505	12th	Gospels, Acts, General Epistles, Pauline Epistles	273	Great Lavra Monastery, B' 26	Mount Athos	Greece	INTF, CSNTM
1506	1320	Gospels^{K}, Romans^{K}, 1 Corinthians 1:1-4:15^{K}†	338	Great Lavra Monastery, B' 89	Mount Athos	Greece	INTF
1507	10th	Gospels†	252	Great Lavra Monastery, B' 113	Mount Athos	Greece	INTF, CSNTM
1508	15th	Gospels†, Acts†, General Epistles†, Pauline Epistles†	449	Great Lavra Monastery, Γ' 30	Mount Athos	Greece	INTF
1509	13th	Matthew† 17:25-28:20, Mark - Acts, Pauline Epistles, General Epistles	332	Great Lavra Monastery, B' 53	Mount Athos	Greece	INTF
1510	11th	Gospels†	211	Great Lavra Monastery, Γ' 48	Mount Athos	Greece	INTF, CSNTM
1511	13th	Gospels	138	Great Lavra Monastery, Γ' 49	Mount Athos	Greece	INTF
1512	14th	Gospels†	136	Great Lavra Monastery, Γ' 50	Mount Athos	Greece	INTF
1513	11th	Gospels†	169	Great Lavra Monastery, Γ' 53	Mount Athos	Greece	INTF, CSNTM
1514	11th	Gospels	261	Great Lavra Monastery, Γ' 54	Mount Athos	Greece	INTF, CSNTM
1515	13th	Gospels†	164	Great Lavra Monastery, Γ' 55	Mount Athos	Greece	INTF
1516	14th	Theophylact Commentary on Matthew†, John†	104	Great Lavra Monastery, Γ' 56	Mount Athos	Greece	INTF
1517	11th	Gospels†	265	Great Lavra Monastery, Γ' 58	Mount Athos	Greece	INTF, CSNTM
[1518] = 1896							
1519	11th	Gospels	179	Great Lavra Monastery, Γ' 100	Mount Athos	Greece	INTF, CSNTM
1520	11th	Luke†, John†	80	Great Lavra Monastery, Γ' 101	Mount Athos	Greece	INTF, CSNTM
1521	1084	Gospels, Acts, General Epistles, Pauline Epistles	253	Dumbarton Oaks, Ms. 3, acc. no. 62.35, fol. 88-253, 255-341	Washington, DC	USA	HL
1521	1084	Gospels, Acts, General Epistles, Pauline Epistles	1	Cleveland Museum of Art, Acc. 50.154, 1 fol. (fol. 254, 1 Peter 1:1-21)	Cleveland, OH	USA	CMA
1521	1084	Gospels, Acts, General Epistles, Pauline Epistles	1	The State Tretyakov Gallery, 2580, fol. 187bis (John 1:1-26)	Moscow	Russia	INTF
[1522] = 1890							
1523	13th/14th	Theophylact Commentary on 1 John, 2 John, 3 John, Jude, Romans, 2 Corinthians - Colossians	153	Austrian National Library, Cod. Theol. gr. 141	Vienna	Austria	INTF, CSNTM
1524	14th	Theophylact Commentary on Acts, General Epistles, Pauline epistles	331	Austrian National Library, Cod. Theol. gr. 150	Vienna	Austria	INTF, CSNTM
1525	13th	Acts†, General Epistles†, Pauline epistles†	187	Jagiellonian Library, Graec. Qu. 57, fol. 101-187	Kraków	Poland	
1526	12th	Acts, James	48	National Library, Grec 906	Paris	France	BnF, INTF
1527	14th	Matthew^{K}†, Mark^{K}†, Luke^{K}†	229	Formerly, Skete of Saint Andrew, 29 (destroyed)	Mount Athos	Greece	
1528	1136	Gospels	278	Princeton University Library, Garrett MS. 3	Princeton	USA	CSNTM, PUL
1528	1136	Gospels	278	Princeton University Library, Garrett MS. 3	Princeton	USA	INTF
1529	12th	Gospels	282	Formerly, Skete of Saint Andrew, 709 (destroyed)	Mount Athos	Greece	
1530	12th/13th	Gospels	329	Princeton University Library, Garrett MS. 2	Princeton, NJ	USA	CSNTM PUL
1530	12th/13th	Gospels	329	Princeton University Library, Garrett MS. 2	Princeton, NJ	USA	INTF
1531	11th/12th	Gospels	258	Walters Art Museum, Ms. W. 526	Baltimore, MD	USA	WAM
1532	14th/15th	Gospels	232	Vatopedi Monastery, 1209	Mount Athos	Greece	INTF
1533	1236	Theophylact Commentary on the Gospels	409	Vatopedi Monastery, 244	Mount Athos	Greece	INTF, CSNTM
1534	14th	Theophylact Commentary on the Gospels†	443	Vatopedi Monastery, 246	Mount Athos	Greece	INTF
1535	15th	Gospels	325	Vatopedi Monastery, 247, fol. 1-325	Mount Athos	Greece	INTF
1536	13th	Theophylact Commentary on the Gospels	404	Vatopedi Monastery, 249	Mount Athos	Greece	INTF
1537	15th	Theophylact Commentary on Mark, Luke	267	Vatopedi Monastery, 250	Mount Athos	Greece	INTF
1538	13th/14th	Gospels	284	Vatopedi Monastery, 882	Mount Athos	Greece	INTF
1539	12th	Gospels	339	Vatopedi Monastery, 884	Mount Athos	Greece	INTF, CSNTM
1540	11th/12th	Gospels	298	Vatopedi Monastery, 885	Mount Athos	Greece	INTF, CSNTM
1541	13th	Gospels	398	Vatopedi Monastery, 887	Mount Athos	Greece	INTF
1542	12th/13th	Gospels†	241	Vatopedi Monastery, 897	Mount Athos	Greece	INTF, CSNTM
1543	1355	Gospels	237	Vatopedi Monastery, 898	Mount Athos	Greece	INTF, CSNTM
1544	14th	Gospels	219	Vatopedi Monastery, 899	Mount Athos	Greece	INTF
1545	11th	Gospels	302	Vatopedi Monastery, 900	Mount Athos	Greece	INTF, CSNTM
1546	1263	Gospels	157	Vatopedi Monastery, 896	Mount Athos	Greece	INTF, CSNTM
1547	1339	Gospels†	255	Vatopedi Monastery, 901	Mount Athos	Greece	INTF, CSNTM
1548	1359	Gospels†, Acts†, General Epistles†, Pauline Epistles†	350	Vatopedi Monastery, 902	Mount Athos	Greece	INTF, CSNTM
1549	13th/14th	Gospels	372	Vatopedi Monastery, 905	Mount Athos	Greece	INTF
1550	13th/14th	Gospels	245	Vatopedi Monastery, 910	Mount Athos	Greece	INTF
1551	13th	Gospels, Revelation	264	Vatopedi Monastery, 913	Mount Athos	Greece	INTF
1552	13th/14th	Gospels†	299	Vatopedi Monastery, 914	Mount Athos	Greece	INTF
1553	14th	Gospels	340	Vatopedi Monastery, 915	Mount Athos	Greece	INTF
1554	14th	Gospels†	305	Vatopedi Monastery, 917	Mount Athos	Greece	INTF, CSNTM
1555	13th	Gospels	298	Vatopedi Monastery, 918	Mount Athos	Greece	INTF
1556	1068	Gospels	251	Vatopedi Monastery, 919	Mount Athos	Greece	INTF, CSNTM
1557	1293	Gospels	264	Vatopedi Monastery, 920	Mount Athos	Greece	INTF, CSNTM
1558	13th/14th	Gospels	225	Vatopedi Monastery, 921	Mount Athos	Greece	INTF, CSNTM
1559	14th	Gospels	257	Vatopedi Monastery, 922	Mount Athos	Greece	INTF
1560	14th	Gospels†	292	Vatopedi Monastery, 923	Mount Athos	Greece	INTF
1561	12th/13th	Gospels†	226	Vatopedi Monastery, 926	Mount Athos	Greece	INTF, CSNTM
1562	12th	Gospels†	322	Vatopedi Monastery, 928	Mount Athos	Greece	INTF
1563	13th	Gospels†, Acts, General Epistles, Romans - Colossians 1:18†	307	Vatopedi Monastery, 929	Mount Athos	Greece	INTF, CSNTM
1564	1300	Gospels†	291	Vatopedi Monastery, 930	Mount Athos	Greece	INTF, CSNTM
1565	13th	Gospels†	272	Vatopedi Monastery,931	Mount Athos	Greece	INTF
1566	11th/12th	Gospels†	128	Vatopedi Monastery, 932	Mount Athos	Greece	INTF, CSNTM
1567	13th	Gospels†	184	Vatopedi Monastery, 933	Mount Athos	Greece	INTF
1568	14th	Gospels†	137	Vatopedi Monastery, 934	Mount Athos	Greece	INTF
1569	1307	Gospels†	157	Vatopedi Monastery,935	Mount Athos	Greece	INTF, CSNTM
1570	11th	Gospels	352	Vatopedi Monastery, 936	Mount Athos	Greece	INTF, CSNTM
1571	13th/14th	Gospels†	258	Vatopedi Monastery, 927	Mount Athos	Greece	INTF
1572	1304	Gospels	230	Vatopedi Monastery, 938	Mount Athos	Greece	INTF, CSNTM
1573	12th/13th	Gospels†, Acts†, General Epistles†, Pauline Epistles†	359	Vatopedi Monastery, 939	Mount Athos	Greece	INTF, CSNTM
1574	14th	Gospels†	229	Vatopedi Monastery, 940	Mount Athos	Greece	INTF
1575	13th	Gospels	408	Vatopedi Monastery, 941	Mount Athos	Greece	INTF
1576	13th	Gospels	274	Vatopedi Monastery, 943	Mount Athos	Greece	INTF
1577	1303	Gospels	282	Vatopedi Monastery, 944	Mount Athos	Greece	INTF, CSNTM
1578	13th	Gospels	189	Vatopedi Monastery, 945	Mount Athos	Greece	INTF
1579	11th	Gospels	265	Vatopedi Monastery, 946	Mount Athos	Greece	INTF, CSNTM
1580	13th/14th	Gospels†	129	Vatopedi Monastery, 947	Mount Athos	Greece	INTF
1581	14th	Gospels	329	Vatopedi Monastery, 948	Mount Athos	Greece	INTF
1582	948	Gospels	287	Vatopedi Monastery, 949	Mount Athos	Greece	INTF, CSNTM
1583	12th	Gospels	201	Vatopedi Monastery, 950	Mount Athos	Greece	INTF, CSNTM
1584	14th	Gospels	256	Vatopedi Monastery, 951	Mount Athos	Greece	INTF
1585	13th	Gospels	295	Vatopedi Monastery, 953	Mount Athos	Greece	INTF
1586	13th	Gospels	332	Vatopedi Monastery, 954	Mount Athos	Greece	INTF
1587	13th	Gospels†	230	Vatopedi Monastery, 955	Mount Athos	Greece	INTF
1588	13th	Gospels	241	Vatopedi Monastery, 956	Mount Athos	Greece	INTF
1589	12th	Gospels	329	Vatopedi Monastery, 957	Mount Athos	Greece	INTF
1590	12th	Gospels	138	Vatopedi Monastery, 958	Mount Athos	Greece	INTF
1591	1579	Gospels†	298	Vatopedi Monastery, 952	Mount Athos	Greece	MAR
1592	1445	Gospels	424	Vatopedi Monastery, 959	Mount Athos	Greece	INTF, CSNTM
1593	13th	Matthew† 14:6-28:20, Mark - John	113	Vatopedi Monastery, 961	Mount Athos	Greece	INTF
1594	1284	Gospels†, Acts†, General Epistles†, Pauline Epistles†	362	Vatopedi Monastery, 962	Mount Athos	Greece	INTF, CSNTM
1595	13th	Gospels, Acts, General Epistles, Pauline Epistles	295	Vatopedi Monastery,964	Mount Athos	Greece	INTF
1596	13th	Gospels	263	Vatopedi Monastery, 965	Mount Athos	Greece	INTF
1597	1289	New Testament	515	Vatopedi Monastery, 966	Mount Athos	Greece	INTF, CSNTM
1598	14th	Gospels†, Acts†, General Epistles†, Pauline Epistles†	344	Vatopedi Monastery, 967	Mount Athos	Greece	INTF
1599	14th	Gospels†, Acts†, General Epistles†, Pauline Epistles†	352	Vatopedi Monastery, 963	Mount Athos	Greece	INTF
1600	14th	Gospels	274	Vatopedi Monastery, 970	Mount Athos	Greece	INTF

[top]

== See also ==
- List of New Testament papyri
- List of New Testament uncials
- List of New Testament minuscules (1–1000)
- List of New Testament minuscules (1001–2000)
- List of New Testament minuscules (2001–)
- List of New Testament minuscules ordered by Location/Institution
- List of New Testament lectionaries

== Bibliography ==
- Aland, Kurt; M. Welte; B. Köster; K. Junack (1994). Kurzgefasste Liste der griechischen Handschriften des Neues Testaments. Berlin, New York: Walter de Gruyter. p. 95. ISBN 3-11-011986-2.
- "Liste Handschriften". Münster: Institute for New Testament Textual Research.
