= Nikolay Ivanovich Ashinov =

Russian explorer and adventurer

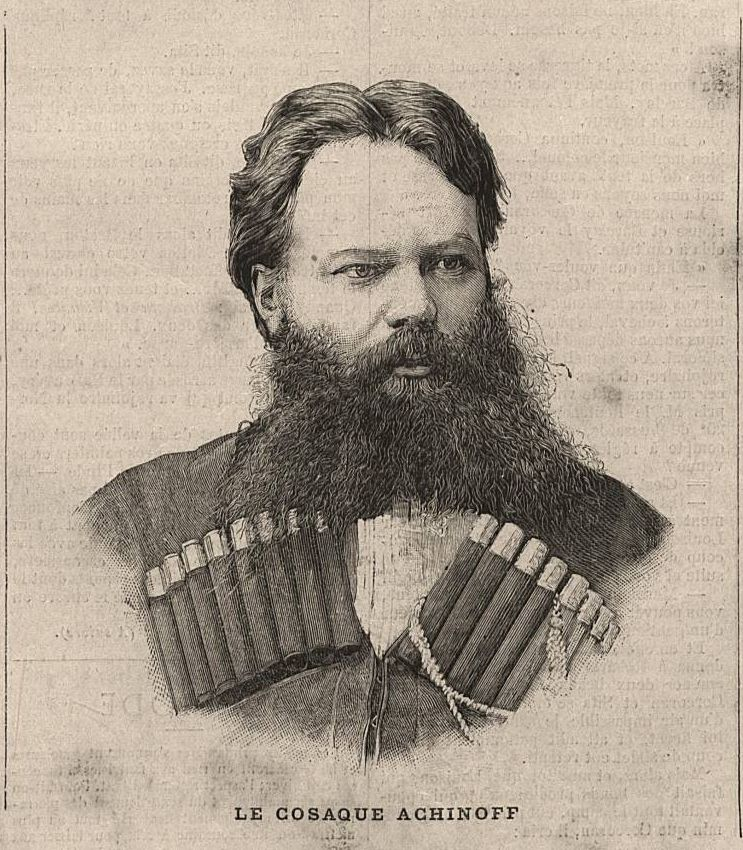
- Born: 1859; Tsaritsyn, Russian Empire
- Died: 1902 (aged 42–43); Kamyshinsky Uyezd, Russian Empire
- Occupation: Explorer
- Known for: Russian exploration in Ethiopia and in the Gulf of Tadjoura

Nikolay Ivanovich Ashinov (also Achinov or Atchinoff, Russian: Никола́й Ива́нович Ашинов) (1856-1902) was a Cossack, burgess of Penza and adventurer-traveler. He was also a Russian amateur linguist who published “The Abyssinian alphabet and the initial Abyssinian-Russian dictionary” (Russian: Абиссинскую азбуку и начальный абиссино-русский словарь) as well as the commanding officer of the Sagallo expedition in Abyssinia. His deeds contributed to a political and ecclesiastic rapprochement of this Christian country with the Russian Empire. Furthermore, Achinov participated in Nikolay Leontiev's colonial expeditions in the Horn of Africa.

== Biography ==
=== Russian period ===
Nikolay Ivanovich Ashinov was born in 1856 in a hereditary merchant family of Tsaritsyn (present day Volgograd) in the Saratov Governorate. He studied at the Saratov Real school N.1. He was of a restless disposition and his studies did not work out as expected. When his father went bankrupt, Nikolai sold the remaining property and left his hometown (1880). He rushed to the Caucasus, driven by the project to grow tobacco. However, Ashinov did not possess the knowledge and patience of such an endeavour and abandoned the region 3 years later.

In 1883, Ashinov arrived in Saint Petersburg. He was convinced that some Cossacks, originally from Russia, had moved to the mountains of Anatolia - then part of the Ottoman Empire - and to Persian shores of the Caspian Sea where they had been living for the last three hundred years. He shared this alleged knowledge that these tribes had retained not only their way of life and the Russian customs, but also their loyalty to the Orthodox Church and a desire to serve the Russian Motherland. Ashinov presented himself as the elected Ataman of these “free Cossacks” and stated that he had come to St. Petersburg in order to ask the Russian government to allow them to return to Russia and to settle on the Black Sea coast. There, Nicolay offered to set up and lead a new "Black Sea Cossack army".

Ashinov's speech seduced several influence figures:

- Valerian Panaev (1824–1899), an engineer and publicist;
- General Otto Karl Peter von Richter (1830–1908), commander of the Imperial Main Headquarters;
- Ivan Aksakov (1823–1886), an intellectual and Slavophile;
- Mikhail Katkov (1818–1887), an influential journalist.

In the spring of 1884, Nikolay began to collect volunteers from the Poltava Governorate to be resettled to the Sukhumi district. There, Ashinov had obtained a territory where he intended to set up the village of "Nikolaevskaya". However, more than half of the settlers immediately left the colony and returned. In this activity, though, Ashinov had kept personally the money allocated by the local administration for the project.

In December 1884, after an investigation, a criminal case for embezzling was opened against him: Ashinov having fled to Moscow, he presented himself as the victim. He got the support from Mikhail Katkov and by Aleksey Suvorin, an influential journalist from St. Petersburg.

=== Activities in Africa ===
In 1885, Ashinov reached the northern port of Massawa, then in Italian Eritrea, located on the coast of the Red Sea. He presented himself as an Ataman whose goal was to travel to the province of Tigray, part of the Ethiopian Empire. Once in the area, Nikolay set out a plan to promote a rapprochement of the Christian country with the Russian Empire. Part of his political engagements led him to approach the Emperor of Ethiopia Yohannes IV (Amharic: ንጉሠ-ነግስት ዮሐንስ አራተኛ), posing as a representative of the Tsarist authorities.

After returning to Russia, his travel story circulated by Russian newspapers and embellished by journalists gave him an unexpected popularity. Ashinov activated his supports to get an audience with Alexander III, but it did not happen. To this purpose, he had brought gifts to the tsar, allegedly from the Abyssinian Negus, among which was a live ostrich. These presents were handed over to the commander of the Imperial Apartment, General Richter; the ostrich was placed in a poultry house in Gatchina park.

Ashinov tried to get government support (i.e. money and weapons) to occupy a territory in Abyssinia. He first unsuccessfully acted through Ivan Shestakov, the Minister of the Russian Navy. His second move was to reach Konstantin Pobedonostsev, then Chief Prosecutor of the Holy Synod, who was championing the founding of an Orthodox mission in Abyssinia. Lastly, Nikolay secured the patronage of Nikolay Baranov, the governor of Nizhny Novgorod who enjoyed the trust of Alexander III. Eventually, the emperor agreed to a preliminary exploration in the area of the Horn of Africa.

Ashinov launched his mission in the spring of 1888 with a small group of companions. The group left on the "Kostroma", a steamship of the Dobroflot, towards Africa. They landed on 6 April 1888 on the shores of the Gulf of Tadjoura. There, Nikolay managed to establish friendly relations with the local tribal leader. Without warning, he left in June to Kyiv, where the 900th anniversary of the baptism of Russia was celebrated, leaving the local project in midair. He was accompanied by two Abyssinian monks, whom he presented to Konstantin Pobedonostsev in St. Petersburg as envoys of the Negus himself.

Pobedonostsev was impressed and started to prepare a spiritual mission to Abyssinia. Furthermore, he mentioned Ashinov's efforts to the Tsar Alexander III in a letter on 9 October 1888; the latter supported the endeavour (I’ll see what can be done about this). As a matter of fact, it was decided to send together with Ashinov a spiritual mission led by Archimandrite Paisius. The planned expedition was also supposed to carry a small batch of weapons for the Abyssinian people and some equipment to establish a sea shore coal-storage station, dedicated to re-supply Russian ships. A calling for volunteers as well as a collection of donations began and Ashinov was handed out a stack of weapons from the arsenals of the Odessa Military District. However, on 7 November 1888, the Tsar was informed by Aleksandr Nelidov, his ambassador in Constantinople, that Ashinov's first mission in Africa had been in reality abandoned by him without any achievement. These news interrupted immediately government support for the man, while weapons and equipment were taken back.

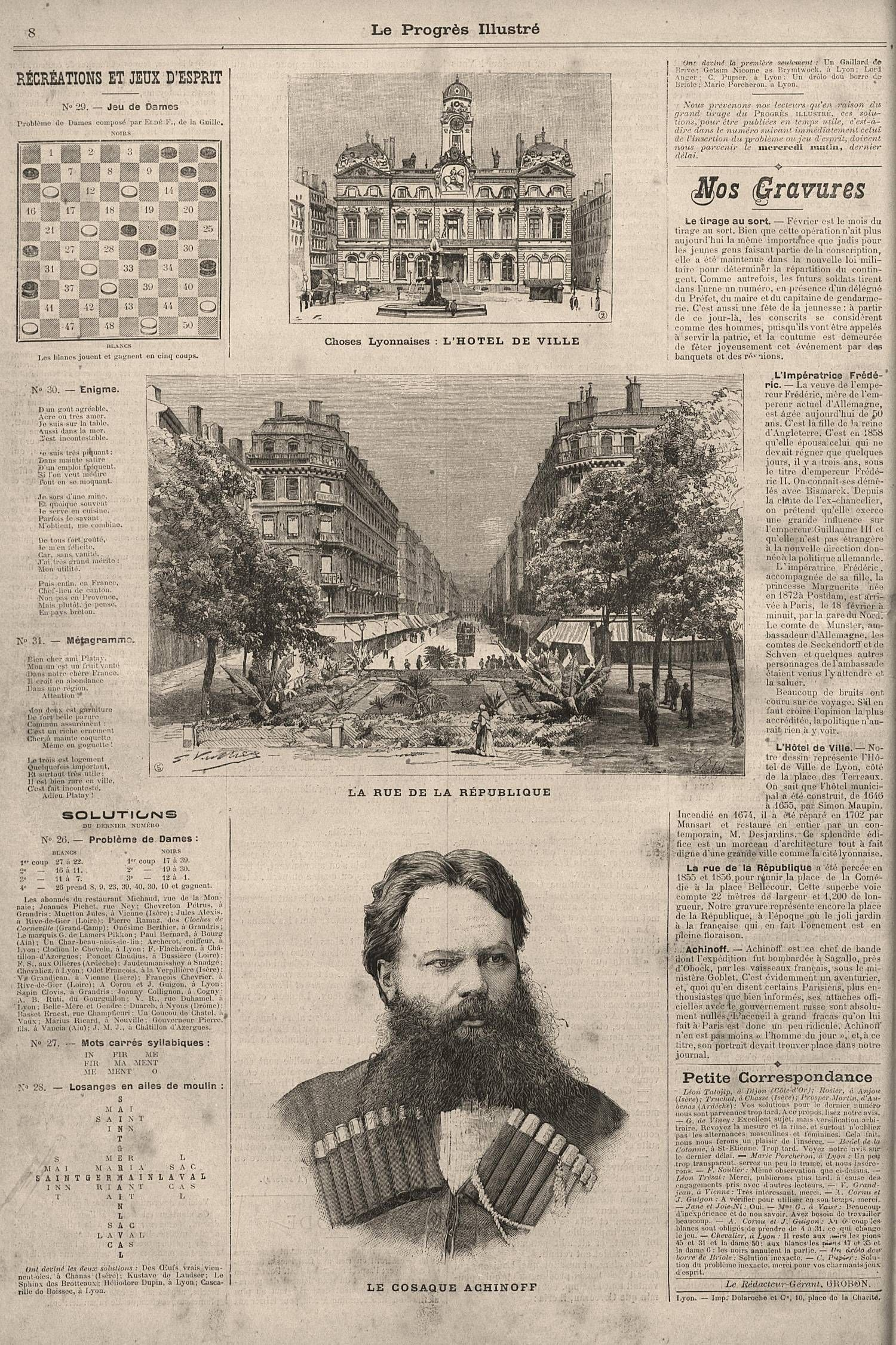
An article from Le Progrès Illustré on Achinov's expedition

==== Sagallo expedition ====
This left Ashinov with no other solution than funding his expedition through private means. On 10 December 1888, the mission set off for Africa: it comprised about 150 people of various origins, including women with children and around 40 people of the spiritual delegation led by Archimandrite Paisius. The expedition was transported from Alexandria to Port Said by the Russian ship Lazarev. In Port Said, Ashinov hired the Austrian ship Amphitride, which entered the Gulf of Tadjoura - then a French protectorate - on 6 January 1889. There, they were welcomed by four Cossacks who have been securing luggage and supplies since the previous visit. Abyssinian priests were also awaiting the spiritual delegation and its leader Paisius.

Once ashore, the pretense of a religious mission to Ethiopia was quickly abandoned as Ashinov revealed his intention to settle permanently in the Gulf of Tadjoura. Ashinov organized a shelter for the mission in the abandoned Egyptian fort of Sagallo, where they settled on 14 January. Concurrently, he announced the place Russian soil and christened it New Moscow (Russian: Новая Москва). Additionally he proclaimed as Russian land the area "fifty miles along the coast and a hundred miles inland": on 28 January the Russian flag was raised. While several people from the expedition fled to Obock, a nearby village from the French territory nearby, French authorities became aware of the presence of the Russian colony, at odds with the initial intention to travel to Abyssinia.

On 5 February 1889, an ultimatum, supported by a French squadron consisting of a cruiser and three gunboats, was sent to Ashinov demanding his withdrawal from the French protectorate. Passing the deadline, Sagallo was shelled by artillery, killing one Cossack and five civilians. Furthermore, the attack entirely destroyed the landings. Ashinov's troops soon surrendered and were put under arrest by the French.

They were sent back to Suez on the clipper Zabiyaka and then to Odessa on the steamship Chikhachev. After a short investigation ordered by the Tsar Alexander III, most of the members of the expedition were sent to an "ad hoc" place of residence:

- Archimandrite Paisius was assigned to a monastery in Georgia;
- Ashinov was exiled under police supervision for three years to a remote district of Saratov province.

==== Later years ====
Pardoned in April 1890, Ashinov traveled to Paris and London. There, in August 1891, he sent a letter to the Tsar, offering his services for the development of a vast territory in Africa. He spent the rest of his life on his wife's estate in the Chernigov province, where he farmed and raised five children.

Nikolay's last years are shrouded with uncertainty. According to one of his peer's memoirs (1911), Ashinov ended his last days "in his homeland, in the Kamyshinsky district of the Saratov province".

== Work and scientific contributions ==
- Ashinov, Nikolay Ivanovich (1888). Абиссинская азбука и начальный абиссино-русский словарь [Abyssinian Alphabet and Primary Abyssinian-Russian Dictionary] (in Russian). St. Petersburg.
- In addition to African paraphernalia from his expeditions, Ashinov's also brought back manuscripts presented to Alexander III, which ended up in the Gatchina Palace: The Psalter followed (Russian: Псалтирь следованная) and The Organon of Praise of the Holy Virgin (Russian: Органон восхваления Св. Девы).

The items were moved in 1924 to the library of the Theological Academy.

== In fiction ==
- Ashinov is one of the characters of Nikolai Leskov (1831–1895) essay Inspired Vagrants (Russian: Вдохновенные бродяги).
- Soviet novelist Valentin Pikul (1928–1990) wrote a book on the adventurer, Вольный казак Ашинов (English: Free Cossack Ashinov), published in 1993.

== See also ==
- Sagallo
- Nikolay Leontiev
- Alexander Bulatovich
- Leonid Artamonov
- Yermak Timofeyevich
- Foreign policy of the Russian Empire
- Russian colonization of North America

== Bibliography ==
- (in Russian) Николаев, Л. (1889). Ашиновская экспедиция: Рассказ участника экспедиции Л. Николаева [Ashinovskaya Expedition: The Story of Expedition Member L. Nikolaev]. Одесса: И. Желиховский.
- (in Russian) Панаев, В. А. (November 1906). Воспоминания. Русская старина [Memories. Russian antiquity.]. Одесса: Ежемесячное историческое издание. pp. 397–442.
- (in Russian) Хренков, А. B. (1987). Эфиопская миссия Николая Ашинова (по неопубликованным документам архивов Москвы и Ленинграда) [Ethiopian mission of Nikolai Ashinov (based on unpublished documents from the archives of Moscow and Leningrad).]. Ленинград: институт Африки АН СССР.
- (in Russian) Хренков, А. B. (1992). Россия и Эфиопия: развитие двусторонних связей (от первых контактов до 1917 г.) [Russia and Ethiopia: development of bilateral relations (from first contacts to 1917).]. Санкт-Петербург: институт Африки АН.
- (in Russian) Хренков, А. B. (1996). Русские в Африке: ашиновская авантюра N.4 [Russians in Africa: Ashinov’s adventure N.4]. Санкт-Петербург: Вестник РГНФ. pp. 37–50.
- (in Russian) Луночкин, А. B. (1999). Атаман вольных казаков, Николай Ашинов и его деятельность [Ataman of the free Cossacks, Nikolai Ashinov and his activities]. Волгоград: Волгоград. гос. университета. pp. 37–50.
- (in Russian) Гусарова, E. B. (2016). Эфиопские рукописи — наследство экспедиции Н. И. Ашинова в Абиссинию. Сборник МАЭ. Коллекции и хранители. Т. 62 [Ethiopian manuscripts are the legacy of N.I. Ashinov’s expedition to Abyssinia. Collection of MAE. Collections and curators. T. 62]. Санкт-Петербург: Наука.
- (in Italian) Spedizione Ascinoff del Mar Rosso [Achinoff Red Sea Expedition.]. Roma: Tipografia di Gabinetto del Ministero degli affari esteri. 1889.
- (in French) Constantin, Jean Robert (1891). L'Archimandrite Paisi et l'Ataman Achinoff: une expedition religieuse en Abyssinie / Preface de Juliette Adam [Archimandrite Paisi and Ataman Achinoff: a religious expedition to Abyssinia / Preface by Juliette Adam.]. Paris: Librairie de la “Nouvelle Revue”.
- (in French) Burdo, Adolphe (21 April 1889). Journal des voyages et des aventures de terre et de mer. N.615 [Journal of travels and adventures of land and sea. N.615]. Sceaux: Charaire et Fils. pp. 242–243.
- Jesman, Czeslaw (1958). The Russians in Ethiopia. London: Chatto and Windus.
