= Schäffer affair =

Attempt to claim the Hawaiian Kingdom for the Russian Empire (1815–17)

The Schäffer affair was a diplomatic episode instigated in 1815 by Georg Anton Schäffer who attempted to seize the Kingdom of Hawaii for the Russian Empire. After two years, his scheme failed and he returned to Germany.

While on a trading expedition to the Kingdom, the Russian-American Company (RAC) vessel Bering ran aground during a storm at Waimea on Kauai in January 1815. Kauai chieftain Kaumualii seized the company goods on board. Schäffer was sent later that year from Russian America to recover the lost property, where he spent the following two years courting native leaders to overthrow Kamehameha I.

Kaumualii, who sought outside help in his rivalry with King Kamehameha, invited Schäffer to his island and convinced him that the RAC could easily colonize Hawaii. Schäffer then planned a naval assault on the islands. His actions were not sanctioned by RAC governor Alexander Andreyevich Baranov, who gave no instructions beyond either regaining the company's goods or compensation for them in sandalwood, although Baranov gave orders to conquer Kauai for Russia in the event of conflict.

Mounting resistance of Native Hawaiians and American traders forced Schäffer to admit defeat and leave Hawaii in July 1817, before his triumphant reports from Kauai reached the Russian court. The Company recognized a loss of no less than 200,000 rubles but continued entertaining "the Hawaiian project" until 1821. The Company then sued Schäffer for damages, but after an inconclusive legal standoff found it easier to let him go back to Germany.

== Background ==
During the first Russian circumnavigation, the Russian Empire and the Russian-American Company (RAC) established contact with Hawaiian king Kamehameha I in 1804. Russian vessels continued to visit the Kingdom irregularly, with the primary transactions were focused on foodstuffs. On January 29, 1815, a RAC ship, Bering, dropped anchor near Waimea on Kauai. Captain James Bennett was ordered by RAC Governor Alexander Andreyevich Baranov to use its estimated 100,000 roubles worth of furs and other cargo to purchase needed food and material supplies for settlers in Russian America. On the next night the vessel ran aground in a storm. Bennett made an agreement with King Kaumualii, giving him the wrecked ship though its cargo remained Russian property. Several hundred Kauaians were involved in salvaging the furs and purchased supplies. Despite this, Bennett would later report that the ship and its cargo were both seized by Kaumualii. Two months later the stranded crew was evacuated from Kauai by Albatross.

== Dispatch of the expedition ==
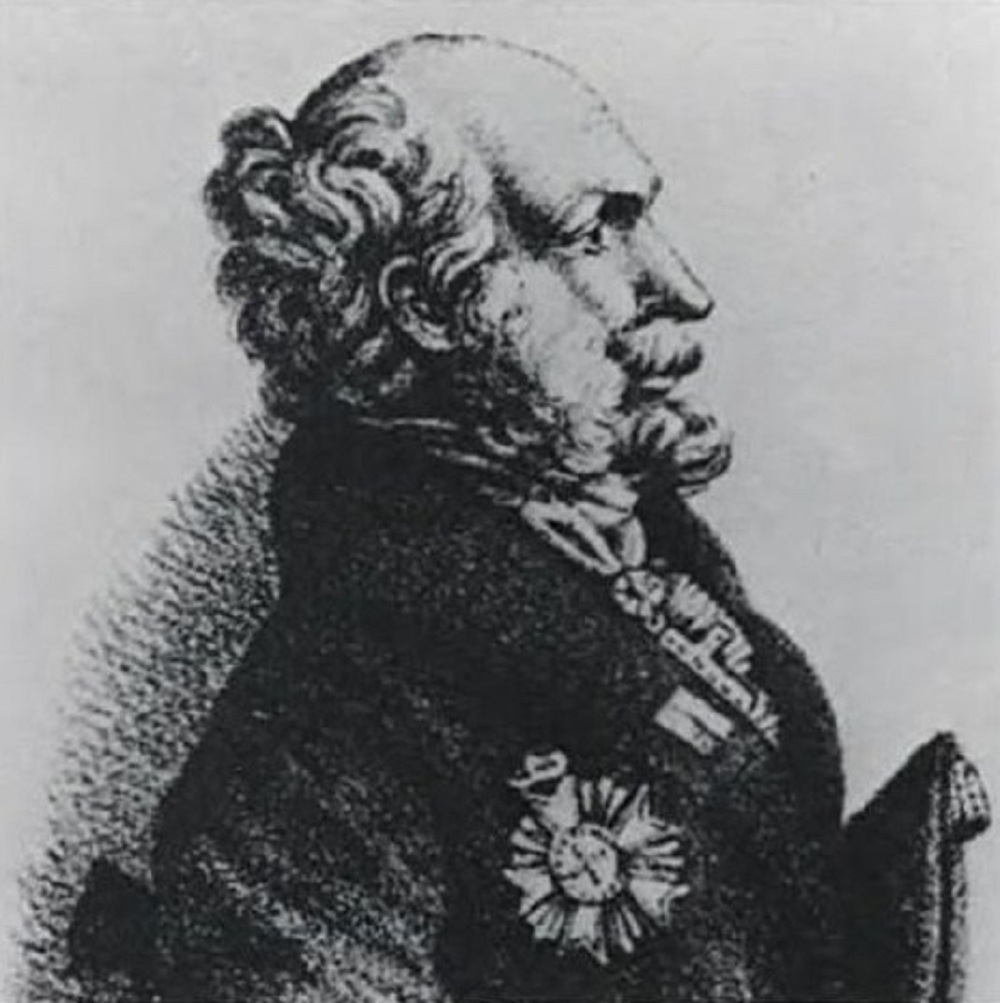
Georg Anton Schäffer

A mission from New Archangel was organized and sent to the Hawaiian Kingdom in October. The former physician of the RAC ship Suvorov, Georg Anton Schäffer, was appointed to command likely due to Baranov simply having no one else eligible at the time. His most able officers at the time were working at RAC posts on Kodiak Island and Fort Ross in Alta California. He instructed Schäffer to present himself as a harmless explorer and obtain Kamehameha's favor, keeping his actual commission secret until then. After courting the monarch, Schäffer was to demand the restitution of the goods taken from the Bering or comparable compensation in sandalwood. If this business proceeded smoothly, Schäffer was to seek Kamehameha's patent for a monopoly in sandalwood trading. In a letter addressed to Kamehameha, Baranov warned of military intervention against Kaumalii if compensation for lost company goods didn't occur. "If Kaumualii does not satisfy our just demands... with your permission, I shall treat him as an enemy."

Schäffer reached the Kingdom on board the Isabella in the beginning of November. What happened between Kamehameha and Schäffer is known only through Schaffer's own unreliable narrative. Americans that had prominent influence with Kamehameha, especially John Young, believed Schäffer's "naturalist" persona was merely a cover. According to Schäffer these men made Kamehameha display outright anti-Russian sentiment. Through medical services to the king and queen Ka'ahumanu, Schäffer was able to regain Kamehameha's good disposition by December. Queen Ka'ahumanu and her brother soon sold him parcels of land and permission to set up trading stations. Schäffer soon began an exploration of the Hawaiian islands, during which time he claimed his travels were interrupted by attempts made against his life by Americans. Afterwards he began to reside on Oahu, where he planted maize, tobacco and watermelons among other plants.

In February 1816, Baranov sent the Otkrytie with lieutenant Podushkin in command as military reinforcements. The orders given to Podushkin stressed the importance of a peaceable solution but failing that it called for an invasion of Kauai: "In such an event, the whole island of Kauai should be taken in the name of our Sovereign Emperor of the Russias and become part of his possessions." The Otkrytie reached the island of Hawaii on April 13 [O.S. April 1] and later entered Honolulu Harbor on April 23 [O.S. April 11]. Another Russian ship, Il’mena, unexpectedly showed up for repairs at the same time. Schäffer remained in command of all Russian forces in the area, including the two ships. A final meeting with Kamehameha was arranged, but he again resisted making any settlements. Immediately setting sail on-board the Otkrytie for Kauai on May 14 [O.S. May 2], Schäffer and Podushkin reached the island three days later.

== Attempted conquest ==
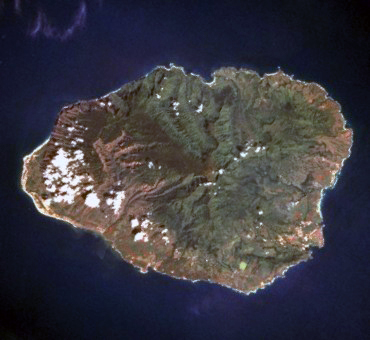
The island of Kauai, domain of chief Kaumualii and Schäffer's original target

Diplomatic talks with Kaumualii quickly commenced and appeared favorable to Schäffer. The Kauain ruler "must have noticed that no representatives of Kamehameha accompanied the Russians." This emboldened him to pledge as "the King of the Sandwich Islands in the North Pacific Ocean, Kauai and Niihau, and hereditary prince of the islands Oahu, Maui, Lanai" allegiance to the emperor of Russia five days after Schäffer arrived. The Hawaiian chieftain further agreed to reimburse the RAC for the losses of 1815 and grant it a monopoly in sandalwood trade. Dressed in an Imperial Russian Naval staff officer uniform, Kaumualii hoisted the Russian-American Company flag over Kauai. Another treaty, signed on July 1 [O.S. June 19], provided the Russians with 500 local soldiers for the conquest of Oahu, Lanai, Maui and Molokai: "The King (Kaumualii) provides Doctor Schäffer carte blanche for this expedition and all assistance in constructing the fortresses on all islands..." and additionally promised to "refuse to trade with citizens of the United States."

Schäffer was given command of over three hundred Hawaiians to begin construction of the forts and trade stations specified in the treaty. Built in the traditional European star-shaped fortress out of stone and adobe, Fort Elizabeth was practically complete and armed with cannons by the end of 1817. Schäffer also laid down two small earthen forts, Alexander and Barclay-de-Tolly, without Hawaiian assistance. Enthusiastically, Schäffer sent messages to Baranov and to imperial authorities in Saint Petersburg, requesting a naval expedition to protect what a contemporary called "his almost lunatic schemes." He soon purchased two ships from Americans for use by Kaumualii. The Avon cost 200,000 Spanish dollars and its captain sailed to New Archangel to receive compensation from Baranov for his vessel. Schäffer spent the summer of 1816 exploring Kauai and giving new names to local landforms, naming the Hanalei River valley in particular Schäfferthal and the Hanapepe river after the Don River.

Kaumualii had no intention to forfeit his possessions; he manipulated Schäffer into "losing all touch with reality", and used the Russians for his own benefit in his standoff with Kamehameha, planning to conquer more islands. Early historians, starting with Otto von Kotzebue, suggested that Kaumualii's revolt was prompted or even led by Schäffer but, according to Mills, the chief "sought to align himself with any foreign power that could help him". During the War of 1812 he sided with the Americans, but by 1815 this alliance fell apart and Schäffer's arrival conveniently filled the empty slot in Kaumualii's plans.

== Defeat and surrender ==
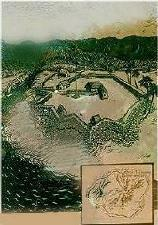
Fort Elizabeth, 1817

Breakup of Schäffer's "empire" began in September 1816 when he had to evacuate the colony in Oahu, yielding to the threat of violence. In December Schäffer received an unexpected "reinforcement": the Russian military brig Rurick captained by Otto von Kotzebue dropped anchor at Hawaii in the middle of a circumnavigation. Kamehameha, unaware of Kotzebue's true disposition, manned the coast with 400 soldiers and militia volunteers, ready to repel the expected landing. Kotzebue managed to persuade the king of his peaceful intentions, and made it clear that the Imperial government has nothing to do with Schäffer's delusions; he left without ever visiting his compatriots on Kauai.

The standoff between Kaumualii and Kamehameha continued, with the Americans allegedly promising five ships to be used against Kaumualii and his Russian allies. On September 12 [O.S. September 24] the American merchant vessel O'Cain landed on Kauai with the merchants, Alexander Adams, Nathan Winship, and Richard Ebbets arriving with the intention to remove the Russian flag hoisted on the island. They were repelled by ten of Kaumualii's guards, who carried bayoneted rifles. June 29 [O.S. June 17] 1817, according to Schaffer's records, all his American employees excluding George Young, the skipper of Kadyak, changed sides and deserted him. Local Hawaiians "bundled Schäffer into a boat" and tried to force him out of Kauai. He returned and after attempting to make a stand at Fort Alexander was forced to board his ships. Schäffer dispatched George Young to sail seaworthy Ilmen to Sitka to bring news of his defeat. He sailed on the crippled, leaking Kadyak to Honolulu harbor in distress. Kamehameha's chiefs warned the Russians that they would immediately arrest Schäffer, but did not act on their claim. According to Schäffer's deputy Timofei Nikitich Tarakanov, the change in attitude was influenced by the Americans seeking to salvage prized sandalwood from the holds of the sinking Kadyak.

On July 7 [O.S. July 19] Schäffer forever left Hawaii for Guangzhou, courtesy of his former patient captain Isaiah Lewis. Between sixty and one hundred Russians and Aleuts from the Kadyak were left stranded on Oahu until the spring of 1818. Schäffer reached Macau where he received support from Anders Ljungstedt, a Swede who occasionally worked for the RAC. Ljungstedt arranged for Schäffer to travel to Rio de Janeiro, and from there he would embark to Europe.

== Aftermath ==
The "Hawaiian spectacular performed by Doctor Schäffer" cost the Russian-American Company between 200,000 and 230,000 rubles. The economic waste caused by Schäffer has been noted, with Americans profiting by supplying Russian America from Hawaii while the RAC was unable to exert control over the islands. The RAC left substantial supplies on Kauai and the managers in Sitka seriously considered sending another armed expedition to repossess them.

The Board of the Company in Saint Petersburg received the first news of the Hawaiian affair in the spring of 1817 and on March 22 (April 3) instructions were sent to Baranov to dismiss Schäffer as soon as he completed his mission. The board openly distrusted the German and feared the international complications that could hurt the core business. Schäffer's victorious reports of his treaty with Kuamualii were delivered to Saint Petersburg in August, and around the same time European newspapers picked up rumors of Russian expansion in the Pacific. The directors of the Company now considered supporting Schäffer, but government approval depended on the opinion of foreign minister Karl Nesselrode who in turn relied on the opinion of Count von Lieven, the ambassador in London.

While waiting for Nesselrode's response, the board began drafting business plans for Schäffer, who was then already on his way to the Qing Empire. In December 1817 Nesselrode received von Lieven's report from London: according to the ambassador, the disadvantages and risks of a Russian protectorate over Kauai outweighed any possible gains. On March 8 [O.S. February 24] 1818 Nesselrode and Emperor Alexander I concurred with von Lieven, consequentially state support to RAC operations in Hawaii was denied. The emperor "did not think it expedient" to establish a protectorate over Kauai, sending orders to the RAC "to refuse the king's request in as friendly a way as possible..." However, Emperor Alexander I sent a medal of the Order of St. Anna to Kaumualii, inscribed to the "Chief of the Sandwich Islands".

The directors, however, petitioned the government for at least an approval of their limited presence in the Hawaii, which was granted in August 1818. In the same month Kotzebue returned to Saint Petersburg, bringing bad news of the events that happened more than a year before; the directors received letters from Schäffer himself, the most recent dated April 1818, from Rio de Janeiro. In a memorandum to the Minister of the Interior in 1818, Schäffer stressed the importance of controlling the profitable Hawaiian markets. The Board of Directors was requested its opinion of pursuing such a project, agreeing that Hawaiian supplies would be of critical use to settlements in Russian America, Okhotsk and on the Kamchatka Peninsula. As before, the RAC refused to act on the proposal until authorized by the Imperial government. Emperor Alexander I approved the company efforts to develop commercial relations with the Kingdom, but again demurred from erecting a Russian protectorate over the Hawaiian islands, finding "the hope of the establishment of the Russians on one of the Sandwich Islands has very little foundation..."

== See also ==
- Russian attempts to colonize Africa

== Bibliography ==
- Alexander, William D. (1894), "Proceedings of the Russians on Kauai. 1814–1816.", Papers of the Hawaiian Historical Society, 6, Honolulu: The Bulletin Publishing Company: 1–21, hdl:10524/976
- Bolkhovitinov, Nikolay (1973), "Adventures of Doctor Schäffer in Hawaii, 1815–1819", Hawaiian Journal of History, 7, translated by Vorobyoff, Igor V., Honolulu: Hawaiian Historical Society: 55–78, hdl:10524/558
- Bolkhovitinov, Nikolay (1997), Russians on the Hawaii, 1804–1825, Istoriya Russkoi Ameriki, vol. 2, Moscow, pp. 276–302, ISBN 5-7133-0883-9, archived from the original on January 22, 2010
- Daws, Gavan (1968), Shoal of time: a history of the Hawaiian Islands, Honolulu: University of Hawaii Press, ISBN 0-8248-0324-8
- Joesting, Edward (1984), Kauai: The Separate Kingdom, Honolulu: University of Hawaii Press, ISBN 978-0-8248-1162-4
- Khlebnikov, Kiril T. (1973), Baranov, Chief Manager of the Russian Colonies in America, translated by Pierce, Richard A., Kingston, ON: The Limestone Press, ISBN 978-0919642508
- Mills, Peter R. (2002), Hawaii's Russian adventure: a new look at old history, Honolulu: University of Hawaii Press, ISBN 978-0-8248-2404-4
- Pierce, Richard (1965), Russia's Hawaiian Adventure, 1815–1817, Berkeley: University of California Press
