= Lebedinka, Voronezh Oblast =

Lebedinka Лебединка
- Selo
- Location within Voronezh Oblast Location within Russia
- Coordinates: 49°39′N 40°25′E
- Country: Russia
- Region: Voronezh Oblast
- District: Bogucharsky District
- Time zone: UTC+3:00

Lebedinka (Russian: Лебединка) is a rural locality (a selo) and the administrative center of Pervomayskoye Rural Settlement, Bogucharsky District, Voronezh Oblast, Russia. The population was 760 as of 2010. There are 8 streets.

== Geography ==
Lebedinka is located on the right bank of the Levaya Bogucharka River, 44 km south of Boguchar (the district's administrative centre) by road. Novonikolsk is the nearest rural locality.
