= Skete of Saint Andrew =

- Skete of St. Andrew
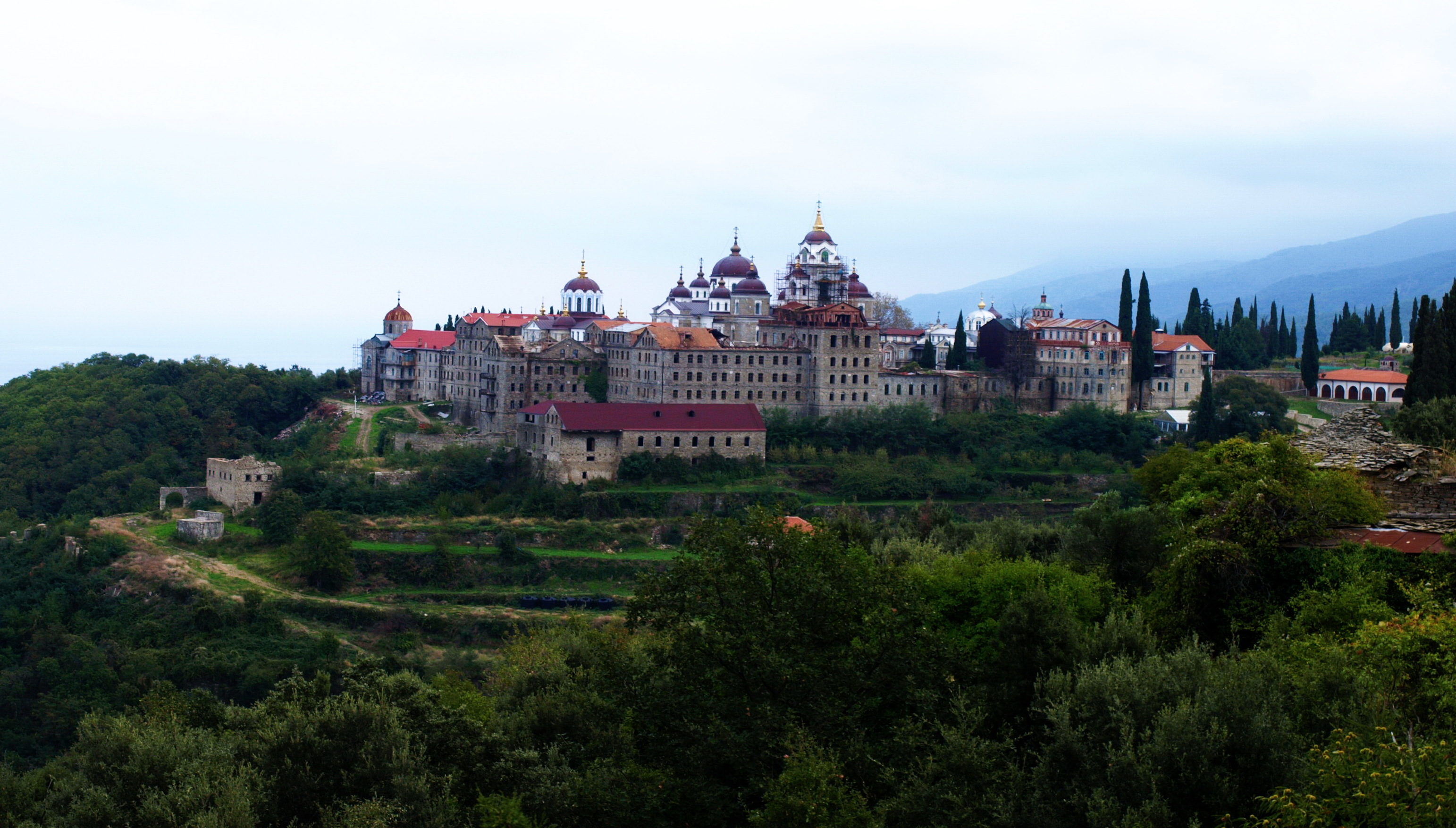

- Location within Mount Athos
- Interactive map of Skete of Saint Andrew

Monastery information
- Order: Greek Orthodox

Site
- Location: Mount Athos; Greece
- Coordinates: 40.2621°N 24.2444°E
- Public access: Men only

The Skete of Saint Andrew, also the Skete of Apostle Andrew and Great Anthony or Skiti Agiou Andrea in Karyes is a monastic institution (skete) on Mount Athos. It is a dependency of Vatopedi Monastery and is the site of the Athonias Ecclesiastical Academy.

== History ==
The skete (a smaller, dependent monastic house) had its origins when Patriarch Athanasius II of Constantinople retired to Mount Athos in the mid fifteenth century after the Fall of Constantinople and settled in a Monastic House on the site of the old Monastery of Xistrou that was dedicated to St. Anthony the Great. This house later became the foundation of the skete. In 1761, Patriarch Seraphim II of Constantinople also retired to Mount Athos and replaced the old house with a new building that he dedicated to the Apostle Andrew as well as St. Anthony.

In 1841, Seraphim's house was given by the Monastery of Vatopaidion to two Russian monks, Bessarion and Barsanouphios. Initially known as the Cell of St. Anthony, in 1842, the monastics, under the sponsorship of Tsar Nicolas I of Russia, began expanding their residence. With its expansion, Patriarch Anthimus IV of Constantinople recognized the St. Anthony Cell as a skete in 1849. The skete was called that way because the customs and statute of Mount Athos precludes the establishment of new monasteries besides those of the Byzantine era.

With the continued growth of the skete in monastic numbers, a central church, dedicated to Saint Andrew, was built in 1867 and consecrated in 1900 by Patriarch Joachim III of Constantinople. The church is the largest on Mount Athos and is amongst the largest in the Balkans.

=== Twentieth century ===
As the twentieth century began, the skete had grown greatly. Prior to World War I the population of the skete included 700 to 800 Russian monks.

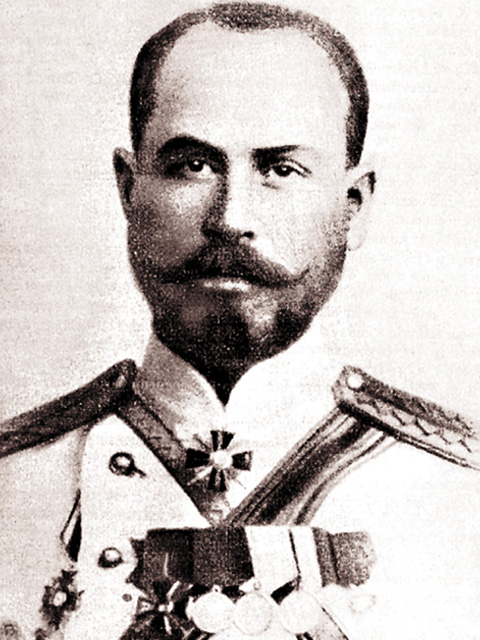
Anthony Bulatovich

One of these monks, Hieromonk Anthony Bulatovich, was regarded as the main proponent of the Imiaslavie doctrine, a dogmatic doctrine which asserts that the Name of God is God Himself. The doctrine was condemned by the Russian Orthodox Church in 1913, (Note: In 1912, a Council of Constantinople was convened and presided over by Ecumenical Patriarch Joachim III, and attended by several bishops, condemning the "Onomatodoxi"/"Imiaslavie" (name-worshippers), who believed that the name of God is God Himself. A second council was held in 1913 and third by the Russians, also in 1913. http://onimyaslavie.blogspot.com/search/label/Imiaslavie) Bulatovich published a few books on the subject. In January 1913 a monk called David, a supporter of imiaslavie, was elected as the hegumen of the skete, taking the place of the monk Hieronim who was an opponent of it. Hieronim did not recognize the results of the elections and complained to the Russian Embassy in Greece. The Imperial Government insisted on changing the hegumen back to Hieronim.

In June 1913 a small Russian fleet, consisting of the gunboat Donets and the transport ships Tsar and Kherson, delivered the archbishop of Vologda, Nikon (Rozhdestvensky), and a number of troops to Mount Athos. The archbishop visited both St. Panteleimon Monastery and the skete of Saint Andrew, where he tried to convince supporters of imiaslavie to change their beliefs voluntarily, but was unsuccessful. On July 31 the troops stormed the St. Panteleimon Monastery. Although the monks were not armed and did not actively resist, the troops showed very heavy-handed tactics. They set up two machine guns and a number of water cannons, and the soldiers were ordered to beat the monks with their bayonets and rifle butts. Allegedly, four monks were killed and at least forty-eight were wounded. After the storming of St. Panteleimon Monastery the monks from the skete of Saint Andrew surrendered voluntarily.

The military transport Kherson was converted into a prison ship. It took 628 monks to Russia and on July 9 set sail to Odessa. Forty monks were left in the Mount Athos hospital, judged unable to survive the transportation. On July 14 the steamship Chikhachev delivered another 212 monks from Mount Athos. The rest of the monks signed papers that they rejected the imiaslavie.

After interrogation in Odessa, 8 imprisoned monks were returned to Athos, 40 were put into jail, and the rest were defrocked and exiled to different areas of the Russian Empire according to their propiska. Bulatovich was sent to his family estate in the village Lebedinka of Kharkov gubernia, to where many imiaslavtsy moved. This, and the further events of World War I and its aftermath, brought disastrous results as the potential for monks from Russia disappeared.

In 1958, the western wing of the skete and library were destroyed by fire and, in 1971, the last monk of the old community died. The community became deserted. In 1992 a new, Greek-speaking brotherhood brought new life to the skete. In 2001, young monks joined in community and deal with the preservation of the icons and the maintenance of the premises.

== Attribution ==
This article incorporates text from Skete of St. Andrew (Athos) at OrthodoxWiki which is licensed under the CC-BY-SA and GFDL.
