= Imiaslavie =

Christian dogmatic movement

Imiaslavie (imyaslavie, Russian: Имяславие, lit. 'name-praisingness' or 'name-glorification'), among critics also known as imyabozhie (Russian: Имябожие) or imyabozhnichestvo (Russian: Имябожничество), "deification of the name", and also referred to as onomatodoxy (Greek: ονοματοδοξία) was a mystical-dogmatic movement in Russian Orthodoxy, the main position of which was the statement of the indissoluble connection between the name of God as the energy and action of God and God Himself. The imiaslavie movement emerged early in the 20th century, but both proponents and opponents cite alleged antecedents throughout the history of Christianity. Advocates claim that the idea is traceable to the Church Fathers, while opponents claim to trace it to ancient heresiarchs.

In 1913 the teachings of the imyaslavites were officially condemned as heretical by the Most Holy Synod, and the turmoil that arose in the Russian monasteries on Mount Athos due to disputes over this teaching was suppressed using Russian armed force. The theological controversy that arose in connection with the teachings of the Imiaslavie revived interest in the legacy of St Gregory Palamas and the Hesychasts in Russia and had a noticeable impact on the development of Russian religious and philosophical thought in the first half the 20th century.

Although no authentic groups of imyaslavites have survived (they were defeated by the Soviet power), nevertheless, interest in the imiaslavie theme revived at the turn of the 1990s – 2000s. Some Russian religious thinkers and theologians of the Russian Orthodox Church expressed a certain sympathy for some of the ideas of the imyaslavites. Several True Orthodox jurisdictions of different ideological orientations expressed their categorical support for imiaslavie, considering the denial of the imiaslavie teaching as heresy.

== Beginning ==
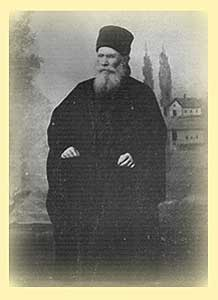
Schema-monk Hilarion

The 20th-century history of imiaslavie started in 1907 with the publication of the book On the Mountains of Caucasus by a revered schema-monk Hilarion (Domrachov). In his book, Hilarion told of his spiritual experience with the Jesus Prayer as a proof that "The name of God is God Himself and can produce miracles". The book became extremely popular among the Russian monks on Mount Athos (then in the Ottoman Empire, now in Greece). Many of them argued that since, according to Plato and the Stoics, names and forms pre-exist their corresponding "sensual manifestations in the world", so the name of God must have existed before Creation, and that the Holy Name cannot be anything but God Himself. Among other things, this was thought to mean that knowledge of the secret name of God alone allows one to perform miracles (a similar concept exists in Kabbalah).

== Persecution on Mount Athos ==
Both schemamonk Hilarion's book on Hesychasm and hieroschemamonk Anthony Bulatovich’s book defending Name-Glorification drew many monks of Mount Athos into the controversy. Ecumenical Patriarchs Joachim III of Constantinople and Germanus V of Constantinople and the Russian Most Holy Synod issued condemnations of Name-Glorification as pantheistic, but without ever interviewing its supporters. Name-Glorifiers on Mount Athos were denied mail and money transfers, as well as the Mysteries. On 17 June 1913 the Imperial Russian Navy steamship Tsar arrived at Mount Athos with Archbishop Nikon (Rozhdestvensky), Professor Sergey Troitsky, 118 soldiers and 5 officers to enforce the ruling of the Most Holy Synod. That same day, the Protos, the monastic office of the Eastern Orthodox monastic state of Mount Athos, announced that if the "heretics" were not removed from the area, then all of the Russians would be expelled by the Greeks.

On 16 July 1913, the Kherson arrived and the Russian soldiers began arresting unarmed Name-Glorifiers. Shebunin, the Russian consul in Constantinople, ordered the 6th Company of the 50th Białystok Regiment to take them by storm, but without bloodshed. These soldiers were made drunk for this purpose by Archimandrite Misail, head of St. Panteleimon Monastery, resulting in bloodshed. The Kherson doctor's registry lists 46 monks from St. Panteleimon as injured and four allegedly killed. This occurred on the feast day of the miraculous icon of the Mother of God Galaktotrophousa ("Milk-Giver"), enshrined at Hilandar Monastery of the Serbians. More Name-Glorifiers at the Skete of Saint Andrew were arrested on 19 July without confrontation.

The steamer with the captured monks stood near Athos until 22 July. Forty of the injured were sent to the Mount Athos hospital and the remaining 621 monks (418 from St. Panteleimon's and 183 from St. Andrew's) were shipped to Odessa. Upon arrival, customs agents seized all of their possessions which were never returned. After interrogation in Odessa, 8 monks were deported back to St. Andrew's, 40 were jailed, and the rest had their hair and beards shaved, were defrocked, and were resettled in the cities of their homeland. Those who were priests were forbidden to hold liturgies, while many were denied the sacraments for the rest of their lives, and at death were deprived the last rites and a Christian burial. On 17 July 1923, another 212 monks who opted to voluntarily leave Mount Athos arrived in Odessa on the steamer Chikhachev, some wearing Jewish kippot as ritual mockery. The population of Russian monks on Mount Athos, recorded as being 3,496 in 1910, shrank to 1,914 by 1914.

=== Proponents and opponents ===
The main proponent of the Imiaslavie doctrine was Anthony Bulatovich, a Hieromonk of St. Andrew's who published books on the subject. Those who promote this doctrine claim support from the writings of Saint John of Kronstadt, and the influential mystic and healer Grigori Rasputin, the popularly styled "mad monk" closely associated with the Russian imperial family shortly before the October Revolution. Saint John of Kronstadt died before this controversy erupted, and his quotes, it can be argued, were taken out of context to support a whole set of ideas that were not found in his own writings. One of the most precise definitions of the Imiaslavie position comes from its advocate Aleksei Losev: "the exact mystical formula of Imiaslavie will sound like this: a) the name of God is energy of God, inseparable from the essence of God itself, and therefore is God himself. b) However, God is distinct from His energies and from His name, and that is why God is not His name or a name in general”

== Aftermath ==
On 27 August 1914 Bulatovich asked to serve as an Army chaplain in World War I, and the Holy Synod granted his request. He sent two letters to Tsar Nicholas II between 1914 and 1916. His 1914 letter said that Russian military reverses might be attributable to the persecution of Imiaslavie: "What further disasters this will lead Russia to, only God knows this”.

On 1 July 1915 the Holy Synod received a letter from the original author, starets and schema-monk Hilarion, asking whether he was expelled from the Church; Hilarion lived as a hermit in the Caucasus Mountains and seems to have been unaware of the controversy and unrest his book caused. Hilarion stated in July 1915 that the persecution coming from "the highest members of the Russian hierarchy, is a sure omen of the proximity of times in which the last enemy of truth, the all-pernicious Antichrist, has to come." Hilarion died on 2 June 1916, without having received an answer.

In September 1917 the Pomestny Sobor of the Russian Orthodox Church was convened to resolve the Imiaslavie question, with both proponents and opponents present. The work of the Sobor was aborted due to the October Revolution. Among the theologians who advocated for Imiaslavie were Pavel Florensky and Sergey Bulgakov. Bulatovich's second letter to the Tsar in 1916 noted that he "correlates the military failures of Russia in World War 1 at the front with the struggle of the Synod against Name-Glorification".

Bishop Hilarion (Alfeyev) wrote in 1999 that: “Even though the movement of the 'Name-worshippers' was crushed at the beginning of the century on the orders of the Holy Synod, discussion of the matter regained impetus in the years preceding the Moscow Council (1917–18), which was supposed to come to a decision about this but did not succeed in doing so. Thus the Church's final assessment of Name-worshipping remains an open question to this day."

== Analysis ==
Social psychologist Professor Martin Bauer frames this as a conflict over "representation" which "centres on the issue of whether a word is more than just a flatus voci (Latin for a vocal fart)."

== See also ==
- Sergei Bulgakov
- Pavel Florensky
- Hesychasm
- Holy Name of Jesus
- Jesus Prayer
- Logos
