= Alexander Bulatovich =

Russian army officer, explorer and writer (1870–1919)

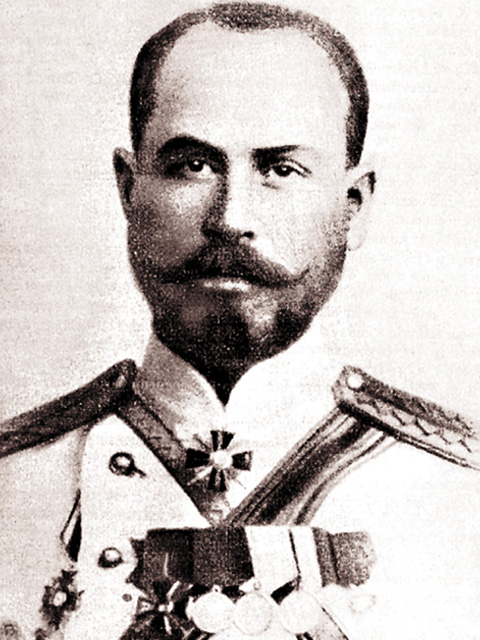
Alexander Bulatovich

Alexander Ksaverievich Bulatovich (Russian: Алекса́ндр Ксаве́рьевич Булато́вич; 26 September 1870 – 5 December 1919) tonsured Hieroschemamonk Anthony (Russian: Иеросхимонах Антоний) was a Russian military officer, explorer of Africa, writer, hieromonk and the leader of the imiaslavie movement in Eastern Orthodox Christianity.

== Early life and education ==
Alexander was born to a family of Oryol nobility and was of Russian/Belarusian, French, Georgian, and Tatar descent. He studied in Tsarskoye Selo Lyceum, then served in the Hussar Leib Guard regiment.

== Military service ==
In 1896, he was a member of the Russian mission of the Red Cross in Ethiopia, where he became a confidant of Negus Menelek II of Ethiopia. Bulatovich later joined the expedition of Ras Welde Giyorgis Aboye and became the first European to provide a scientific description of Kaffa province (later conquered by Menelek II wherein Bulatovich was in Menelik's forces). He was the first European to reach the mouth of the Omo River. Among the places named by Bulatovich is the Nicholas II Mountain Range. He had to ask permission from the Tsar himself to name the range in his honour.

After Bulatovich returned to Russia, he received a Silver Medal from the Russian Geographical Society for his work in Ethiopia and the military rank of a poruchik (later Rittmeister) of the Leib Guard Hussars. He served in Saint Petersburg. In 1903, after his talks with Saint John of Kronstadt, he resigned from the Imperial Russian Army and became a monk (later hiero-schema-monk) of the Russian Skete of Saint Andrew near the much larger St. Panteleimon Monastery on Mount Athos in Greece. He also visited Ethiopia again, this time trying to establish a Russian Orthodox Monastery there. He was tonsured as Father Antony and became known as Hieromonk Antony Bulatovich.

In 1907, after reading the book On Caucasus Mountains by the schema-monk Hilarion (Domrachov), he became one of the leaders of the imiaslavie movement within the Russian Orthodox Church. When the movement was proclaimed a heresy and disbanded by Russian military force in 1913, he was in St. Petersburg pleading the cause of monks.

He continued to push for official recognition of the imiaslavie. He published many theological books proving the movement's dogmas, obtained an audience with the Nicholas II to discuss the matter, and eventually managed to secure some sort of rehabilitation for himself and his imiaslavtsy comrades. They were allowed to return to their positions in the Church without repentance.

On August 28, 1914, shortly after the outbreak of World War I, Bulatovich received permission to rejoin the Imperial Russian Army as an army priest. Over the course of the war, Bulatovich went beyond his role as a priest and on "many occasions, led soldiers to attack" for which he was awarded the Cross of St. George.

== Later life ==
After returning from the war, he took part in discussions on the imiaslavie. In October 1918, the Holy Synod of the Russian Orthodox Church canceled the decision allowing imyaslavtsy to participate in church services provided they repent. The decision was signed by Patriarch Tikhon of Moscow. In January 1919, Bulatovich ceased all relations with the Holy Synod and Tikhon and returned to his family estate in Lebedinka, where he started a small skete and lived as a hermit. He was the spiritual opponent of any civil war.

== Death ==
On the night of December 6, 1919, he was murdered. There are conflicting accounts regarding who the killers were; either they were deserters of the White Army or the Red Army or some unaffiliated robbers.

== Bulatovich in Russian literature ==
Antony Bulatovich was most probably the original for the grotesque Schema-Hussar Alexei Bulanovich from the novel The Twelve Chairs by Ilf and Petrov. He is also the hero of Valentin Pikul's story The Hussar on a Camel. In addition he is the hero of the novel The Name of Hero by Richard Seltzer (published by Houghton Mifflin in 1981). The complete text of that novel is online for free at http://www.seltzerbooks.com/hero.html "Mazepa! Layers of Legend," short story by Richard Seltzer inspired by Bulatovich's life. Online for free at https://medium.com/@seltzer_57387/mazepa-layers-of-legend-1d4173fea9dd

== Writings ==
- A. K. Bulatovich, Ethiopia Through Russian Eyes: Country in Transition, 1896-1898, translated by Richard Seltzer, 2000, ISBN 1-56902-117-1. http://www.seltzerbooks.com/russianeyes.html
- A. K. Bulatovich, With the Armies of Menelik II translated by Richard Seltzer http://www.seltzerbooks.com/armies.html
- A. K. Bulatovich, From Entotto to the River Baro translated by Richard Seltzer http://www.seltzerbooks.com/entotto.html
- A. K. Bulatovich, My Third Journey to Ethiopia, 1899-1900 translated by Richard Seltzer http://www.seltzerbooks.com/thirdjourney.html

== See also ==
Russian people in Ethiopia

- Leonid Artamonov
- Nikolay Leontiev
- Nikolay Gumilyov
