= Nikolay Leontiev =

Russian explorer (1862–1910)

- Николай Леонтьев
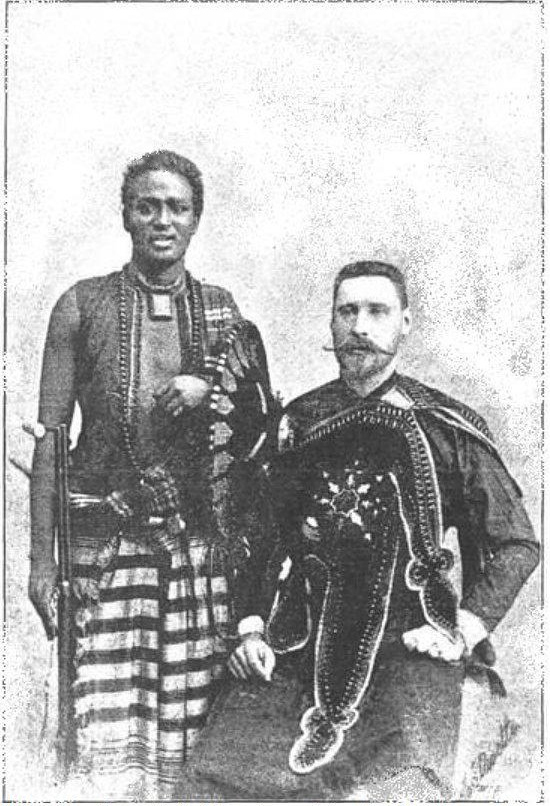
- Leontiev in Ethiopia, 1898
- Born: October 26, 1862; Malaya Berezovka, Aleksandriya uezd, Kherson Governorate, Russian Empire
- Died: 1910 (aged 47–48); Paris, France
- Occupations: Military officer, geographer, writer

Nikolay Stepanovich Leontiev, 1st Count of Abai, (Russian: Никола́й Степа́нович Леонтьев; 26 October 1862 – 1910) was a Russian military officer, geographer and traveler, explorer of Africa, writer, and veteran of the Boxer Rebellion, and the Russo-Japanese War.

== Biography ==
Leontiev was born on 25 February 1862 to a noble family in Kherson Province. He studied in Nikolaev's Cavalry military school, then served in the Uhlan Leib Guard regiment. In 1891, he became esaul of a military reserve force of the Umansk regiment of the Kuban Cossack army.

Like Mashkov and Ashinov before him, Leontiev had dreamed of going to Ethiopia and for many years he collected information about the country. Finally, Leontiev was able to go to Ethiopia on a research trip. Famous scientists, the Science Academy and the Russian Geographical Society took great interest in this programme. But the main task of the Leontiev expedition was to establish friendly relations between Russia and Ethiopia.

Leontiev embarked on his journey to Ethiopia in January 1895 without telling the Russian government. He ingratiated himself to Menelik II, claiming to possess a letter to him from the Czar. Menelik sent Leontiev as the head of his first diplomatic mission to Russia, ostensibly to place a wreath on the tomb of Alexander III. It is unclear whether Menelik believed Leontiev's claims or merely wanted to get rid of him. In sending Leontiev back to Russia, Menelik abrogated an agreement with Italy that forbade such diplomatic missions. Leontiev escorted the Ethiopian mission to Saint Petersburg where they met Tsar Nicholas II. The Tsar learned of the diplomatic mission when they had already reached Cairo, and despite having no affiliation with Leontiev could not turn him back without risking embarrassment. Leontiev elevated the ranks of his traveling companions, giving himself the title of colonel despite being discharged from the army as a lieutenant and naming another member of his entourage a bishop despite no such title existing in the Ethiopian church. Nicholas II assured the Ethiopian mission that they would never recognize an Italian protectorate over Ethiopia. Seeking to hasten the departure of Leontiev as the Russian press began to discover his fraudulent credentials, Nicholas II sent him back to Ethiopia on an officially sanctioned mission. Italy became concerned about Leontiev's meddling in Ethiopia and rumors proliferated that his role was indicative of greater covert Russian involvement. Rumors and Italian fears of Russian subversion increased Leontiev's influence and the impact of his self-promotion.

According to Paul B. Henze, during the First Italo-Ethiopian War, Leontiev travelled around Europe and busied himself as a self appointed Ethiopian emissary to Italy, the Tsar and various other European dignitaries. In late 1895, Leontiev traveled to Europe and offered his services to Italy as a mediator in their conflict with Ethiopia. He was refused by the Italian treasury department but later told the Russian government that he had been offered two million lire to secure an agreement.

Leontiev had arrived at Djibouti on 28 February 1896. Before leaving Djibouti on 4 March 1896, Leontiev had heard of the Ethiopian victory at the Battle of Adwa and arrived in Addis Ababa in May 1896. According to his diary, Emperor Menelik II then commissioned him to take a letter to the Tsar Nicholas II. He had also claimed that a group of Italian prisoners were also released to him to be sent home in honor of the Tsar's coronation. Raymond Jonas wrote that Menelik likely assigned Leontiev to escort the prisoners in order to rid himself of the adventurer. Once he reached the African coast, Leontiev contacted the Italians and claimed to have been given the authority to negotiate the release of the remaining Italian prisoners, but the Italians did not believe him.

According to a questionable illustrated book he published, Leontiev participated in one of the military expeditions to the region of Lake Rudolf alongside several thousand Ethiopian soldiers, and a number of Cossacks. A brigade lost 216 persons as killed or injured, Shedevr was injured and the Cossack Gogasov perished. Leontiev was able to solemnly report to the emperor Menelik II, how the young romantic poruchik Shedevr solemnly raised the flag of Ethiopia above one of banks of Lake Rudolf.

Also according to his book, Leontiev organized the first modern battalion of the regular Ethiopian army and presented it to Menelik in February 1899. Leontiev formed the first regular battalion, the kernel of which became the company of volunteers of former soldiers he invited from Senegal, who were trained by Russian and French officers. The first Ethiopian military orchestra was organized at the same time.

After being awarded a ceremonial position in Menelik's court, Leontiev involved himself in a number of investment schemes. He claimed that Menelik had appointed him governor-general of "the Equatorial Provinces of Ethiopia" in 1897 and traveled around Europe in 1898 selling shares in a company he claimed would exploit his non-existent mineral rights. He was able to use the buy-in of some early investors to convince others to buy in to the scheme and eventually obtained a number of British, French and Belgian investors. His scheme unraveled when the provinces he claimed to govern were revealed to be thousands of miles south of the Ethiopian border.

Leontiev later organized a second and a third investment scheme under the same pretenses, bribing the Emperor's secretary Ato Gabriel Gobana into signing a document that allowed him a concession to prospect the empire for gold. The trick was discovered immediately by Alfred Ilg who informed the Yosef Neguse who in turn informed Menelik. Menelik II was outraged and in May 1902 ordered Leontiev to leave the country, thus ending his career in Ethiopia.

Leontiev was in Peking with the Russian contingent in 1900 during the Boxer Rebellion. Later, he took part in the Russo-Japanese War.

Leontiev died in Paris in 1910, but his body is buried in Saint Petersburg.

== Awards ==
- (Russian Empire) Order of Saint Vladimir
- (Russian Empire) Cross of St. George
- (Ethiopian Empire) Order of the Star of Ethiopia, 1st Degree
- (Ethiopian Empire) Grand Cordon of the Order of the Seal of Solomon

== See also ==
Russian people in Ethiopia

- Alexander Bulatovich
- Leonid Artamonov
- Nikolay Gumilev
