= Leonid Artamonov =

Russian general and explorer (1859–1932)

Leonid Konstantinovich Artamonov
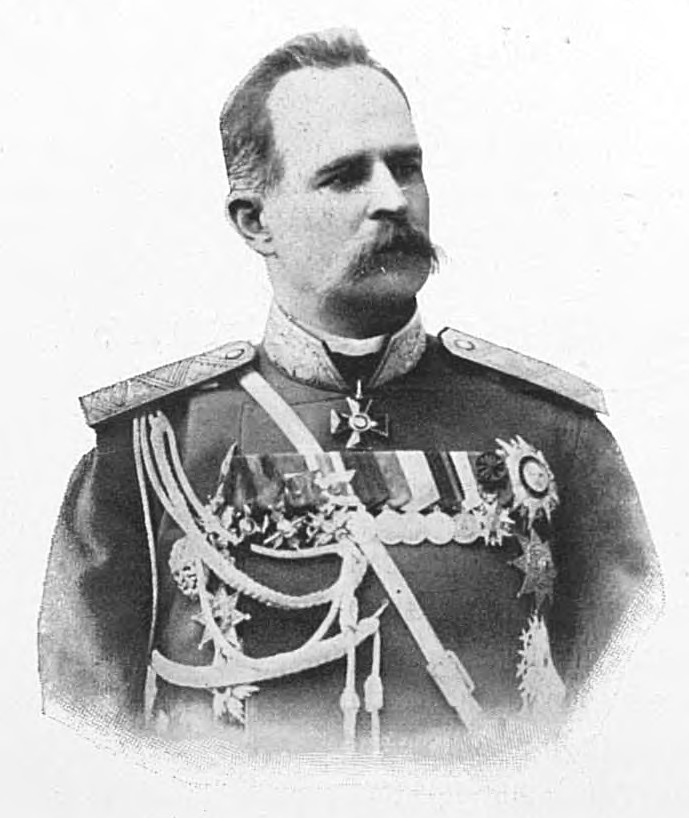
- General Leonid Artamonov, 1900.
- Born: 25 February 1859; Ananyevsky Uyezd, Kherson Governorate, Russian Empire
- Died: 1 January 1932 (aged 72) Leningrad, Russian SFSR, Soviet Union
- Allegiance: Ethiopian Empire; Russian Empire; Soviet Union
- Branch: (Ethiopian Empire) Ethiopian Army (Russian Empire) Imperial Russian Army (Russian Soviet Federative Socialist Republic) Red Army
- Rank: General
- Conflicts: Russo-Japanese War; World War I; Battle of Tannenberg

Leonid Konstantinovich Artamonov (Russian: Леони́д Константи́нович Артамо́нов; 25 February 1859 – 1 January 1932) was a Russian military engineer, adviser and general, geographer and traveler, explorer of Africa, writer, veteran of the First World War and the Russo-Japanese War.

== Biography ==
Leonid Artamonov, was born in the Ananyevsky Uyezd of Kherson Governorate on February 25, 1859. He studied in the Michailovsky Cadet School, then Artamonov after his graduation from the Military Engineering-Technical University in 1883, he also graduated from the General Staff Academy.

In 1897, he was a member of the Russian diplomatic mission to Ethiopia, where he became a military adviser of Negus Menelik II. During 1897–1898, he became a military aide of Menelik during his efforts to modernise the Ethiopian military, which included hiring European experts to provide training to the Ethiopian army. Artamonov was one of a contingent of Russian officer volunteers attached to the forces of Ras Tessema, and joined the expedition of the Ethiopian army to the White Nile and provided assistance during their conflicts with Sudanese forces. He was eventually discharged and returned to Russia, where he enlisted in the Russian Army around the outbreak of the First World War.

He was viewed as a Russian military expert, a competent analyst with combat experience and a strong military and engineering education. But his performance at the Battle of Tannenberg against German forces did not live up to this reputation.

After Artamonov returned to Russia, he became a member of the Russian Geographical Society. He wrote a book Through Ethiopia to the White Nile about his experiences in Ethiopia. He described in detail the democratic experiments of Menelik II in the traditional patriarchal public dialog of the Ethiopian monarchy with its own people, similar to the later speeches of U.S. president Franklin Delano Roosevelt.

In 1899, for his feats and courage he was awarded the Order of the Star of Ethiopia.

He was the leader of group of military analysts and editor of their collected analyses on the Anglo-Boer War, 1899–1902.

He was the commander of the fortresses of Vladivostok (1906) and Kronstadt (1907).

From 1911 until 1914, he was the commander of the First Russian Army Corps. At the Battle of Tannenberg (1914), his corps was to protect the left wing of the 2nd Russian Army. He withdrew his forces without informing his commander Samsonov which contributed to the Russian defeat. For this error, he was relieved of command on August 28.

After 1917, he continued his scientific, engineering and military activity for the Soviet government. In 1927, he was the expert of the Moscow city government. The state gave him an honorable pension. He preferred to live in Saint Petersburg, there he died in 1932.

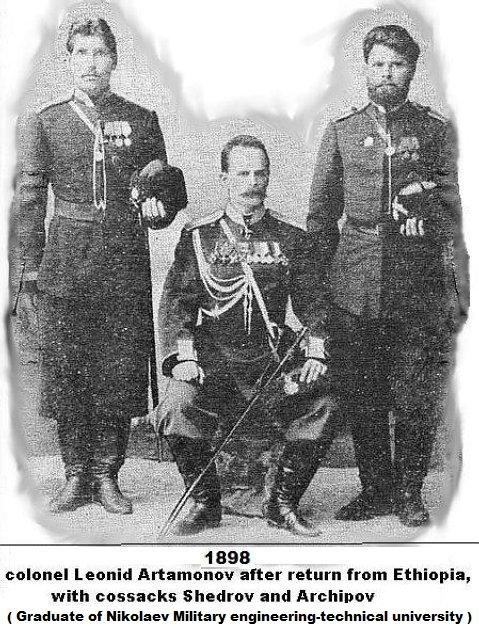
Leonid Artamonov after he returned from Africa

== Writings ==
- Kantselson I. S. Preface // Artamonov L. K. Through Ethiopia to the White Nile. Moscow. 1979.

== Awards ==
- Order of the Star of Ethiopia, 2nd degree (1900)
- Order of Saint Vladimir
- Orders of St. Anna, all degrees (1881, 1882, 1905)
- Order of Saint Alexander Nevsky (1916)
- Order of the White Eagle (1913)
- Order of St. Stanislas
- Personal Golden Weapon for Bravery (1901)
- Order of the Lion and the Sun, 3rd degree

== See also ==
Russian people in Ethiopia

- Nikolay Leontiev
- Alexander Bulatovich
- Nikolay Gumilev
