= Health in Djibouti =

== History ==
The first health care facility in Djibouti was opened in 1897 by the Ethiopian Railways Company, which was later purchased by the state in 1901. It was expanded to include a facility for tuberculosis patients and included 12 new beds for the medically indigent. In 1949, the number of beds increased to 330. Additionally, a laboratory and the ability to treat patients with pulmonary diseases was added. The facility was expanded again in 1953, adding a surgical unit named after Guibert Germain and a blood transfusion unit. The hospital was renamed in 1955 after General Peltier to commemorate his service as a chief physician for 25 years. Additional operating theaters were added the same year. The facility expanded again in 1968 to include a 35 bed maternal ward and 30 beds for eye and ENT.

== Health care ==
In 2010 there were an estimated 23 physicians and 80 nurses per 100,000 people. Since healthcare in the region is so poor, more than a third of the healthcare recipients are migrants. Healthcare is best in the capital; outside the capital it is limited by poor infrastructure, equipment shortages, and a lack of qualified personnel.

There were 56 medical facilities in Djibouti in 2019, including hospitals, medical centers, and health posts. The following are some of the hospitals in Djibouti:

- Al Rahma Hospital, Balbala
- Ali Sabieh Hospital Medical Center, Ali-Sabieh
- Arta Hospital Medical Centre, Arta
- Centre Yonis Toussaint Hospital, Djibouti
- Dikhil District Hospital, Dikhil
- Dr. Chakib Hospital, Djibouti
- French Military Hospital, Djibouti
- Halas Hospital, Djibouti
- Hospital General Peltier (public), Djibouti
- Hospital Bouffard, Djibouti
- Hopital De Balbala "Cheiko", Balbala
- Housseina CNRSR Hospital, Djibouti
- Maternity Hospital Dar-El-Hanan Route Hassan Gouled, Djibouti
- Obock Hospital Medical Centre, Obock
- Service d'Hygiene Hospital, Djibouti
- Tadjourah Hospital Medical Centre, Djibouti

== Issues ==
=== Geographic inequality ===
A lack of infrastructure outside of cities means that rural residents have worse access to healthcare.

== Health status ==
=== Life, maternal, death, and birth rates ===
Life expectancy has increased by 18 years since 1960.

Life Expectancy per 1,000 inhabitants (years)
Year	Male	Female	Total
1960	42.7	45.4	44.0
1970	47.8	50.6	49.1
1980	52.1	55.2	53.6
1990	55.1	58.3	56.7
2000	55.5	58.6	57.0
2010	58.9	61.9	60.4
2014	60.4	63.7	62.0

Infant mortality has decreased by 38.5 deaths per 1,000 live births since 1990.

Infant Mortality per 1,000 live births (deaths)
Year	Male	Female	Total
1990	100.6	84.4	92.7
2000	86.5	72.6	79.7
2010	67.7	56.3	62.2
2015	59.2	49.1	54.2

Djibouti's birth rate is 23.6/1,000 inhabitants, while its death rate is 7.6 deaths/1,000 inhabitants. The maternal rate is 2.29 deaths/1,000 inhabitants. The death rate was 7.73 deaths per 1,000 inhabitants.

=== HIV/AIDS ===
The prevalence of HIV/AIDS in Djibouti was 1.6% of the population for those aged 15–49 years old (9,400 people) as of 2015. In 2015, there were an estimated 600 deaths from AIDS.

=== Women and children ===
As of 2012, 29.8% of children under five were underweight. In Djibouti, 93.1% females had female genital mutilation as of 2006. Female genital mutilation in Djibouti is a leading cause of infant and maternal mortality, and it continues to be prevalent to this day, despite a 1995 law prohibiting the practice.
