= Djibouti Airlines =

IATA	ICAO	Call sign
D8	DJB	DJIBOUTI AIR
- Founded: 1996
- Ceased operations: 2009
- Hubs: Djibouti-Ambouli International Airport
- Destinations: 8 (in 2006)
- Headquarters: Djibouti, Djibouti

Djibouti Airlines was an airline based in Djibouti, Djibouti. It operated regional scheduled and ad hoc charter services using wet leased aircraft out of its base at Djibouti-Ambouli International Airport.

== History ==
Djibouti Airlines was established on 1 February 1996 by former Puntavia director Moussa Rayaleh. It had its commercial transport license revoked on 30 July 2009.

== Destinations ==
Djibouti Airlines operated scheduled services to the following destinations (at December 2006):
Country	City	Airport	Notes
Domestic
Djibouti	Djibouti	Djibouti-Ambouli International Airport	Hub
Africa
Ethiopia	Addis Ababa	Bole International Airport	
	Dire Dawa	Aba Tenna Dejazmach Yilma International Airport	
Somalia	Boosaaso	Bender Qassim International Airport	
Somaliland	Hargeisa	Hargeisa International Airport	
Middle East
United Arab Emirates	Dubai	Dubai International Airport	
	Sharjah	Sharjah International Airport	
Yemen	Aden	Aden International Airport	

== Fleet ==
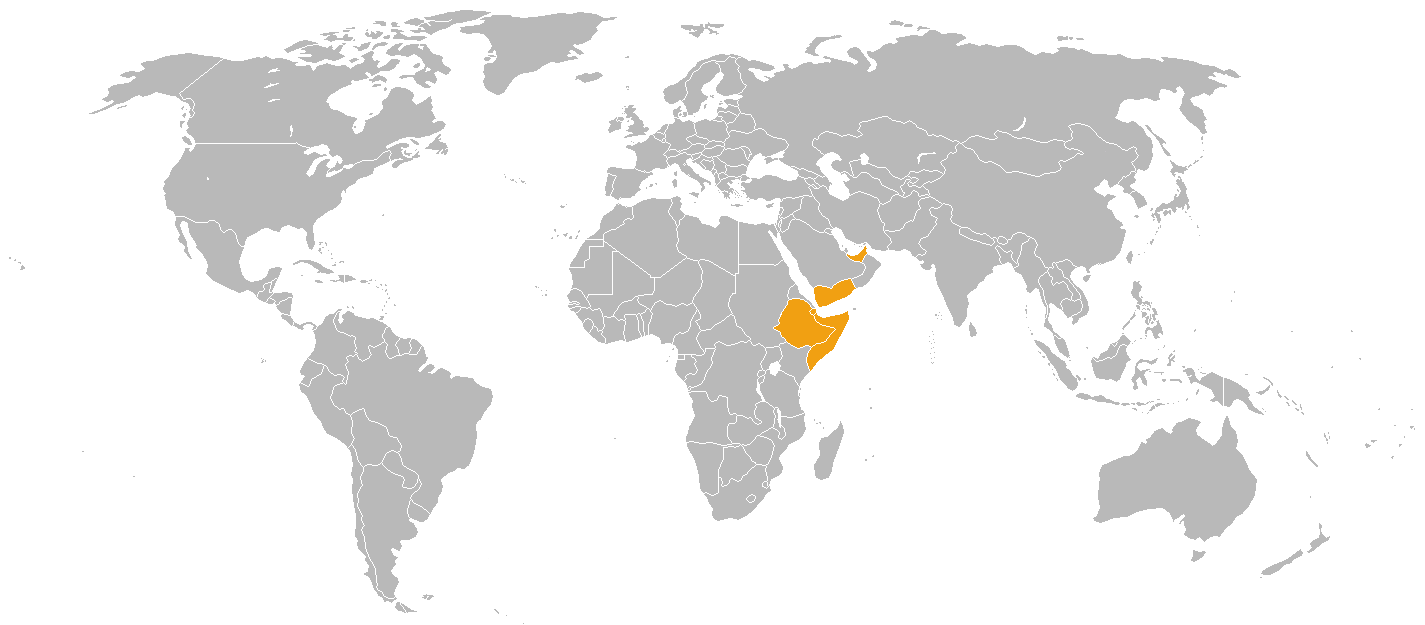
Djibouti Airlines destinations in 2007.

The Djibouti Airlines fleet included the following aircraft types (as of June 2009):

- Antonov An-12
- Antonov An-24RV
- Ilyushin Il-18
- Ilyushin Il-76

== Accidents and incidents ==
- On 17 March 2002 at 18:02 local time, a Djibouti Airlines Let L-410 Turbolet (registered J2-KBC) transport aircraft crashed into the Gulf of Aden shortly off the runway threshold of Djibouti-Ambouli International Airport, where it had attempted to land following a flight from Aden Adde International Airport. All four persons on board were killed.
- On 27 July 2007 at around 13:00 local time, a Djibouti Airlines Antonov An-26 cargo aircraft crash-landed on a field near Shinile, Ethiopia, resulting in the death of one out of the nine persons on board. The aircraft had just left Aba Tenna Dejazmach Yilma International Airport for a flight to Djibouti-Ambouli International Airport when one engine failed.
