= Balbala =

Balbala بلبالا
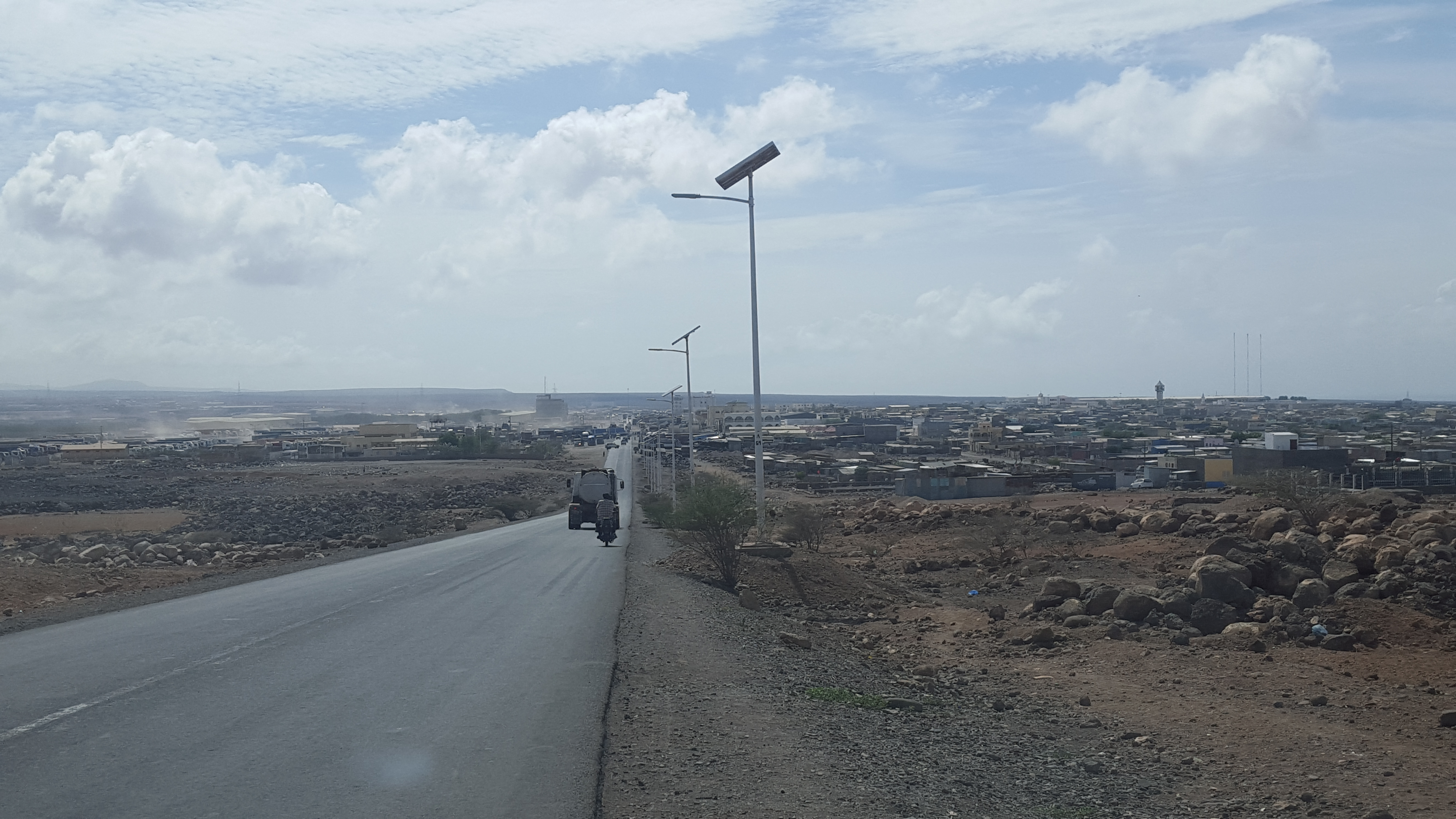
- Balbala from National Route 1

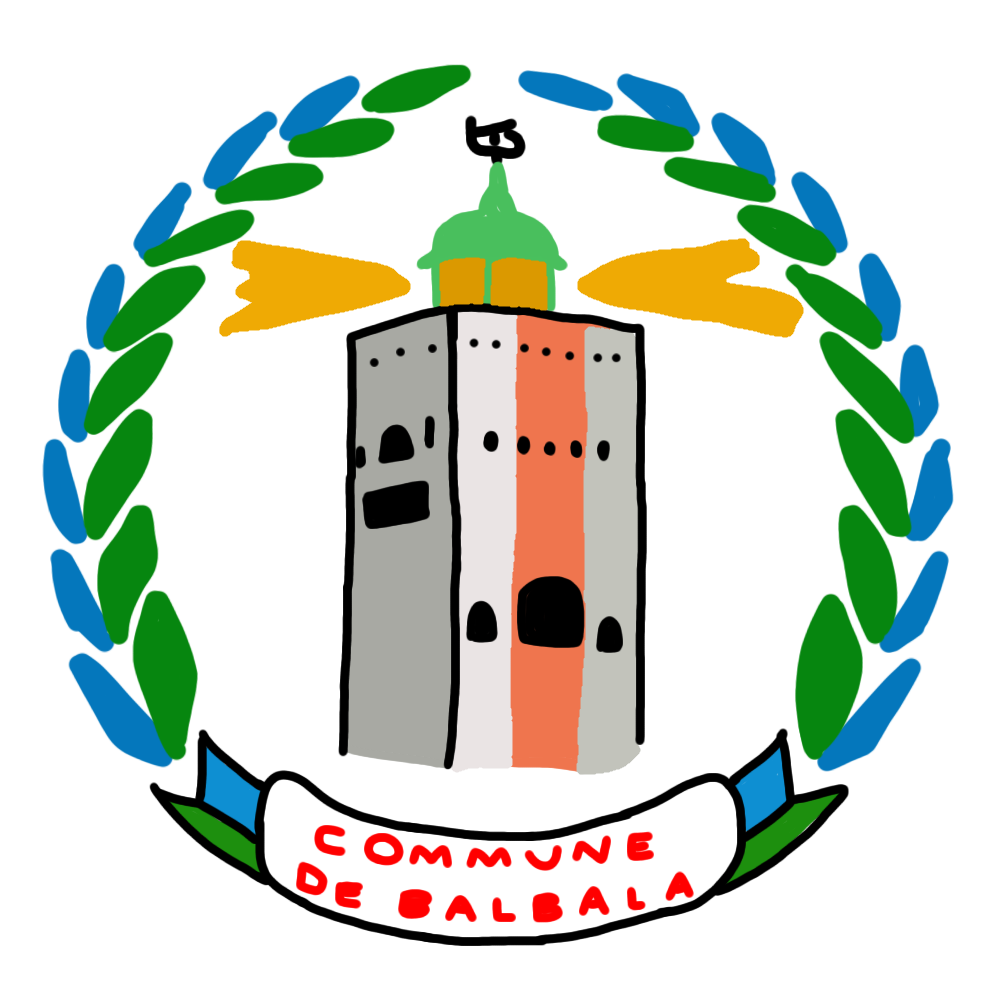
- Seal

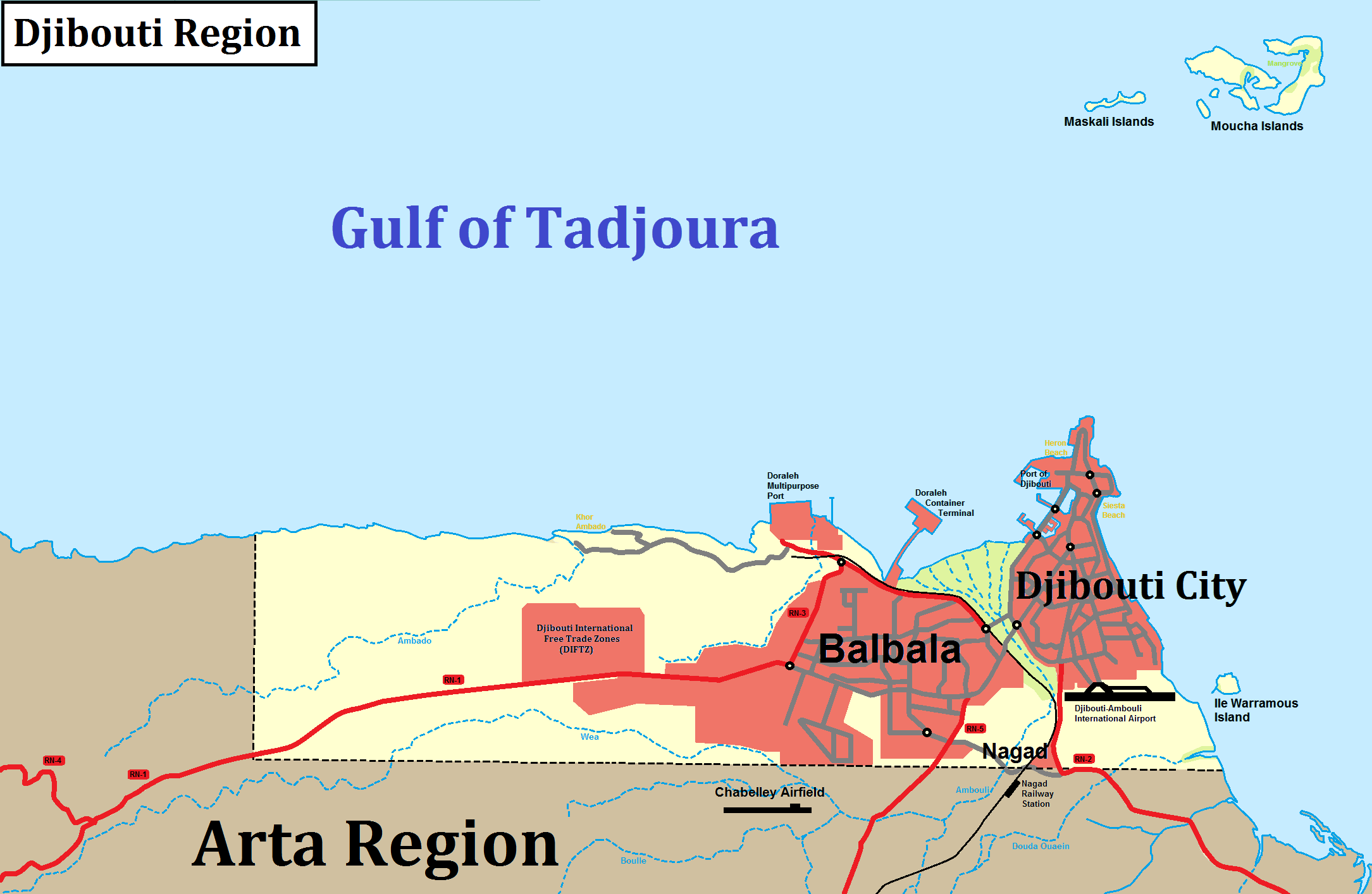
- Location of Balbala within Djibouti Region

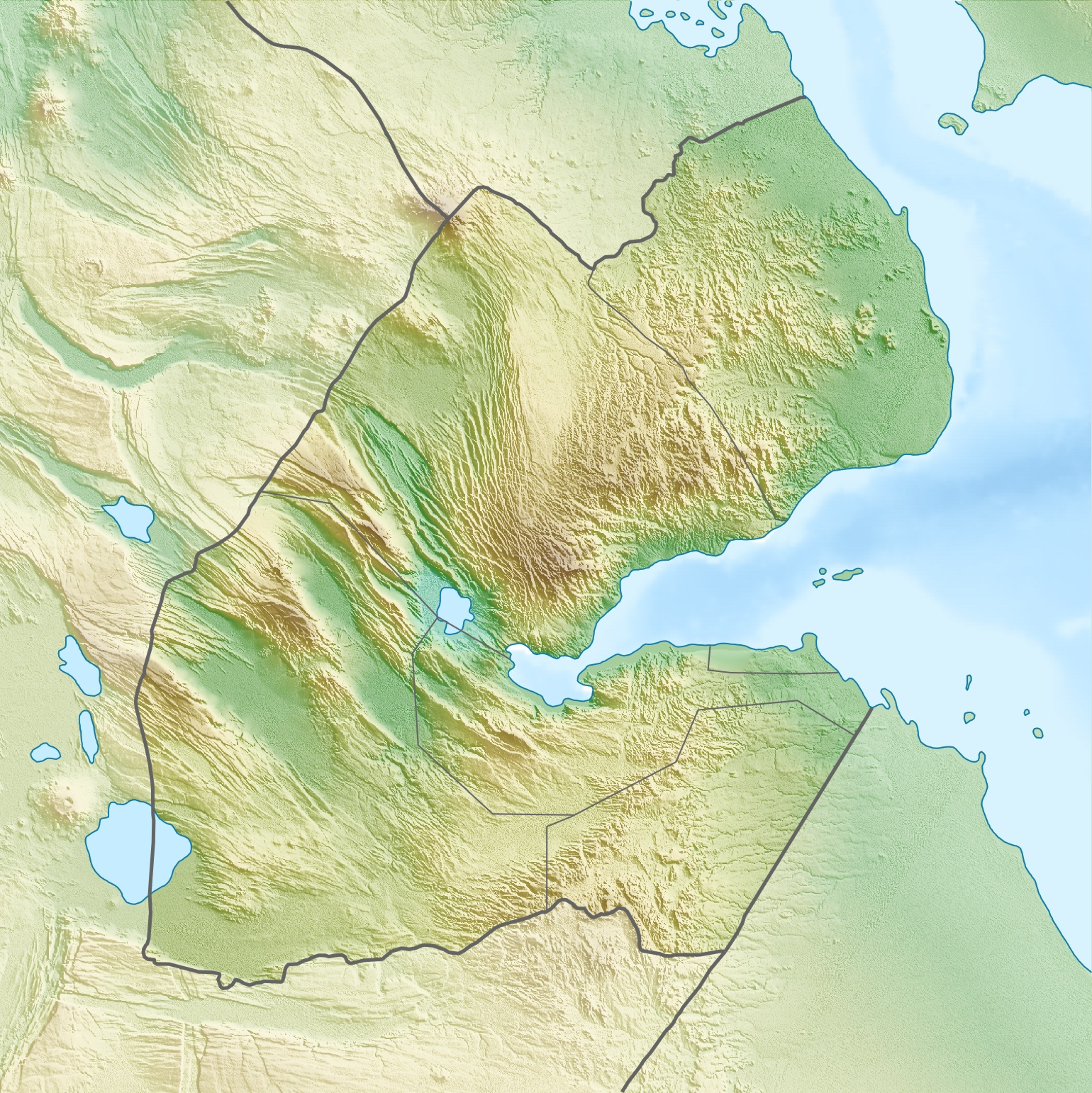
- Location within Djibouti
- Coordinates: 11°33′43″N 43°05′52″E
- Country: Djibouti
- Region: Djibouti Region

Area
  - Total: 128.8 km^{2} (49.7 sq mi)
- Elevation: 60 m (200 ft)

Population (2024 census)
  - Total: 554,350
  - Density: 4,304/km^{2} (11,150/sq mi)
- Time zone: UTC+3 (East Africa Time)

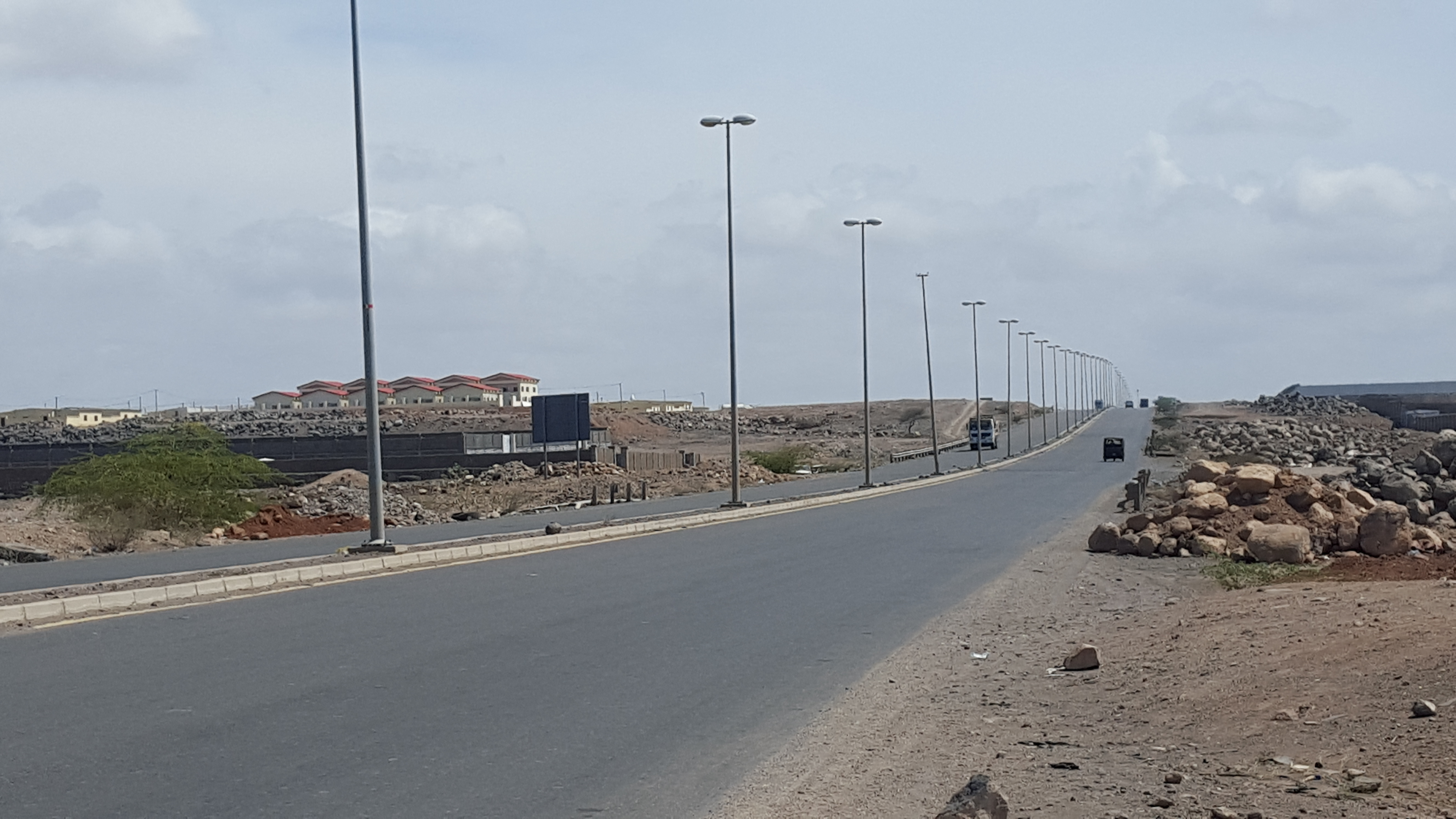
Boulevard Cheikh Maktoum in Balbala

Balbala (Arabic: بلبالا) is a southern suburb of Djibouti City, located west of the river Ambouli. The name is from the "Flashing" (on Somali bal-bal be derived) from the nearby lighthouse. The suburb has formed since 1966 when access to the city was restricted. At first a shanty town, it is now a suburb with schools and a hospital, and a population estimated at 554,350 in 2024.

== History ==
After riots in 1966 a checkpoint was erected in front of the capital of the former French colony to discourage "subversive elements" at the entrance to the city. Upstream of this checkpoint developed a settlement of migrants from other parts of the country, an informal cattle market and a caravan station. Police raids in the city and the subsequent deportation of unwanted newcomers further contributed to the growth of Balbala, which became a large shanty town.

After the independence of Djibouti in 1977, the checkpoint was lifted and Balbala formally transformed into a residential area and integrated into the urban development of Djibouti. Since 1987, it has officially been part of the city. In the first decade after independence, the population of Balbala had tripled again. It then became a new urban district, from the rural exodus. Building rights were gradually transferred to the occupants, and the area acquired urban characteristics, with solid construction and schools and other services. As of 2000, Balbala had four primary schools and the second largest hospital in the country, and its reputation had improved. The population was then estimated at 80,000.

Despite this, much of Balbala remains an area of extreme poverty, with over 80% of the housing composed of corrugated sheeting, planks and metal panels. There is limited access to piped water and electrical power. Infant mortality rates are high.
