= Nimo Boulhan Houssein =

Djiboutian politician

Minister of National Education and Higher Learning
- In office 2009–2011

Personal details
- Born: Djibouti City, Djibouti

Nimo Boulhan Houssein is a Djiboutian politician. She is a Member of the National Assembly of Djibouti and President of the National Assembly's Women's Caucus. She was Minister for the Promotion of Women in 2009 and Minister of National Education and Higher Learning from 2009 to 2011.

== Career ==
Houssein is a Member of the National Assembly of Djibouti and President of the National Assembly's Women's Caucus.

In 2008, Houssein was a delegate to the United Nations High Commissioner for Human Rights' (OHCHR) Committee on the Rights of the Child. She was Minister for the Promotion of Women in 2009 and Minister of National Education and Higher Learning from 2009 to 2011.
