= Dya-Eddine Said Bamakhrama =

Djibouti ambassador

Dya-Eddine Saïd Bamakhrama
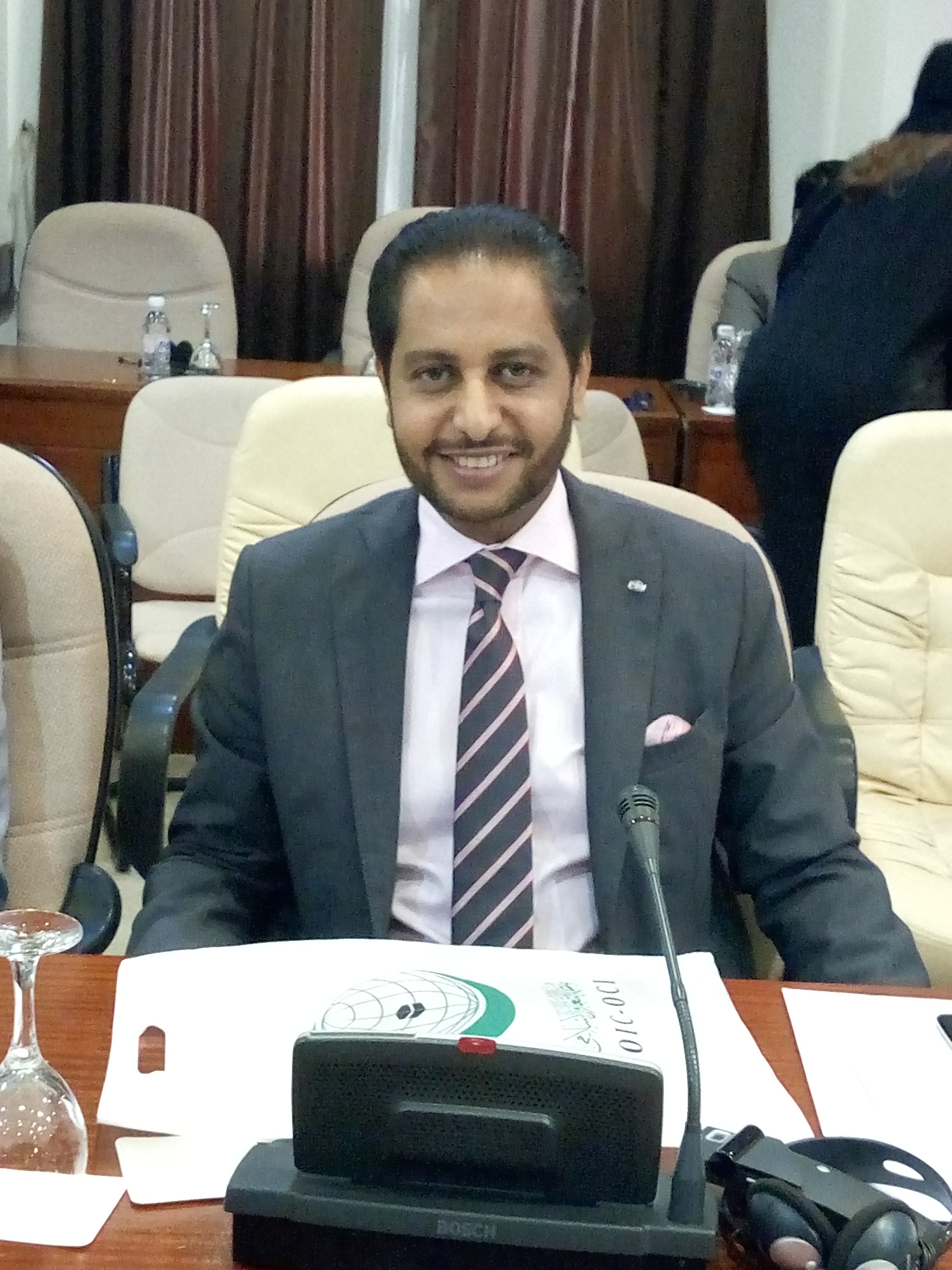
- Born: Dya-Eddine Saïd Abdoulrahim Bamakhrama; November 8, 1966 (age 59); Djibouti City, French Territory of the Afars and the Issas
- Occupations: Ambassador Extraordinary and plenipotentiary of the Republic of Djibouti
- Title: ♦Ambassador extraordinary and plenipotentiary of the Republic of Djibouti to the Kingdom of Saudi Arabia; ♦Dean of the Diplomatic Corps accredited to the Kingdom of Saudi Arabia; ♦Former non-resident ambassador before the opening of Djibouti embassies in Abu Dhabi, Kuwait and Doha; ♦Non-resident ambassador to Oman and Bahrain

Dya-Eddine Saïd Abdoulrahim Bamakhrama (Arabic: ضياء الدين سعيد عبد الرحيم بامخرمة, born November 8, 1966) is the ambassador extraordinary and plenipotentiary of the Republic of Djibouti to the Kingdom of Saudi Arabia and has been Djibouti’s permanent representative to the Organization of Islamic Cooperation (OIC) since 2002. Further, he has been the Dean of the Diplomatic Corps accredited to the Kingdom of Saudi Arabia since 2013.

== Honours ==
He was awarded the National Order of Independence on June 27, the rank of commander in 2017.
