= Women's rights in Djibouti =

Women's rights in Djibouti are a source of concern for various human rights organizations, both within Djibouti and without. While minority groups are represented at all levels of the government, they effectively have no power to alter legislation, due to the repressive nature of the regime. Despite a legal quota that ensures that women hold at least 25 percent of the seats in the National Assembly, they remain underrepresented in leadership positions. Over 60% of women are illiterate. They face barriers to employment and appropriate health care. Rates of female genital mutilation remain high despite campaigns dating back to the 1980s.

== Economy ==
60.5 percent of women are illiterate and only 19 percent of women are employed as compared to 81 percent of men. In Djibouti, according to the National Gender Policy in 2011-2021, women are more affected by extreme and relative poverty and more affected by inactivity than men; women are more numerous than men in the informal sector.

The creation of the Ministry of Women and the Family aims to make significant progress in Djibouti in regards to women's rights.

From research conducted when women were given microcredit loans, a significantly positive association between microcredit and women’s empowerment was observed. Households with access to loans from MFIs are respectively 35.4%, 30.9% and 10.1% more likely to be economically, socially and interpersonally empowered.

Women have faced limited access to financing (from banks and microfinance institutions), mainly due to the lack of bankable projects, the inexistence of financial accounts and the difficulty of providing sufficient guarantees. In response to these challenges, Djibouti’s government adopted a ten-year policy to consolidate its commitment to gender equity and equality in all economic and social areas.

== Healthcare ==
=== Maternal obesity and cesarean delivery ===
Maternal obesity is highly prevalent in Djibouti, a condition which increases the risk of cesarean delivery.

A high rate of cesarean delivery among obese women has been observed in Sub-Saharan Africa, with rates over 50% in some studies.

Prevalence of maternal obesity is high in Djibouti City and is related to an excess risk of cesarean delivery, even after controlling for a range of medical and socioeconomic variables. The present study has shown that maternal obesity is very prevalent in Djibouti City, with rates between 24.8% before 14 weeks of pregnancy and 43.2% at delivery. Rates of cesarean were increased among obese women, especially among primiparae.

International guidelines recommend that obese women should be referred for delivery in a facility with available skilled medical staff, but a recent study showed that the availability of such emergency obstetric care was poor in African hospitals and clinics. However, at the Affi Hospital maternity clinic, midwives, pediatricians, anesthesiologists, and obstetricians are available 24 hours a day.

=== Female genital mutilation ===
Djibouti is the location with the highest rate of female genital mutilation in the world. 93% of women in Djibouti undergo the procedure.

In Djibouti, female genital mutilation is often done in traditional styles, without using sterile and sanitary tools. It involves cutting a part of girls' genitals using cutting utensils such as knives, scissors, rulers, blades or even pieces of glass and then stitching it up with thread; thereafter, things like oil, honey, yogurt and tree leaves are applied to stop the bleeding.

Type IV (infibulation) circumcision includes pricking, piercing, incising, scraping and cauterization. Infibulation is mostly practiced in the Horn of Africa including Djibouti.

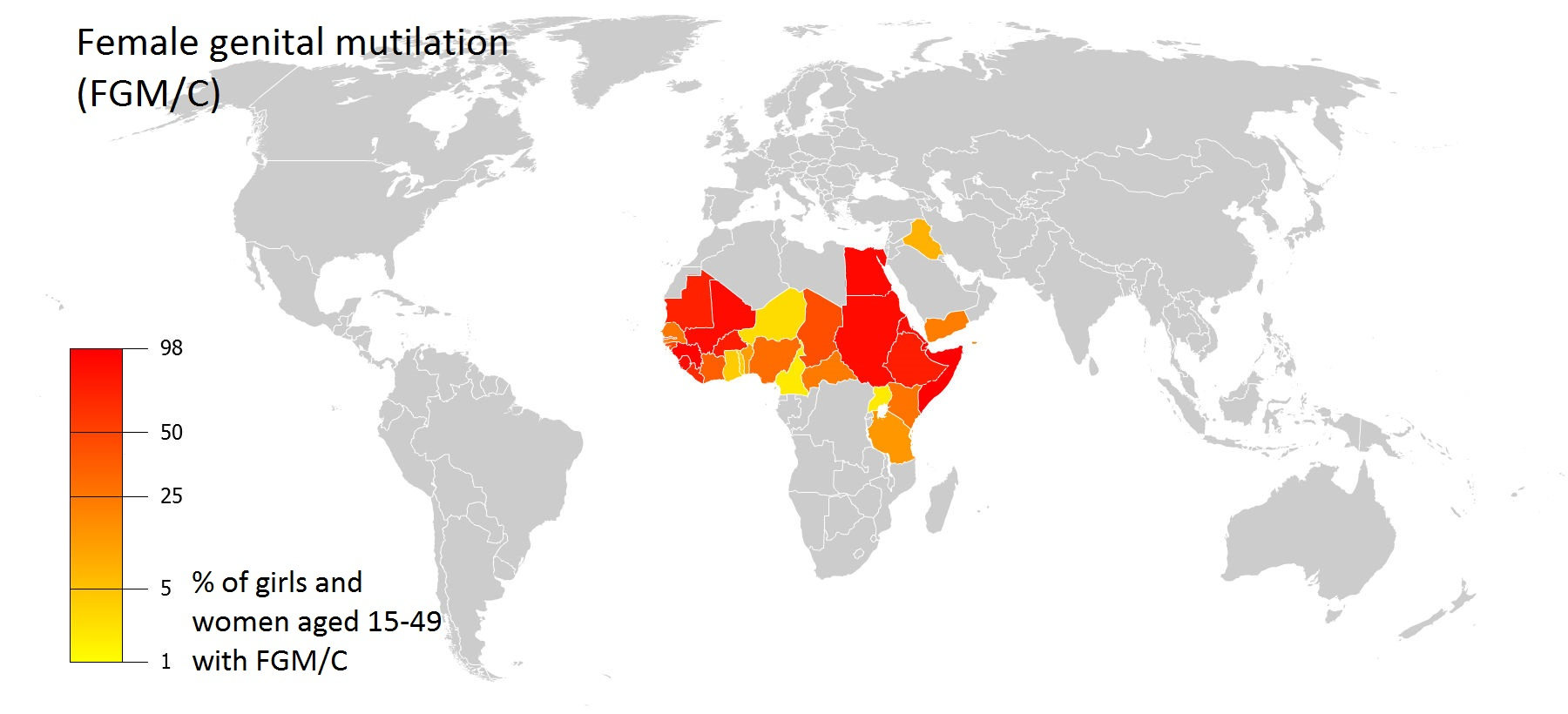
Map showing the prevalence of FGM

Since 1988, concerned authorities in Djibouti have been trying to abolish FGM. This practice was made illegal in 1990 and was specially mentioned as a violation of the rights of women and children. The procedure is usually performed at home in the absence of sterile conditions or anesthesia and by traditional practitioners or trained midwives. For urban populations, infibulation is frequently carried out by health professionals (nurse, midwife, doctor) acting clandestinely.

==== Laws regarding FGM ====
In Djibouti in 1995 and 2009, the government recognized FGM as an act of crime and those who are encouraging or operating female genital mutilation are considered as criminals.

The First Lady launched a campaign in 2008 with the presence of the President of the National Assembly and several Ministers and with the support from the United States Ambassador.

Since 1988, the Djibouti Women's Association has run a huge campaign to ban this tradition.

In 1995, the National Assembly declared illegal and punishable the practice of FGM/C but the article of the National Penal Code related to this issue has never been applied up to present. In 1997 the Ministry of Health assisted with the United Nation Fund for Population (UNFP) promoted the “Project to Fight Female Circumcision” within a larger frame of "restoring the dignity and respect of women" and "to raise the condition of women within society."

==== Consequences of FGM ====
The consequences of this practice are evidenced by the high maternal death rate suffered in Djibouti and Somalia (> 700 per 100 000 live births) where FGM/ C is almost universal when compared to other nearby countries with a similar health and midwifery care but where FGM/C is much less common (Kenya and Tanzania: < 500 per 100 000 live births).

===== Effects of FGM on pregnancy =====
A tight infibulation can be a high risk for the mother and fetus if not handled by a skilled operator. It can lead to an unnecessary cesarean section as a result of the fear of handling infibulated women.

A study was conducted regarding FGM and pregnancy in Djibouti. Overall, 29 of 643 women did not have any form of mutilation (4.5%), as opposed to 238 of 643 women with infibulation (37.0%), 369 with type 2 (57.4%), and 7 with type 1 mutilation (1.1%). Women with a severe type of mutilation were more likely to have socio-economic and medical risk factors. Conclusions: Infibulation was not related with excess perinatal morbidity in this setting with a very high prevalence of female genital mutilation, but future research should concentrate on the relation between infibulation and meconium.

At Peltier General Hospital in Djibouti, both the obstetricians and the midwives have developed a high level of expertise in caring for infibulated women. Women with tight infibulation may be advised to have defibulation. Physicians at the hospital have to demonstrate cultural and ethnic sensitivity while explaining the short- and long-term health risks posed by infibulation. This treatment is regarded as a priority gynecologic procedure.
