= People's Palace, Djibouti City =

Building in Djibouti

The People's Palace
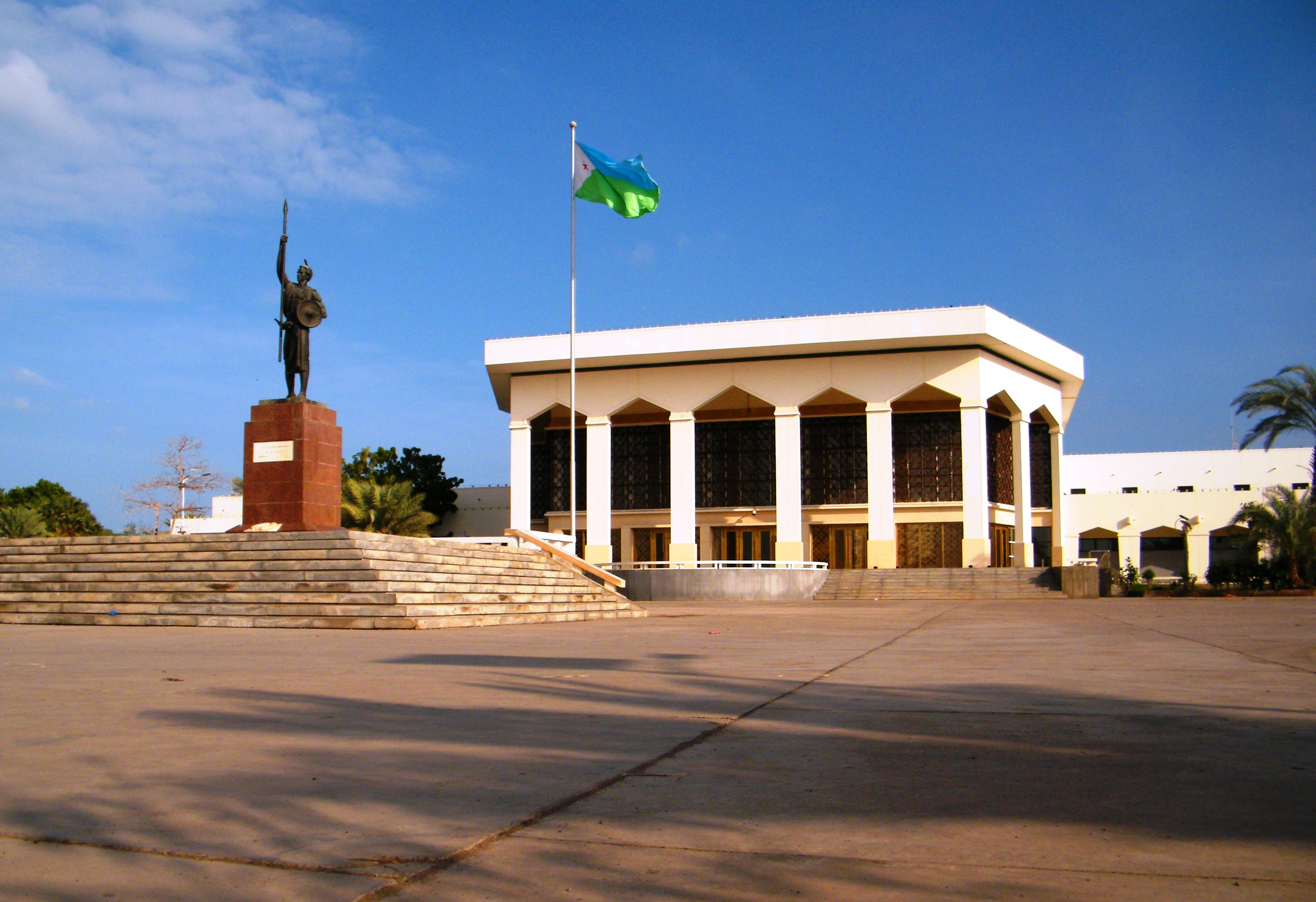
- Interactive map of the The People's Palace area

General information
- Location: Boulevard Bounhour Road, Djibouti City, Republic of Djibouti
- Coordinates: 11.5995°N 43.1473°E
- Opened: 2 March 1985

The People's Palace is a monument in Djibouti City, and is a symbol of struggle for freedom of the people. It is a patriotic monument seeks to pay tribute to one of the most important national symbols of the nation. This is made up of representative elements linked to the ideas of Djiboutian liberators and at the same symbolism that contains the shield of the nomad.

== History ==
The People's Palace was built in 1984 it was a gift from the People's Republic of China (PRC) to the Djiboutians, most visitors start their journeys here to explore the untouched country that is rich historical monuments and history.

== Monument of Martyrs and flag ==
The People's Palace Square contains the Monument of Martyrs who died for the freedom of the Djiboutians. Numerous masts in the square marking the perimeter and all of them are hoisted flags of the Republic of Djibouti are located. it hoisted larger than those in the above waving masts.
