= Puntavia Airline de Djibouti =

Puntavia
IATA	ICAO	Call sign
—	PTV	PUNTAVIA
- Founded: 1991
- Ceased operations: 1996
- Headquarters: Djibouti City, Djibouti

Puntavia Airline de Djibouti was an airline based in Djibouti City in Djibouti. It was founded in 1991 and initially operated Let L410 Turbolets, on irregular scheduled services from Djibouti to Addis Ababa, Jeddah, the Arab states of the Persian Gulf and Somalia. The airline later operated a mixture of Soviet-built aircraft, as well as a leased Boeing 727. Puntavia ceased all operations in 1996.

== Incidents and accidents ==
- On 5 December 1994, a highjacking occurred onboard Puntavia Flight 811 from Berbera to Djibouti City, which was operated using a Let L410 Turbolet (registered J2-KBE). The perpetrator demanded the flight to divert to Saudi Arabia. The situation turned out well, with none of the twelve other passengers and two crew members having been injured.
