= Choukri Djibah =

Djiboutian politician and women's equality activist

Choukri Houssein Djibah
- Born: Djibouti
- Occupations: Politician; women's rights activist
- Employer(s): Ministry of Women and Family (Djibouti)
- Known for: Advocacy for gender equality and the SIHA project
- Title: Director of Gender

Choukri Houssein Djibah is a Djiboutian politician and women's equality activist.

== Career ==
Djibah is the Director of Gender for the Ministry of Women and Family in Djibouti. She has worked in consultation with other members of the government in Djibouti and the United Nations to develop programmes and support for gender justice in her country. She has campaigned for better living and working conditions for women in Djibouti, including calls for the ending of discrimination against women. She has been part of advisory boards providing recommendations for equality for women both for the government and for the UN. In 2011 she represented Djibouti at the IGAD Women in Business conference.

In May 2015 Djibah launched the project SIHA (Strategic Initiative for the Horn of Africa) designed to support and reinforce the economic capacity of women in Djibouti, funded with a grant from the European Union of 28 Million Djibouti francs. In 2019, research by the African Development Bank in conjunction with Djibah's ministry, showed that progress had been made towards gender equality but that women's education was 20% lower than that of men.

=== Controversy ===
Djibah gave up her 25% shareholding in the Horn of Africa Logistics and Trading Group, after public scrutiny.
