= Djibouti Region =

Coordinates: 11°35′N 43°08′E

Djibouti Region Gobolka Jabuuti
- Region (Gobolka - Rakaakay)
- Country: Djibouti
- Administrative centre: Djibouti

Area
  - Total: 200 km^{2} (77 sq mi)

Population (2024 census)
  - Total: 776,966
  - Density: 3,900/km^{2} (10,000/sq mi)
- ISO 3166 code: DJ-DJ

Djibouti Region, also known formerly as Djibouti District, is the capital of the Republic of Djibouti and one of the six regional administrative divisions of the country. With 777,000 residents across a total area of about 80 square miles (200 km2), Djibouti Region is the most populous in Djibouti. It is the smallest region in Djibouti, and contains the national capital, Djibouti.

== History ==
Ambouli in the Djibouti Region is identifies the city with Canbala by O.G.S. Crawford. Canbala appears in Muhammad al-Idrisi's map of 1192 on the coast of the Horn of Africa, southeast of the straits of Bab-el-Mandeb, and with Cambaleh, a town where the Venetian traveler Bragadino, a thirteenth-century European visitor to Ethiopia, resided for eight years. In the mid-19th century and earlier, Djibouti Region was ruled by local authorities with whom France signed various treaties between 1883 and 1887 to first gain a foothold in the region.

== Demographics ==
About 70% of Djibouti's population lives in the coastal plain, much of them in the Djibouti City area.

== Geography ==
=== Topography ===
The region borders the Arta Region to the south and west, and to the north Gulf of Tadjoura. The landscape around the region, along the Djibouti's coastal plain, is a semi-desert. It is a geographical region defined morphologically by the sea, in terms of topography and soil, and also in its climate, flora and fauna.

=== Vegetation ===
The region has a rich in plant species partly because of its diversity of habitats, including beaches, mangroves and semi-arid lands. The most prevalent plant communities are the African foxtail grass, Urochondra, Panicum turgidum and Acacia tortilis.

=== Climate ===
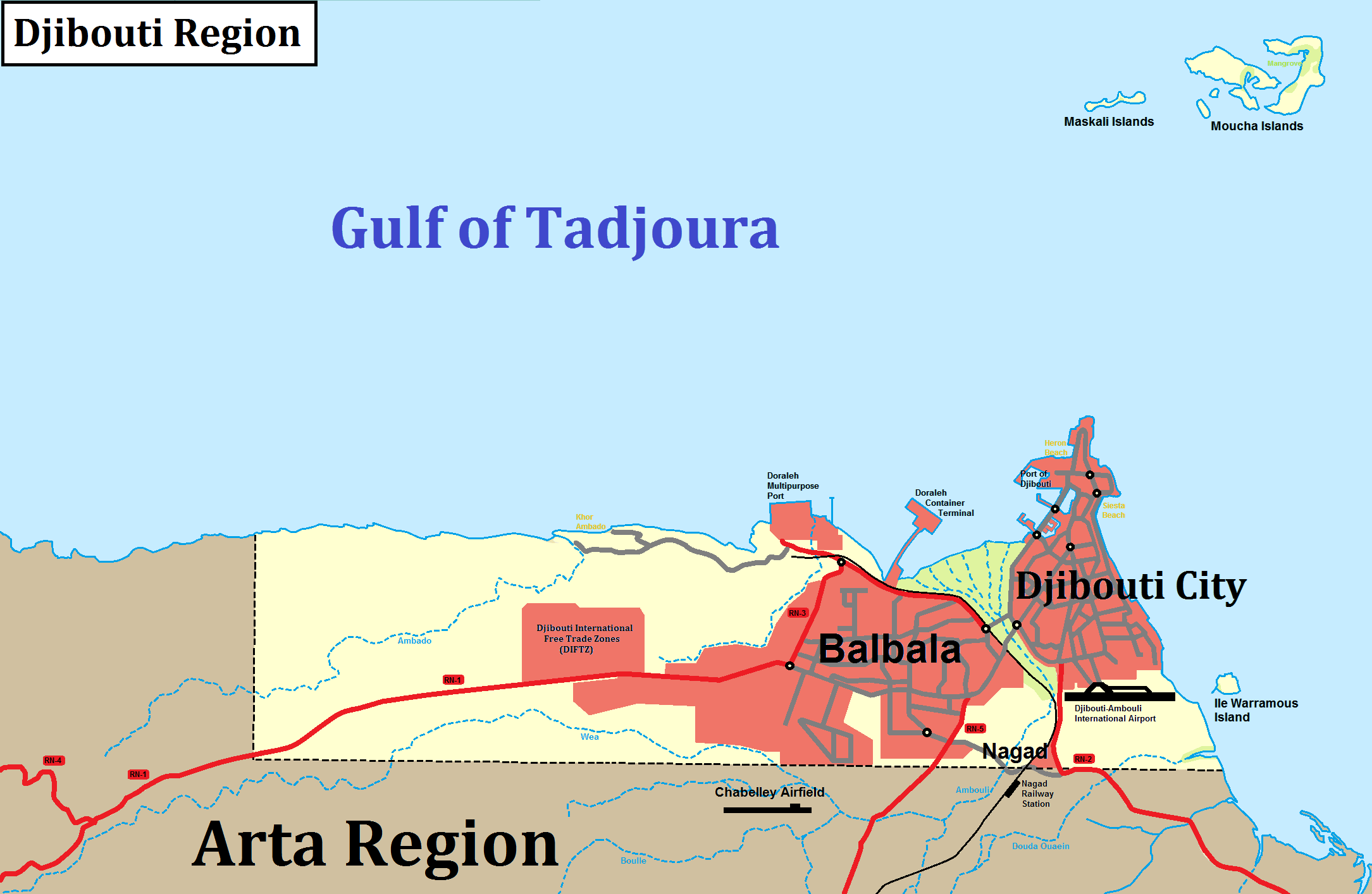
Map of Djibouti Region.

Djibouti Region has an Semi-arid climate. It is characterised by very hot rainless summers and a very warm, slightly wetter winter season. Most of the annual precipitation falls between October and May. In Djibouti City sees on average 163.5 millimetres (6.44 in) of rainfall per year. Average high temperatures range from 29 °C (84 °F) during the months of December, January and February, to about 42 °C (108 °F) in July. The topography of the region has coastal plain, there are two seasons: a hot dry season from May to October and a cooler season with more precipitation from November to April (winter). The rainfall on the coast usually occurs between November and March, whereas further inland it falls between April and October. In the summer months, temperatures routinely exceed 40 °C (104 °F), with relative humidity at its lowest point of the year. It is lowest during the rainy period, when there is some coastal fog and greater cloud coverage as warm air passes over the cool sea surface. However, precipitation is highly variable and long periods without any rainfall occur throughout the year. Unusual episodes of heavy rain sometimes occur, with a maximal 224 millimetres (8.82 in) falling in November 1949.
