= Djibouti City =

Capital and largest city in Djibouti

Djibouti City مدينة جيبوتي (Arabic) Ville de Djibouti (French) Magaalada Jabuuti (Somali) Gabuutî Magaala (Afar)
- Capital city
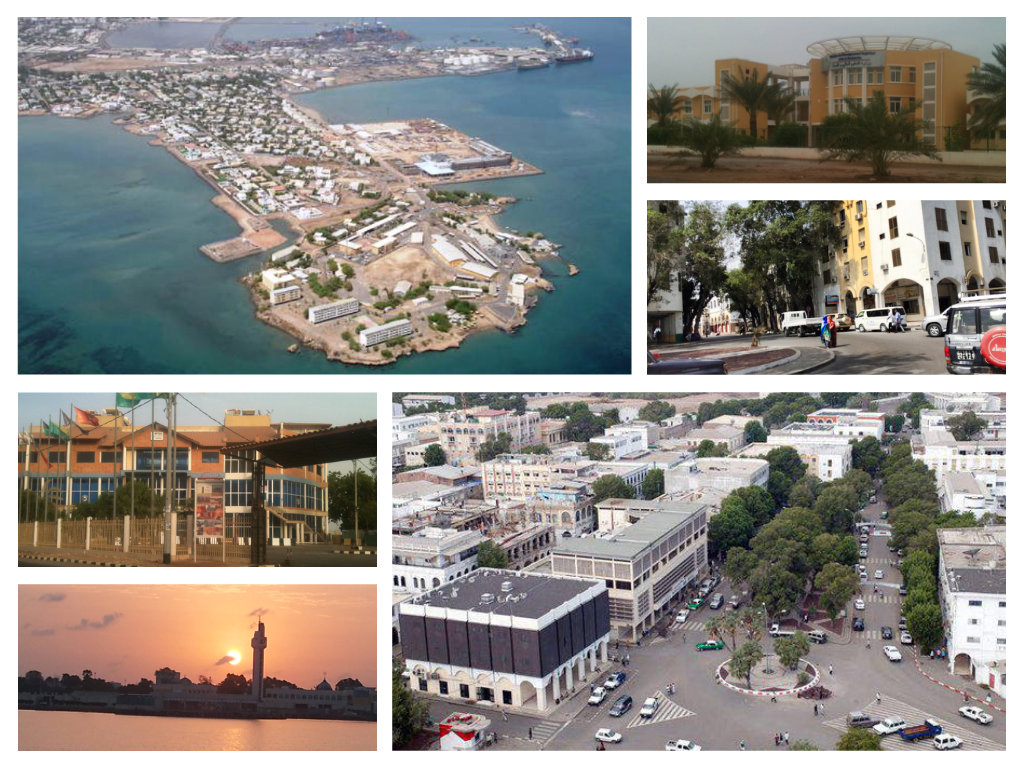
- Heron and port, MES-CERD, Rue Marchand, Hotel Casino Impérial, Sunrise near Venise road, Place Marchand

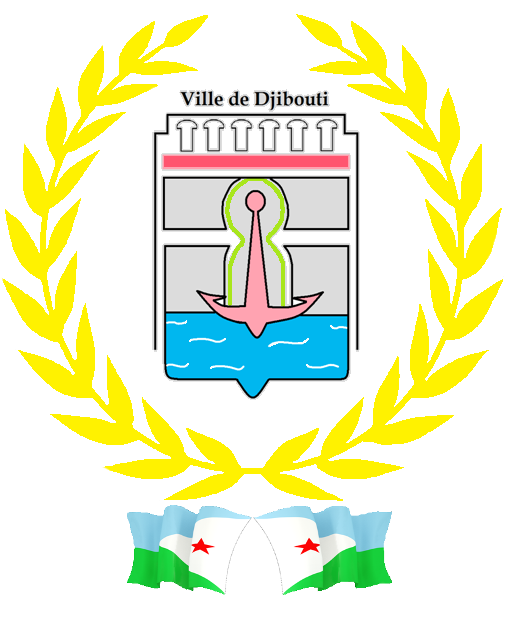
- Seal
- Nickname: Pearl of the Gulf of Tadjoura
- Interactive map of Djibouti City
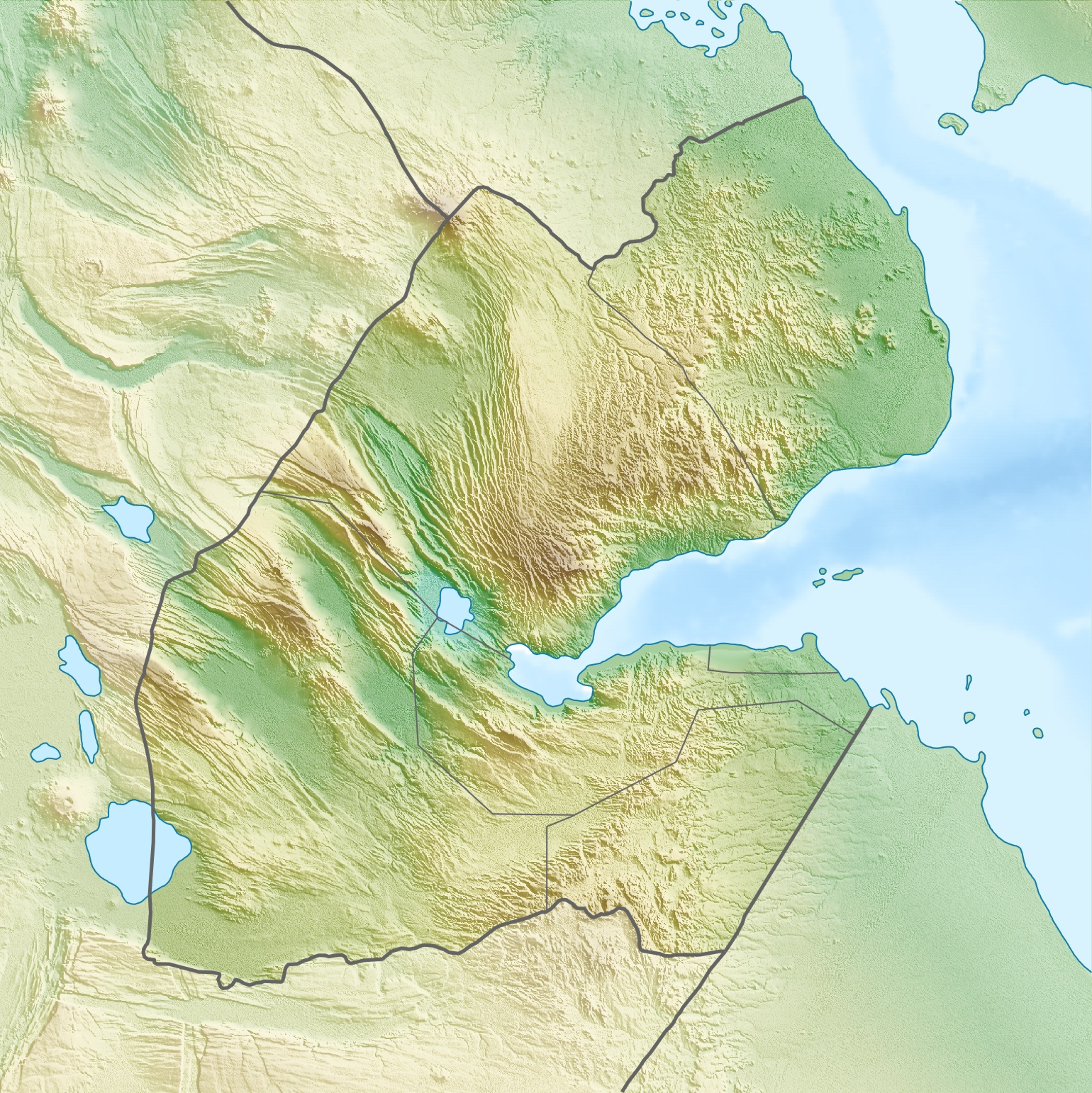
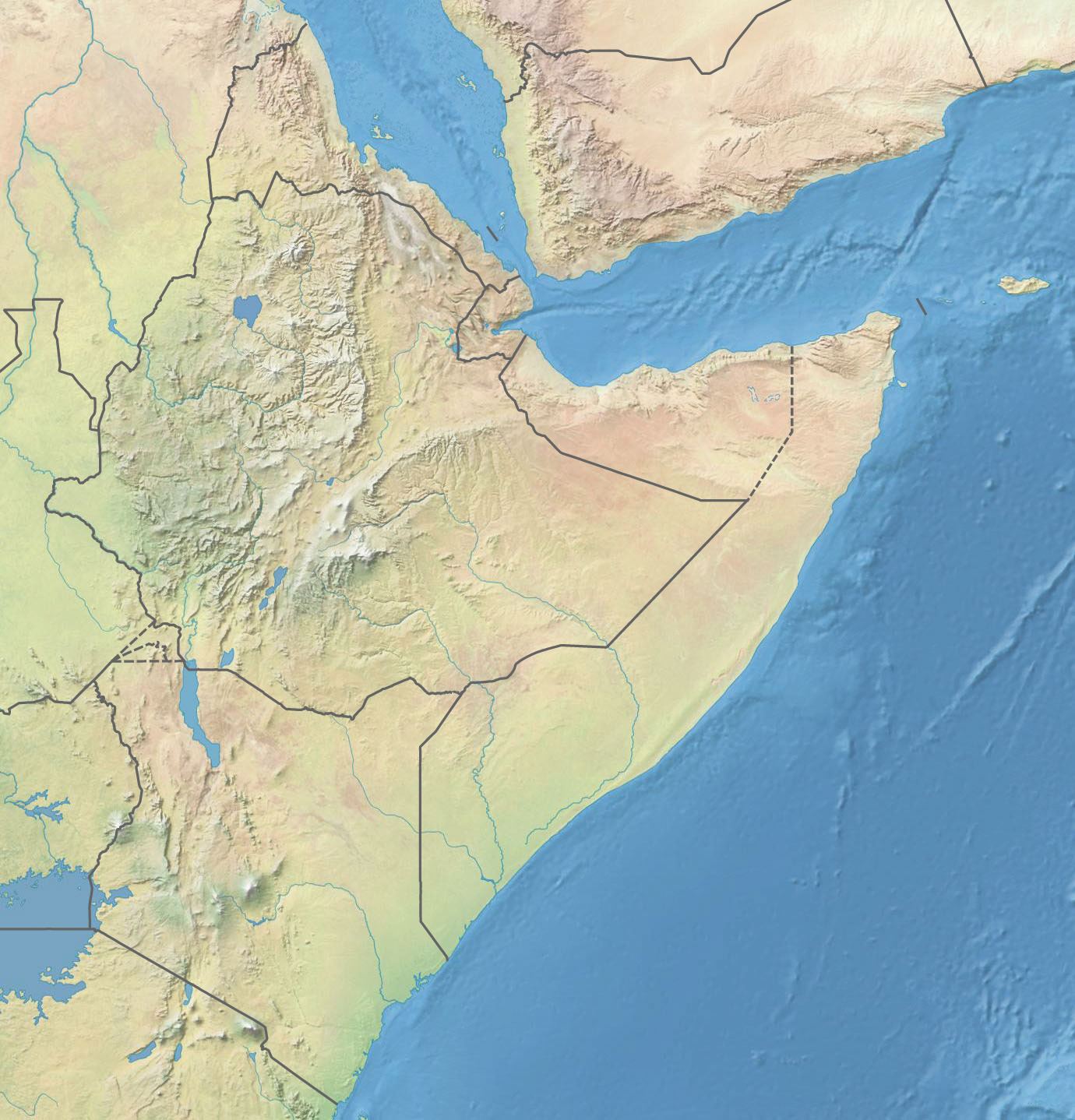
- Location within Djibouti Location within Horn of Africa Location within Africa
- Coordinates: 11°35′40″N 43°08′53″E
- Country: Djibouti
- Region: Djibouti Region
- Founded: 1888
- Sub-prefectures: 35

Government
  - Mayor of Djibouti: Said Daoud

Area
  - Total: 200 km^{2} (77 sq mi)
- Elevation: 14 m (46 ft)

Population (2024 census)
  - Total: 776,966
  - Rank: 1st
  - Density: 3,900/km^{2} (10,000/sq mi)
- Time zone: UTC+03:00 (EAT)
- Area code: +253
- ISO 3166 code: DJ-DJ
- HDI (2018): ▲0.549 low

Djibouti City (also called Djibouti and Jibuti in early Western texts) (Note: Arabic: مدينة جيبوتي; French: Ville de Djibouti; Somali: Magaalada Jabuuti; Afar: Gabuutî Magaala) is the capital and largest city of the Republic of Djibouti. It is located in the coastal Djibouti Region on the Gulf of Tadjoura.

Djibouti has a population of around 780,000 inhabitants, which accounts for 73% of the country's population. The settlement was founded in 1888 by the French, on land leased from the ruling Somali and Afar Sultans. During the ensuing period, it served as the capital of French Somaliland and its successor the French Territory of the Afars and Issas.

== History ==
There is evidence of human settlement on the eastern coastline of Djibouti dating back to the Bronze Age.

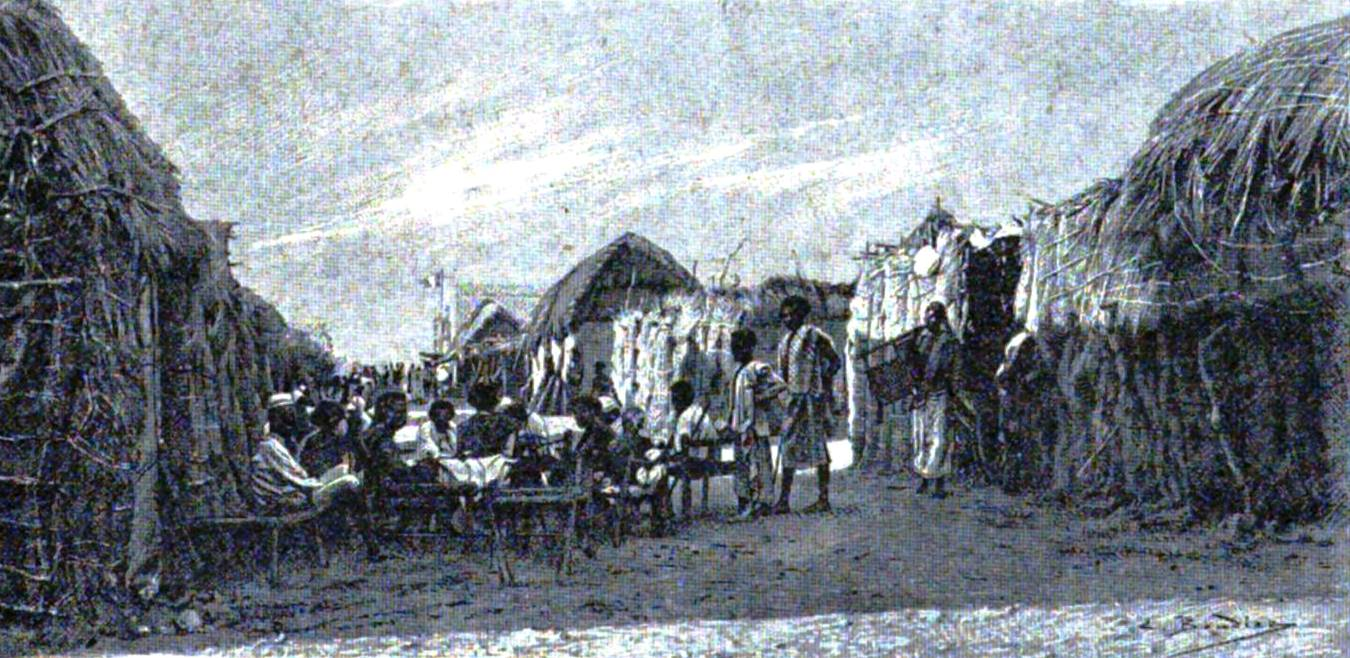
Djibouti City in 1895

From 1862 until 1894, the land to the north of the Gulf of Tadjoura was called Obock and was ruled by Issa and Afar Sultans, local authorities with whom France signed various treaties between 1883 and 1887 to first gain a foothold in the region. The exchange of Franco-British diplomatic notes of 2 and 9 February 1888 fixed the territorial limit between the colonies of the two countries; leaving explicitly under French authority the southern coasts of the Gulf of Tadjoura, including a peninsula composed of insubmersible plateaux, Ras Djibouti as a highly strategic location, a future bridgehead for French designs in the rest of Africa and Asia. It is then that this point begins to be used as departure for caravans towards Harar.

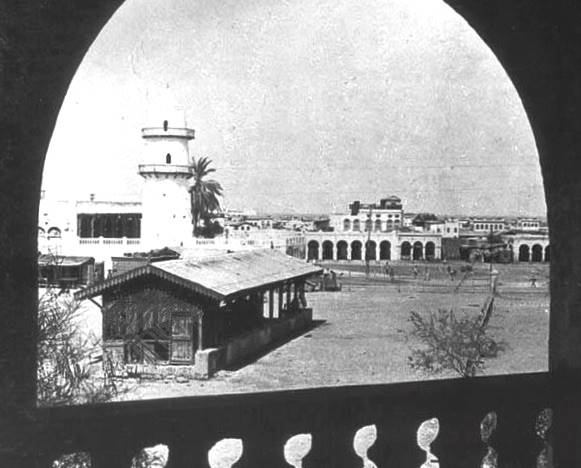
Djibouti in 1902

The French subsequently founded Djibouti in 1888, in a previously uninhabited stretch of coast. According to one account, this was due to "its superiority to Obok both in respect to harbour accommodation and in nearness to Harrar." Ambouli was a small village before the French arrived, about 3 kilometres (1.9 mi) south of Ras Djiboutil. Ambouli is identified with the city of Canbala by O.G.S. Crawford, appearing in Muhammad al-Idrisi's map of 1192 on the coast of the Horn of Africa, southeast of the straits of Bab-el-Mandeb, and with Cambaleh, a town where the Venetian traveler Bragadino, a thirteenth-century European visitor to Ethiopia, resided for eight years. In 1896, the settlement was made the capital of French Somaliland. The main purpose of the French interest in colonizing the region was to protect their trade routes to Madagascar and Indochina from the encroachment of other European powers. The town later grew considerably in size following the construction of the Franco-Ethiopian Railway. In 1895, Djibouti, which, not so long ago, was just a peninsula, already had 5,000 inhabitants. Many Issa and Afar nomads left their herds to settle here, built houses on what is now the downtown area. They became dockers and constitute the first local proletariat. The French and natives built hotels, houses, mosques and churches. The Yemeni, Egyptian, Greek, Armenian and Italian merchants and traders flocked to this promise that Djibouti represented. Additionally, the rich agricultural southern area of Ambouli continued to flourish due to an abundance of date palm farms and orchards. Djibouti did not attract as many boats as Aden. In 1896, Léonce Lagarde became the first governor of the French Somali Coast, a new name for the French dependencies in the region. At the start of the 20th century, Djibouti had 10,000 inhabitants and was considered a major regional port. Its main activity remains the supply of French ships en route to Indochina or Madagascar. Only 150,000 tonnes of freight per year were handled. In addition, the railway line has not yet been fully exploited.

Although the initial French efforts to establish commercial influence in the region proved to be unsuccessful enough to require a government bailout, the Franco-Ethiopian Railway itself was a success and allowed Djibouti's commerce to quickly eclipse the former caravan-based trade carried on with nearby Zeila in British Somaliland. Djibouti became the center of exports from southern Ethiopia and the Ogaden, including trade in Harari coffee and khat. Djibouti began to develop as a commercial center. On 12 July 1926, the Fontainebleau, a Messageries Maritimes steamer loaded with cotton and heading for China caught fire while approaching Djibouti. The captain decided to flood the holds and run aground his ship in the middle of the harbor of Djibouti, causing significant inconvenience for port traffic. The city then proposed using the wreck as a promontory of a new deep-water port, connecting it to the Marabout plateau by a 700-meter jetty. The idea was accepted and work began in 1931. The first phase was completed in 1935 and considerably increased port and rail traffic. In 1933, Djibouti was the first town to be wired to electricity in French Somaliland, and an oil terminal was built in 1937.

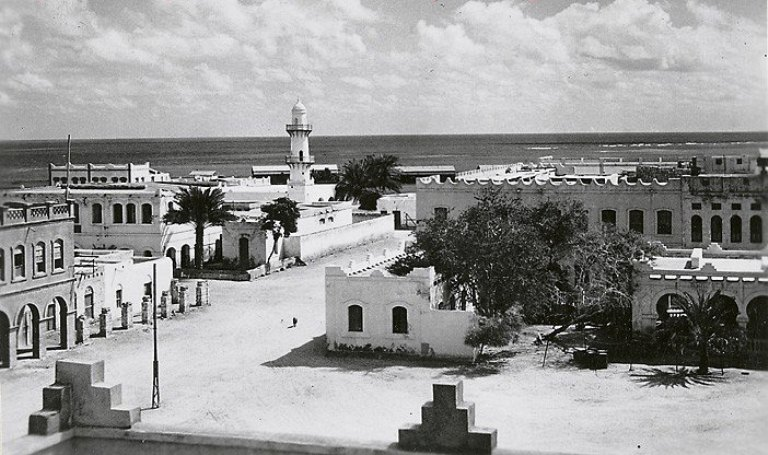
The Al Sada Mosque in the 1940s

During the Second World War, Djibouti was hit by Italian airstrikes on 21 June 1940, which killed many people in the town. The anti-aircraft fire was intense and two Italian aircraft failed to return, but fires and explosions were seen in Djibouti. Overnight, several waves of Savoia-Marchetti SM.81 bombers attacked the port facilities. After the defeat of France the colony came under the control of the pro-Axis Vichy government. By that time, the Allied offensive against the Italians included a blockade of French Somaliland. On 25 September the RAF launched several airstrikes on the city, prompting governor Pierre Nouailhetas to institute a brutal reign of terror against Europeans and African inhabitants of the city. Famine set in and malnutrition-related diseases took many lives, 70% of them women and children, and many townsfolk left for the hinterland. The locals named the blockade the carmii, a word for a type of sorghum usually reserved for cattle, but used as human food at the height of the famine. The head doctor at the hospital committed suicide in despair. Only a few Arab dhows (boutres) managed to run the blockade to Djibouti and Obock and only two French ships from Madagascar managed to run it.

The Japanese declaration of war (7 December 1941) gave the colony some respite, since the Royal Navy were forced to withdraw all but two ships from the blockade to be used in the Far East. The rule of Nouailhetas was too brutal for even the authoritarian leaders at Vichy to stand for. In October 1942 he was recalled and forced to retire without a pension, Following the war, he escaped to Portugal. He returned to face a military tribunal and was acquitted on 17 July 1953, which sparked outrage in Djibouti.

The Commander-in-Chief, East Africa, William Platt, codenamed the negotiations for the surrender of French Somaliland "Pentagon", because there were five sides: himself, the Vichy governor, the Free French, the British minister at Addis Ababa and the United States. Christian Raimond Dupont, the governor of French Somaliland, surrendered and Colonel Raynal's troops crossed back into French Somaliland on 26 December 1942, completing its liberation. The official handover took place at 10:00 p.m. on 28 December. The first governor appointed under the Free French was André Bayardelle.

In 1946, Djibouti received the status of overseas territory. An elected territorial assembly was created then, in 1956, a government council charged, under the chairmanship of the head of the territory, with the management of local affairs. At the same time, fiscal, customs and monetary measures are put in place to promote the development of the deep-water port, to finally compete with Aden. Port facilities expanded considerably and could afford to accommodate 2,000 ships per year. Djibouti becomes a free port and abandons the free zone. In 1948, a new currency, the Côte Française des Somalis, was created, pegged to the gold standard and convertible into dollars.

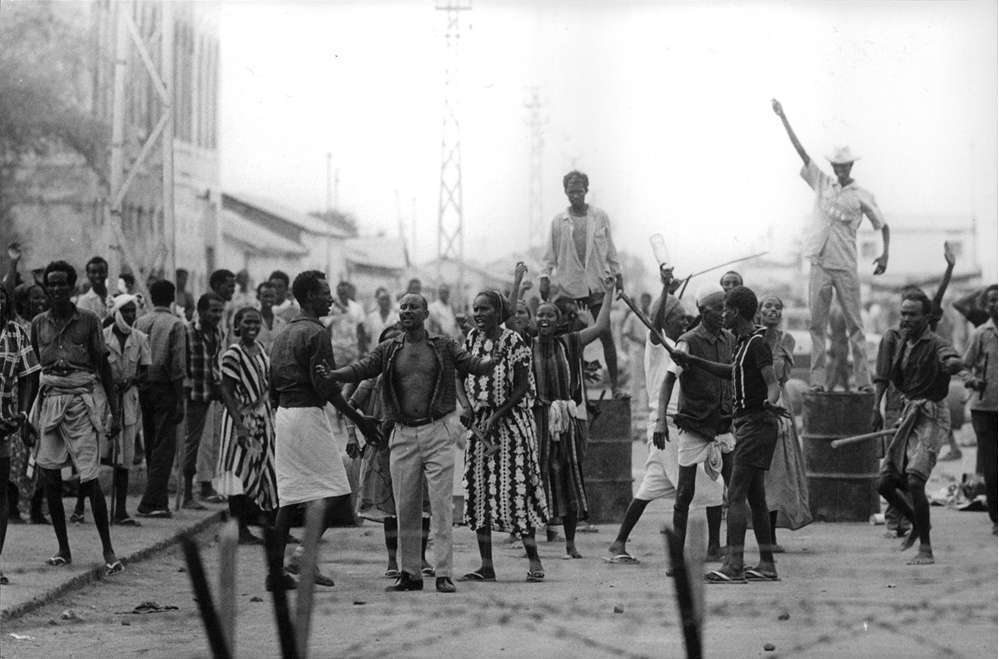
Post-referendum demonstrations on 23 March 1967

In August 1966, an official visit to the territory by then French President, General Charles de Gaulle, was also met with demonstrations and rioting. In response to the protests, de Gaulle ordered another referendum. On 19 March 1967, a second plebiscite was held to determine the fate of the territory. Initial results supported a continued but looser relationship with France. However, the referendum was again marred by reports of vote rigging on the part of the French authorities, voters rejected independence by a 50-point margin. Announcement of the plebiscite results sparked civil unrest, including several deaths.

The population of Djibouti was growing rapidly, from officially about 17,000 inhabitants in 1947. In 1949, the plan of Djibouti consisted of four main features: a hierarchical system of streets laid out in a grid, large blocks consisting of small-scale domestic dwellings, the organization of these blocks around central open spaces, and the concentration of cultural institutions to form a civic center. It then became the headquarters of the succeeding French Territory of the Afars and Issas.

When Djibouti declared Independence on 27 June 1977, the population of Djibouti was over 110,000, the city has since served as the administrative and commercial capital of the Republic of Djibouti.

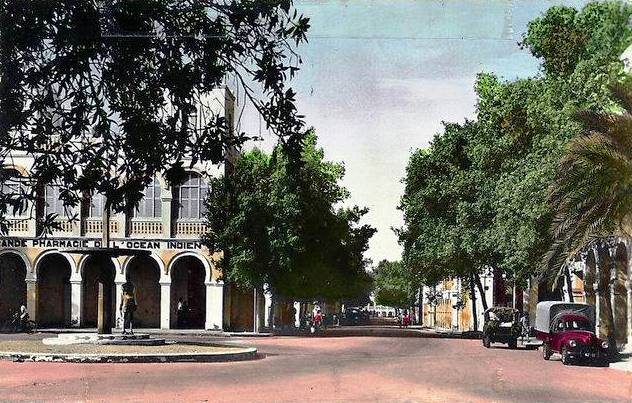
The Place 27 June in the 1970s

== Climate ==
Djibouti has an arid climate (Köppen: BWh). It is characterised by very hot rainless summers and a very warm, slightly wetter winter season. Most of the annual precipitation falls between October and May. The city sees on average 163.5 millimetres (6.44 in) of rainfall per year. Average high temperatures range from 29 °C (84 °F) during the months of December, January and February, to about 42 °C (108 °F) in July. There are two seasons: a hot dry season from May to October and a cooler season with more precipitation from November to April (winter). The rainfall on the coast usually occurs between November and March, whereas further inland it falls between April and October. In the summer months, temperatures routinely exceed 40 °C (104 °F), with relative humidity at its lowest point of the year. Sunshine is abundant in the city, averaging eight to ten hours a day year-round. It is lowest during the rainy period, when there is some coastal fog and greater cloud coverage as warm air passes over the cool sea surface. However, precipitation is highly variable and long periods without any rainfall occur throughout the year. Unusual episodes of heavy rain sometimes occur, with a maximal 224 millimetres (8.82 in) falling in November 1949.

This climate zone has summers that reach a maximum temperature of 42.1 °C (107.8 °F) and a minimum temperature of 31 °C (88 °F). Winters have average nighttime temperatures of 22 °C (72 °F) and a daytime maximum temperatures of 29 °C (84 °F). There are barely any days in the year without sunshine, and even during the winter there are many clear days.

Climate data for Djibouti (1991–2020)
Month	Jan	Feb	Mar	Apr	May	Jun	Jul	Aug	Sep	Oct	Nov	Dec	Year
Record high °C (°F)	32.1 (89.8)	32.6 (90.7)	36.1 (97.0)	36.4 (97.5)	44.5 (112.1)	45.9 (114.6)	45.9 (114.6)	45.8 (114.4)	43.6 (110.5)	38.3 (100.9)	34.8 (94.6)	32.6 (90.7)	45.9 (114.6)
Mean daily maximum °C (°F)	29.2 (84.6)	29.4 (84.9)	30.7 (87.3)	32.5 (90.5)	35.3 (95.5)	39.5 (103.1)	42.1 (107.8)	41.5 (106.7)	38.0 (100.4)	33.7 (92.7)	31.2 (88.2)	29.7 (85.5)	34.4 (93.9)
Daily mean °C (°F)	25.1 (77.2)	25.7 (78.3)	27.0 (80.6)	28.7 (83.7)	31.0 (87.8)	34.2 (93.6)	36.4 (97.5)	36.0 (96.8)	33.1 (91.6)	29.3 (84.7)	26.9 (80.4)	25.4 (77.7)	29.9 (85.8)
Mean daily minimum °C (°F)	21.8 (71.2)	22.4 (72.3)	23.9 (75.0)	25.4 (77.7)	27.5 (81.5)	30.2 (86.4)	31.4 (88.5)	30.9 (87.6)	29.5 (85.1)	25.5 (77.9)	23.3 (73.9)	22.2 (72.0)	26.2 (79.2)
Record low °C (°F)	16.0 (60.8)	16.2 (61.2)	17.0 (62.6)	18.5 (65.3)	19.8 (67.6)	24.0 (75.2)	23.3 (73.9)	24.1 (75.4)	23.1 (73.6)	17.2 (63.0)	17.8 (64.0)	16.8 (62.2)	16.0 (60.8)
Average rainfall mm (inches)	14.1 (0.56)	12.2 (0.48)	13.7 (0.54)	28.5 (1.12)	16.1 (0.63)	1.5 (0.06)	6.3 (0.25)	5.7 (0.22)	10.2 (0.40)	11.4 (0.45)	22.4 (0.88)	15.2 (0.60)	157.3 (6.19)
Average rainy days (≥ 1.0 mm)	1.3	1.1	1.0	1.6	0.5	0.0	0.0	0.4	0.8	0.9	1.8	1.0	10.4
Average relative humidity (%)	74	73	73	75	69	56	44	48	62	68	71	73	65.5
Mean monthly sunshine hours	245	222	260	263	301	281	259	269	271	296	269	254	3,190
Source 1: Hong Kong Observatory (temperature and rainfall), NOAA (sunshine and records)
Source 2: Deutscher Wetterdienst (rainy days 1968–1986, humidity 1953–1970)

Climate data for Djibouti
Month	Jan	Feb	Mar	Apr	May	Jun	Jul	Aug	Sep	Oct	Nov	Dec	Year
Average sea temperature °C (°F)	26.0 (79.0)	26.0 (79.0)	27.0 (81.0)	28.0 (82.0)	30.0 (86.0)	31.0 (88.0)	30.0 (86.0)	29.0 (84.0)	30.0 (86.0)	30.0 (86.0)	28.0 (82.0)	27.0 (81.0)	28.5 (83.3)
Mean daily daylight hours	12.0	12.0	12.0	12.0	13.0	13.0	13.0	12.0	12.0	12.0	12.0	11.0	12.2
Average Ultraviolet index	10	11+	11+	11+	11+	11+	11+	11+	11+	11	10	9	10.7
Source: Weather Atlas

== Demographics ==
Foreign-born populations
Country of birth	Population (2015)
Somalia	55,645
Ethiopia	44,821
Yemen	35,900
Oman	30,900
France	7,112
United States	715
India	691

Historical population
Year	Pop.	±%
1916	17,981	—
1930	22,046	+22.6%
1940	27,987	+26.9%
1950	35,564	+27.1%
1960	39,962	+12.4%
1965	50,071	+25.3%
1970	70,100	+40.0%
1977	110,248	+57.3%
1982	149,316	+35.4%
1987	230,891	+54.6%
1992	279,912	+21.2%
1999	312,447	+11.6%
2003	379,353	+21.4%
2009	475,322	+25.3%
2024	776,966	+63.5%

Djibouti is a multi-ethnic town. It had a population of around 777,000 residents (including suburbs like Balbala) in 2024, making it by far the largest settlement in the country. The largest ethnic group are the Somali and the second largest being Afars, both Cushitic speaking Cushitic peoples. The population of Djibouti City has risen exponentially with the successive waves of immigrants and refugees arriving throughout the 20th century. Many of the immigrants arrived from Ethiopia and Somalia in 1985 and 1991. In 2001 many undocumented immigrants, were expelled from Djibouti. Another mass wave of Yemeni refugees from Yemen arrived in 2015. Djibouti City was nicknamed the "French Hong Kong in the Red Sea" due to its cosmopolitan urbanism. In 2023, the government of Djibouti launched a major campaign to combat illegal immigration, citing security and public health concerns.

The majority of local residents speak Somali (303,100 speakers) or Afar (101,200 speakers) as a first language, which are the mother tongues of the Somali and Afar ethnic groups, respectively and the two main demographic groups in the city. Both languages belong to the larger Afroasiatic family. There are two official languages in Djibouti: Arabic (Afroasiatic) and French (Indo-European).

Arabic is of social, cultural and religious importance. In formal settings, it consists of Modern Standard Arabic. Colloquially, about 40,000 local residents speak the Ta'izzi-Adeni Arabic dialect, also known as Southern Yemeni Arabic due to Yemeni immigrants. French was inherited from the colonial period and is the primary language of instruction. About 14,200 Djiboutians speak it as a first language. Immigrant languages include Omani Arabic (38,900 speakers) and Amharic (1,400 speakers).

Djibouti's population is predominantly Muslim. Islam is observed by 94% of the nation's population (around 740,000 as of 2012), whereas the remaining 6% of residents are Christian adherents. The Diocese of Djibouti serves the small local Catholic population, which it estimates numbered around 7,000 individuals in 2006.

=== Religion ===
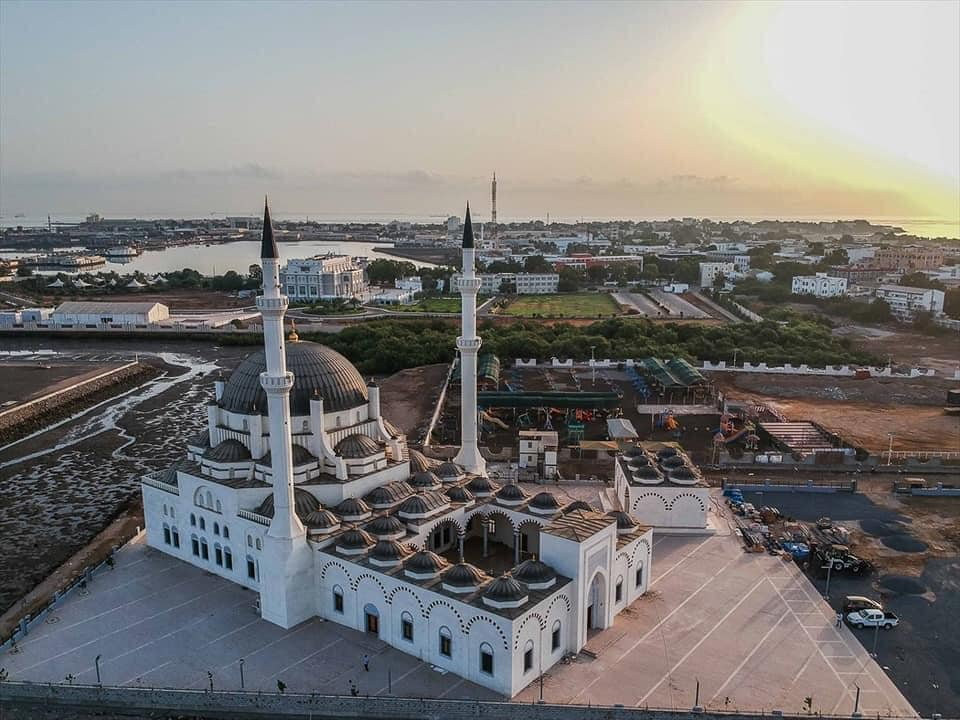
Masjid Abdülhamid II in Jibuti City.

Among the places of worship, they are predominantly Muslim mosques. There are also Christian churches and temples: Ethiopian Orthodox Tewahedo Church, Roman Catholic Diocese of Djibouti (Catholic Church), Protestant churches, Evangelical Churches.

== Administration ==
The National Assembly of Djibouti in the centre of Djibouti

Djibouti has the distinction of being both a city and an administrative province. The Djibouti Region is one of the six regions of Djibouti. It borders the Gulf of Tadjoura and Gulf of Aden to the north and east, and the Arta Region to the south and west. The Djibouti Region is the smallest province in the country, but contains the national capital, Djibouti, and thus is the region with the greatest population of people. Djibouti Region occupies an area of 200 square kilometres (77 square miles).

=== Local government ===
The administration of Djibouti City is formed of three municipalities: The commune of Ras-Dika, commune of Boulaos and commune of Balbala. The Djibouti City Council elected members headed by the mayor, who serves a five-year term and appoints deputies. The mayor of Djibouti City, who has executive powers, and the National Assembly, which scrutinises the mayor's decisions and can accept or reject the mayor's budget proposals each year, are responsible for most local services, such as local planning, schools, social services, local roads and refuse collection. Certain functions, such as waste management, are provided through joint arrangements.

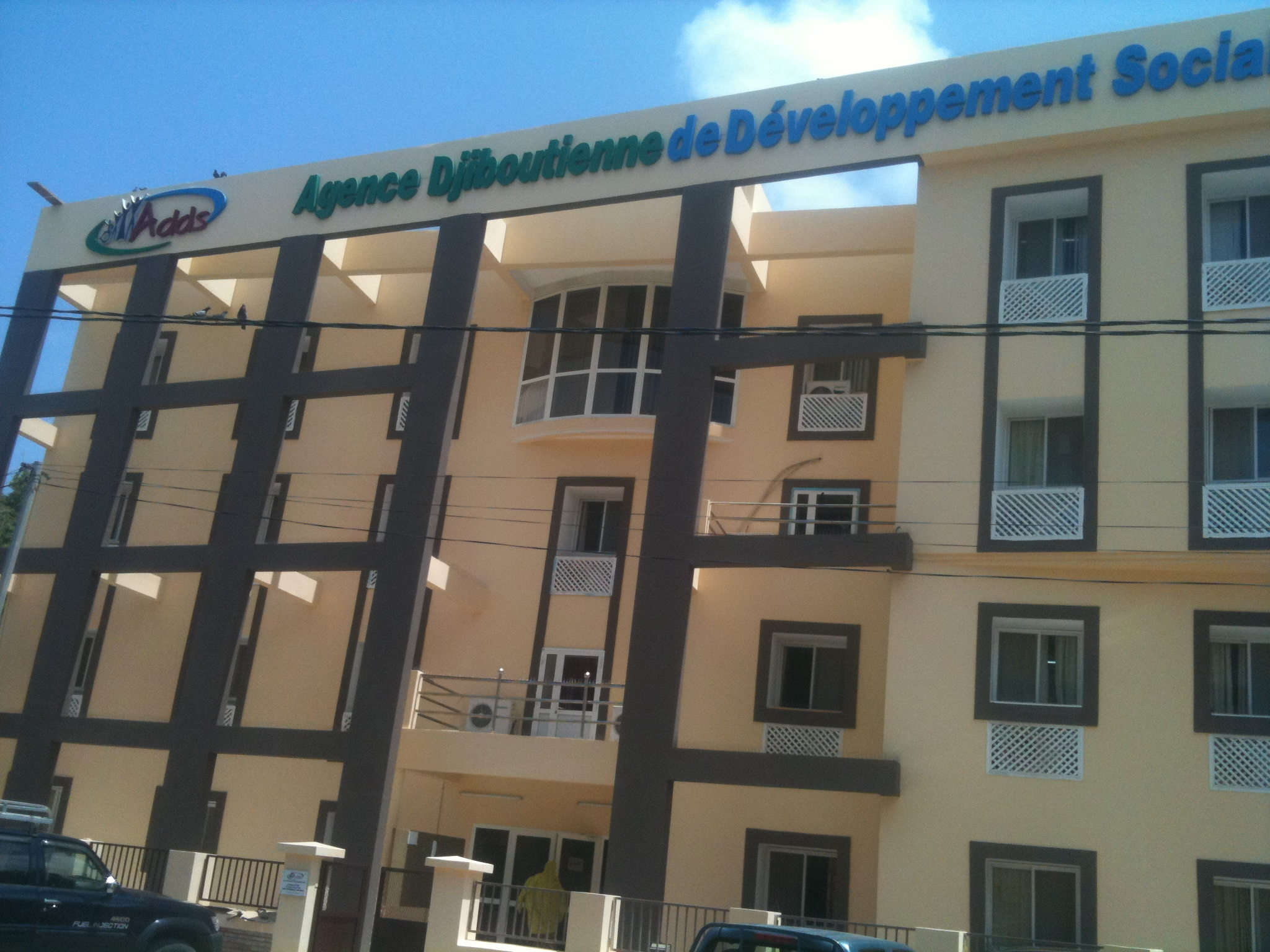
Headquarters of the Social Development Agency of Djibouti

=== National government ===
Djibouti City is the seat of the Government of Djibouti. Many government departments, as well as the President's residence at the presidential palace are based. The National Assembly (formerly the Chamber of Deputies) is the country's legislature consisting of 65 members elected every five years. Although unicameral, the Constitution provides for the creation of a senate. The Social Development Agency of Djibouti (Agence de Développement Sociale de Djibouti) has its head offices here, as does the Intergovernmental Authority on Development (IGAD) trade bloc. Additionally, the Regional Somali Language Academy, a language regulator established in June 2013 by the governments of Djibouti, Somalia and Ethiopia, has its headquarters in the city.

== Architecture ==
The architecture of Djibouti reflects the city's history since the early 1890s and is marked by both native Djiboutians, Yemeni, French and modern buildings. The old section is filled with bazaars and souks nestled along narrow streets. Djibouti City has wide streets, restaurants, Plaza (town squares) and cafes while many of the boulevards are lined with trees. It is serves as both a center for commerce and entertainment, as well as a residential area. To accommodate the growing middle class, many new apartments and housing developments are being constructed in and around the city. A few of the building fronts have been renovated and date back to the 19th century. The Place of 27 June in the city center is also distinguished by its Moorish-inspired arches. Due to its numerous exotic edifices and structures, the city has also been likened to a European settlement. Since independence, the people of Djibouti have introduced new infrastructure and technology, which has led to new and innovative building concepts, ideas and construction techniques. Notable taller architecture in Djibouti City includes the Mezz Tower, SALAAM Tower and East Africa Bank. Djibouti City is the headquarters of the Intergovernmental Authority on Development (IGAD).

== Main sights ==
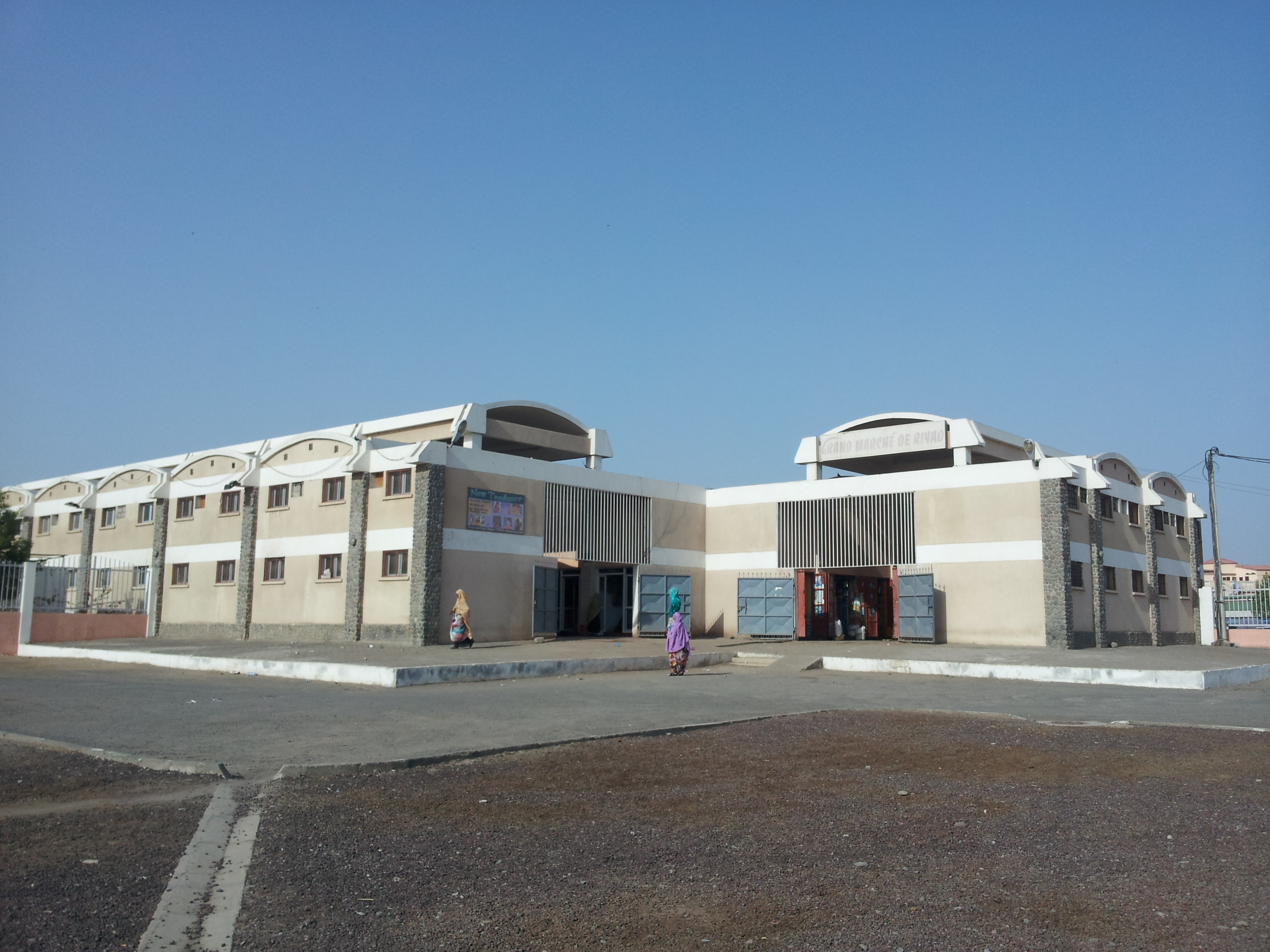
Ryad Market in the heart of Djibouti

=== Museums, libraries and theatres ===
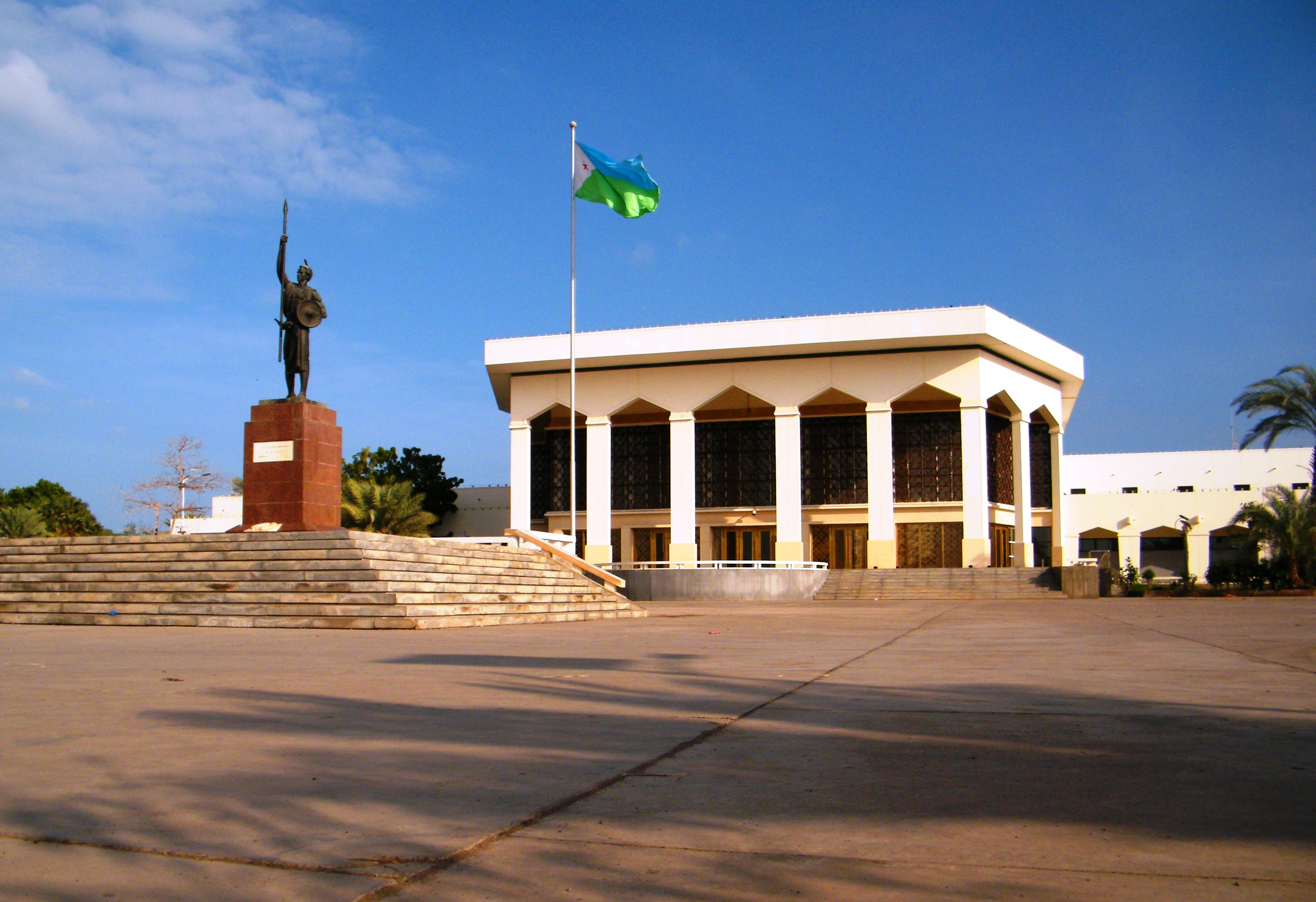
People's Palace on Boulevard Bounhour

The Théâtre des Salines opened in 1965 as an important cultural landmark in the national capital. Open-air, in the form of an arena; with concrete bleachers, the Théâtre des Salines is a mythical place for Djiboutians who were born before the country's independence. Indeed, this place has hosted many shows for several decades (plays, concerts, one man show etc...).

The National Archives and Library of Djibouti hosts many artifacts and artistic treasures in Djibouti, it holds many culturally important artefacts, including old coins, bartering tools, traditional artwork, ancient weaponry and pottery items.

=== Palaces ===
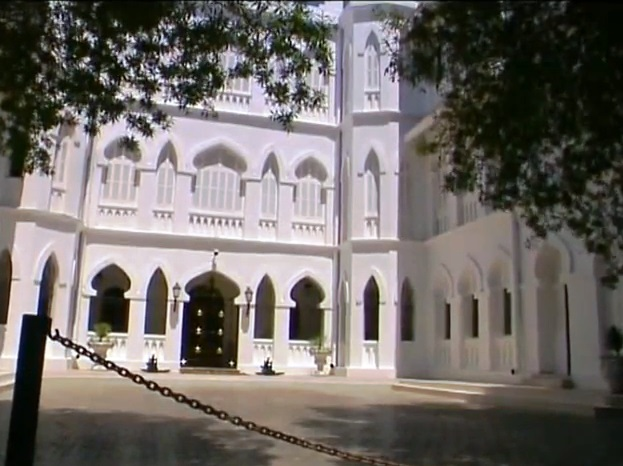
The presidential palace in Djibouti

The presidential palace is the official residence and principal workplace of the President of Djibouti. It overlooks the Gulf of Tadjoura, with access to both the harbour and airport. The Governor's Palace of Djibouti was the seat of the governor of French Somaliland and French Territory of the Afars and the Issas from 1884 to 1977.

=== Institutes ===
The Regional Somali Language Academy is an intergovernmental regulating body for the Somali language in the Horn region. On 28 June 2013, the Government of Djibouti, the Federal Government of Somalia and the Government of Ethiopia launched the Regional Somali Language Academy at a ceremony in Djibouti City. The event was organized by Djibouti's Ministry of Islamic Affairs, Culture and Waqf in conjunction with the Somali-Speaking PEN Centre of Djibouti, and was attended by around 50 prominent Somali-speaking intellectuals from the region and elsewhere. Among the guests were Somalia's Minister of Information, Posts and Telecommunications Abdullahi Elmoge Hersi, Somaliland's Minister of Culture Abiib Diriye Nur, and the Vice President of the Somali Region of Ethiopia Abdihakim Igal Omar.

=== Parks ===
Djibouti has several public parks. The largest of these is the Lagarde Park.

== Economy ==
Djibouti City economy, like that of Djibouti, is dominated by trade, most local businesses have their headquarters in the city. Djibouti Telecom, the largest telecommunications company in the country, is based here. During its existence, Djibouti Airlines also had its head office in the city. Djibouti City is the financial hub to many entrepreneurial industries ranging from construction, retail, import and export, money transfer companies, and Internet cafés.

Djibouti City main trading ports, is a trading hub linking Europe, the Far East, the Horn of Africa and the Persian Gulf. An estimated 2,500 ships pass through and call through the port every day. The Djibouti International Free Trade Zone (DIFTZ) is a special economic zone located to the west of the city, which is subject to different economic regulations. The city's port is the terminus for Ethiopian oil transport and export. Increase in railway infrastructure has further enabled Ethiopian and Eritrean oil products to reach the capital.

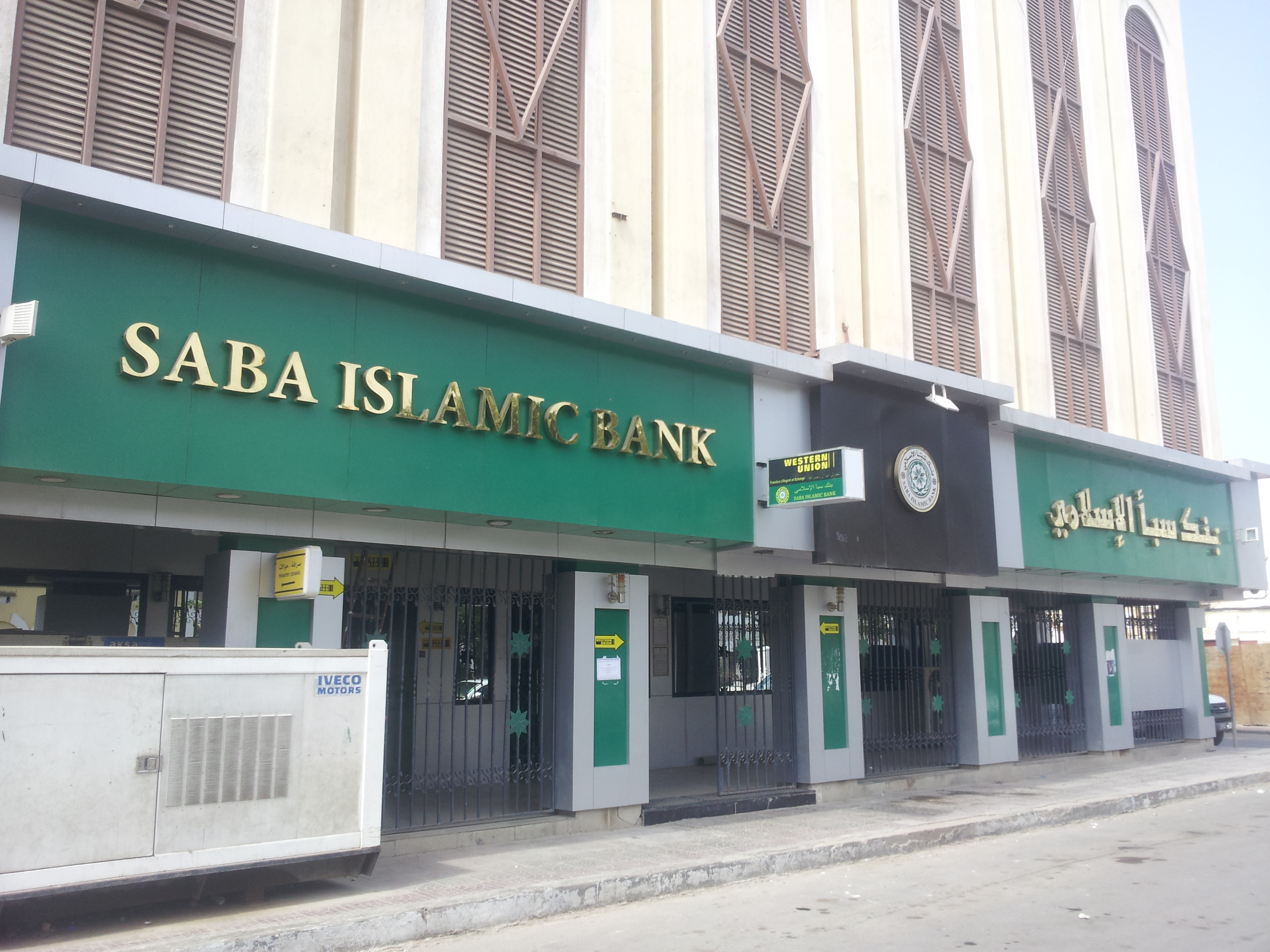
A Saba Islamic Bank branch in Djibouti

=== Banking ===
The banking sector is one of the principal foundations of Djibouti's economy. The financial sector of the Republic of Djibouti has grown dramatically in recent years, a process that began in the early 2000s, and that was in large part prompted by an explosion the number of exchange agencies and remittances throughout the country. The Djiboutian financial sector, with total assets of 265 billion DJF or 10.2 per cent of GDP, has not been affected by the international financial crisis. Djibouti has been considered an oasis of peace and a model of political stability in a region.

=== Tourism ===
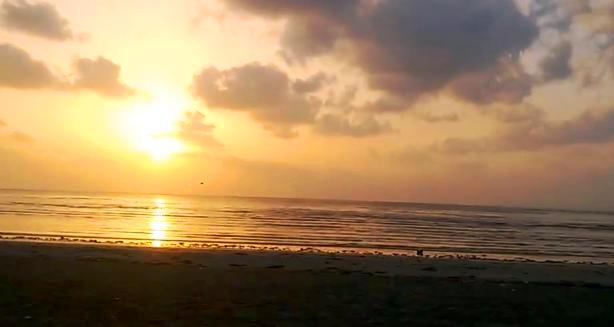
Siesta Beach at sunrise

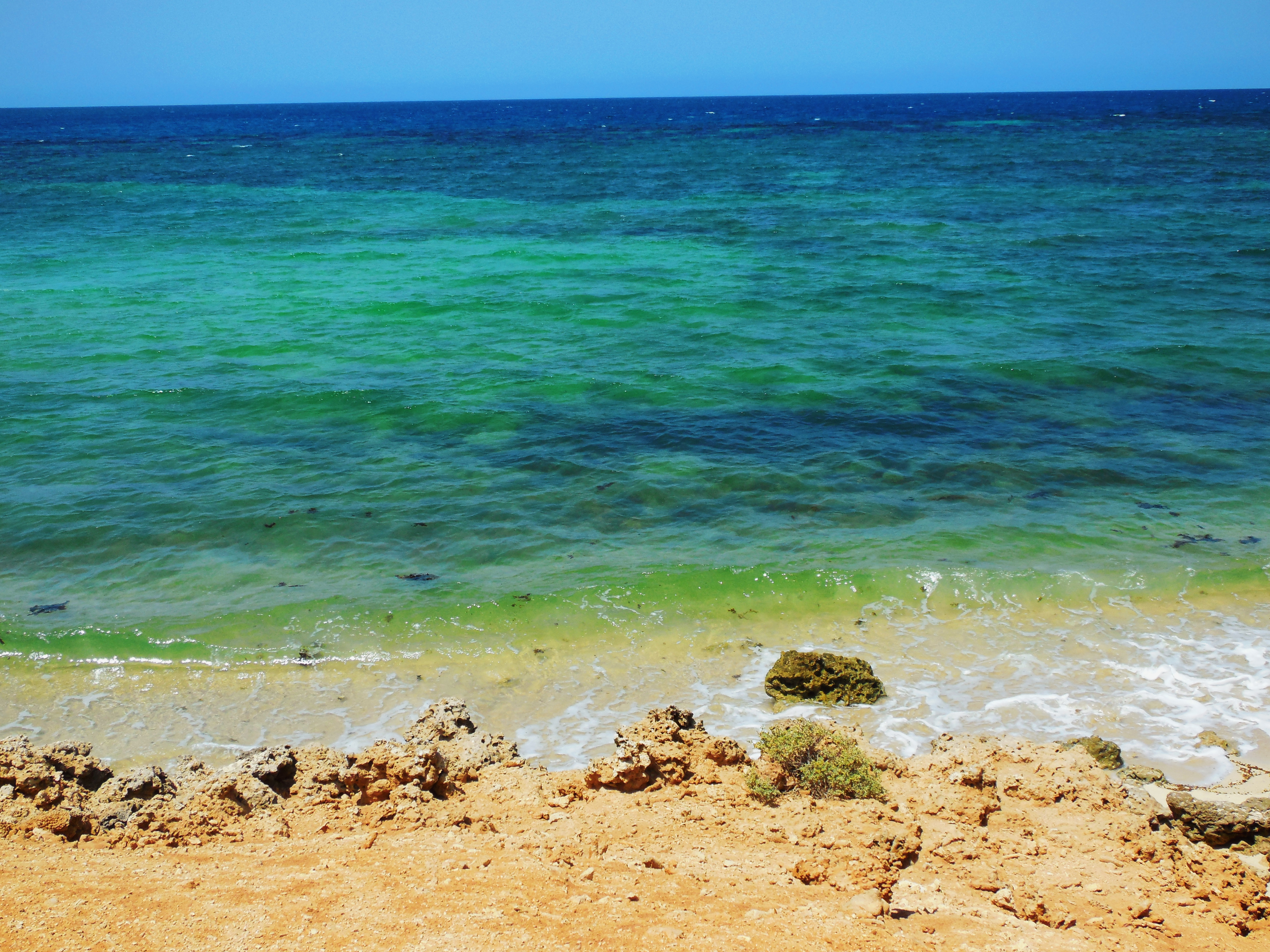
Beach south of Djibouti, overlooking the Gulf of Aden

Tourism in Djibouti is centred in the Djibouti region. City landmarks include historic buildings, two important public squares, and the Hall of the People. Many private companies offer organized tours of these sites.

The two small Maskali and Moucha islands are situated an hour's boat ride from Djibouti. They feature madreporic mangroves, with a rich seabed and colourful algae. Various fish species can also be found in the local coral gardens, including groupers, jacks and barracuda.

== Transport ==
=== Road ===
Minaret of Hamoudi Mosque overlooking Djibouti City's central bus terminal

Djibouti is a major transportation hub, served by a comprehensive public transport network. Roads leading out of the city connect it to other national localities and to Somalia and Ethiopia. Public transportation is provided through buses stationed at the Djibouti Bus Service Enterprise. The city at large serves as a point of intersection for the main roads and highways linking different parts of the country. It is one of the most accessible urban areas in the country, where one can find public and private transportation 24 hours a day and 7 days a week. A significant number of the city's residents use the local informal minibuses and taxis, which include a fleet of 400 green-and-white taxis. The main bus hub in Djibouti is the Central Bus Station, located at the crossing of Rue de Bender.

=== Air ===
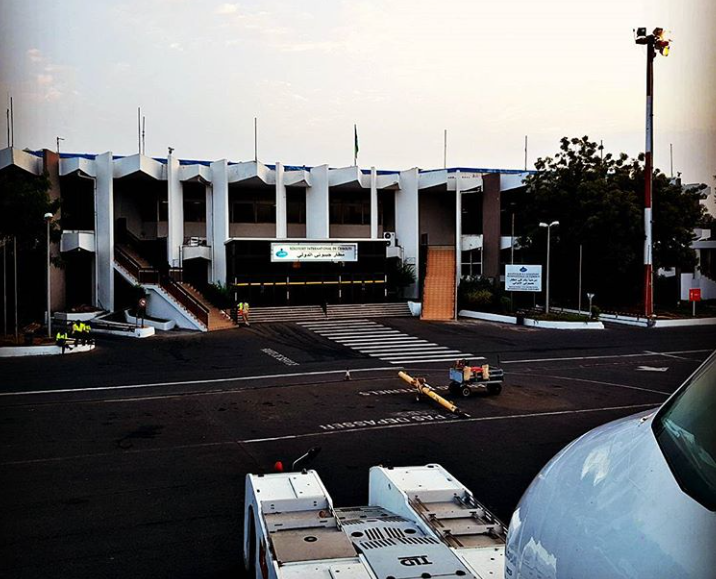
Djibouti-Ambouli International Airport

Djibouti is served primarily by the Djibouti-Ambouli International Airport. It is the second largest airport in the Horn of Africa, and offers flights to numerous global destinations. It is the largest airport in Djibouti and serves as a major gateway for travellers to the Horn of Africa and the world. Located approximately 6 kilometres (3.7 miles) from the city centre, the airport was opened in 1948. Originally a modest-sized facility, the airport grew considerably in size in the post-independence period after numerous successive renovation projects. Outbound international travel from the Djibouti-Ambouli International Airport accounts for the majority of all air passengers traveling to and from Djibouti. Due to its strategic location, the facility acts as a civil aviation hub for the rest of the country. This makes for a large number of departures and arrivals, and it is not unusual for flights to be delayed in the holding pattern before landing.

=== Sea ===
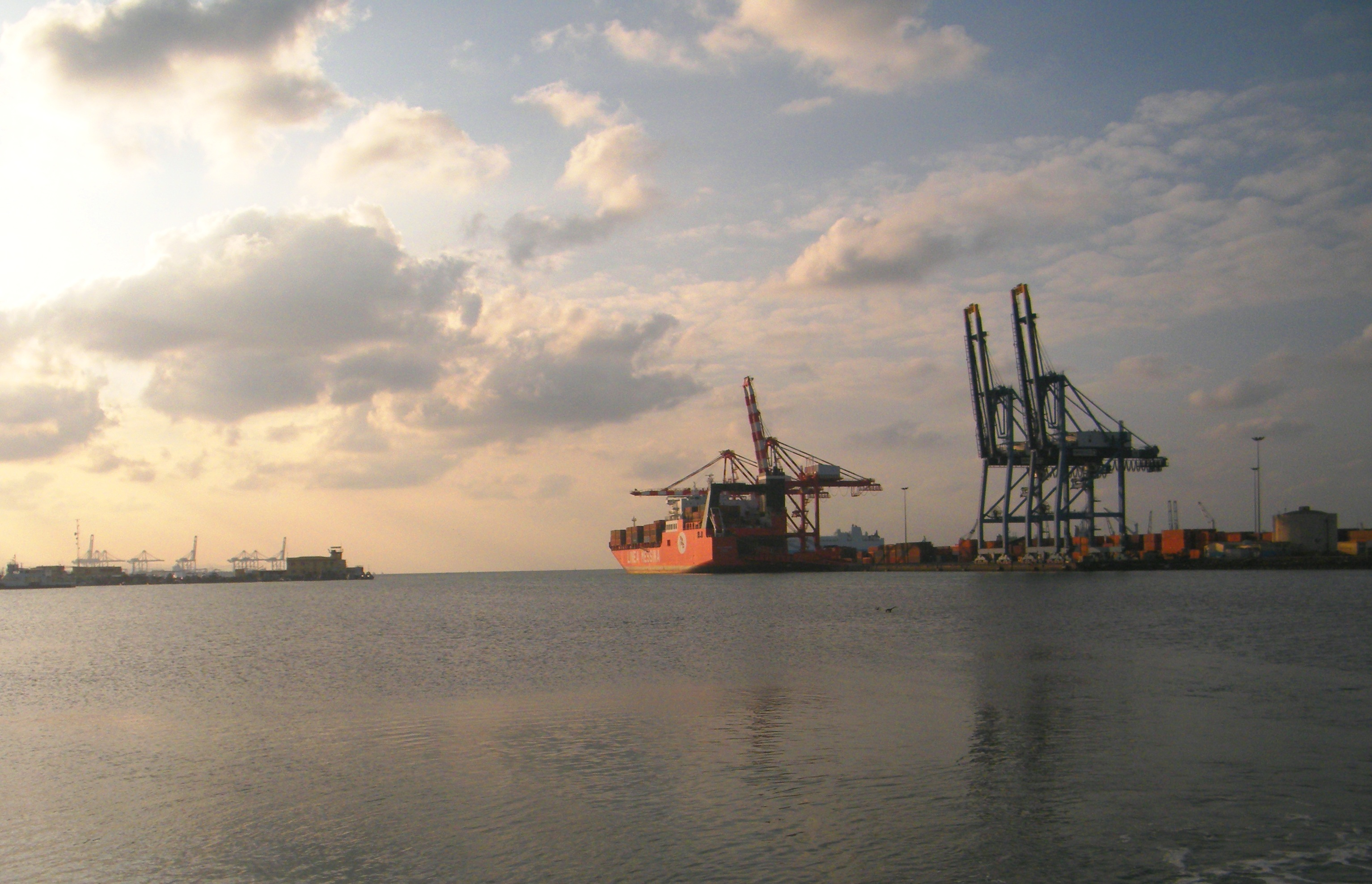
The container terminal at the Port of Djibouti

The Port of Djibouti is one of the largest and busiest seaports in the Horn region. As of 2013, the container terminal at the port handles the bulk of the nation's trade. About 70% of the seaport's activity consists of imports to and exports from neighboring Ethiopia, which depends on the harbour as its main maritime outlet. The port also serves as an international refueling center and transshipment hub. In 2012, the Djiboutian government in collaboration with DP World started construction on the Doraleh Container Terminal, a third major seaport intended to further develop the national transit capacity. A$396 million project, it has the capacity to accommodate 1.5 million 6.1-metre (20 ft) container units annually. There are also daily scheduled ferry services from the Port de Peche to Tadjoura, Obock also some other destinations in Yemen, Somalia and Eritrea.

=== Railway ===
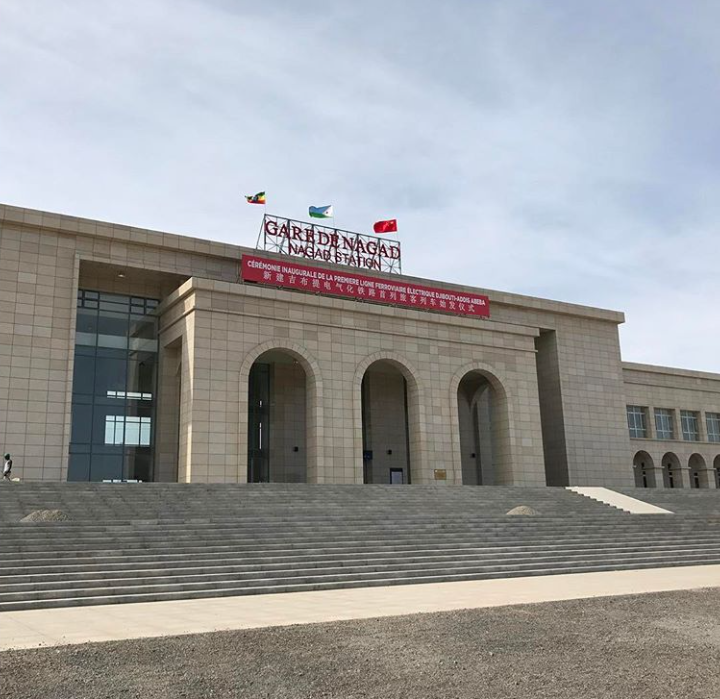
The Nagad Railway Station

Djibouti is a terminus of the Addis Ababa–Djibouti Railway. For most of its length, the railway runs parallel to the abandoned metre-gauge Ethio-Djibouti Railway. However, the standard-gauge railway is built on a new, straighter right-of-way that allows for much higher speeds. New stations have been built outside city centres, and the old stations have been decommissioned. On 10 January 2017, the 100 km section of Djibouti side was inaugurated in a ceremony held in the new station by Djibouti's President Ismail Omar Guelleh and Ethiopia's prime minister Hailemariam Dessalegn. There are two local railway stations: a passenger station at Nagad, and a freight station at the Port of Doraleh.

== Twin towns – sister cities ==
Djibouti is twinned with the following places:

Country	Town
United States	Saint Paul, Minnesota
Turkey	Ankara
Ethiopia	Addis Ababa

== Notable residents ==
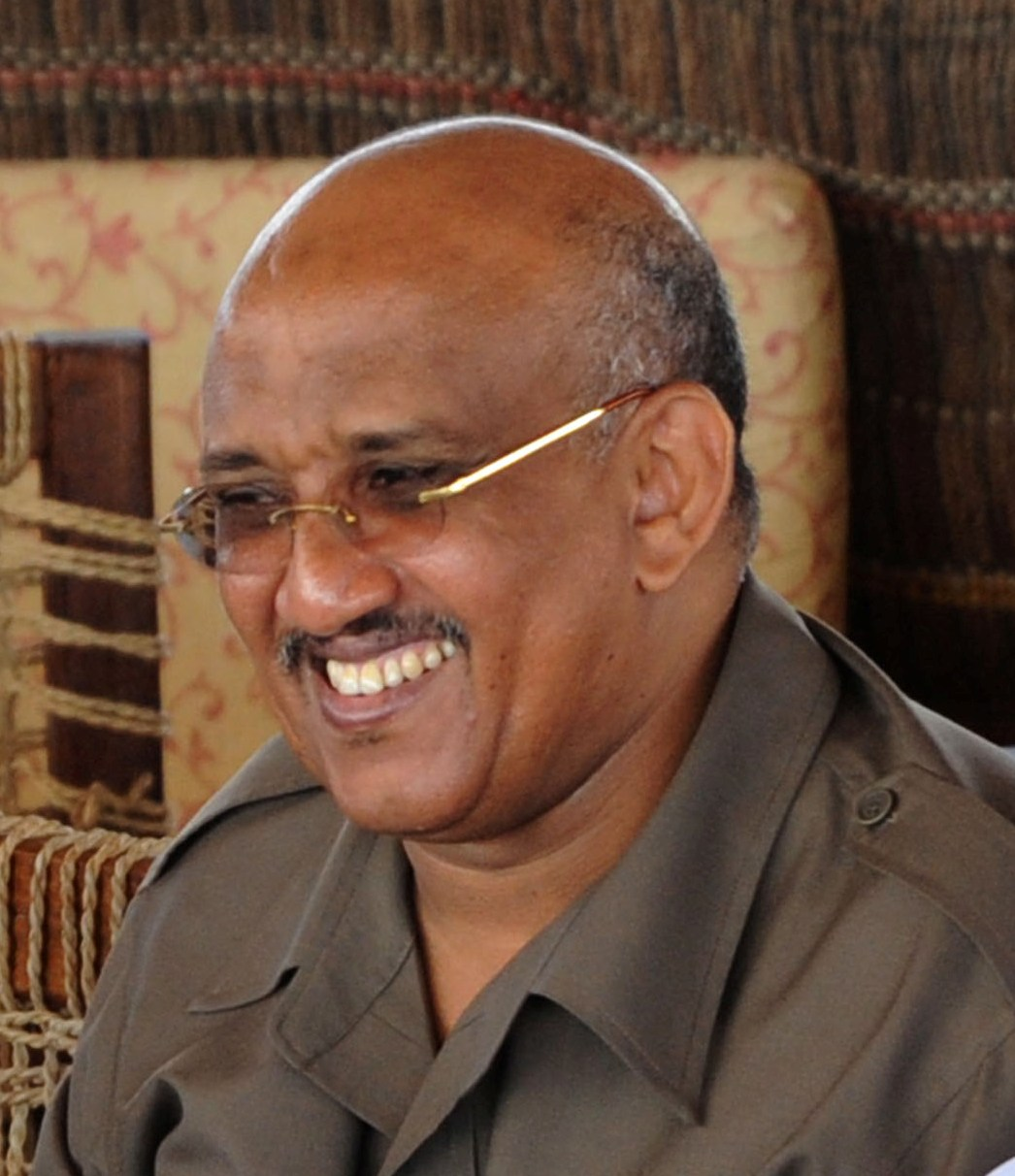
Dileita Mohamed Dileita, former Prime Minister of Djibouti and UMP representative in the sub-prefecture of Djibouti

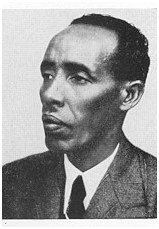
Djama Ali Moussa (Zayli'i), former Senator of French Somaliland (modern-day Djibouti) to the French Republic following the constitutional reforms of 1946, and a pioneering political figure and merchant who advanced early local representation

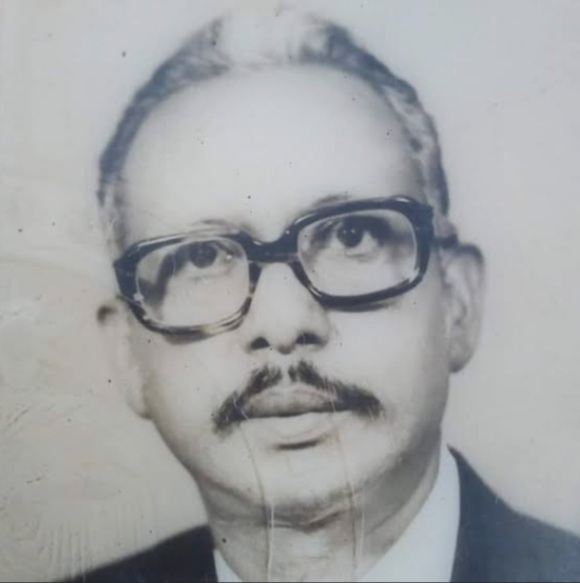
Sultan Mahomed Haji Dideh, former Sultan of Zeila, billionaire merchant, and main foundational trust builder in Djibouti City

- Ayanleh Souleiman: Professional athlete
- Lula Ali Ismaïl: Djiboutian-Canadian film director
- Aïcha Mohamed Robleh: Writer
- Jamal Abdi Dirieh: Athlete
- Fadumo Ahmed Dhimbiil: Musician
- Moumin Guelleh: Athlete
- Abdourahman Waberi: Novelist
- Mohamed Ali Fourchette: Musician
- Yacin Elmi Bouh: Politician
- Xabiiba Balbalaaf: Musician
- Dileita Mohamed Dileita: Former Prime Minister of Djibouti
- Nimo Boulhan Houssein, Politician
- Mohamed Ali Mohamed: Politician
- Abdi Waiss Mouhyadin: Athlete
- Choukri Djibah: Politician and Women's equality activist
- Dya-Eddine Said Bamakhrama, diplomat

== See also ==
- Greater Somalia
