= Tourism in Djibouti =

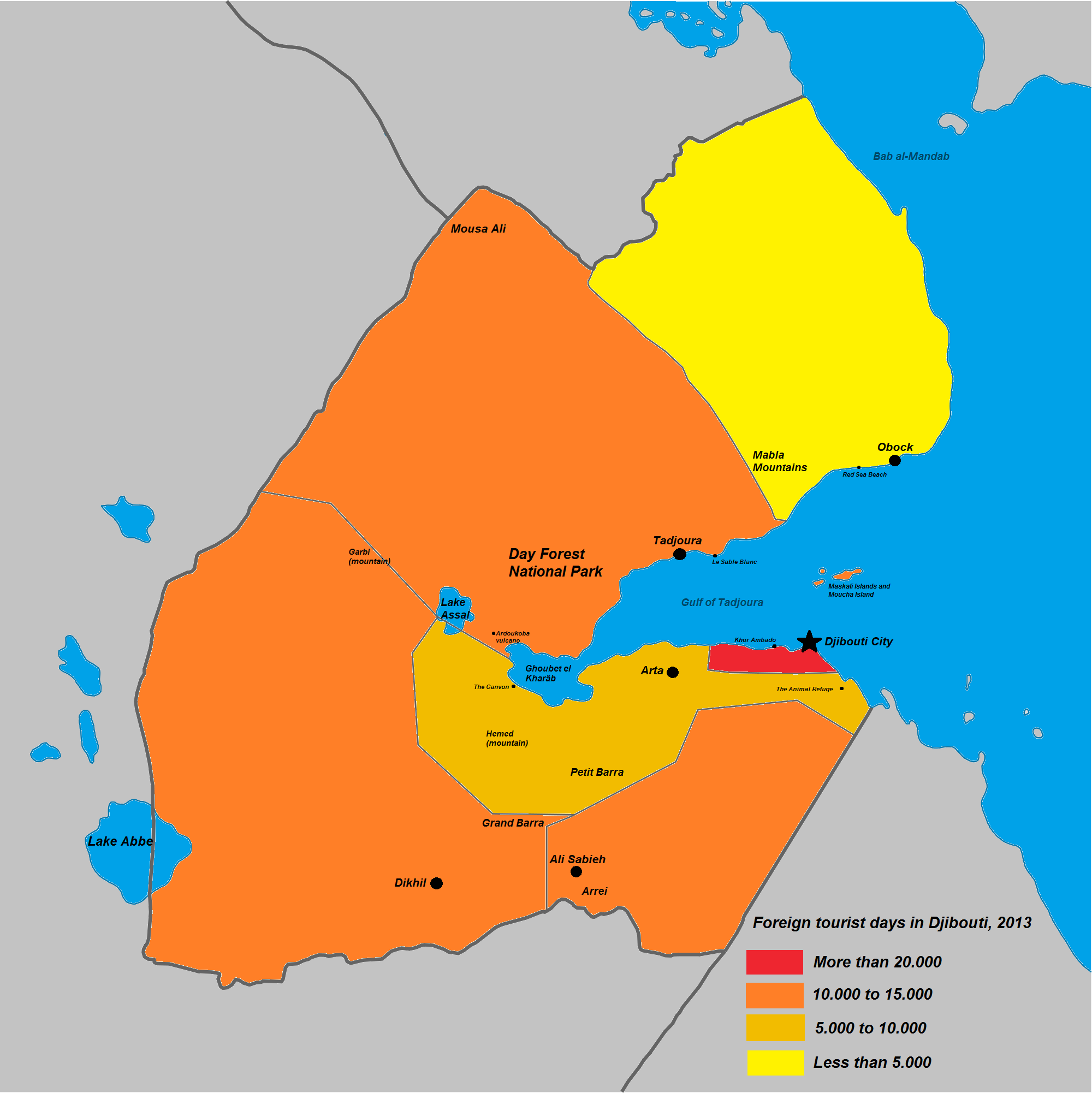
The foreign tourist days in Djibouti, 2013

Tourism in Djibouti is one of the growing economic sectors of the country and is an industry that generates 53,000 and 73,000 arrivals per year, with its favorable beaches and climate and also including islands and beaches in the Gulf of Tadjoura and the Bab al-Mandab. The main tourist activities are scuba diving, fishing, trekking and hiking, discovering the nomadic way, bird watching, and sun, sea and sand.

== Overview ==
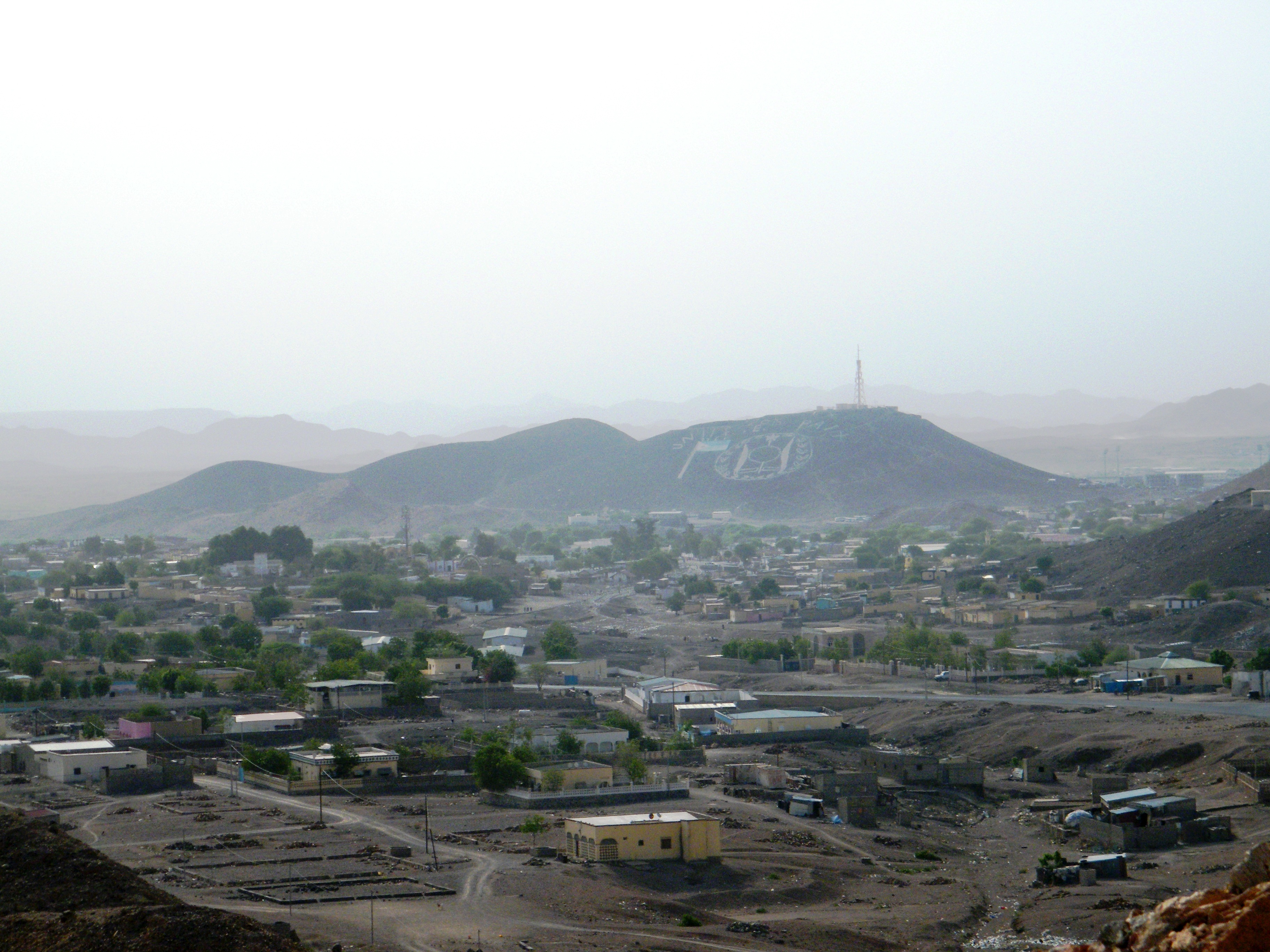
The town of Ali Sabieh, with the Red Mountains in the distance

At Goubbet-al-Kharab, near the western end of the Gulf of Tadjoura, there are steep cliffs and a bay that was turned dark green by black lava. A number of active volcanoes are located inland from here. Another popular tourist attraction is the Day Forest National Park for conserving rare trees on Mount Goda. Near the town of Ali Sabieh are famously red mountains and a national park full of many gazelles. The coastal plains, mountain ranges, and volcanic plateaus of the country make a picturesque sight. Some popular local attractions include the Presidential Palace, the Central Market, Maskali Islands, Moucha Island, Lake Abbe and Lake Assal. The coastlines of Djibouti harbor many stretches of beaches that are frequented by sun bathers and other visitors.

The Djiboutian government, realizing the great potential of development of national tourism, takes a variety of measures for this - for example, the maximum mode facilitating foreign investment in tourism infrastructure. Priority is given to the construction of hotels and the construction of roads that meet the latest international standards.

== Regulation ==
The tourist industry in Djibouti is regulated by the Ministry of Commerce and Tourism. According to the UNWTO, the annual number of tourists visiting the country is uncertain. However, international tourism locally generated $21 million USD in revenue in 2012.

== Arrivals by country ==
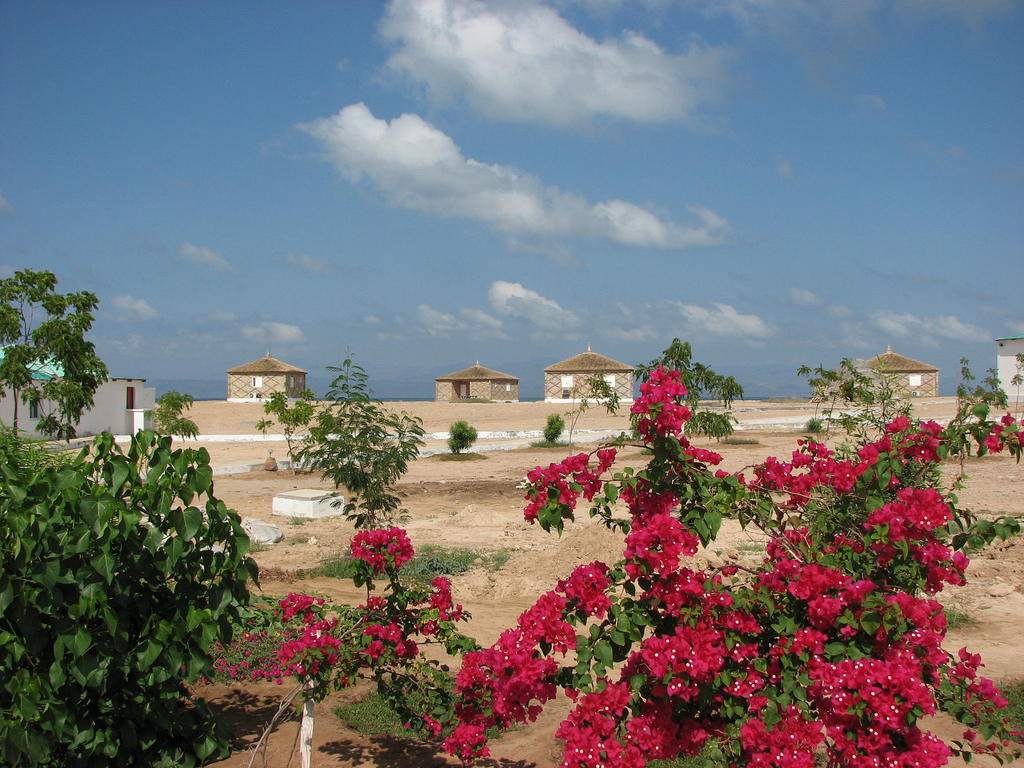
View on the Moucha Island.

According to Office National du Tourisme de Djibouti (ONTD) figures, almost half of all visitors, or 48%, came from France, with 21% arriving from other European countries. The third-largest group came from Gulf states. Visitors from Africa represented just 6%, with the majority of them coming from Ethiopia. Finally, visitors from Asia and North America represented minor percentages at 5% and 3%, respectively.

== Attractions ==
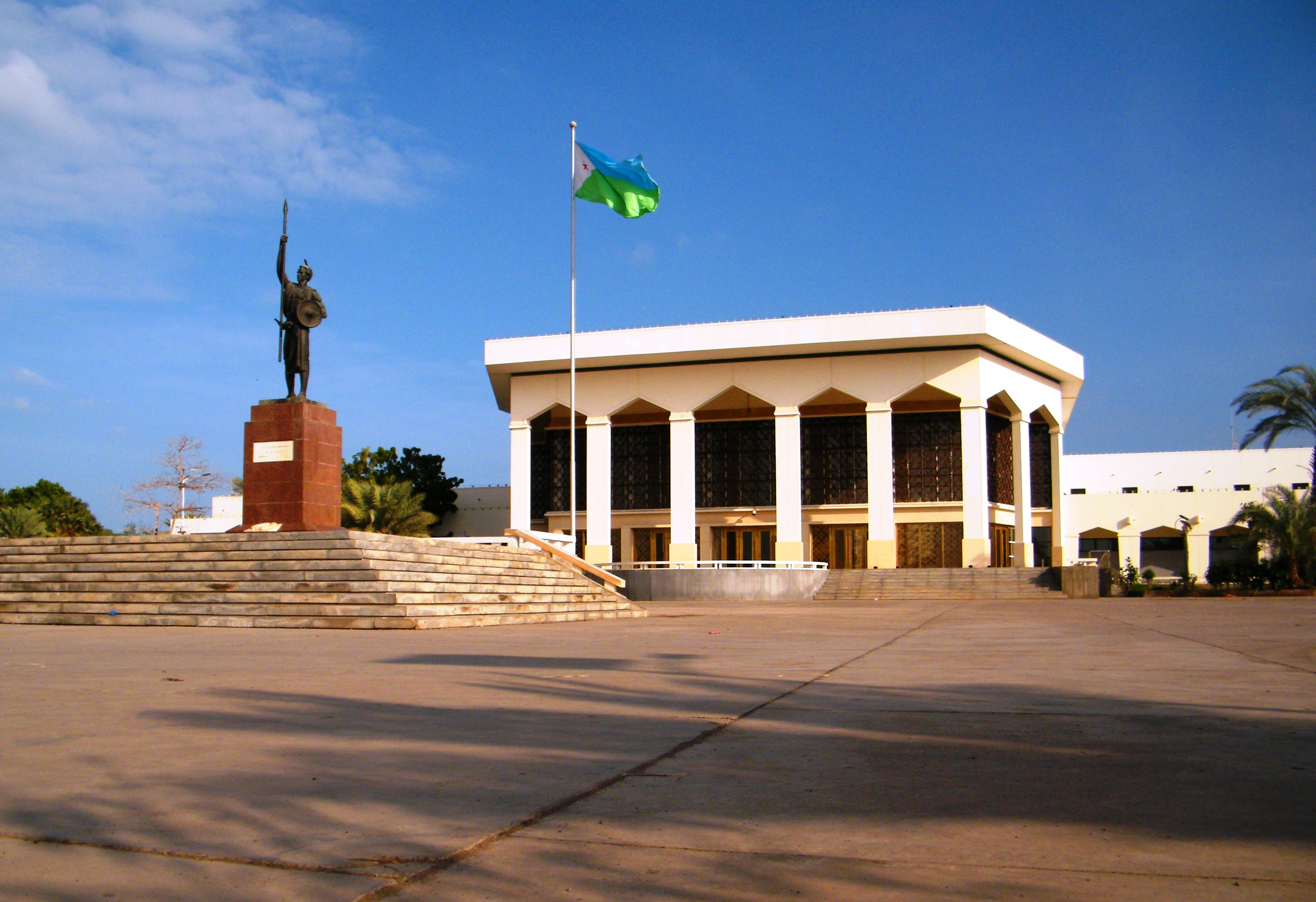
The People's Palace.

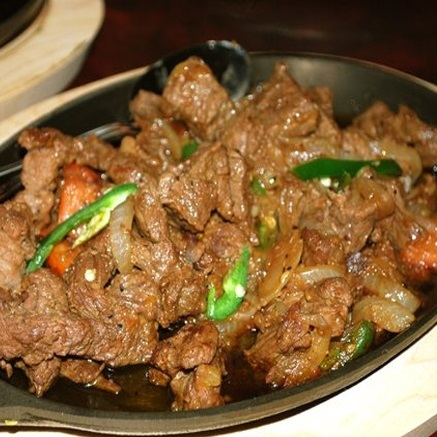
Dromedary Tibs served at a restaurant in Djibouti.

Djibouti has a number of local attractions, consisting of historical sites, National Park, beaches and mountain ranges.

=== Local attractions ===
- Djibouti City - The People Palace
- Djibouti City - Rue Venice
- Djibouti City - The Presidential Palace

=== Day Forest National Park ===
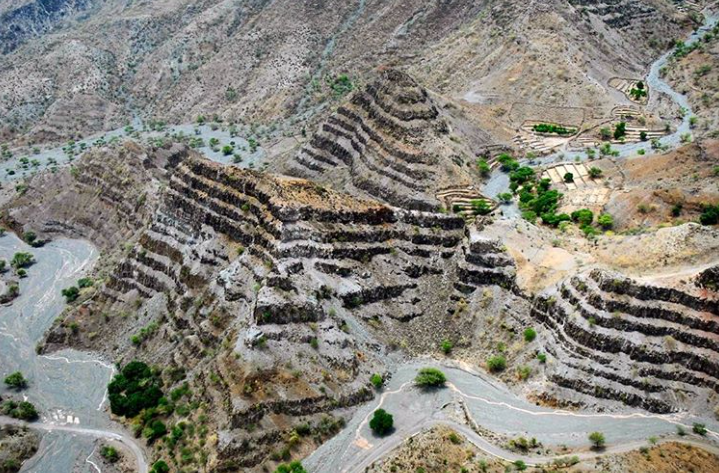
Near Randa.

Day Forest National Park established in 1939, protects the Goda Mountains. and also is the largest forest in Djibouti.

=== Foods ===
Djibouti has many popular restaurants serving their local foods to tourists.

=== Historical sites ===
- Tadjoura – Korijib is one of the oldest mosques in the Horn of Africa.
- Djibouti City – The Grand Mosque of Hamoudi.
- Loyada – Beach and palm grove, with the tombs of important historical leaders in the region.

=== Beaches ===
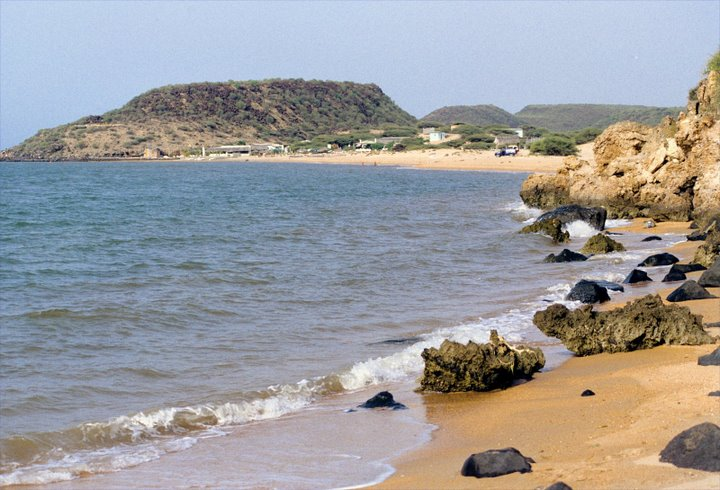
The Khor Ambado beachside.

- Siesta Beach – Djibouti City
- Red Sea Beach – Near Obock
- Khor Ambado – Near Djibouti City
- Le Sable Blanc – Tadjoura
- Heron Beach – Djibouti City

=== Mountain ranges ===
- Goda Mountains
- Arrei Mountains
- Mabla Mountains
- Garbi

=== Islands ===
- Moucha Island
- Maskali Islands
- Seven Brothers Islands

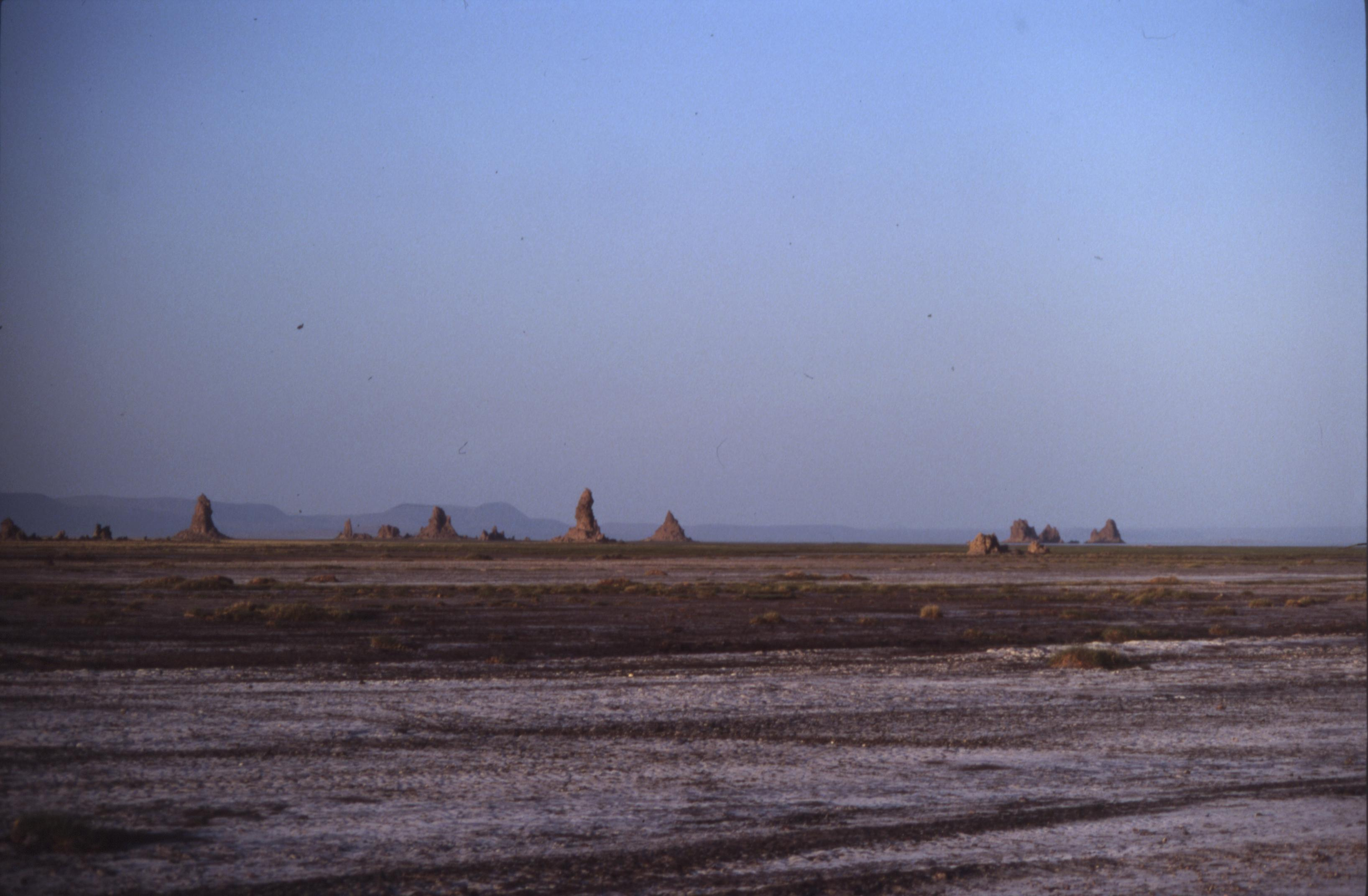
Lake Abbe.

=== Salt lakes ===
- Lake Abbe
- Lake Assal
