= Sagallo =

Village in Tadjourah Region, Djibouti

Sagallo Сагалло ساغلو
- Village
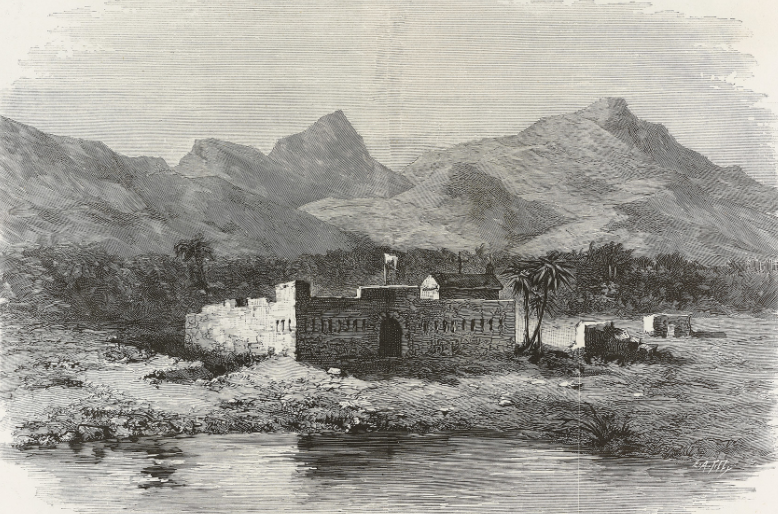
- Engraving showing Sagallo under Nikolai Ashinov's control

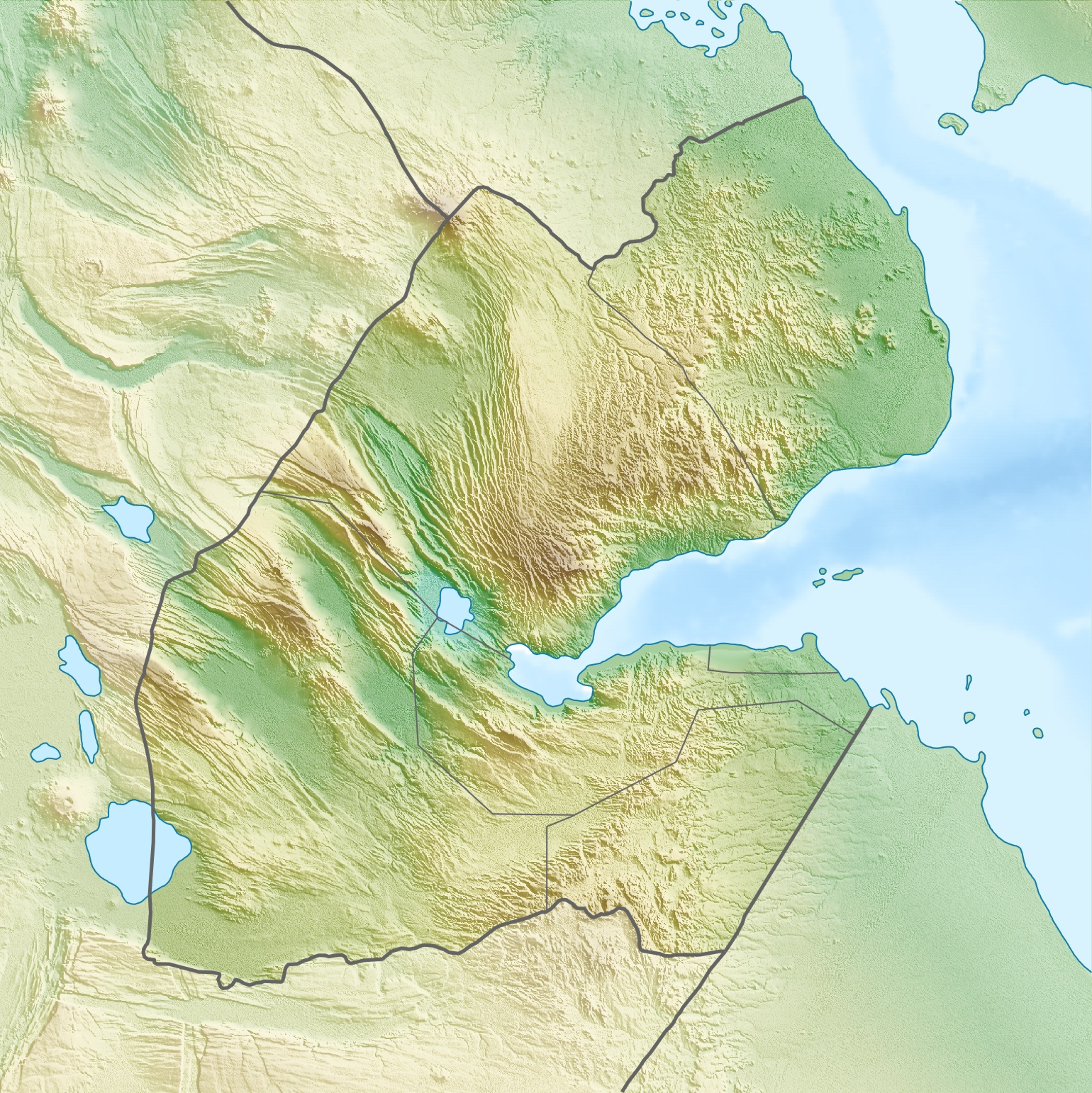
- Location in Djibouti
- Coordinates: 11°40′19″N 42°44′01″E
- Country: Djibouti
- Prefecture: Tadjourah Region
- Sub-prefecture: Lac Assal
- Elevation: 21 m (69 ft)

Population (2024 census)
  - Total: 977
- Time zone: UTC+03:00 (EAT)

Sagallo (Russian: Сагалло; Arabic: ساغلو; French: Sagallou; Somali: Sagaalo) is a village situated on the Gulf of Tadjoura, in the country of Djibouti, famous for having been occupied by a Russian expedition in 1889.

== Name ==
Whether a coincidence or not, "Sagallo" (or "Sakaro") is one of the lunar months in the Somali calendar.

The etymology of the name is unknown.

== History ==
The Ottoman Empire had lost control of the area from the sixteenth to the nineteenth century. In reality, however, the Afar Sultans of Tadjoura were in control. It was during this time, that Sagallo was visited by the Englishman William Cornwallis Harris on his way to Ankobar, in the year 1841. His assistant surgeon, who wrote the report on the expedition, mentioned that water in the village was abundant in wells.

Timeline of Sagallo
Historical affiliations

Tadjoura (to 1873)
Ottoman Empire (Khedivate of Egypt) 1873-1884
France (French Somaliland) 1884–1889
Russian Empire (expedition) 1889
France (French Somaliland and FTAI) 1889-1977
Djibouti 1977–present

By the early 1870s, Egypt had been gaining power in the region and, in 1873, the Egyptians occupied Sagallo and other sites on the Gulf of Tadjoura, but their hold didn't last long. In 1884, the Sultan of Tadjoura, Mohammed Loitah, ceded Sagallo to French explorer Paul Soleillet, forcing the Egyptians to retire.

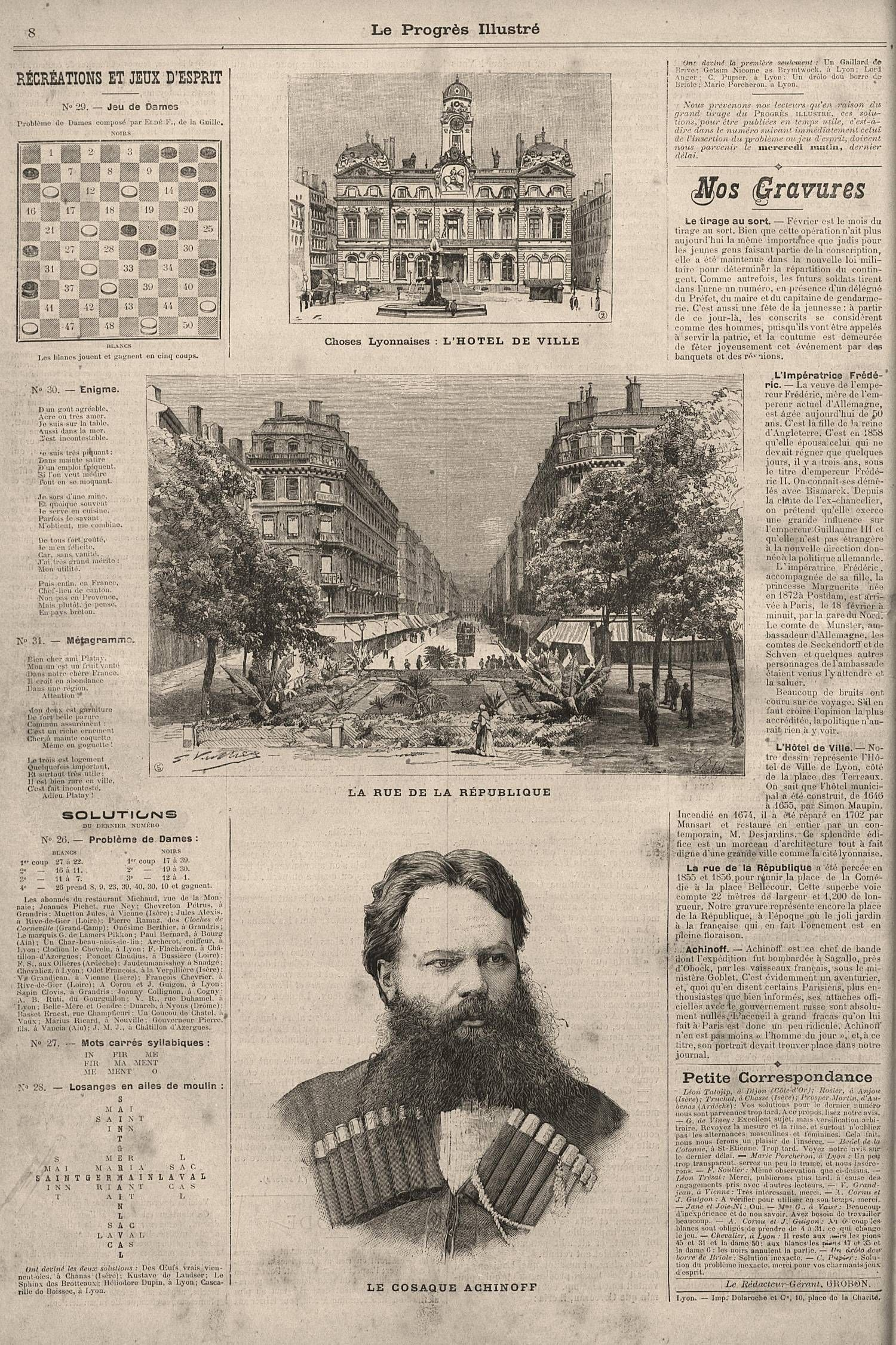
An article from Le Progrès Illustré on Achinov's expedition

In 1883, Nikolai Ivanovich Ashinov, a Russian adventurer and burgess of Penza (b. 1856) had visited Abyssinia (the Ethiopian Empire) in order to establish clerical and political ties between the two countries. After his return to Russia, Achinov voiced his plans for an 1888 expedition to the Gulf of Tadjoura to establish a settlement, while claiming to be a free Cossack. Achinov assured the participants that Mohammed Loitah had permanently leased him land in the region. It was purely on his own initiative, and without the involvement of the Russian government, that on 10 December 1888, Achinov along with 165 Terek Cossacks boarded the Kornilov, a ship heading from Odessa to Alexandria. The expedition then boarded the Lazarev which brought them to Port Said. There, Achinov rented the Austrian ship Amfitrida, which entered the Gulf of Tadjoura on 6 January 1889. The expedition was greeted by a group of Ethiopian priests. The French foreign office demanded an explanation for Achinov's actions and the Russian ambassador in Paris distanced the Russian Empire from him. On January 14, the abandoned Egyptian fort of Sagallo was chosen as the new base of the expedition. Achinov named the fort "New Moscow" (Новая Москва, Novaya Moskva). A tent was erected to serve as the church of St. Nicholas and a flag of the expedition was raised. Later, several French colonists escaped to Obock, informing their comrades of the settlement's whereabouts. On 5 February, the Cossacks noticed a French cruiser and three French gunboats. An ultimatum was issued, but Achinov did not surrender. The artillery barrage that followed left six Russian colonists dead and 22 wounded. Achinov and his men subsequently fled Sagallo, returning the settlement to French control.

In 1977, after three referendums, the French Territory of the Afars and the Issas finally became independent from France as the newly formed country of Djibouti. By this point, the water had become scarce, and the community of Sagallo used generators to run water pumps, even though it often fell short of raising enough cash to purchase diesel to power the generators. In the early 21st century, however, a UNICEF-backed project installed solar panels on a hill to power a submersible pump that now delivers the water whenever needed.

== Climate ==
Climate data for Sagallo
Month	Jan	Feb	Mar	Apr	May	Jun	Jul	Aug	Sep	Oct	Nov	Dec	Year
Mean daily maximum °C (°F)	29.2 (84.6)	29.4 (84.9)	31.4 (88.5)	33.5 (92.3)	36.5 (97.7)	40.1 (104.2)	41.8 (107.2)	40.8 (105.4)	38.0 (100.4)	34.2 (93.6)	31.5 (88.7)	29.9 (85.8)	34.7 (94.4)
Mean daily minimum °C (°F)	20.2 (68.4)	23.2 (73.8)	24.6 (76.3)	26.2 (79.2)	28.8 (83.8)	31.7 (89.1)	31.0 (87.8)	30.5 (86.9)	30.8 (87.4)	26.5 (79.7)	24.1 (75.4)	21.0 (69.8)	26.6 (79.8)
Average precipitation mm (inches)	10 (0.4)	8 (0.3)	12 (0.5)	13 (0.5)	7 (0.3)	1 (0.0)	6 (0.2)	20 (0.8)	9 (0.4)	11 (0.4)	22 (0.9)	15 (0.6)	134 (5.3)
Source: Climate-Data.org

== See also ==
- Afro-Russians
- Russian colonialism
- Scramble for Africa
