= Gulf of Tadjoura =

Gulf of the Indian Ocean in the Horn of Africa

- Somali: Gacanka Tajuura; Arabic: خليج تجرة
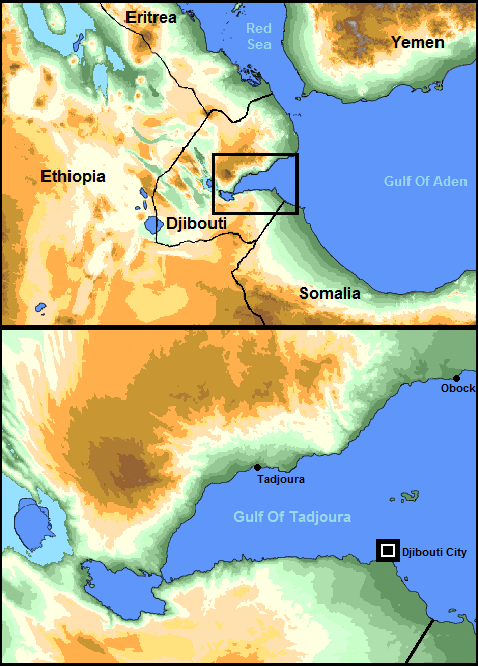
- Interactive map of Gulf of Tadjoura
- Coordinates: 11.7°N 43.0°E
- Basin countries: Djibouti; Somaliland
- Max. length: 40 mi (64 km)
- Max. width: 16 mi (26 km)
- Surface area: 1,920 km^{2} (740 sq mi)
- Average depth: −1,078 m (−3,537 ft)
- Salinity: 3.6–3.7%
- Max. temperature: 31 °C (88 °F)
- Min. temperature: 26 °C (79 °F)
- Islands: Moucha, Maskali, Abou Maya, Ile Warramous
- Settlements: Djibouti: Djibouti, Tadjoura, Sagallo, Obock and Loyada; Somaliland: Lawyacado

The Gulf of Tadjoura (Somali: Gacanka Tajuura; Arabic: خليج تجرة) is a gulf or basin of the Indian Ocean in the Horn of Africa. It lies south of the straits of Bab-el-Mandeb, or the entrance to the Red Sea, at 11.7°N 43.0°E. The gulf has many fishing grounds, extensive coral reefs, and abundant pearl oysters. Most of its coastline is the territory of Djibouti, except for a short stretch on the southern shore, which is part of the territory of Somaliland.

The Gulf’s other marine habitats include sea grass beds, salt pans and mangroves.

== History ==
In August 1840, the conclusion of a treaty of friendship and commerce between the Sultan Mohammed bin Mohammed of Tadjoura and Commander Robert Moresby of the Indian Navy is tracking the sale of Moucha Island to Great Britain for ten sacks of rice. The sale will however follow any occupation. In 1887, Britain cedes sovereignty of the island to France at the same time it recognizes the French sphere of influence in the Gulf of Tadjoura, in exchange for the abandonment by France of any right in Zeila and the neighboring islands.

== Geography ==
The area of the gulf is about 900 km^{2} (350 sq mi). The length (from the Sagallo to Obock) is 64 km (40 mi), and the width is up to 26 km (16 mi).The gulf is relatively shallow, with the depth decreasing from the entrance of the gulf to the continent. The coast is mostly sloping; there are abundant sandy dunes, with occasional palm trees. The southern shores are smooth and shallow.

At the entrance of the Gulf is the group of small islands of Moucha and Maskali. At the bottom of the Gulf, separated only by a narrow neck of land, are Ghoubbet-el-Kharab and Assal (54 km^{2}). Geologically, formerly covered the Gulf to Lake Assal, which is now about 155 meters below sea level.

=== Limits ===
The limits of the Gulf of Tadjoura as follows:

On the East – The western limit of the Gulf of Aden (A line joining Obock and Lawyacado).
On the West – The meridian of Ghoubbet-el-Kharab.

== Islands ==
The Gulf of Tadjoura is home to many small islands. Geographically the biggest island in the Gulf of Tadjoura is Moucha Island. The Gulf of Tadjoura islands are often also historically significant, having been used in the past by colonial powers such as the French and the British in their trade or as acquisitions for their empires.

== Wildlife ==
The wildlife of the Gulf of Tadjoura is diverse, and entirely unique due to the gulf's geographic distribution. The Gulf of Tadjoura has hosted some of the most magnificent marine fauna and flora, some of which are near extinction or at serious environmental risk. From corals, to dugongs, Gulf of Tadjoura is a diverse cradle for many species who depend on each other for survival.

== Population ==
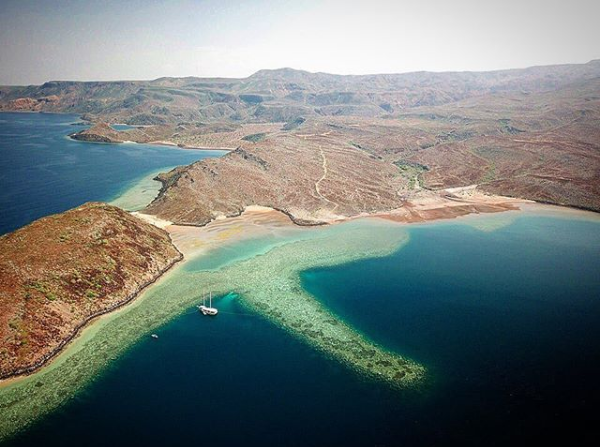
The coastline along the Arta Region.

The Gulf of Tadjoura is far more densely populated on the Djiboutian shore. The most significant towns and cities along both the Djiboutian and Somali sides of the Gulf of Tadjoura

=== Djibouti ===
- Djibouti City: 529,000
- Tadjoura: 45,000
- Obock: 21,000
- Loyada: 1,367
- Sagallo: 719

=== Somaliland ===
- Lawyacado: 1,650

== Tourism ==
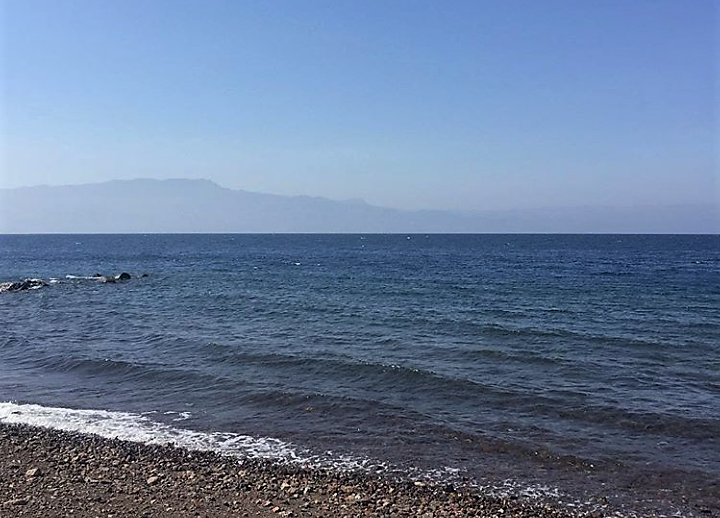
Arta Plage and the Gulf Of Tadjoura

The Gulf of Tadjoura is one of the major tourist attractions for Djibouti, believed to be a perfect place for snorkelling with whale sharks, diving and underwater photography. There are two important towns on the gulf: Obock, where Afar and Somali sultans had sold settlement rights to the French, and Tadjoura, which houses seven important mosques and offers magnificent views from the sea.

Tadjoura is beautifully surrounded by the green Goda Mountains. The hills of this mountain are 1,700 metres (5,600 ft). Due to coral reefs, the Gulf of Tadjoura is a heaven for divers and snorkelers. It attracts 40% of foreign tourists visiting Djibouti.

== Economy ==
Passenger transport on the gulf includes a number of ferry lines which connect the following ports: Djibouti City, Tadjoura and Obock.
