= Randa (district) =

- Administrative sub-prefecture
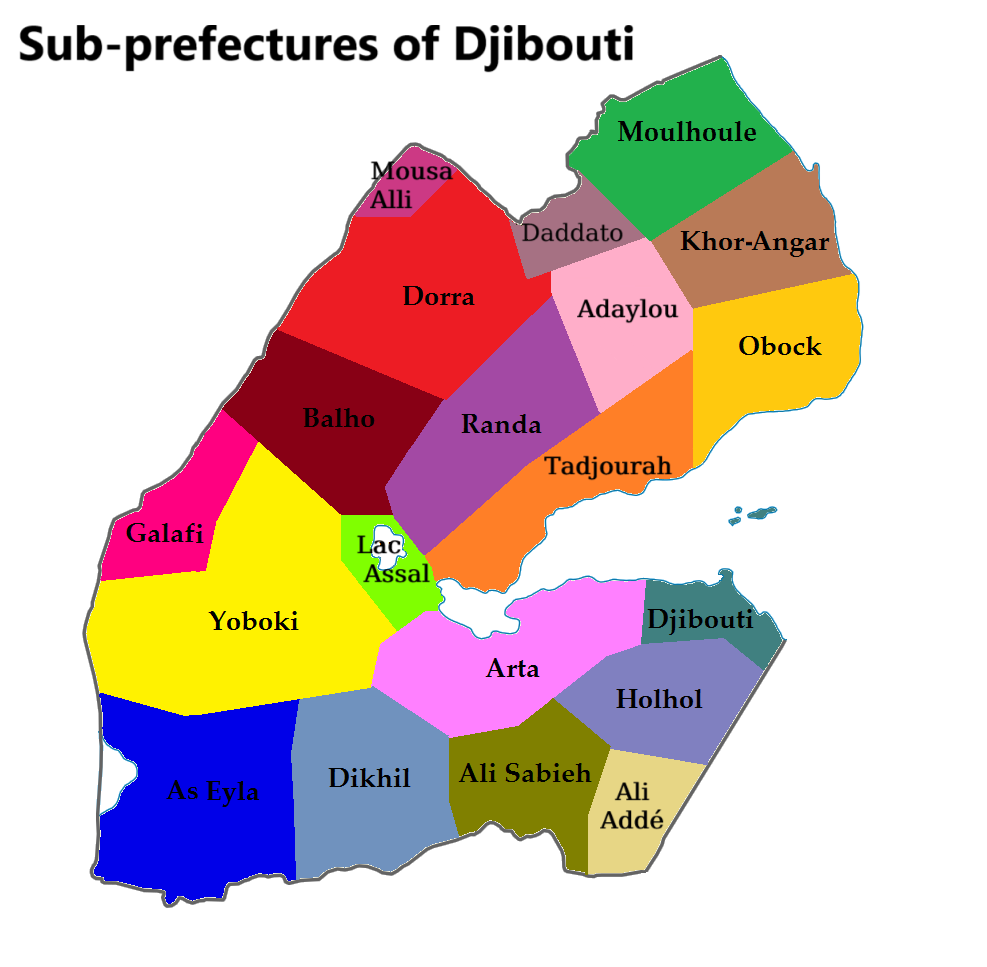
- Country: Djibouti
- Region: Tadjourah Region

Randa is an Administrative sub-prefecture in Djibouti.

== See also ==
- Sub-prefectures of Djibouti
