= Lawyacado =

- Town
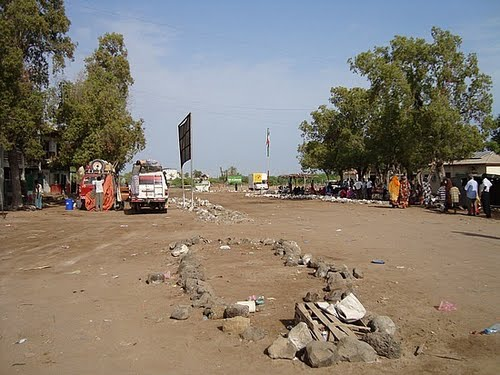

- Location in Somaliland Lawyacado (Somaliland)
- Coordinates: 11°27′28″N 43°15′34″E
- Country: Somaliland
- Region: Awdal
- District: Zeila
- Elevation: 7 m (23 ft)
- Time zone: UTC+3 (EAT)
- Climate: BWh

Lawyacado (Lowyacaddo, Lawya Cado, Lawya Caddo, Lowya Cadde) is a town in the Awdal region of Somaliland. It is situated on the border with Djibouti.

The town across the border in Djibouti is Loyada, a name derived from the Afar language, which, when rewritten in Somali, becomes Lawyacado, which translates to "with a white calf".

== Demographics ==
The town inhabitants belong to various mainly Afro-Asiatic-speaking ethnic groups, with the Bahabar Celi - Bahabar Aadan - Bahabar Muuse - Reer Maxamed Gadabuursi and Issa subclans of the Dir especially well represented.

== Livestock ==
Lawyacado is one of the Livestock markets in the region, along with Zeila, Lawaya-Adde, and Djibouti City.

Livestock exports via Lawyacado in 2012 were 72,326 Sheep and Goats, and 3,779 Camels.

== Customs office ==
Lawyacado has a customs office to Djibouti.

=== History of customs ===
In December 2013, users protested that the entry fee to Somaliland was raised from 20,000 shillings to 26,000 shillings at the Lawyacado customs office. The Salal administration announced that there has been no increase in taxes and that customs operations are normal.

In July 2014, Djibouti requested that the border through Lawyacado is closed and that the location of the customs is moved from Lawyacado to Zeila in the east. After a delegation including the Somaliland Minister of Interior visited Djibouti and negotiated, the border was opened while maintaining the customs location in Lawyacado.

In February 2015, the government of Djibouti completely closed its border with Somaliland. This is seen as a countermeasure to Al-Shabaab's call to attack Western countries. People protesting this in Lawyacado burned tires and held other demonstrations. However, the President of Djibouti denied closing the border.

In December 2018, the Somaliland government arrested Lawyacado Customs Director General and other key officials.

In July 2019, the Zeila regional government raised the toll for vehicles in Lawyacado from $3 to $6, citing it as a road construction cost.

In April 2020, the border at Lawyacado was closed, likely due to an increase in the number of people entering the country from Djibouti to escape COVID-19.

In December 2020, the President of Somaliland, who was traveling to Djibouti, returned overland to Somaliland and visited Lawyacado. The border between Djibouti and Somaliland had been closed for six years but was restored on this day.

In January 2021, the President of Somaliland announced the elimination of a $31 tax imposed on citizens traveling from Somaliland to Djibouti via Lawyacado.

In July 2022, a meeting on border movement between Somaliland and Djibouti was held in Lawyacado, where it was agreed that a transit fee of $16 for Djiboutian citizens and 30,000 shillings for Somaliland citizens would be imposed.

== Intercity road ==
Relation map
Bo=Borama, Dj=Djibouti City, Ha=Hargeisa, La=Lawyacado, Lo=Loyada, Ze=Zeila

In October 2013, Somaliland's Salal Governor criticized the road connecting Zeila and Lawyacado for being in disrepair.

In July 2019, the Somaliland government announced the construction of the Borama-Lawyacado road.

In December 2019, six companies were selected as finalists for the Borama-Lawyacado road construction feasibility study. Approximately 280 km of road is being financed by the African Development Bank under the Road Infrastructure Program.

In August 2021, the Somaliland Minister of Transportation announced the road development project and mentioned the road between Borama and Lawyacado.

== Recent history ==
In June 1989, the Somali National Movement (predecessor of Somaliland) occupied Lawyacado.

In May 1990, the Somali government accused Djibouti of invading Lawyacado and killing 36 villagers. Djibouti's defense minister denied this.

In July 2011, a delegation led by the President of Djibouti and the Minister of Finance of Somaliland met in Lawyacado.

In April 2014, the interior ministers of Somaliland and Djibouti met in Lawyacado.

In May 2014, an explosion killed three people in a restaurant in Djibouti. Al-Shabaab was responsible for the crime. The perpetrators were found to have entered Djibouti via Lawyacado from Hargeisa, the capital of Somaliland.

In June 2014, there was a severe water shortage in Zeila due to mechanical problems with the well. Due to the increase in water prices, people from Lawyacado could not buy water.

In December 2014, Somaliland's military commander and Djibouti's military commander met in Lawyacado.

In April 2018, Somalia's Director of Immigration visited Lawyacado during his visit to Djibouti. However, it is unclear if he entered Somaliland.

In September 2018, Lawyacado fishermen protested that fishing boats from India and Sri Lanka were fishing illegally. The fishing boats responded that they employ Lawyacado fishermen.

In October 2019, the Djibouti government opposed a building that Somaliland's Ministry of Finance wanted to build in Lawyacado, leading to a confrontation between the two forces across the border.

In February 2020, Mayor Zeila and the coordinator of the Lawyacado Maternal and Child Health Ministry confronted each other.

In July 2020, there was a water shortage in Lawyacado. Water was transported by tanker from Djibouti but was insufficient and expensive.

In December 2020, the Minister of Defense of Somaliland inspected the national army garrisons in Lughaya and Lawyacado.
