= Galafi (district) =

- Administrative sub-prefecture
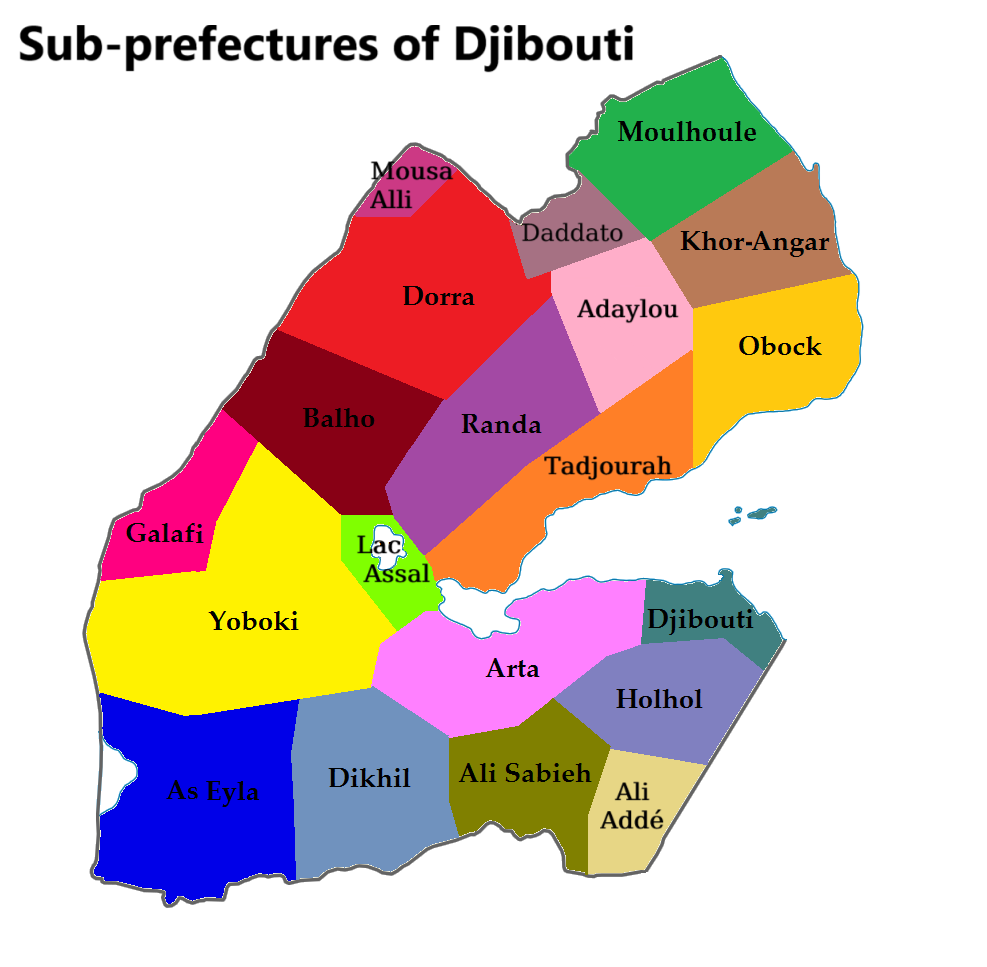
- Country: Djibouti
- Region: Dikhil Region

Galafi is an Administrative sub-prefecture in Djibouti.

== See also ==
- Sub-prefectures of Djibouti
