= Ile Warramous Island =

Islet in Djibouti

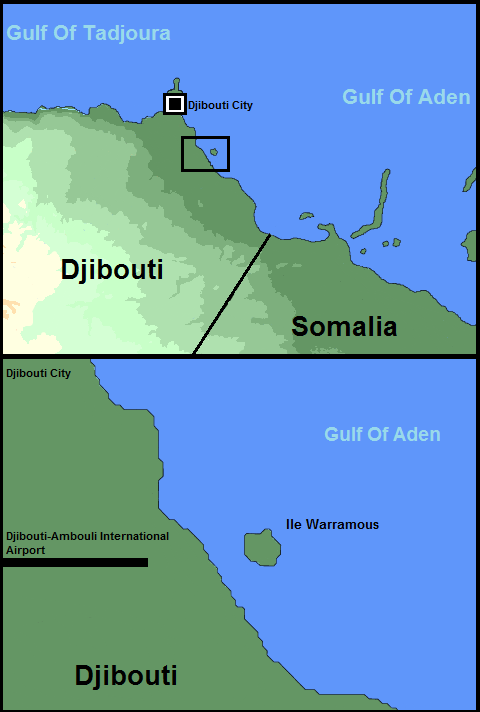

Geography
- Location: Gulf of Tadjoura, Gulf of Aden
- Coordinates: 11.337860°N 43.111646°E
- Area: 0.278 km^{2} (0.107 sq mi)
- Length: 0.44 km (0.273 mi)
- Width: 0.37 km (0.23 mi)
- Highest elevation: 7 m (23 ft)

Administration
- Djibouti

The Ile Warramous Island is a small uninhabited islet about 1.28 kilometres (0.80 miles) off the east coast of Djibouti in the Gulf of Tadjoura and Gulf of Aden. The island lies near the city of Djibouti. The island is not open for the public with no civil population.
