= Dorra (district) =

- Administrative sub-prefecture
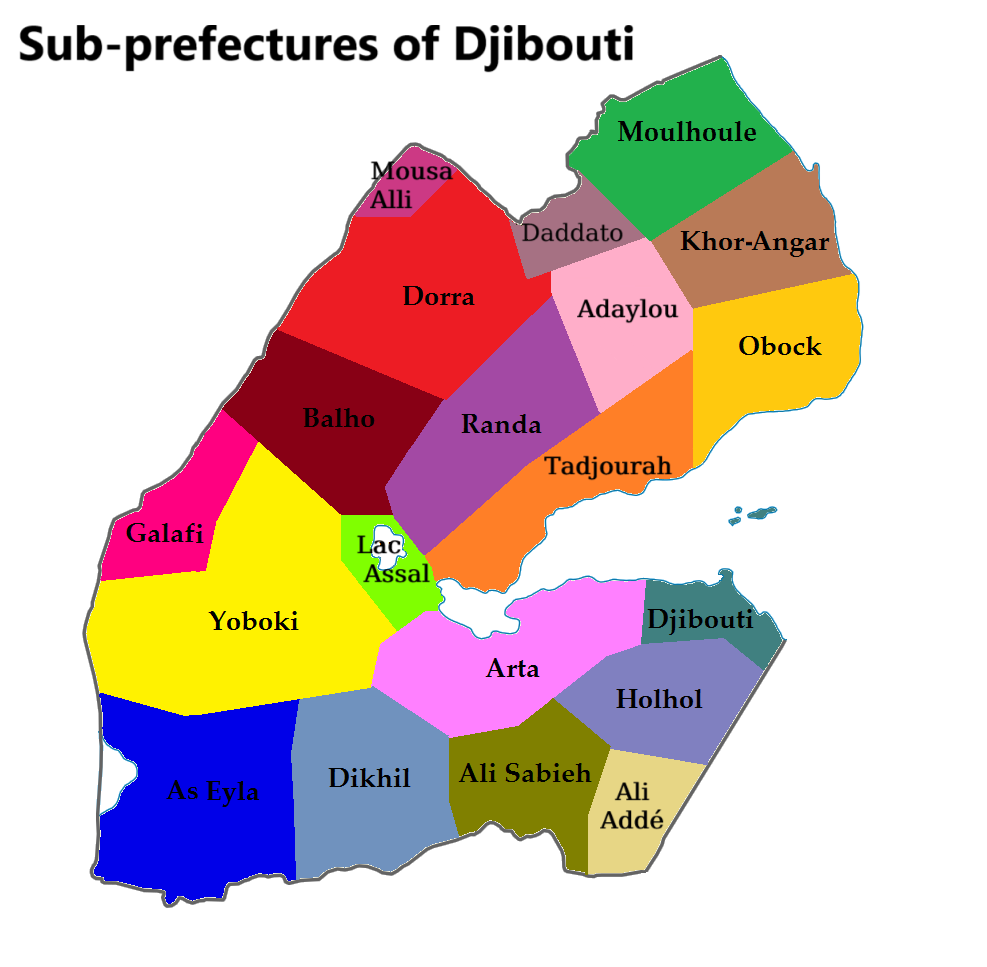
- Country: Djibouti
- Region: Tadjourah Region

Dorra is an Administrative sub-prefecture.

== See also ==
- Sub-prefectures of Djibouti
