= Lac 'Assal (district) =

Administrative sub-prefecture of Djibouti

Coordinates: 11°38′37″N 42°26′08″E

- Administrative sub-prefecture
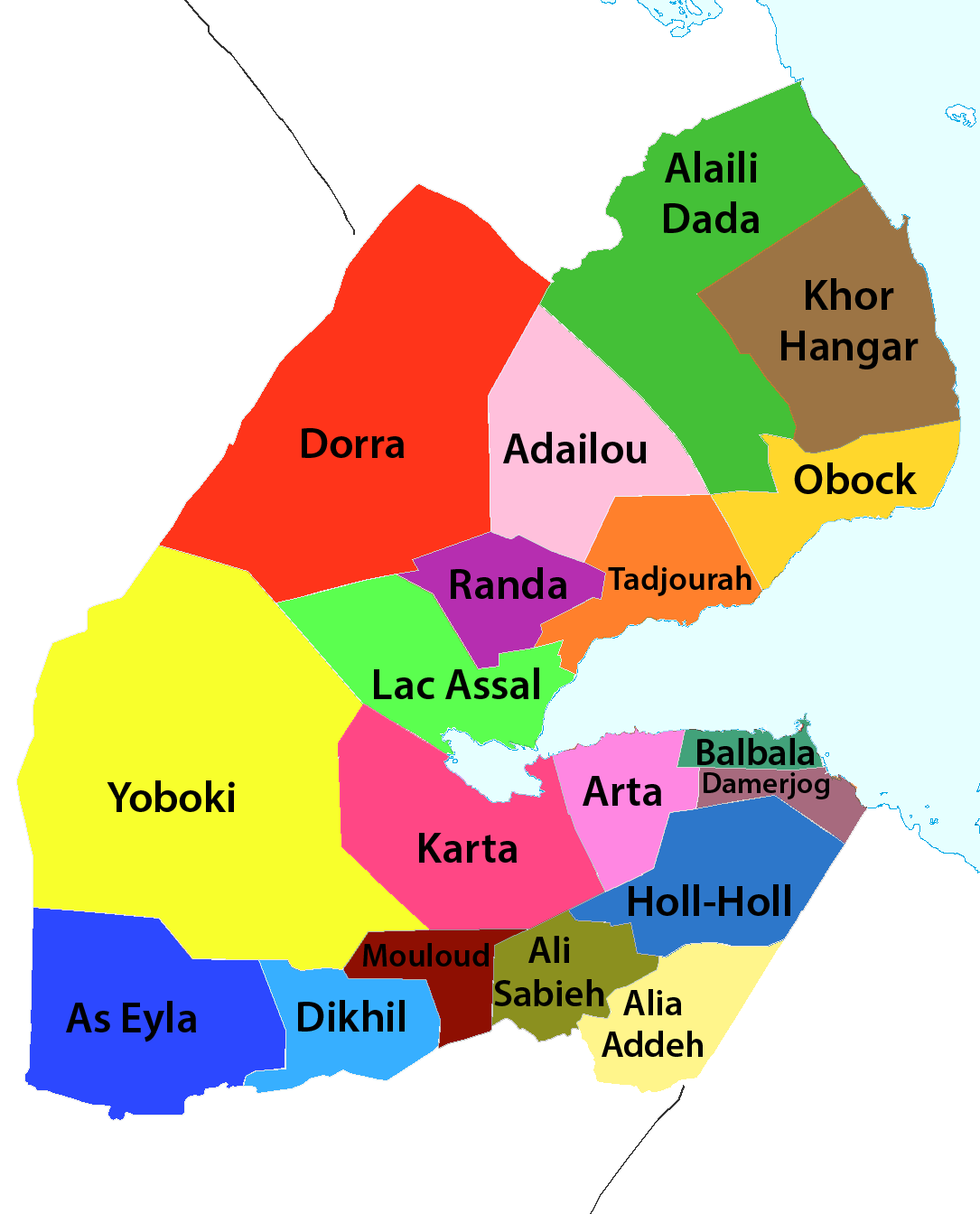

- Location in Central African Republic
- Country: Djibouti

Population (2024)
  - Total: 5,171

Lac 'Assal is an administrative sub-prefecture in Djibouti. The largest settlement is Sagallo.

== See also ==
- Sub-prefectures of Djibouti
