= ʽAdaylou (district) =

`Adaylou
- Administrative sub-prefecture
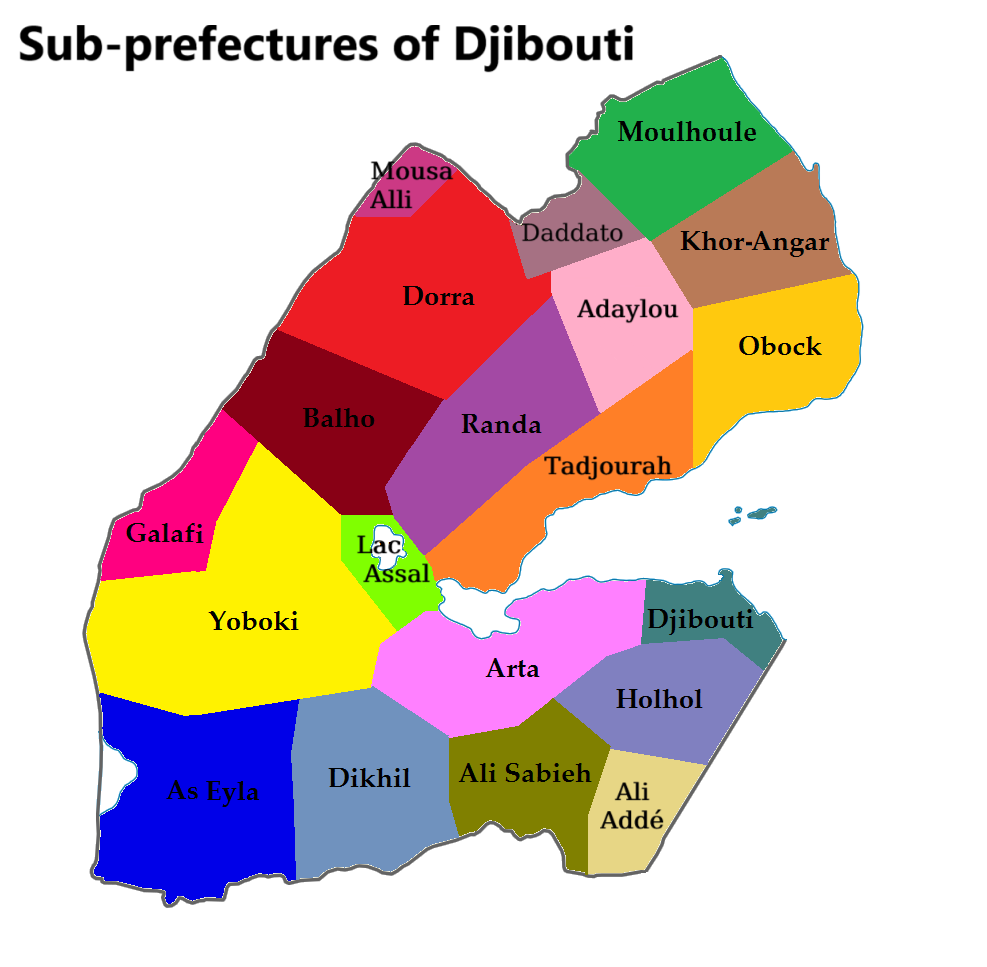

- Location in Djibouti
- Coordinates: 11°57′37″N 42°44′37″E
- Country: Djibouti
- Region: Tadjourah Region

`Adaylou is an Administrative sub-prefecture in Djibouti.

== See also ==
- Sub-prefectures of Djibouti
