= Moucha Island =

Coral island off the coast of Djibouti

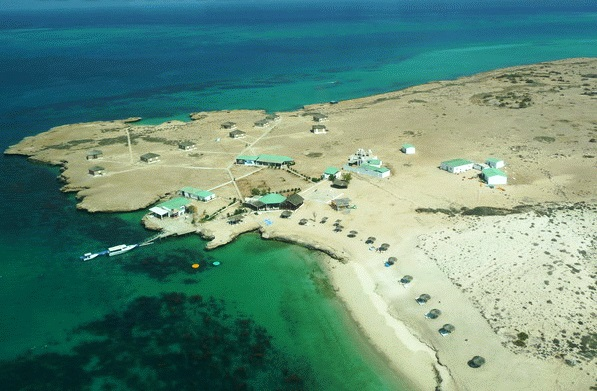

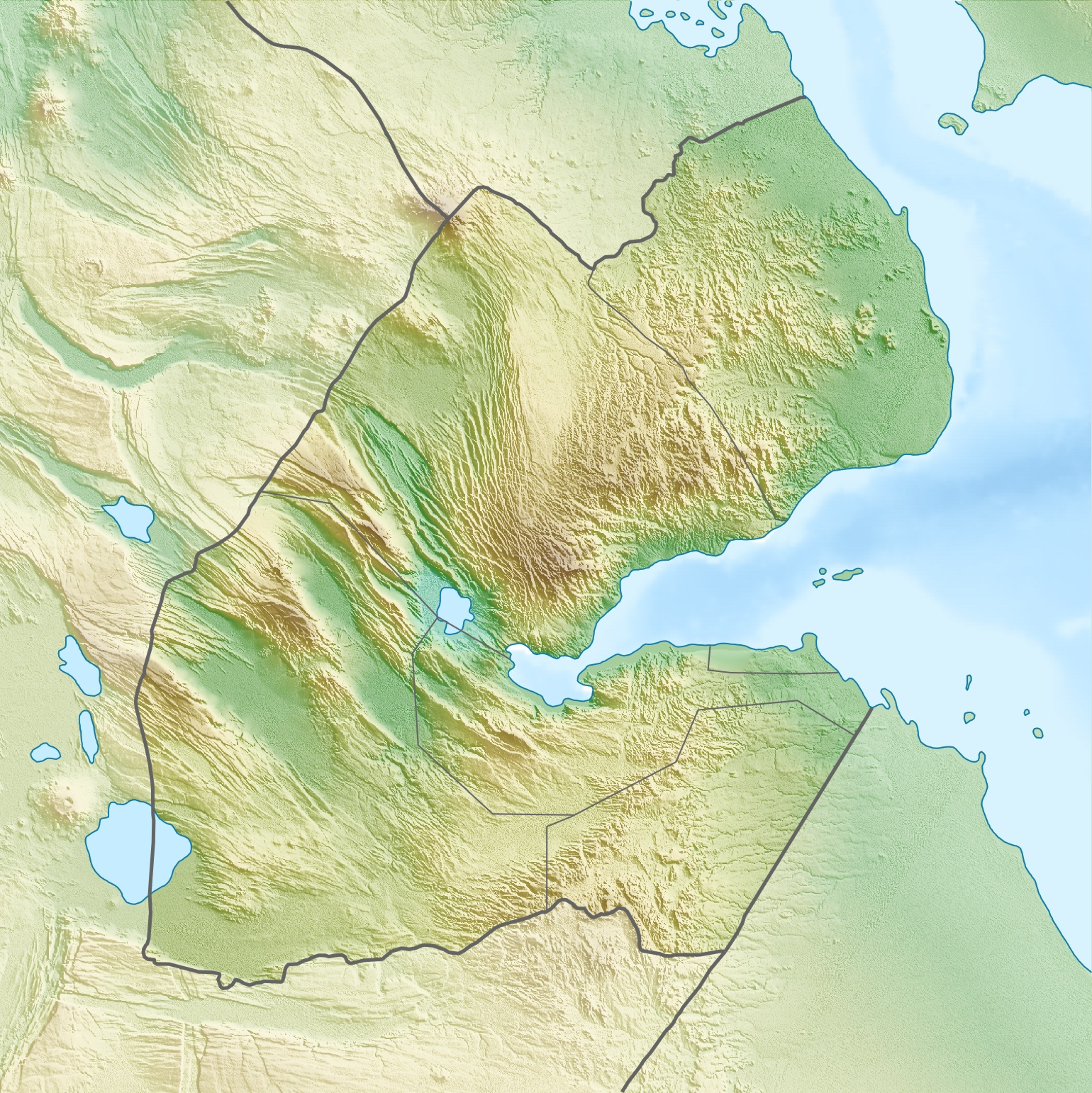
- Location within Djibouti

Geography
- Location: Gulf of Tadjoura
- Coordinates: 11°43′N 43°11′E
- Area: 3.994 km^{2} (1.542 sq mi)
- Length: 1.6 km (0.99 mi)
- Width: 2.41 km (1.498 mi)
- Highest elevation: 13 m (43 ft)

Administration
- Djibouti

Moucha Island is a small coral island off the coast of Djibouti. It is located at the center of the Gulf of Tadjoura. The island is part of the Djibouti Region; the island has a total population of about 20 inhabitants, which increases considerably during the summer.

The island was occupied by Great Britain from 1840 to 1887.

== History ==
In August 1840, the conclusion of a treaty of friendship and commerce between the Sultan Mohammed bin Mohammed of Tadjoura and Commander Robert Moresby of the Indian Navy describes the sale of Moucha Island to Great Britain for ten sacks of rice. The sale is, however, contingent upon occupation. In 1887, Britain ceded sovereignty of the island to France while recognizing the French sphere of influence in the Gulf of Tadjoura, in exchange for the abandonment by France of any right in Zeila and the neighboring Sa'ad ad-Din Islands.

In 1900, a quarantine station was built to accommodate persons in health quarantine, but it was ultimately not used for lack of available medical personnel.

The islands were used by Henry de Monfreid in 1914 as a weapons cache to try to sell smuggled arms. After the deposit was discovered, a "detachment indigenous guards" was installed on the island and occupancy restricted. This monitoring station was removed in May 1915.

== Physical geography ==
Moucha Island is the largest island in Djibouti. Less than 3 km long, Moucha Island's mainland is surrounded by the smaller Maskali Islands, a few islets and a coral reef. It lies approximately 15 kilometres (9 miles) south of the Djibouti's mainland

=== Climate ===
It enjoys significantly more sunny days and high temperatures throughout the year. Featuring an arid climate (Köppen: BWh), temperatures range from very warm during the months of December, January and February, to extremely hot in July. There are two seasons: a summer dry season from May to October and a relatively cool season from November to April (winter).

Climate data for Moucha Island
Month	Jan	Feb	Mar	Apr	May	Jun	Jul	Aug	Sep	Oct	Nov	Dec	Year
Mean daily maximum °C (°F)	29.3 (84.7)	29.8 (85.6)	31.4 (88.5)	33.2 (91.8)	35.8 (96.4)	38.2 (100.8)	39.9 (103.8)	39.1 (102.4)	37.0 (98.6)	34.4 (93.9)	31.8 (89.2)	30.0 (86.0)	34.2 (93.5)
Mean daily minimum °C (°F)	22.2 (72.0)	23.4 (74.1)	24.4 (75.9)	25.8 (78.4)	27.9 (82.2)	30.0 (86.0)	30.0 (86.0)	29.4 (84.9)	29.5 (85.1)	26.5 (79.7)	24.4 (75.9)	23.1 (73.6)	26.4 (79.5)
Average rainfall mm (inches)	5 (0.2)	9 (0.4)	19 (0.7)	14 (0.6)	8 (0.3)	0 (0)	0 (0)	6 (0.2)	11 (0.4)	10 (0.4)	7 (0.3)	6 (0.2)	95 (3.7)
Source: Climate-Data

=== Gallery of photos ===
Moucha Island
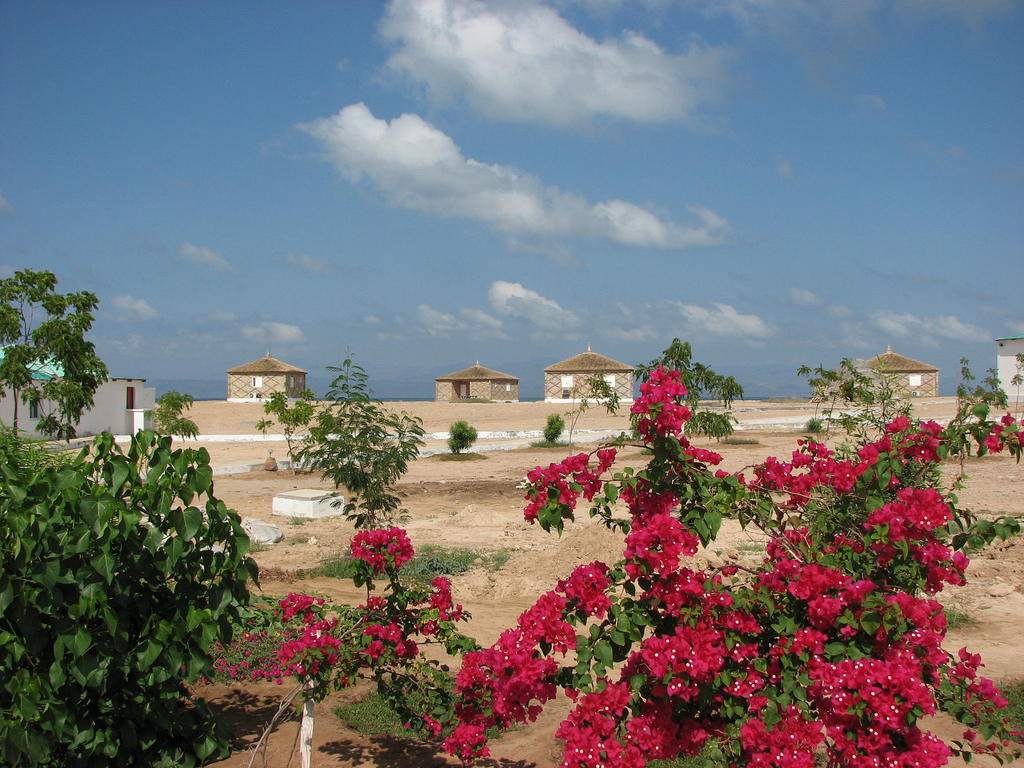
View on the Moucha Island

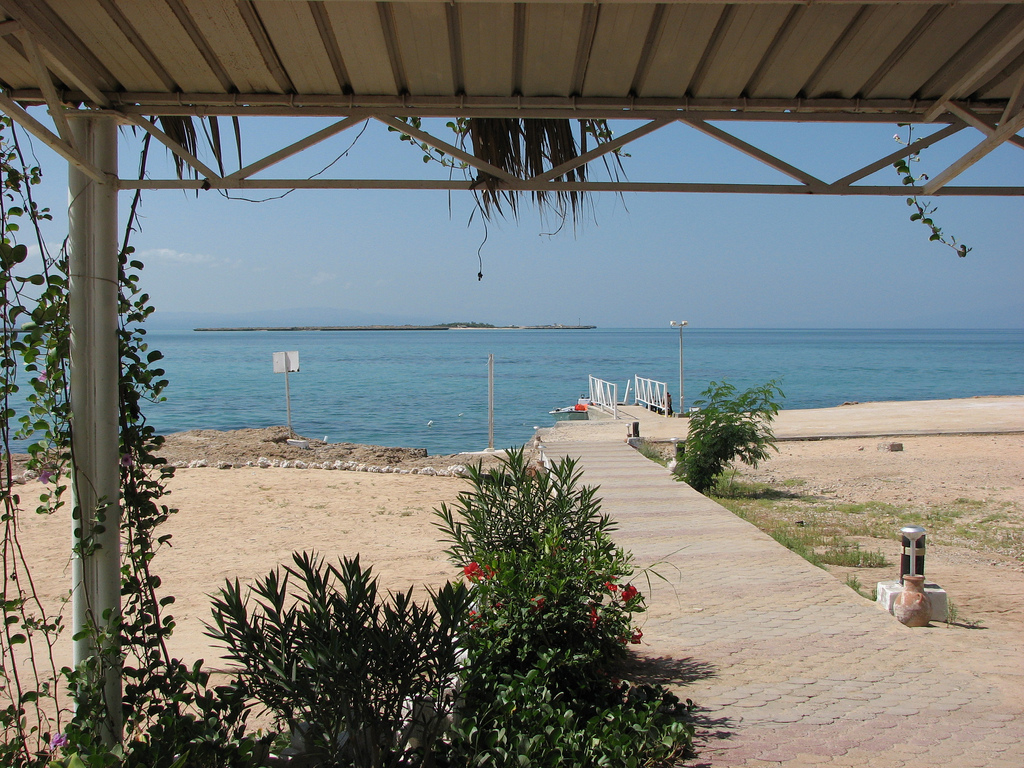
Beach View

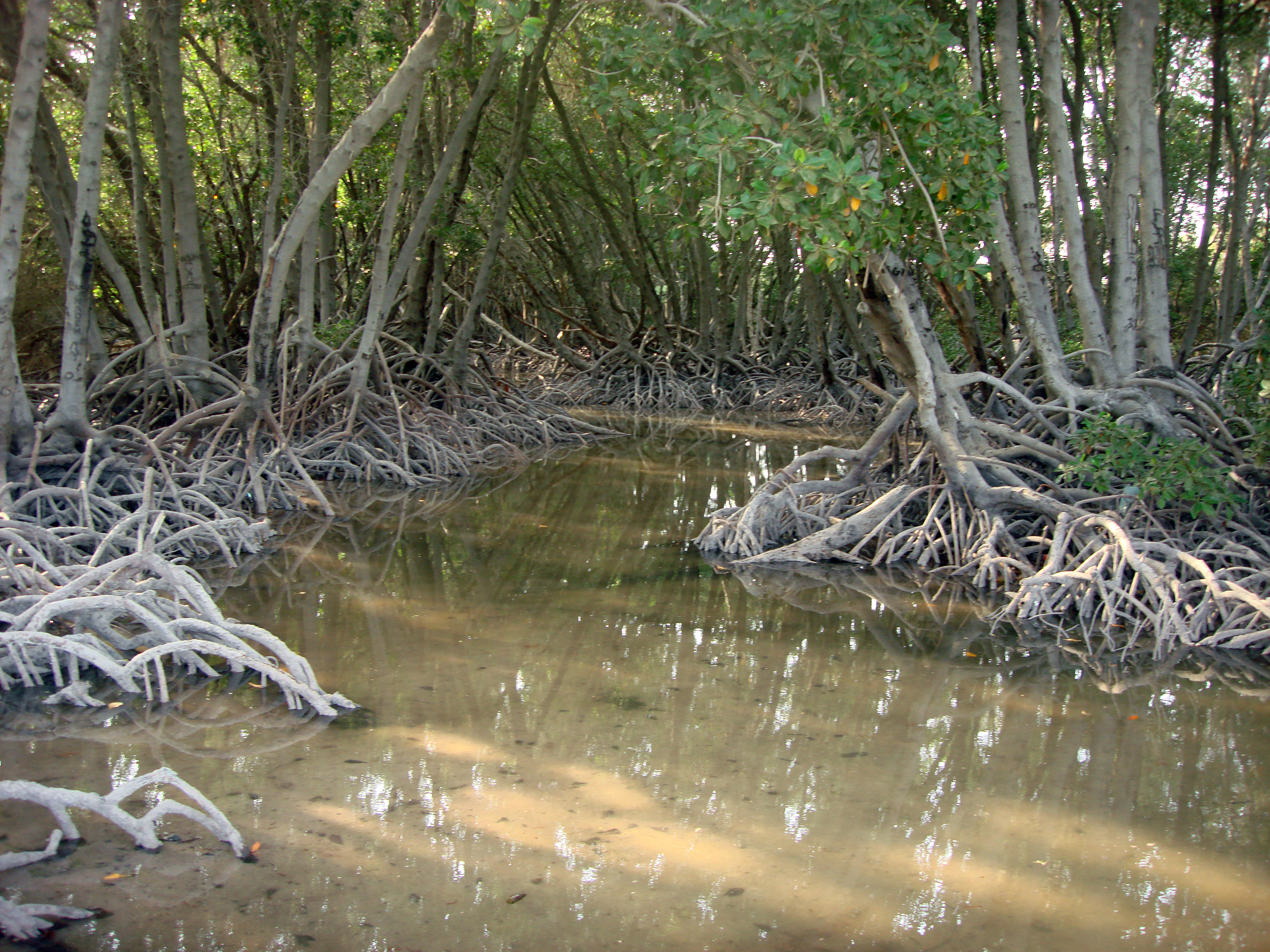
The mangrove swamp of Moucha

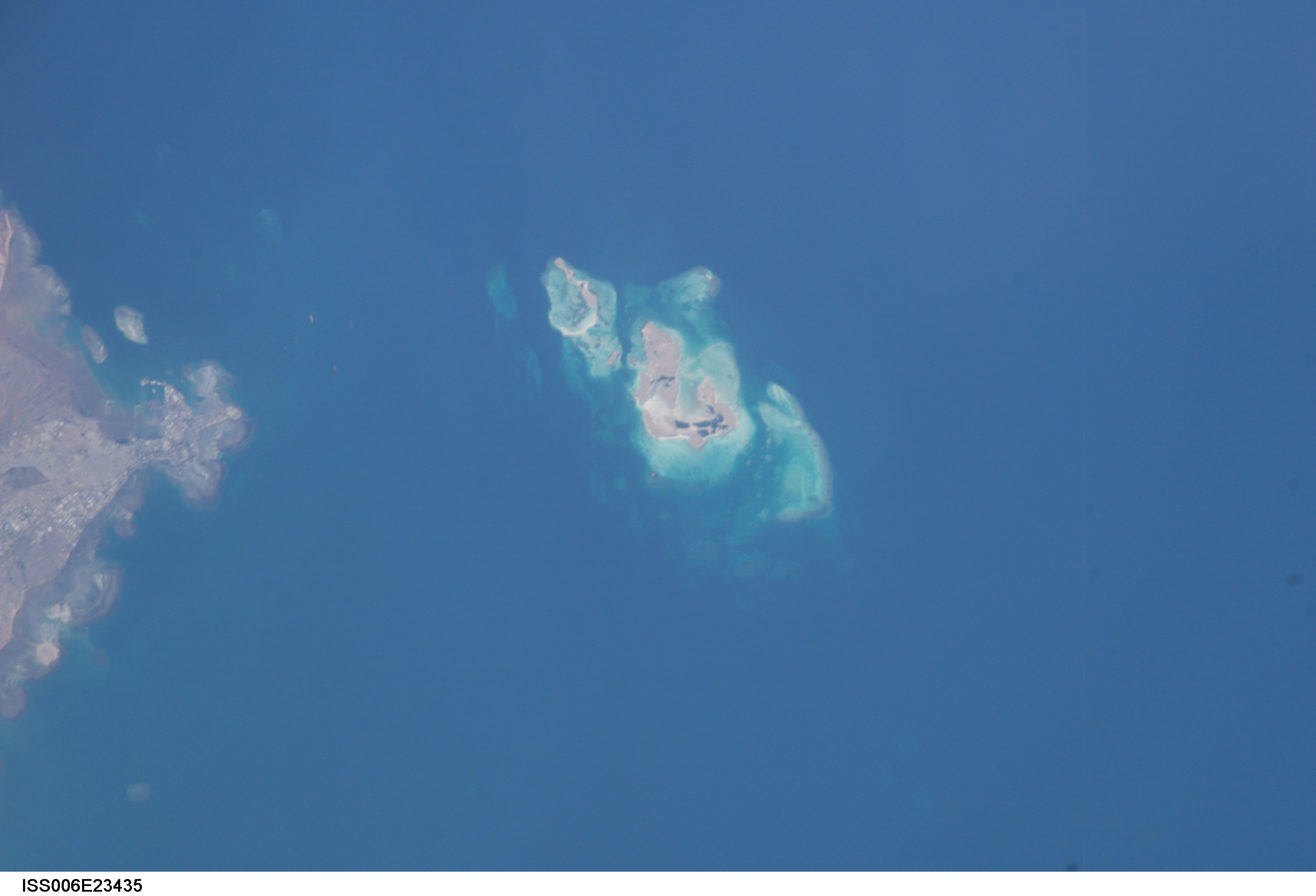
Satellite photo

== Economy ==
The economy of Moucha is predominantly based on services and tourism. Moucha Island is one of the popular holiday destinations in Djibouti. Musha, the main city on the island, is served by the Moucha Airport. All of these islands, sometimes collectively referred to as Moucha Islands, are well-known diving sites.
