= Ali Adde (district) =

- Administrative sub-prefecture
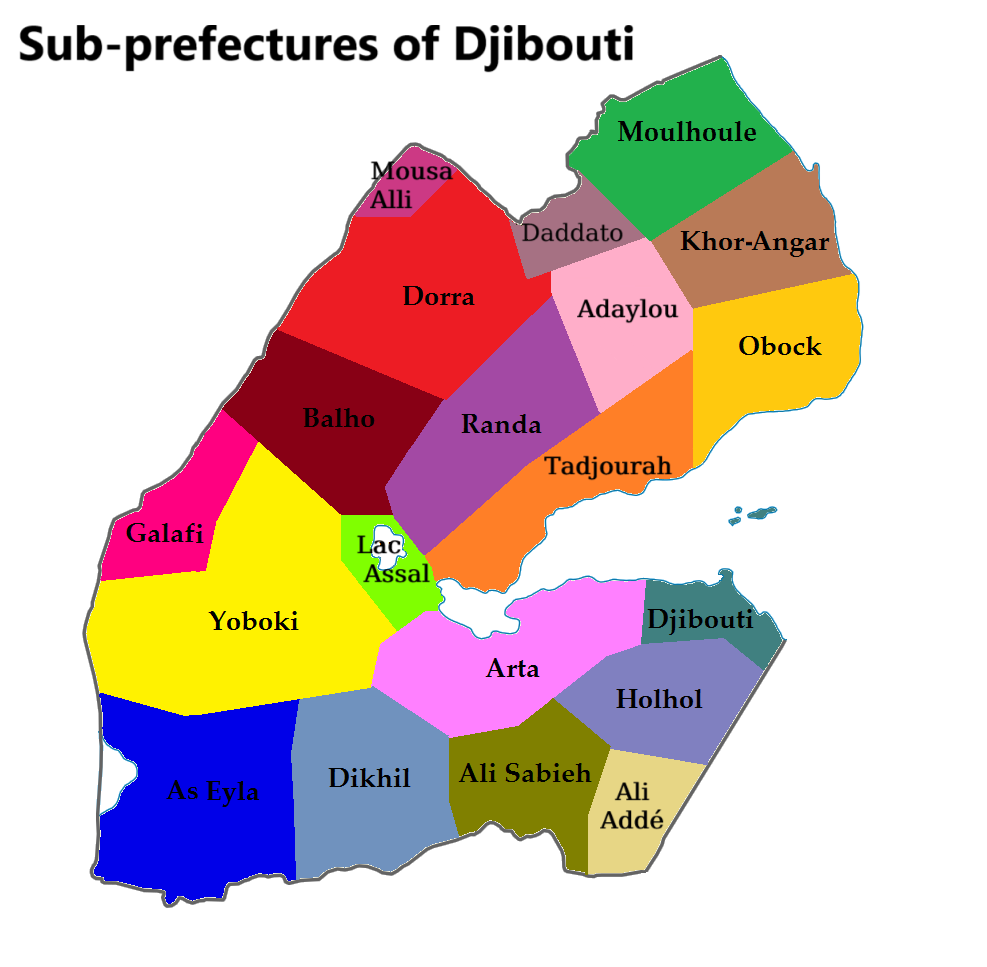
- Country: Djibouti
- Region: Ali Sabieh Region

Ali Adde is an Administrative sub-prefecture in the Ali Sabieh Region of Djibouti.

== See also ==
- Sub-prefectures of Djibouti
