= Moucha Airport =

Airport in Djibouti

- IATA: MHI; ICAO: HDMO

Summary
- Airport type: Public
- Serves: Musha
- Coordinates: 11°43′N 43°12′E

Map
- Location of Moucha Airport

Moucha Airport (IATA: MHI, ICAO: HDMO) is an airport serving Moucha Island in Djibouti.

The status of this airport is unclear, as no records or photos of its existence can be found.
