= As Eyla (district) =

- Administrative sub-prefecture
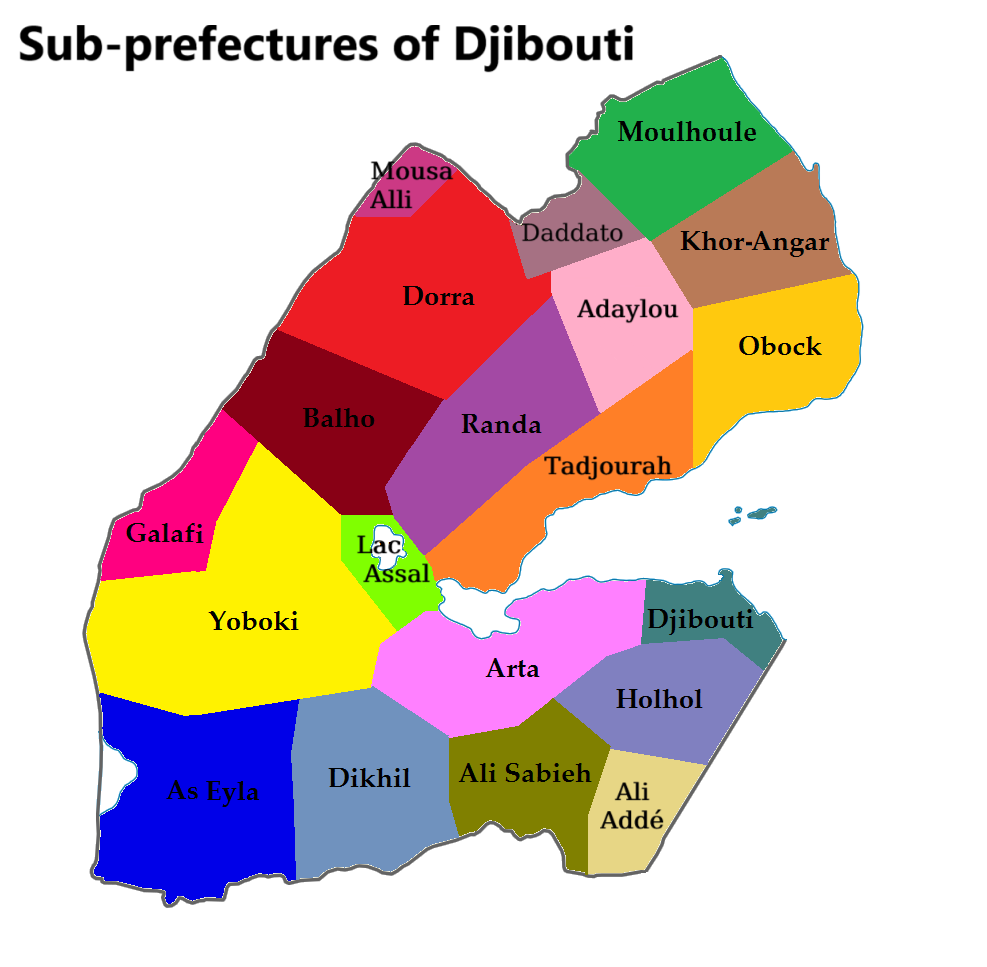

- Location in Djibouti
- Coordinates: 11°01′N 42°07′E
- Country: Djibouti
- Region: Dikhil Region

As Eyla is an Administrative sub-prefecture in Djibouti.

== See also ==
- Sub-prefectures of Djibouti
