= Yoboki (district) =

- Administrative sub-prefecture
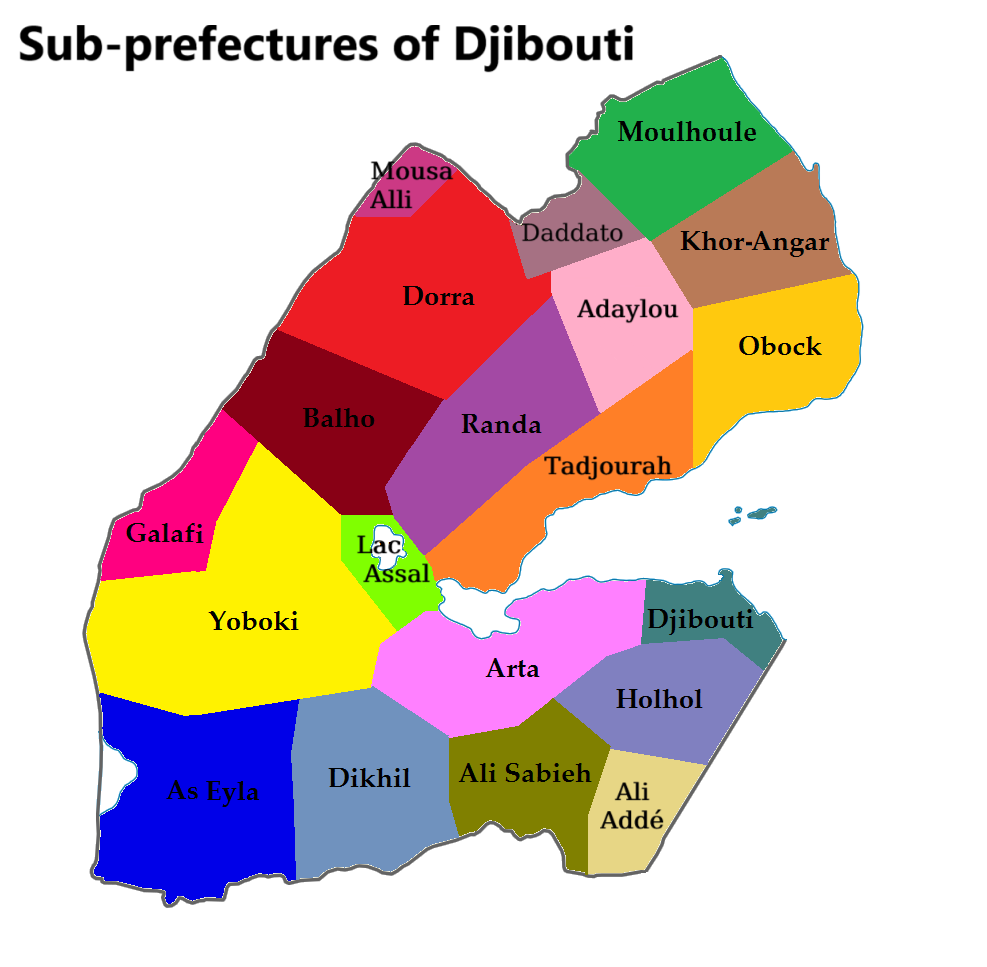

- Location in Central African Republic
- Country: Djibouti
- Region: Dikhil Region

Yoboki is an Administrative sub-prefecture in Djibouti.

== See also ==
- Sub-prefectures of Djibouti
