= Moulhoule (district) =

- Administrative sub-prefecture
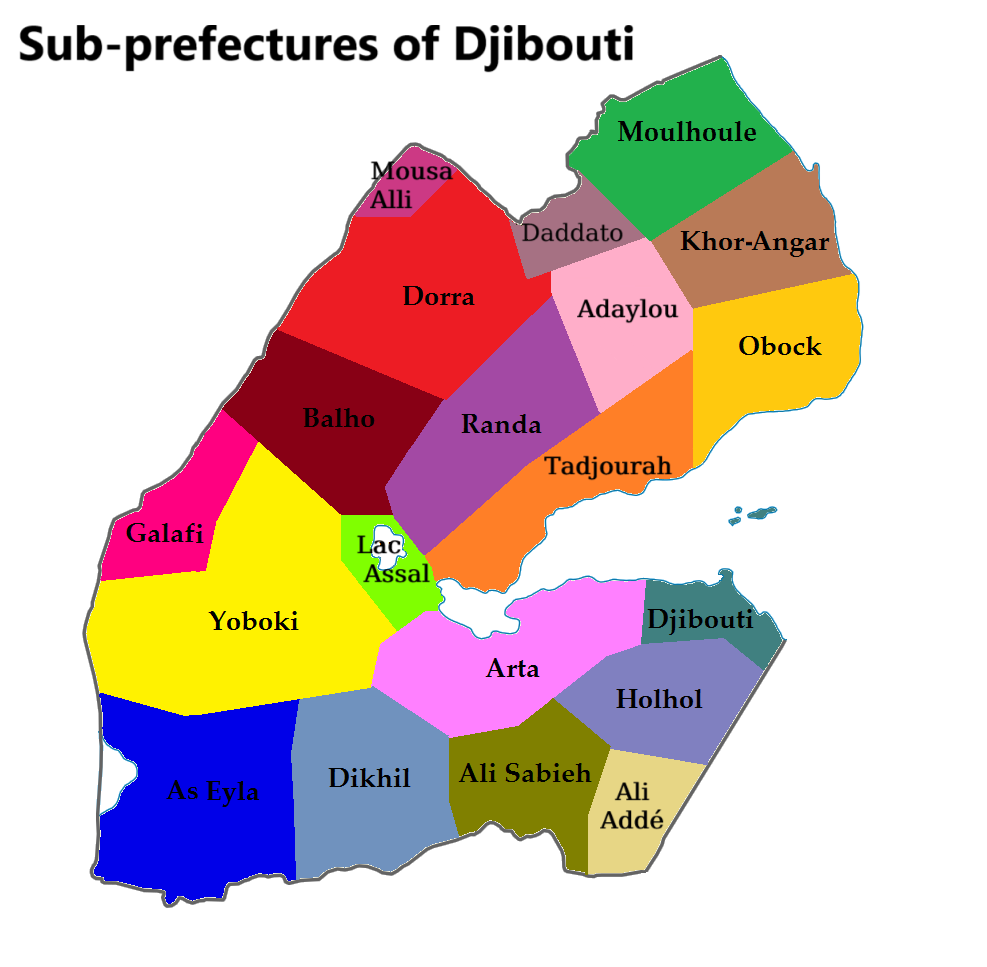
- Country: Djibouti
- Region: Obock Region

Moulhoule is an Administrative sub-prefecture in the Obock Region of Djibouti.

== See also ==
- Sub-prefectures of Djibouti
