= Sub-prefectures of Djibouti =

Djibouti is divided into five administrative regions and one city. The regions are divided into twenty administrative sub-prefectures.

== Districts ==
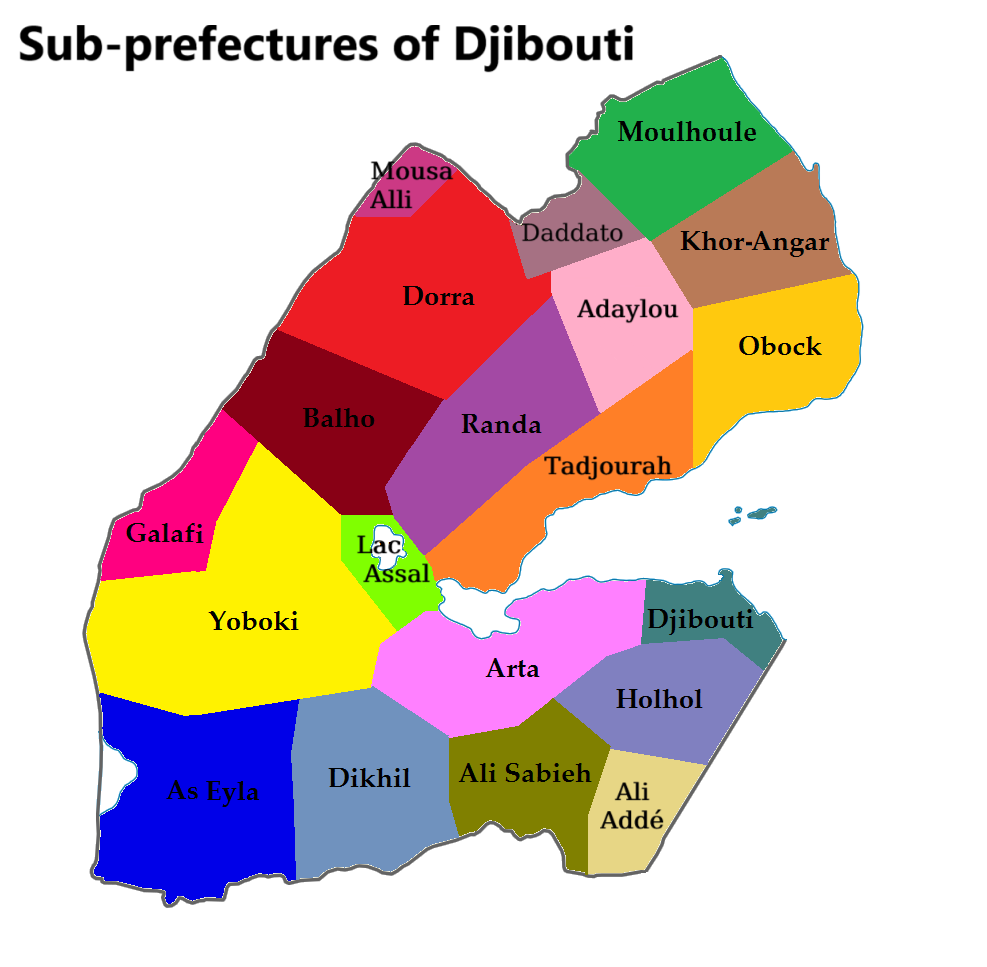
Sub-prefectures of Djibouti

- Adailou sub-prefecture
- Ali Adde sub-prefecture
- Ali Sabieh sub-prefecture
- Arta sub-prefecture
- As Eyla sub-prefecture
- Balho sub-prefecture
- Dadda'to sub-prefecture
- Dikhil sub-prefecture
- Djibouti sub-prefecture
- Dorra sub-prefecture
- Galafi sub-prefecture
- Holhol sub-prefecture
- Khor Angar sub-prefecture
- Lake Asal sub-prefecture
- Moulhoule sub-prefecture
- Mousa Ali sub-prefecture
- Obock sub-prefecture
- Randa sub-prefecture
- Tadjoura sub-prefecture
- Yoboki sub-prefecture
