= Maskali Islands =

Islands in Djibouti

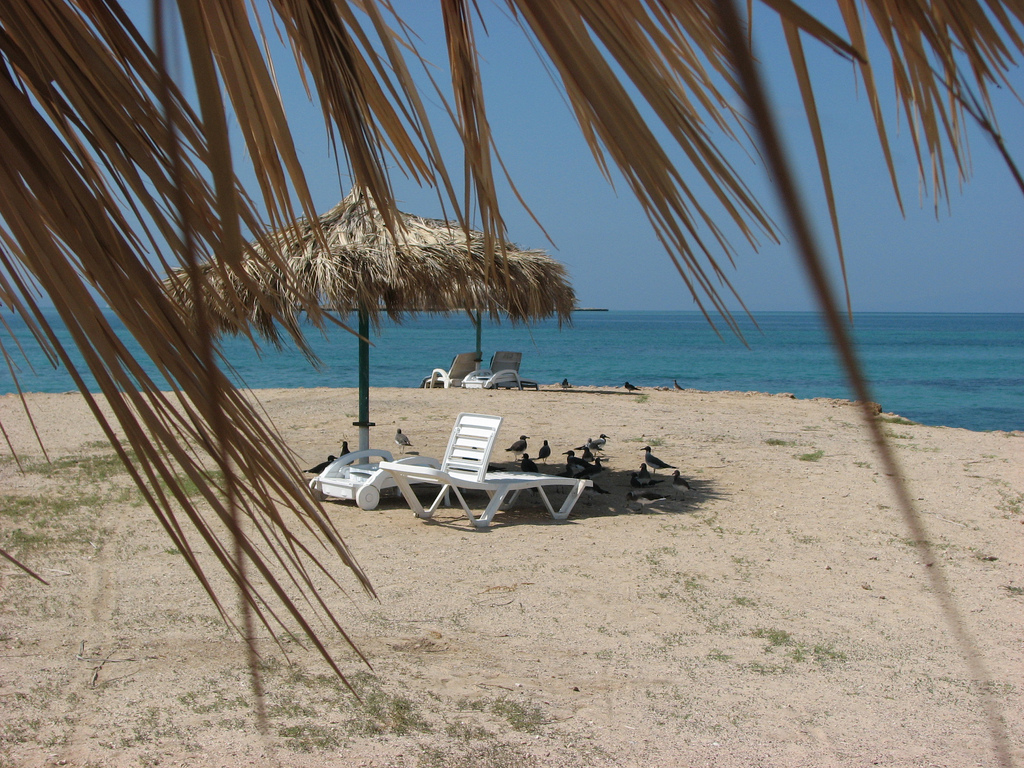
- Interactive map of Maskali Islands

Geography
- Location: Gulf of Tadjoura
- Coordinates: 11.70914°N 43.16459°E
- Area: 2 km^{2} (0.77 sq mi)
- Length: 1.73 km (1.075 mi)
- Width: 0.28 km (0.174 mi)
- Highest elevation: 2 m (7 ft)

Administration
- Djibouti

The Maskali Islands are located off the coast of Djibouti in the Gulf of Tadjoura. The islands are part of the Djibouti Region.
