= Loyada =

Loyada Lowyacadde لويعدا
- Town
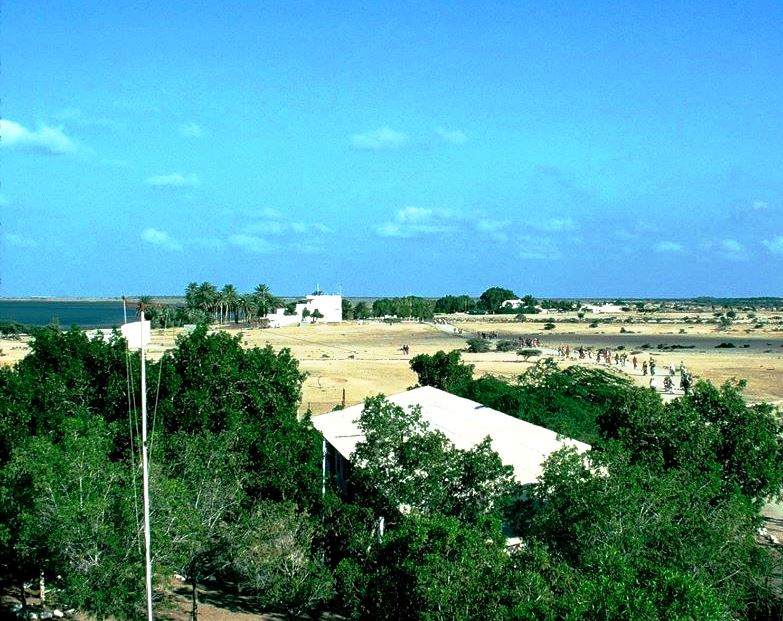
- View of the border crossing in 1982

- Location in Djibouti
- Coordinates: 11°28′00″N 43°14′45″E
- Country: Djibouti
- Region: Arta
- Elevation: 10 m (33 ft)

Population (2019)
  - Total: 1,367

Loyada is a small town in Djibouti. Located in the Arta Region, it is the only official border crossing from Djibouti into Somaliland. It is situated on the west coast of Gulf of Aden, 25 kilometres (16 mi) from the capital, Djibouti.

== Etymology ==
The name of the town derives from Afar Lē-ʿádu or Lē-ʿadó, which means "white watering-place" and in Somali became Loowyaʿádde, "with white calves", by cacography. The French colonial authorities wrote it "Loyada"; the standard Somali spelling is "Lawya caddo".

== History and politics ==
Historical affiliations
Kingdom of Adal Late 9th c. – 13th c.
Ifat Sultanate 1285–1415
Adal Sultanate 1415–1577
Egypt Eyalet 1554–1882
(France) French Somaliland 1883–1967
(France) French Territory of the Afars and the Issas 1967–1977
Djibouti 1977–present

The village stood on a low hill overlooking the shoreline. The water was supplied from a well in the western part of the village. During antiquity Loyada was part of the city-states that in engaged in a lucrative trade network connecting the merchants with Phoenicia, Ptolemaic Egypt, Greece, Parthian Persia, Saba, Nabataea, and the Roman Empire.

Between Djibouti City and Loyada are a number of anthropomorphic and phallic stelae. The structures are associated with graves of rectangular shape flanked by vertical slabs. The Djibouti-Loyada stelae are of uncertain age, and some of them are adorned with a T-shaped symbol. During the Middle Ages, the Djibouti area including Loyada was part of the Adal and Ifat Sultanates.

In 1888, the colonial powers drew the border between British Somaliland and French Djibouti from Loyada south to Jaldessa.

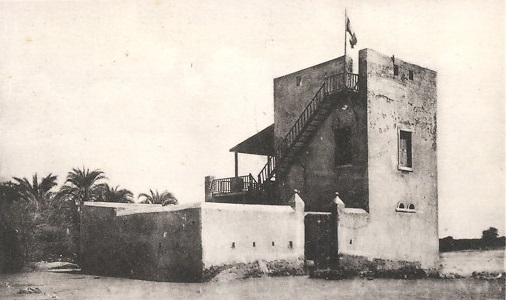
Loyada fort occupied by Italian troops in 1940

In August 1940 Loyada was occupied by the Italians, who remained in its fort for some months.

On 3 February 1976, insurgents of the Somali-backed FLCS armed with StG-44s and a MG42 hijacked a bus carrying 31 French children in Djibouti City and drove it to Loyada. France sent legionnaires and gendarmes from the GIGN and the hostages were rescued the following day under covering fire from Somali border troops, but two children were killed and five wounded.

In the early 1990s, like much of Djibouti, the area was subject to conflict. Rebels took the town and were driven out by government forces, but on 5 May 1990 the Somali National Movement (SNM) attacked Loyada and killed a number of Somali National Army (SNA) people. The event, took place while negotiations between the Djibouti and Somali governments was taking place, and the Somali government protested to the Djibouti Ministry of Foreign Affairs, blaming the Djibouti government for the incident.

The town is currently the only official border crossing between Djibouti and Somaliland. Beginning late in 1999, Djibouti and Somaliland closed the border crossing several times for political reasons. In 2002, after Dahir Riyale Kahin became president of Somaliland, they agreed to reopen it. The UNHCR has established a centre for the assistance of Somali refugees at Loyada.

== Climate ==
The average annual temperature in Loyada is 30 °C. About 163 mm of precipitation falls annually. The warmest month of the year is July with an average temperature of 36 °C. In January, the average temperature is 25.5 °C. It is the lowest average temperature of the whole year. The largest cities most proximate to Loyada are Djibouti City (25 km), Zeila (36 km) and Berbera (289 km).

Climate data for Loyada
Month	Jan	Feb	Mar	Apr	May	Jun	Jul	Aug	Sep	Oct	Nov	Dec	Year
Mean daily maximum °C (°F)	28.8 (83.8)	28.8 (83.8)	30.5 (86.9)	32.3 (90.1)	34.3 (93.7)	37.9 (100.2)	40.5 (104.9)	39.9 (103.8)	36.3 (97.3)	33.3 (91.9)	31.0 (87.8)	29.4 (84.9)	33.6 (92.4)
Mean daily minimum °C (°F)	20.5 (68.9)	23.3 (73.9)	24.5 (76.1)	25.9 (78.6)	27.6 (81.7)	30.1 (86.2)	30.7 (87.3)	29.7 (85.5)	29.7 (85.5)	26.3 (79.3)	24.3 (75.7)	21.0 (69.8)	26.1 (79.0)
Average rainfall mm (inches)	9 (0.4)	16 (0.6)	19 (0.7)	20 (0.8)	17 (0.7)	0 (0)	8 (0.3)	4 (0.2)	4 (0.2)	22 (0.9)	33 (1.3)	11 (0.4)	163 (6.5)
Source 1: Climate-Data.org, altitude: 6m
Source 2: Levoyageur

== Demographics ==
As of 2019, the population of Loyada has been estimated to be 1,367. The town's inhabitants belong to various mainly Afro-Asiatic-speaking ethnic groups, with the Gadabursi Somali predominant.
