= List of cities in Djibouti =

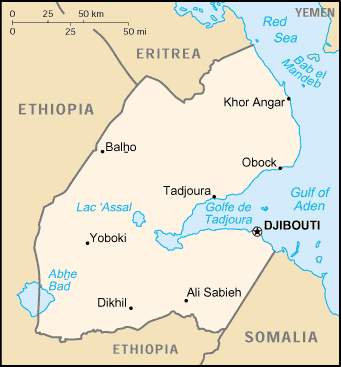
Map of Djibouti

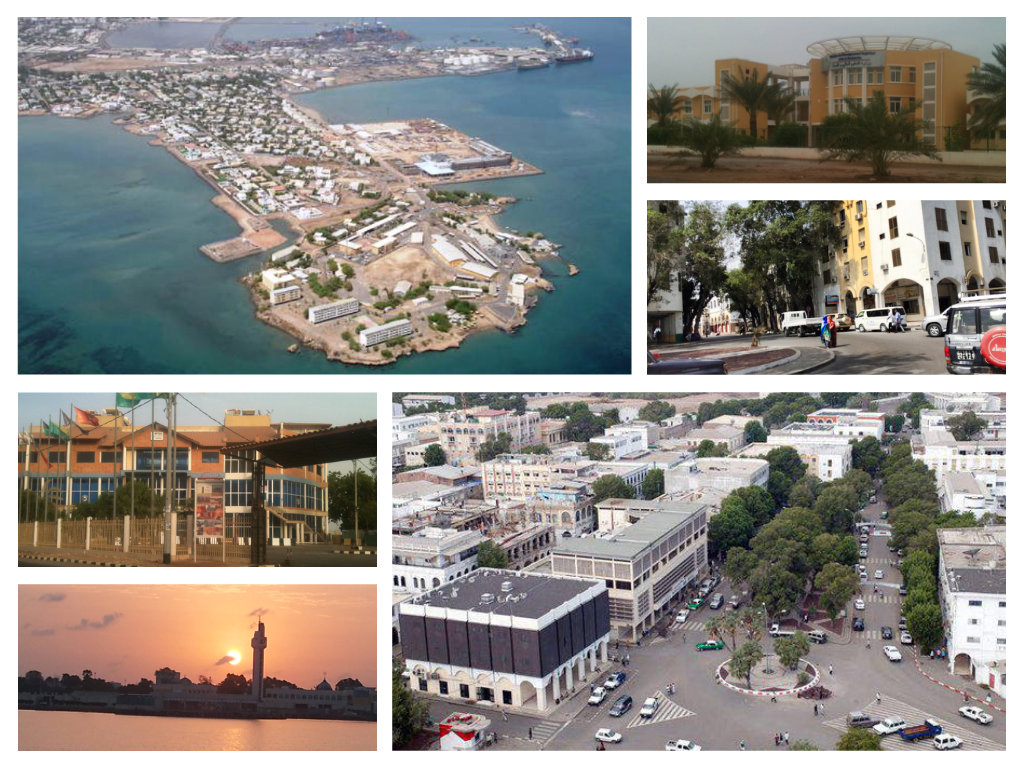
Djibouti, the national capital

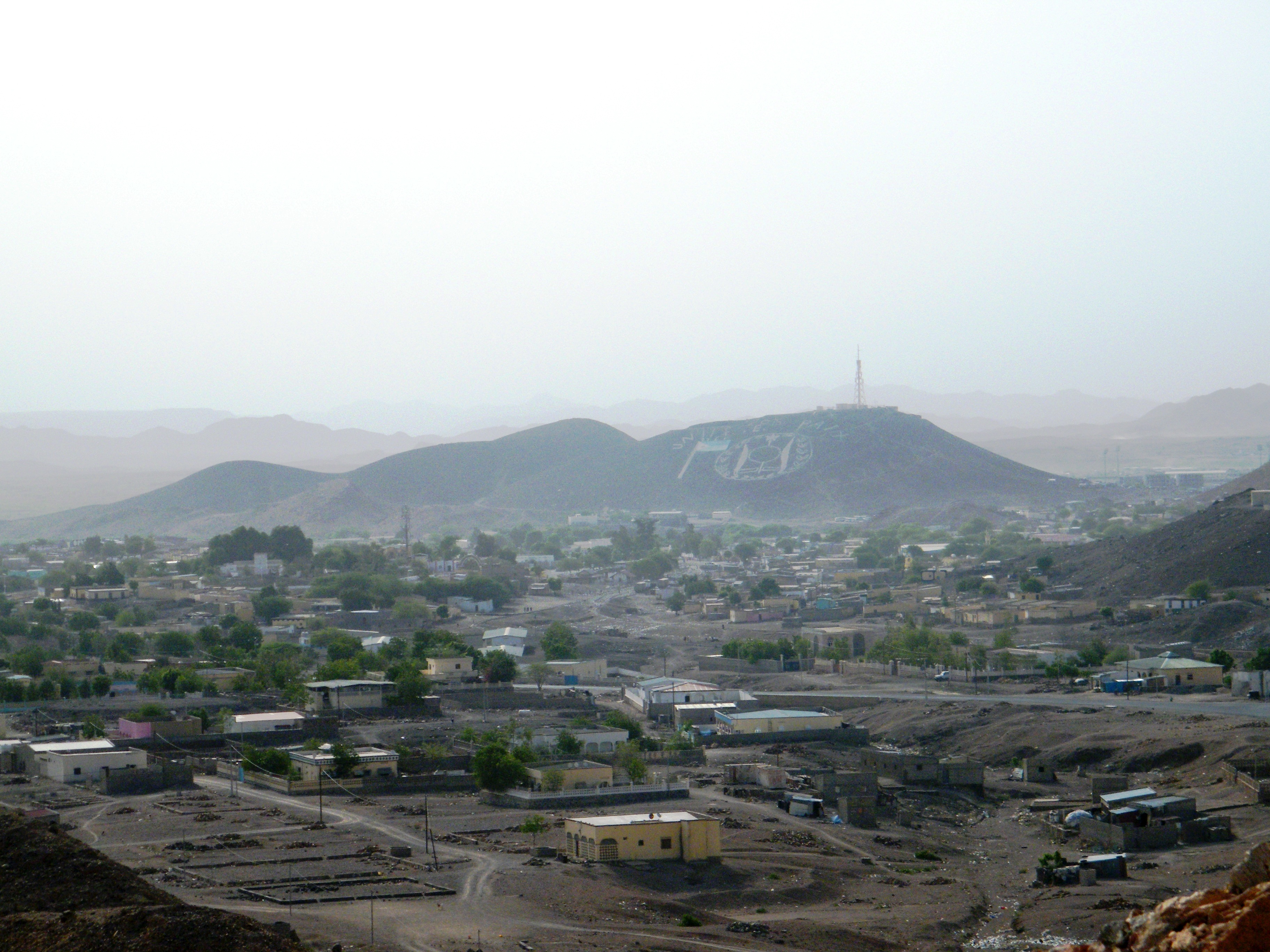
Ali Sabieh

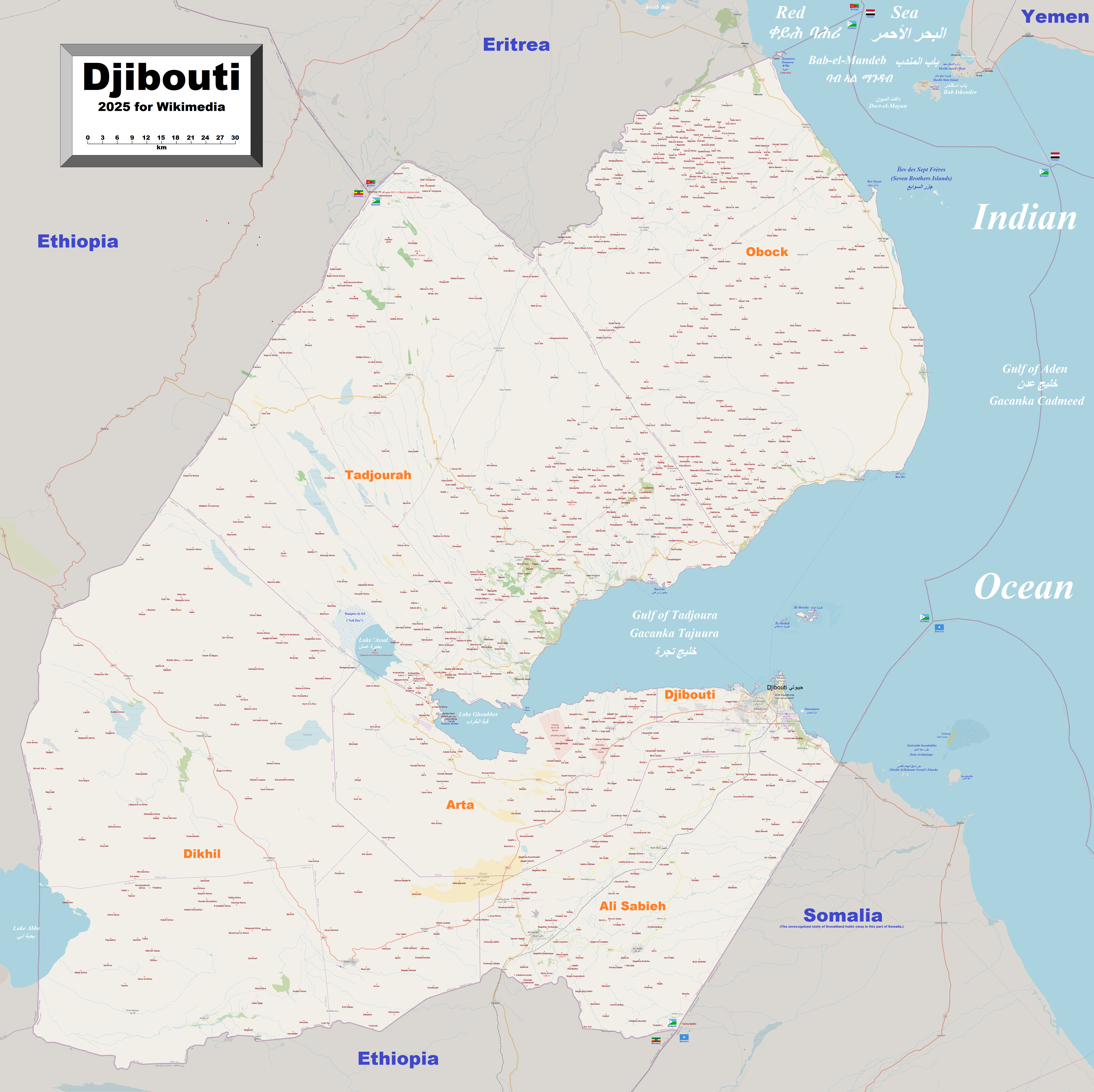
Detailed map of Djibouti

This is a list of localities in Djibouti. In the 2024 census, there are 6 cities and 937 localities.

== List ==
Place	Status	Population 2024 Census	Region
Aba'a Af	Locality	5	Dikhil
Aba'a Daba	Locality	49	Dikhil
Abaa'a-Amo	Locality	65	Dikhil
Abaa'a-Amo	Locality	56	Dikhil
Abaadige	Locality	74	Tadjourah
Abahloyta	Locality	162	Tadjourah
Abaiti-Af	Locality	59	Dikhil
Abaitou	Locality	244	Dikhil
Abaitou	Locality	52	Dikhil
Abayllou	Locality	96	Tadjourah
Abdo Lamgare	Locality	41	Dikhil
Ableh-Af	Locality	264	Tadjourah
Ableh-Randa	Locality	138	Tadjourah
Abletim	Locality	42	Tadjourah
Ablissa	Locality	181	Tadjourah
Abou-Youssouf	Locality	181	Dikhil
Abramali	Locality	27	Obock
Ad-Bouya	Locality	216	Tadjourah
Ad-Hela	Locality	57	Obock
Ad'eyla	Locality	20	Dikhil
Ada Koma	Locality	95	Arta
Ada-Mango	Locality	32	Dikhil
Adaali/Forage	Locality	571	Tadjourah
Adabi	Locality	49	Tadjourah
Adaitou	Locality	5	Obock
Adan Gali	Locality	66	Dikhil
Adatleli	Locality	29	Dikhil
Adayla	Locality	141	Tadjourah
Adayllou	Locality	791	Tadjourah
Adaytoli	Locality	52	Tadjourah
Adaytou	Locality	9	Tadjourah
Adaytou Libouyi	Locality	2	Dikhil
Add	Locality	67	Arta
Adgueno	Locality	2,247	Obock
Adkabara	Locality	132	Dikhil
Adleh	Locality	68	Dikhil
Ado Daba	Locality	39	Dikhil
Ado-Bouyi	Locality	36	Dikhil
Ado-Daaba	Locality	123	Tadjourah
Ado-Daba	Locality	47	Obock
Ado-Daba	Locality	15	Tadjourah
Ado-Dali	Locality	86	Dikhil
Ado'ela	Locality	10	Dikhil
Adokoma	Locality	17	Obock
Adolayi	Locality	60	Tadjourah
Af-Asse	Locality	29	Dikhil
Af-Asse	Locality	32	Dikhil
Af-Dheg Ween	Locality	222	Ali Sabieh
Afah-Daba	Locality	50	Tadjourah
Afahtou	Locality	271	Dikhil
Afareh	Locality	29	Tadjourah
Affay	Locality	10	Tadjourah
Afka Goro Dableh	Locality	98	Arta
Afka-Arba'a	Locality	61	Dikhil
Ag-Le	Locality	49	Obock
Aga Dhereh	Locality	17	Arta
Agaa	Locality	51	Obock
Agaa	Locality	59	Obock
Agaa 2 (As-Rasou)	Locality	355	Obock
Agogari	Locality	97	Dikhil
Aicha'atou	Locality	33	Dikhil
Aigag	Locality	22	Ali Sabieh
Aitanab	Locality	13	Ali Sabieh
Akirbouri	Locality	118	Dikhil
Al Hougra	Locality	128	Obock
Alal Af	Locality	110	Tadjourah
Alal-Af	Locality	224	Tadjourah
Alalli-Dadda	Locality	463	Obock
Alat-Ela	Locality	60	Obock
Alay Daba	Locality	10	Dikhil
Alayle	Locality	108	Obock
Alayli	Locality	33	Tadjourah
Alaytoli	Locality	147	Tadjourah
Alfim	Locality	11	Obock
Ali Adeh	Locality	12,763	Ali Sabieh
Ali Gona	Locality	84	Ali Sabieh
Ali Guedi	Locality	225	Arta
Ali Omar	Locality	224	Arta
Ali Omar Aoul	Locality	37	Arta
Ali Ouneh	Locality	576	Arta
Ali Sabieh	City	44,928	Ali Sabieh
Aligarab-Af	Locality	61	Tadjourah
Allaleh	Locality	34	Ali Sabieh
Allouli	Locality	138	Dikhil
Allouli	Locality	260	Obock
Alouha-Af	Locality	66	Tadjourah
Aloum-Darwa	Locality	67	Tadjourah
Aloum-Dora	Locality	38	Tadjourah
Aloumbolto	Locality	15	Dikhil
Aloumtak'der Koma	Locality	20	Dikhil
Aloungaba	Locality	20	Dikhil
Alyto-Amo	Locality	21	Tadjourah
Am-Assa	Locality	90	Obock
Amandiglou	Locality	115	Obock
Amati-Bolo	Locality	82	Obock
Amayleh	Locality	12	Dikhil
Amaylou	Locality	63	Tadjourah
Ambouktto	Locality	85	Ali Sabieh
Amisso	Locality	12	Tadjourah
Amosina	Locality	34	Tadjourah
Anawali	Locality	125	Obock
Andaba 2/Bouba	Locality	272	Tadjourah
Andabai/Hakareh	Locality	90	Tadjourah
Andale	Locality	118	Tadjourah
Andar-Masguid	Locality	11	Tadjourah
Anderta	Locality	37	Tadjourah
Andoli	Locality	544	Obock
Angaassa	Locality	28	Tadjourah
Angalal-Af	Locality	23	Tadjourah
Angalala	Locality	60	Tadjourah
Anoyta	Locality	35	Obock
Anto	Locality	26	Dikhil
Aouass	Locality	136	Obock
Aour Aoussa	Locality	128	Ali Sabieh
Aous Damerraley	Locality	15	Arta
Ara Madabeh	Locality	19	Ali Sabieh
Arafa	Locality	15	Obock
Arahtou	Locality	121	Obock
Arda-Daba	Locality	96	Obock
Ardikkoba-Afa/Hillou	Locality	220	Tadjourah
Ardoo	Locality	564	Tadjourah
Argido	Locality	56	Tadjourah
Arhoda'ar	Locality	21	Dikhil
Arkeyleh	Locality	14	Obock
Aroule Bahari	Locality	89	Tadjourah
Arraha Biyaleh	Locality	25	Ali Sabieh
Arraha Homan	Locality	62	Ali Sabieh
Arri-Maara	Locality	23	Tadjourah
Arryi	Locality	104	Tadjourah
Arta	City	11,462	Arta
Arta Plage	Locality	18	Arta
Arwo	Locality	197	Dikhil
As-Eyla	Locality	5,176	Dikhil
As-Harar	Locality	43	Obock
As-Hougoub	Locality	36	Obock
Asa-Daaba	Locality	18	Tadjourah
Asa-Gayla	Locality	162	Tadjourah
Asa-Gayla/Fergera-Dabba	Locality	38	Tadjourah
Asa-Gayla/Hagaykalou	Locality	64	Tadjourah
Asa-Kona	Locality	97	Obock
Asaala-Af	Locality	43	Tadjourah
Asara Raqid	Locality	59	Arta
Asbahari	Locality	168	Dikhil
Askala	Locality	139	Dikhil
Asker Koma	Locality	34	Dikhil
Asmadera	Locality	118	Tadjourah
Ass Hougbou	Locality	216	Tadjourah
Ass-Danah	Locality	21	Tadjourah
Ass-Golol	Locality	28	Tadjourah
Ass-Hougouba	Locality	182	Tadjourah
Ass-Louss	Locality	350	Tadjourah
Assa Guoubou	Locality	51	Dikhil
Assa Harka	Locality	60	Obock
Assa Koma	Locality	34	Dikhil
Assa-Boulad	Locality	62	Dikhil
Assa-Daaba	Locality	33	Tadjourah
Assa-Dala	Locality	35	Dikhil
Assa-Dora	Locality	24	Tadjourah
Assa-Faoo	Locality	10	Tadjourah
Assa-Faoo	Locality	61	Tadjourah
Assa-Koma	Locality	59	Dikhil
Assa-Koma	Locality	9	Tadjourah
Assa-Masguid	Locality	97	Dikhil
Assa'dowaha-Affa	Locality	45	Dikhil
Assado	Locality	39	Dikhil
Assal	Locality	158	Tadjourah
Assamo	Locality	629	Ali Sabieh
Assassan	Locality	271	Obock
Assourat	Locality	429	Tadjourah
Atar	Locality	1,168	Arta
Awda	Locality	17	Tadjourah
Awdi-Adaytou	Locality	33	Tadjourah
Awria	Locality	12	Obock
Aygou	Locality	88	Obock
Ayrii	Locality	294	Tadjourah
Aytiy-Asso	Locality	14	Tadjourah
Baba'alou	Locality	4	Dikhil
Badhi Weyn	Locality	90	Ali Sabieh
Badoli-Daba	Locality	8	Dikhil
Badoyta-Ela	Locality	114	Obock
Bagado	Locality	75	Obock
Baginda	Locality	223	Dikhil
Bahoum-Amo	Locality	41	Tadjourah
Bahour	Locality	1,313	Arta
Bakarou	Locality	21	Obock
Bakere	Locality	890	Dikhil
Bala-Alaf	Locality	60	Obock
Balanbaley	Locality	48	Dikhil
Balefita	Locality	5	Dikhil
Balho	Locality	429	Tadjourah
Bankoualeh	Locality	112	Tadjourah
Baradola	Locality	51	Tadjourah
Barage Langobaleh	Locality	12	Arta
Bararee	Locality	15	Obock
Baraslou	Locality	36	Tadjourah
Base Americane	Locality	41	Arta
Batayta	Locality	76	Arta
Bay'ad	Locality	47	Dikhil
Bayi	Locality	32	Obock
Beya Adde	Locality	237	Ali Sabieh
Bidah-Af	Locality	210	Tadjourah
Bidhibileh	Locality	10	Ali Sabieh
Bihidley	Locality	302	Ali Sabieh
Bil Inwein	Locality	90	Arta
Bilcinleh	Locality	2	Ali Sabieh
Bininlev	Locality	33	Ali Sabieh
Bissidiro	Locality	102	Obock
Biyo Asee	Locality	39	Arta
Biyo Khalaf	Locality	123	Ali Sabieh
Boboh-Af	Locality	59	Tadjourah
Bocley	Locality	28	Ali Sabieh
Bod	Locality	150	Arta
Bodogoli	Locality	47	Obock
Bodoli	Locality	55	Dikhil
Boholi	Locality	44	Dikhil
Bolli	Locality	135	Tadjourah
Bolli	Locality	383	Tadjourah
Bondara	Locality	409	Dikhil
Bonta 1	Locality	178	Dikhil
Bonta 2	Locality	240	Dikhil
Boogh	Locality	39	Arta
Boora	Locality	8	Tadjourah
Borsi	Locality	33	Obock
Bossali	Locality	57	Obock
Boudouni	Locality	12	Tadjourah
Bougbougto	Locality	128	Dikhil
Bouhkibo	Locality	9	Tadjourah
Boulboulo	Locality	31	Tadjourah
Boule Homan	Locality	341	Ali Sabieh
Bouleh Weineh	Locality	94	Arta
Boullahi	Locality	17	Tadjourah
Bouraousan	Locality	15	Tadjourah
Bourheita	Locality	93	Tadjourah
Bourhi	Locality	65	Tadjourah
Bouri Hara	Locality	68	Tadjourah
Bourougali	Locality	64	Dikhil
Bourta	Locality	268	Arta
Bouya	Locality	725	Tadjourah
Bouya Af	Locality	202	Dikhil
Bouyi	Locality	74	Tadjourah
Boya-Goma	Locality	90	Dikhil
Cadey Weyn	Locality	6	Ali Sabieh
Calolah	Locality	54	Ali Sabieh
Carurada	Locality	130	Ali Sabieh
Celka Qudka	Locality	51	Ali Sabieh
Chabelley	Locality	187	Arta
Cheik Farah	Locality	5,267	Arta
Cheik-Sabire	Locality	334	Dikhil
Cheikeitti 1	Locality	294	Dikhil
Cheikeitti 2	Locality	934	Dikhil
Cheikeitti Gami	Locality	30	Dikhil
Cheitayto	Locality	89	Dikhil
Ciiro Leh	Locality	124	Ali Sabieh
Daafo	Locality	202	Tadjourah
Daasbio	Locality	305	Ali Sabieh
Daba Ass	Locality	9	Ali Sabieh
Dabah-Af	Locality	60	Tadjourah
Dabah-Af	Locality	182	Tadjourah
Dabeel Weyn	Locality	81	Ali Sabieh
Dabin-Dara	Locality	22	Tadjourah
Dablali	Locality	28	Dikhil
Daboukana	Locality	12	Tadjourah
Dabrima	Locality	114	Tadjourah
Dadahalou	Locality	136	Dikhil
Dadaho	Locality	82	Tadjourah
Dadahto	Locality	315	Tadjourah
Dadale-Kibo	Locality	152	Dikhil
Dadato	Locality	442	Obock
Daddai	Locality	26	Obock
Dafeinaytou	Locality	41	Tadjourah
Dag'addaf	Locality	24	Dikhil
Dagadda	Locality	286	Obock
Dagadle 2	Locality	59	Dikhil
Dagaydo	Locality	270	Obock
Daggoulbou	Locality	21	Tadjourah
Daggouloub-Af	Locality	12	Obock
Daguirou/Araali	Locality	14	Dikhil
Daguirou/Araclou	Locality	28	Dikhil
Daharsi	Locality	178	Tadjourah
Dahnaleh	Locality	24	Obock
Dahno	Locality	330	Obock
Dahogoubou	Locality	20	Dikhil
Dahoto	Locality	50	Dikhil
Daimo	Locality	171	Dikhil
Daka	Locality	208	Obock
Dakotleh	Locality	53	Tadjourah
Dalay-Af	Locality	87	Obock
Dalha/Abaa	Locality	32	Tadjourah
Dalha/Ado-Ale	Locality	17	Tadjourah
Dalha/Amomalel	Locality	21	Tadjourah
Dalha/Foho	Locality	46	Tadjourah
Dalha/Galarima	Locality	0	Tadjourah
Dalha/Ouraytou	Locality	5	Tadjourah
Dalha/Yialy	Locality	26	Tadjourah
Dalhalou-Dada	Locality	58	Obock
Dali	Locality	19	Obock
Dalla	Locality	63	Dikhil
Dalta-Boulad	Locality	150	Dikhil
Damerjog	Locality	5,148	Arta
Damerkaddae	Locality	19	Ali Sabieh
Dandoli	Locality	18	Tadjourah
Dannan	Locality	213	Ali Sabieh
Daoudaouya	Locality	515	Dikhil
Dara-Dara	Locality	10	Dikhil
Dareh	Locality	14	Arta
Darka Abca	Locality	23	Ali Sabieh
Darmala Af	Locality	14	Dikhil
Dat Aba'a	Locality	35	Dikhil
Dat-Hougoub	Locality	113	Tadjourah
Dat-Masguid	Locality	26	Tadjourah
Data Harka	Locality	60	Obock
Data Rouleh	Locality	80	Tadjourah
Dawaa	Locality	114	Tadjourah
Dawana	Locality	25	Dikhil
Dawanou 1	Locality	23	Dikhil
Dawanou 2	Locality	33	Dikhil
Day	Locality	806	Tadjourah
Day/Goubou	Locality	244	Tadjourah
Day/Tikito	Locality	336	Tadjourah
Dayer	Locality	19	Arta
Daymoli	Locality	52	Tadjourah
Daymoli	Locality	92	Tadjourah
Debel	Locality	143	Tadjourah
Debneh	Locality	226	Tadjourah
Debneh/Harka	Locality	35	Tadjourah
Debneh/Harkalah	Locality	22	Tadjourah
Dediya	Locality	50	Dikhil
Delima	Locality	24	Obock
Der-Daba	Locality	17	Tadjourah
Der-Kousra	Locality	82	Tadjourah
Deressi	Locality	57	Tadjourah
Dhagah Datey	Locality	24	Ali Sabieh
Dhan Karoneh	Locality	29	Ali Sabieh
Dhaqah Damer	Locality	13	Arta
Dhaqax Dhalole	Locality	26	Ali Sabieh
Dheg Ween	Locality	402	Ali Sabieh
Dhouseyeh	Locality	56	Ali Sabieh
Dhu Yar	Locality	76	Ali Sabieh
Dibawley	Locality	30	Ali Sabieh
Didaleli-Af	Locality	54	Dikhil
Dihayteh	Locality	3	Ali Sabieh
Dikalou	Locality	18	Obock
Dikhil	City	27,722	Dikhil
Dikri	Locality	125	Ali Sabieh
Dimilo Koma	Locality	27	Dikhil
Dimoli	Locality	161	Dikhil
Dimomali Koma	Locality	146	Dikhil
Dinamali	Locality	69	Dikhil
Dinbio-Koma	Locality	31	Tadjourah
Diri	Locality	49	Tadjourah
Dissay-Af	Locality	54	Tadjourah
Ditilou	Locality	389	Tadjourah
Djalelo	Locality	100	Arta
Djibouti	City	767,250	Djibouti
Djiska-Dera	Locality	94	Dikhil
Dogodleh	Locality	8	Dikhil
Dogor-Le Koma	Locality	10	Dikhil
Dohaf	Locality	49	Dikhil
Dokqa-Af	Locality	39	Tadjourah
Dooda	Locality	24	Tadjourah
Dori-Af	Locality	43	Tadjourah
Doridaba	Locality	66	Tadjourah
Dorra	Locality	1,021	Tadjourah
Doubou	Locality	210	Tadjourah
Douboub Allaleh	Locality	648	Ali Sabieh
Douboub Dini	Locality	72	Ali Sabieh
Doubte	Locality	213	Tadjourah
Douda Grande	Locality	1,277	Arta
Douda Love	Locality	1,328	Arta
Dougoum	Locality	251	Tadjourah
Douloul	Locality	152	Tadjourah
Douri Koma	Locality	66	Dikhil
Duduro Warableh	Locality	14	Ali Sabieh
Eila Koda	Locality	53	Arta
Eiladhereh	Locality	258	Arta
Ela	Locality	58	Dikhil
Elaleh-Af	Locality	32	Tadjourah
Elam-Af	Locality	37	Tadjourah
Elam-Hougoubou	Locality	45	Tadjourah
Elbahay	Locality	122	Arta
Eli-Daba	Locality	14	Dikhil
Eran	Locality	69	Ali Sabieh
Ereg	Locality	88	Ali Sabieh
Eren	Locality	48	Arta
Ewali	Locality	140	Tadjourah
Eyssalou	Locality	256	Tadjourah
Falaka	Locality	147	Obock
Faligui	Locality	35	Tadjourah
Fantida	Locality	29	Dikhil
Faradil	Locality	37	Ali Sabieh
Faro Daba	Locality	72	Dikhil
Faro Daba Af	Locality	107	Dikhil
Fatha	Locality	107	Dikhil
Fatha	Locality	13	Dikhil
Fatha	Locality	9	Dikhil
Fatha/Dimole	Locality	61	Tadjourah
Feren-Daaba	Locality	161	Tadjourah
Fiiro	Locality	272	Tadjourah
Firiris	Locality	169	Obock
Food	Locality	2	Ali Sabieh
Forage	Locality	385	Tadjourah
Foulia	Locality	37	Dikhil
Fouliyeh	Locality	12	Ali Sabieh
Foura	Locality	49	Dikhil
Gaabon	Locality	19	Tadjourah
Gaadi	Locality	300	Tadjourah
Gaal'a	Locality	10	Dikhil
Gabaa--Kouwa	Locality	90	Tadjourah
Gabayta	Locality	4	Dikhil
Gabla Galan	Locality	104	Arta
Gabla Hamed	Locality	694	Arta
Gabla-Af	Locality	108	Dikhil
Gabla-Dige	Locality	85	Tadjourah
Gablalou	Locality	135	Dikhil
Gablalou	Locality	46	Tadjourah
Gaboli-Amo 1	Locality	7	Dikhil
Gade	Locality	72	Tadjourah
Gadengouba/Tewele	Locality	6	Tadjourah
Gadlo	Locality	52	Tadjourah
Gafoli	Locality	163	Tadjourah
Gafou	Locality	32	Dikhil
Gafoure	Locality	39	Tadjourah
Gagabodley	Locality	482	Ali Sabieh
Gahar	Locality	118	Dikhil
Gahareh	Locality	47	Tadjourah
Gahartou	Locality	15	Tadjourah
Gal Nega Asseh	Locality	99	Ali Sabieh
Gal-Ellah	Locality	321	Tadjourah
Gal-Ellah/Harka	Locality	40	Tadjourah
Galaalou	Locality	18	Tadjourah
Galaato	Locality	49	Dikhil
Galadalen	Locality	46	Obock
Galadin Gollo	Locality	40	Tadjourah
Galafi	Locality	401	Dikhil
Galafi-Poste	Locality	486	Dikhil
Galagalise	Locality	27	Obock
Galah Damoum	Locality	35	Dikhil
Galahleh	Locality	25	Tadjourah
Galahto	Locality	118	Tadjourah
Galahto	Locality	14	Tadjourah
Galamo	Locality	570	Dikhil
Galamo 2 (Raho-Rayma)	Locality	126	Dikhil
Galato	Locality	36	Obock
Galato	Locality	32	Obock
Galatohor	Locality	82	Tadjourah
Galatoli	Locality	8	Dikhil
Galaya-Ouri	Locality	2	Dikhil
Gali-Daba	Locality	225	Obock
Gali-Maqaba	Locality	24	Tadjourah
Galida'ar	Locality	20	Dikhil
Galileh	Locality	197	Ali Sabieh
Galli-Ina	Locality	336	Tadjourah
Galmodow	Locality	50	Dikhil
Galopa	Locality	147	Tadjourah
Gama Dabou	Locality	128	Tadjourah
Gamasso	Locality	221	Tadjourah
Gamorti-Faya	Locality	9	Dikhil
Gamroyta	Locality	13	Tadjourah
Gangi	Locality	56	Dikhil
Gara'bouri	Locality	3	Dikhil
Garab	Locality	14	Obock
Garabeis 1	Locality	18	Dikhil
Garabeis 2	Locality	33	Dikhil
Garabitissan	Locality	495	Tadjourah
Garaitou	Locality	131	Dikhil
Garanleh	Locality	370	Tadjourah
Garasharen	Locality	64	Tadjourah
Garassou	Locality	118	Tadjourah
Garba Youn	Locality	143	Arta
Garba-Gardemo	Locality	139	Obock
Garbaadle-Boora	Locality	210	Tadjourah
Garbanaba	Locality	63	Tadjourah
Garbo	Locality	165	Dikhil
Garbo	Locality	8	Dikhil
Garobba	Locality	91	Tadjourah
Garsa-Eheba	Locality	64	Tadjourah
Garsalou	Locality	73	Obock
Garsalou	Locality	29	Tadjourah
Garselou	Locality	10	Dikhil
Gawra	Locality	61	Tadjourah
Gayal	Locality	43	Tadjourah
Gerentou	Locality	28	Tadjourah
Gibagibleh	Locality	49	Tadjourah
Gibdo-Af	Locality	19	Obock
Gilagili	Locality	104	Arta
Ginni-Oudoum	Locality	8	Tadjourah
Giqimbi	Locality	59	Tadjourah
Go'obodamoum	Locality	25	Dikhil
Gobali	Locality	69	Tadjourah
God Dawo	Locality	193	Ali Sabieh
Godleh-Af	Locality	33	Obock
Godorya	Locality	223	Obock
Gol Aber	Locality	70	Ali Sabieh
Golaber	Locality	18	Ali Sabieh
Golhodi	Locality	127	Obock
Golhol Biyaleh	Locality	78	Ali Sabieh
Gombo	Locality	76	Tadjourah
Gona	Locality	63	Dikhil
Gontoy	Locality	22	Obock
Goolo Biyaleh	Locality	20	Ali Sabieh
Gorri Iliyita	Locality	105	Obock
Gorri Iliyita	Locality	79	Obock
Goubatto	Locality	581	Ali Sabieh
Gouda-Af	Locality	60	Dikhil
Goulouhi	Locality	11	Tadjourah
Goumey Ambado	Locality	36	Arta
Gourabous	Locality	914	Dikhil
Gourgour	Locality	77	Tadjourah
Gourhou	Locality	42	Obock
Gourouhta	Locality	23	Tadjourah
Goutta	Locality	24	Arta
Grab-Ihya	Locality	73	Tadjourah
Grand Mouria	Locality	45	Obock
Gredaha	Locality	167	Obock
Gubangub	Locality	261	Obock
Gudole	Locality	52	Dikhil
Gued Grasleh	Locality	17	Ali Sabieh
Guedi Damer	Locality	100	Arta
Guedi Kayad	Locality	58	Arta
Guedid	Locality	24	Ali Sabieh
Gueherreh	Locality	131	Obock
Guelleh Afwah	Locality	110	Arta
Guestir	Locality	313	Ali Sabieh
Guililah	Locality	85	Tadjourah
Guirori	Locality	194	Tadjourah
Haade	Locality	15	Tadjourah
Habaleyta	Locality	27	Tadjourah
Habsou	Locality	139	Dikhil
Habsou	Locality	104	Dikhil
Hadadina	Locality	54	Tadjourah
Hadhadh	Locality	12	Ali Sabieh
Hadhkodleh	Locality	35	Ali Sabieh
Hadhla	Locality	85	Ali Sabieh
Hadley	Locality	6	Ali Sabieh
Hagande	Locality	142	Tadjourah
Hagil-Af	Locality	17	Tadjourah
Hagueyis	Locality	50	Tadjourah
Hagui	Locality	14	Tadjourah
Haisamal	Locality	208	Arta
Hakara	Locality	26	Tadjourah
Hakli-Af	Locality	139	Obock
Halac	Locality	97	Arta
Haliyo	Locality	40	Obock
Halou	Locality	165	Tadjourah
Hamadi Daba	Locality	89	Tadjourah
Hamakino	Locality	200	Obock
Hamboka	Locality	4	Tadjourah
Hambokta	Locality	41	Tadjourah
Hammar	Locality	157	Obock
Hamoukaleh	Locality	45	Tadjourah
Hamourada	Locality	67	Ali Sabieh
Handou	Locality	105	Obock
Hanedaba	Locality	800	Obock
Hangine	Locality	122	Obock
Hankata	Locality	107	Tadjourah
Hanle 1 (Kouri-Goma)	Locality	199	Dikhil
Hanle 2 (Der-Elwa)	Locality	219	Dikhil
Hanle 3	Locality	49	Dikhil
Haram	Locality	28	Obock
Harartee	Locality	79	Tadjourah
Hararteh	Locality	8	Tadjourah
Harka	Locality	96	Obock
Harka	Locality	95	Tadjourah
Harka-Gouba	Locality	18	Tadjourah
Harrou	Locality	61	Dikhil
Hassan Gouled	Locality	58	Ali Sabieh
Hassan Walaha	Locality	48	Ali Sabieh
Hawa Iscirto	Locality	260	Arta
Hawya	Locality	44	Tadjourah
Hayido	Locality	129	Obock
Hayla	Locality	31	Obock
Hayou	Locality	58	Tadjourah
Hayou Kaleh	Locality	21	Dikhil
Haysama	Locality	133	Dikhil
Heda-Garbo	Locality	15	Tadjourah
Hedalou	Locality	25	Dikhil
Hedle	Locality	307	Obock
Heeroli	Locality	113	Obock
Helamto	Locality	20	Obock
Heraytou	Locality	53	Dikhil
Heriya	Locality	44	Obock
Herkalou	Locality	7	Obock
Hesdaba	Locality	26	Dikhil
Hideyta	Locality	72	Tadjourah
Hilbaley	Locality	184	Arta
Himbisso	Locality	42	Tadjourah
Himboli	Locality	115	Tadjourah
Hindi	Locality	188	Ali Sabieh
Hinia	Locality	76	Ali Sabieh
Hofol	Locality	134	Tadjourah
Holl-Holl	Locality	3,875	Ali Sabieh
Holl-Holl Camp	Locality	4,552	Ali Sabieh
Holoyta	Locality	394	Dikhil
Hougbou	Locality	127	Tadjourah
Hougogiya-Af	Locality	44	Tadjourah
Hougouba	Locality	84	Tadjourah
Hourbeyta	Locality	38	Obock
Ibrin	Locality	13	Ali Sabieh
Ida-Dilah	Locality	68	Ali Sabieh
Iilee	Locality	30	Tadjourah
Il Shabel	Locality	30	Ali Sabieh
Ilayssa	Locality	132	Tadjourah
Ilcha Mogorka	Locality	60	Arta
Ili Gouroubtou	Locality	48	Dikhil
Imima	Locality	19	Tadjourah
Inakbara	Locality	78	Tadjourah
Inanile	Locality	18	Dikhil
Ingidalou	Locality	16	Tadjourah
Inki Awdi	Locality	539	Dikhil
Irac	Locality	52	Dikhil
Issi Wehe	Locality	7	Dikhil
Itkie	Locality	186	Tadjourah
Iya Af	Locality	98	Dikhil
Iyankimbirou	Locality	137	Dikhil
Kaabih	Locality	36	Tadjourah
Kabah Kabah	Locality	175	Ali Sabieh
Kabaneh	Locality	11	Arta
Kabilou	Locality	36	Obock
Kada Dala	Locality	196	Dikhil
Kada Warkita	Locality	18	Dikhil
Kada Yalahlou	Locality	208	Dikhil
Kadad	Locality	23	Dikhil
Kadiguelleh	Locality	13	Ali Sabieh
Kafeyna	Locality	51	Dikhil
Kahla Mouda	Locality	71	Arta
Kahoyta	Locality	22	Tadjourah
Kakomita	Locality	18	Tadjourah
Kalaassa	Locality	120	Tadjourah
Kaladageyna	Locality	96	Tadjourah
Kalaf	Locality	523	Tadjourah
Kalakoum	Locality	78	Tadjourah
Kalamo	Locality	54	Tadjourah
Kalassa	Locality	48	Tadjourah
Kalkalo	Locality	17	Dikhil
Kaloto	Locality	18	Obock
Kalouta-Aff	Locality	28	Dikhil
Kanane	Locality	86	Tadjourah
Kaouna Af	Locality	41	Dikhil
Karasley	Locality	139	Arta
Karkerta	Locality	123	Obock
Karmalou	Locality	22	Tadjourah
Karoubleh	Locality	19	Obock
Karta	Locality	647	Arta
Kartota-Af	Locality	21	Tadjourah
Kasaltou	Locality	37	Dikhil
Kassalto	Locality	50	Tadjourah
Keyt Arweyne	Locality	219	Arta
Khor-Angar	Locality	400	Obock
Khorqaloc	Locality	44	Ali Sabieh
Kilalou	Locality	12	Dikhil
Kilaytou	Locality	38	Obock
Kileita	Locality	179	Dikhil
Kimbire	Locality	173	Tadjourah
Kinay	Locality	13	Tadjourah
Ko'ayto	Locality	24	Dikhil
Kodoqye	Locality	167	Tadjourah
Kolobita Affa	Locality	60	Dikhil
Kontali	Locality	540	Dikhil
Kooma-San	Locality	80	Tadjourah
Kora Nori 1	Locality	49	Arta
Kora Nori 2	Locality	224	Arta
Korali	Locality	98	Tadjourah
Koran	Locality	21	Arta
Korandaba	Locality	220	Tadjourah
Kori	Locality	114	Dikhil
Kori 2	Locality	20	Dikhil
Kouhouleita	Locality	42	Dikhil
Koulanley	Locality	17	Arta
Koulayou	Locality	74	Tadjourah
Kourtoumaley	Locality	80	Arta
Kouseyta	Locality	91	Tadjourah
Kousrali	Locality	14	Tadjourah
Koussan-Daba	Locality	11	Obock
Koussour-Koussour	Locality	35	Dikhil
Koutabouya	Locality	1,161	Dikhil
La'adou	Locality	54	Dikhil
Laataba	Locality	15	Tadjourah
Labebeh-Daaba	Locality	101	Tadjourah
Labo Kodhaleh	Locality	18	Ali Sabieh
Lac Assal	Locality	273	Tadjourah
Ladinani	Locality	46	Tadjourah
Lafofoli	Locality	20	Dikhil
Lafta-Lisinka	Locality	1	Ali Sabieh
Lagalen	Locality	90	Tadjourah
Lahassa	Locality	195	Obock
Lama Sanguer	Locality	57	Dikhil
Lamudeh	Locality	113	Ali Sabieh
Langobaleh	Locality	111	Arta
Leh Asso	Locality	214	Tadjourah
Leita	Locality	967	Arta
Liliya Bouri	Locality	27	Dikhil
Lokoli	Locality	169	Tadjourah
Loubag-Dara	Locality	173	Dikhil
Loubak Daraytou	Locality	21	Dikhil
Loubak Gadi	Locality	11	Dikhil
Loubatanleh	Locality	58	Tadjourah
Maaguido	Locality	115	Tadjourah
Mabdouh-Af	Locality	73	Tadjourah
Mabouk	Locality	171	Obock
Madaga/Dawafa	Locality	6	Tadjourah
Madala-Af	Locality	55	Tadjourah
Madertoli	Locality	105	Dikhil
Madgal	Locality	62	Tadjourah
Madgal-Af	Locality	15	Tadjourah
Madgaleh-Af	Locality	79	Tadjourah
Madgaltoli	Locality	203	Tadjourah
Madgoul/Foroo	Locality	120	Tadjourah
Madra	Locality	56	Dikhil
Magaleh	Locality	69	Tadjourah
Mahrar-Af	Locality	61	Tadjourah
Mak-Hada	Locality	54	Tadjourah
Makoli	Locality	40	Dikhil
Malaho	Locality	691	Tadjourah
Malay	Locality	46	Tadjourah
Malnoub	Locality	149	Arta
Mandalou	Locality	51	Obock
Maoulid	Locality	6	Ali Sabieh
Maow-Af	Locality	52	Obock
Maraaleh	Locality	73	Obock
Maraiya	Locality	29	Tadjourah
Margaassa	Locality	70	Tadjourah
Margoyta	Locality	166	Tadjourah
Marha	Locality	49	Dikhil
Markalou	Locality	10	Dikhil
Markatoli	Locality	35	Dikhil
Marmar	Locality	171	Dikhil
Masgid-Daba	Locality	109	Tadjourah
Masguidlou	Locality	468	Dikhil
Massai	Locality	249	Obock
Maydalaah	Locality	189	Tadjourah
Maysoyta	Locality	207	Tadjourah
Medeho	Locality	301	Obock
Meego	Locality	17	Tadjourah
Menguela	Locality	126	Tadjourah
Midga Rac	Locality	8	Ali Sabieh
Midgan	Locality	18	Ali Sabieh
Mido	Locality	54	Obock
Minangohoa	Locality	90	Tadjourah
Mindile	Locality	14	Dikhil
Mirguida	Locality	25	Tadjourah
Misra	Locality	59	Dikhil
Misra 2	Locality	34	Dikhil
Miyaytoli	Locality	17	Dikhil
Miyoy	Locality	46	Tadjourah
Mokoyta	Locality	16	Dikhil
Mola	Locality	76	Arta
Molla	Locality	14	Tadjourah
Montaoli	Locality	28	Dikhil
Moqorka Carmada	Locality	53	Ali Sabieh
Moudaa	Locality	62	Tadjourah
Moudo	Locality	43	Tadjourah
Moudouhoud	Locality	118	Tadjourah
Moulhoule	Locality	470	Obock
Moulhouleh	Locality	63	Tadjourah
Moulhouli	Locality	96	Dikhil
Mouloud	Locality	4,166	Dikhil
Moulouhle	Locality	8	Dikhil
Moumina	Locality	833	Arta
Mounkour	Locality	133	Tadjourah
Mourkale	Locality	29	Arta
Mouroud	Locality	6	Tadjourah
Moussa Ali/Afdati	Locality	73	Tadjourah
Moussa Ali/Ass-Hougoub	Locality	123	Tadjourah
Moussa Ali/Attamoli	Locality	84	Tadjourah
Moussa Ali/Gabossi	Locality	92	Tadjourah
Moussa Ali/Galikibo	Locality	12	Tadjourah
Moussa Ali/Kilalou	Locality	33	Tadjourah
Moussa Gadweineh	Locality	52	Arta
Moussa Toureh	Locality	122	Arta
Moutrous	Locality	84	Dikhil
Mouyah Amo	Locality	20	Tadjourah
Mouyah-Af	Locality	267	Tadjourah
Nagad	Locality	3,317	Arta
Nakolsale	Locality	4	Dikhil
Nama Karma	Locality	31	Dikhil
Naoub	Locality	52	Tadjourah
Nieri	Locality	4	Ali Sabieh
Niin Bouyi	Locality	4	Dikhil
Nouhta	Locality	304	Obock
Noureh	Locality	37	Ali Sabieh
Obock	City	29,954	Obock
Oboley	Locality	138	Ali Sabieh
Obroy-Af	Locality	170	Tadjourah
Odawa Fall	Locality	105	Ali Sabieh
Odd	Locality	112	Arta
Oli	Locality	132	Dikhil
Omar Jagag	Locality	1,380	Arta
Orbima	Locality	295	Obock
Ormayto	Locality	39	Dikhil
Orobor	Locality	149	Obock
Osman Qoriley	Locality	108	Arta
Othoye	Locality	423	Tadjourah
Oudale-Daba	Locality	7	Tadjourah
Oudaleguera	Locality	39	Tadjourah
Ouddie	Locality	76	Tadjourah
Oudgini	Locality	157	Dikhil
Oudli	Locality	16	Obock
Oudoud-Libahi	Locality	28	Dikhil
Oued Cheikeitti	Locality	104	Dikhil
Oulaliss	Locality	232	Tadjourah
Oulma	Locality	232	Obock
Ounda Wakrita	Locality	19	Dikhil
Ounda Yalahlou	Locality	160	Dikhil
Ounda-Hougoub	Locality	107	Tadjourah
Oundha Hamed	Locality	28	Arta
Ounga Mara	Locality	21	Dikhil
Ounga-Mara	Locality	50	Dikhil
Our-Ganga	Locality	9	Tadjourah
Ouraleh	Locality	21	Dikhil
Ouraley	Locality	58	Dikhil
Ourda	Locality	24	Tadjourah
Ourgad-Af	Locality	116	Tadjourah
Ourgad-Afa	Locality	17	Tadjourah
Ouroukiya	Locality	64	Dikhil
Ourre-Dabba	Locality	37	Tadjourah
Ousaw-Af	Locality	66	Tadjourah
Oussousso	Locality	48	Tadjourah
Peripherique Mouloud	Locality	16	Dikhil
Petite Douda	Locality	796	Arta
PK51	Locality	231	Arta
PK9	Locality	269	Tadjourah
Qaydarey	Locality	27	Ali Sabieh
Qed Balaran	Locality	68	Arta
Qobor	Locality	15	Ali Sabieh
Qossa	Locality	109	Arta
Qoudhach	Locality	370	Arta
Raareh	Locality	32	Tadjourah
Rahleh	Locality	247	Ali Sabieh
Raissa	Locality	32	Tadjourah
Randa	Locality	1,871	Tadjourah
Rari	Locality	119	Ali Sabieh
Ras Bir	Locality	25	Obock
Rassa	Locality	8	Dikhil
Rayssali	Locality	215	Tadjourah
Rerka Guella	Locality	459	Arta
Rigal	Locality	210	Arta
Ripta	Locality	142	Tadjourah
Roueli	Locality	195	Tadjourah
Roure	Locality	263	Obock
Sabolou	Locality	29	Dikhil
Saboub	Locality	176	Tadjourah
Sadli	Locality	65	Dikhil
Saga-Dara	Locality	42	Dikhil
Sagalou	Locality	993	Tadjourah
Saganto	Locality	85	Obock
Sagar	Locality	93	Obock
Said Gaban	Locality	19	Dikhil
Sakhisso	Locality	40	Dikhil
Sakie-Af	Locality	88	Tadjourah
Saleley	Locality	138	Ali Sabieh
Sanka Mouroh Doudoud	Locality	260	Arta
Sankal	Locality	1,261	Dikhil
Sanxa	Locality	145	Dikhil
Sararou	Locality	47	Dikhil
Saraytou	Locality	74	Dikhil
Sarouleh	Locality	24	Dikhil
Sarouli	Locality	31	Dikhil
Sarouli	Locality	27	Obock
Sasakle	Locality	91	Tadjourah
Saytouli	Locality	98	Tadjourah
Saytoun Koma	Locality	68	Obock
Sek Gada	Locality	27	Arta
Sekayto	Locality	45	Tadjourah
Semoleh	Locality	37	Dikhil
Shinile	Locality	55	Ali Sabieh
Sidiha Dabba	Locality	22	Tadjourah
Sidiha Menguela	Locality	164	Obock
Sidiha-Daba	Locality	20	Tadjourah
Siki'le Af	Locality	50	Dikhil
Silal-Mia	Locality	38	Tadjourah
Silal-Mia	Locality	53	Tadjourah
Sinanaba/Dermaleh	Locality	111	Tadjourah
Sira	Locality	41	Arta
Sirage-Daba	Locality	56	Tadjourah
Sisben	Locality	86	Tadjourah
Sisih	Locality	15	Tadjourah
Sismo	Locality	16	Tadjourah
Sissalou	Locality	990	Dikhil
Sissawe	Locality	34	Tadjourah
Sissib	Locality	20	Dikhil
Siyarou	Locality	69	Tadjourah
Siyarou/Harsali	Locality	703	Tadjourah
Solota Koma	Locality	11	Dikhil
Somol	Locality	34	Tadjourah
Sooss	Locality	47	Tadjourah
Sossawaleh	Locality	36	Obock
Soubago	Locality	6	Ali Sabieh
Soublali	Locality	132	Obock
Soufi	Locality	452	Ali Sabieh
Soumeh	Locality	118	Dikhil
Soura	Locality	116	Tadjourah
Soureira	Locality	79	Dikhil
Soytat'le-Daba	Locality	16	Dikhil
Syaro	Locality	103	Ali Sabieh
Ta'assa	Locality	25	Dikhil
Tadjourah	City	19,527	Tadjourah
Tagare	Locality	28	Obock
Taharori	Locality	68	Tadjourah
Tahtahou	Locality	27	Tadjourah
Tamero	Locality	121	Dikhil
Tarana	Locality	92	Tadjourah
Tayara-Bora	Locality	87	Tadjourah
Terdo	Locality	283	Tadjourah
Tero	Locality	29	Obock
Tew-Elee	Locality	284	Tadjourah
Teweo	Locality	98	Dikhil
Teweo Daba	Locality	105	Dikhil
Teweo-Chinile	Locality	540	Dikhil
Tikiblou	Locality	78	Obock
Tikiboh-Amo	Locality	84	Dikhil
Tilyan Faro	Locality	35	Dikhil
Toukoul	Locality	1,511	Arta
Tourkaylo	Locality	51	Dikhil
Touss	Locality	22	Dikhil
Tousse	Locality	7	Dikhil
Waabeyta/Boholi	Locality	15	Tadjourah
Waabeyta/Dawrer-Af	Locality	26	Tadjourah
Waabeyta/Gabouli	Locality	24	Tadjourah
Waabeyta/Makahi	Locality	58	Tadjourah
Waabeyta/Tibidiha	Locality	32	Tadjourah
Waata	Locality	22	Tadjourah
Wada	Locality	74	Ali Sabieh
Waddi	Locality	151	Obock
Wader-Af	Locality	114	Tadjourah
Wahita	Locality	90	Tadjourah
Wahiyhe	Locality	75	Ali Sabieh
Wakil-Af	Locality	21	Tadjourah
Walwaleh	Locality	75	Tadjourah
Wanani	Locality	77	Ali Sabieh
Warabeh Gal	Locality	42	Ali Sabieh
Wassi	Locality	110	Obock
Waydaarin	Locality	119	Tadjourah
Wea	Locality	3,879	Arta
Weaa	Locality	97	Tadjourah
Werka	Locality	28	Ali Sabieh
Xageyda	Locality	27	Ali Sabieh
Ya'atou	Locality	7	Dikhil
Yagalou	Locality	42	Dikhil
Yangouli	Locality	89	Tadjourah
Yaygori	Locality	59	Tadjourah
Yeger Madera	Locality	83	Dikhil
Yerda Gobley	Locality	83	Ali Sabieh
Yoboki	Locality	3,179	Dikhil

== See also ==
- List of cities in East Africa
- List of metropolitan areas in Africa
- List of largest cities in the Arab world
