= National Highway 1 (Djibouti) =

Road in Djibouti

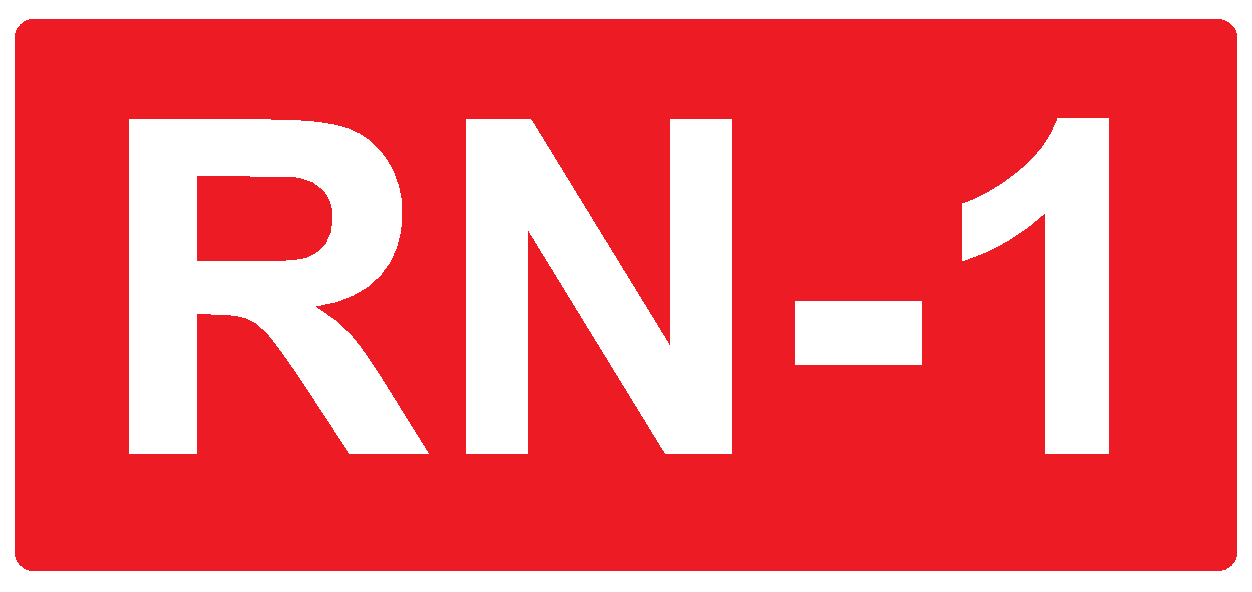
National Highway 1
- Arabic: الطريق السريع الوطنى 1 French: Route Nationale 1
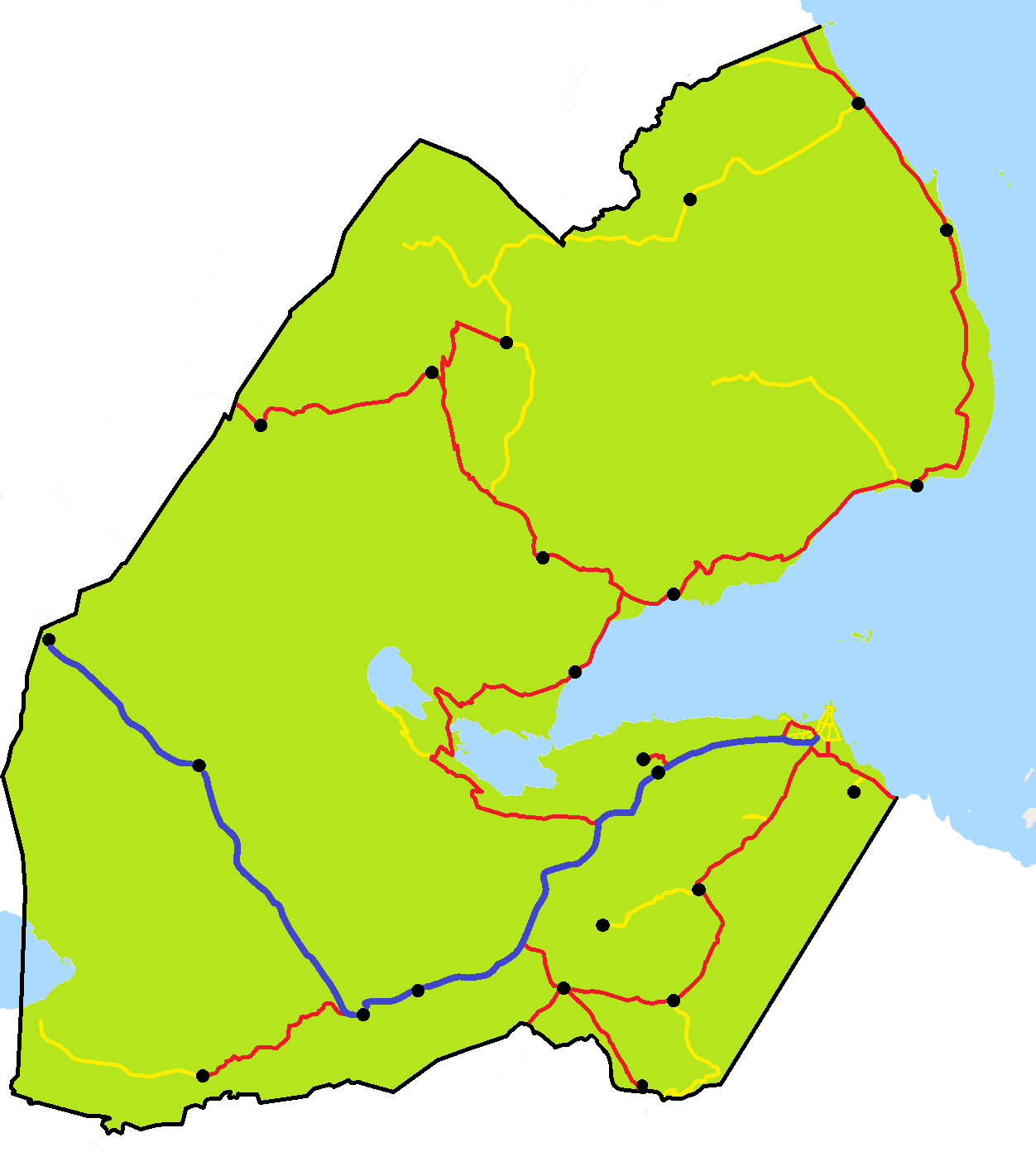

Route information
- Length: 218 km (135 mi)
- Existed: 1976–present

Major junctions
- From: Djibouti City
- To: Galafi

Location
- Country: Djibouti
- Major cities: We`a, Omar Jagaa, Mouloud, Dagguirou, Dikhil, Gorabous, Yoboki

Highway system
- Transport in Djibouti

The RN-1 National Highway is a national highway in Djibouti. It has a length of 218 kilometres (135 mi) across the regions of Djibouti, Arta and Dikhil. It is part of the Ndjamena–Djibouti Highway and is the most important road link in the country.

In recent years, the road has been undergoing major reconstruction works in several parts. The highway is heavily traveled by Ethiopian trucks.

== Route ==
The RN-1 leads to the Djiboutian-Ethiopian border at Galafi border crossing. From Djibouti City that travels through three regions of Djibouti from the Gulf of Aden on the east to the Ethiopia to the west, it passes through Weʽa, Omar Jagaa, Mouloud, Dagguirou, Dikhil, Gorabous and Yoboki.

== History ==
It was on June 28, 1974, the date of an agreement between French Territory of the Afars and the Issas and Ethiopia, that the construction of a road between Dikhil and Galafi was decided with an extension of 30 km to the Ethiopian A1 road (connecting Assab and Addis Ababa). The works were financed by France and carried out between 1975 and 1976 by the COLAS Road Company (130 km including 30 in Ethiopia). However, it was not until the fall of the Ethiopian military regime in 1991 that the border was opened at the Galafi border post.
