= Dagguirou =

Dagguirou داغويرو
- Town
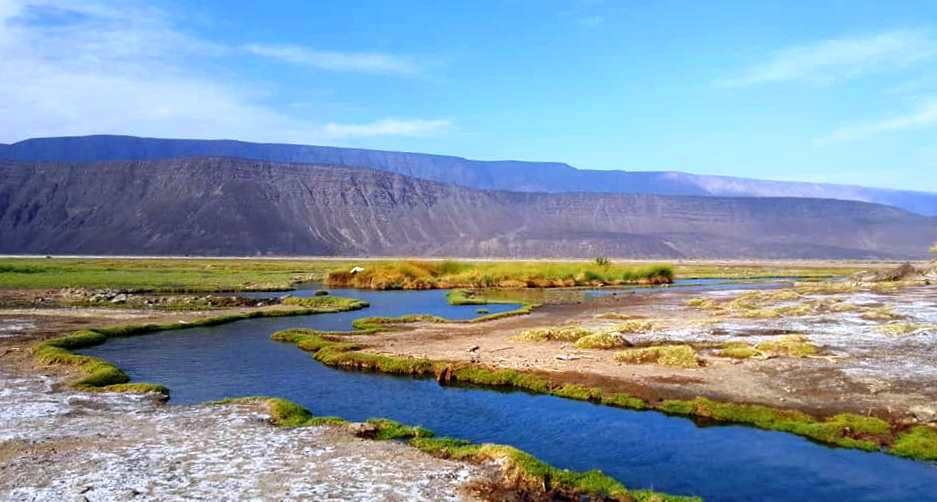
- Landscape near Dagguirou

- Location in Djibouti
- Coordinates: 11°41′N 41°51′E
- Country: Djibouti
- Region: Dikhil Region
- Elevation: 123 m (404 ft)

Dagguirou (Arabic: داغويرو) is a town located in the Dikhil Region of Djibouti. It is situated approximately 212 km (132 mi) western of the nation's capital city of Djibouti, and roughly 95 km (59 mi) northern of Dikhil, the regional capital.

== History ==
Dagguirou was a small village when the French created their French Somaliland.

The Italians complained that the area was part of Italian Eritrea. In 1935 they created a group of small fortifications (Abba, Dagguirou, Gouma, etc.) inside the western border of French Somaliland, claiming at the end of 1937 that the territory was inside their colonial area. Between 1 and 10 July 1940 several clashes with the Italians took place on the plain of Hanlé, at Ali-Sabieh and along the railroad. The border area of western French Somalia (during the first months of World War II) was occupied by Italian troops, who only withdrew from Hanlé in October 1940 and only in March 1941 from Dagguirou.

Actually Dagguirou has a population of nearly 2,000 inhabitants.

== Overview ==
Nearby towns and villages include Galafi (5 km), Yoboki (36 km), Dikhil (95 km) and Mouloud (113 km).

== Climate ==
Dagguirou is located in the Hanlé plain of Djibouti.

Climate data for Dagguirou
Month	Jan	Feb	Mar	Apr	May	Jun	Jul	Aug	Sep	Oct	Nov	Dec	Year
Mean daily maximum °C (°F)	30.0 (86.0)	30.2 (86.4)	32.3 (90.1)	34.3 (93.7)	37.9 (100.2)	40.2 (104.4)	38.9 (102.0)	37.3 (99.1)	36.5 (97.7)	34.4 (93.9)	31.8 (89.2)	30.3 (86.5)	34.5 (94.1)
Mean daily minimum °C (°F)	20.0 (68.0)	20.4 (68.7)	21.8 (71.2)	23.3 (73.9)	25.1 (77.2)	27.2 (81.0)	25.5 (77.9)	25.2 (77.4)	26.0 (78.8)	23.0 (73.4)	20.5 (68.9)	20.3 (68.5)	23.2 (73.7)
Average precipitation mm (inches)	2 (0.1)	5 (0.2)	2 (0.1)	11 (0.4)	8 (0.3)	3 (0.1)	28 (1.1)	45 (1.8)	32 (1.3)	9 (0.4)	0 (0)	1 (0.0)	146 (5.8)
Source: Climate-Data.org

== Bibliography ==
- Imbert-Vier, Simon (2008). Frontières et limites à Djibouti durant la période coloniale (1884–1977) (PhD thesis). Université de Provence–Aix-Marseille I.
- Thompson, Virginia McLean; Adloff, Richard (1968). Djibouti and the Horn of Africa. Stanford Univ. Press. OCLC 465775257.

== See also ==
- French Somaliland in World War II
