= Doudoub Bolole =

Doudoub Bolole بلول دودوب
- Town
- Location in Djibouti
- Coordinates: 11°12′N 42°38′E
- Country: Djibouti
- Region: Ali Sabieh
- Elevation: 560 m (1,840 ft)

Population
  - Total: 153

Doudoub Bolole (Arabic: بلول دودوب) is a town in the Ali Sabieh Region of Djibouti. It is located 68 km south west of the capital Djibouti City, at an altitude of 560m.

== Overview ==
It lies on the National Highway 1. Nearby towns and villages include Ali Sabieh, Djibouti City and Dikhil. The town hosted common military exercises held between the United States Army and the Djibouti Army since 2009. Due to being part of an islamic state, the town has its own daily prayer schedule programmed by Egyptian General Authority of Survey.

== Demographics ==
The town inhabitants belong to various mainly Afro-Asiatic-speaking ethnic groups, with the Issa Somali predominant.

== Gallery ==
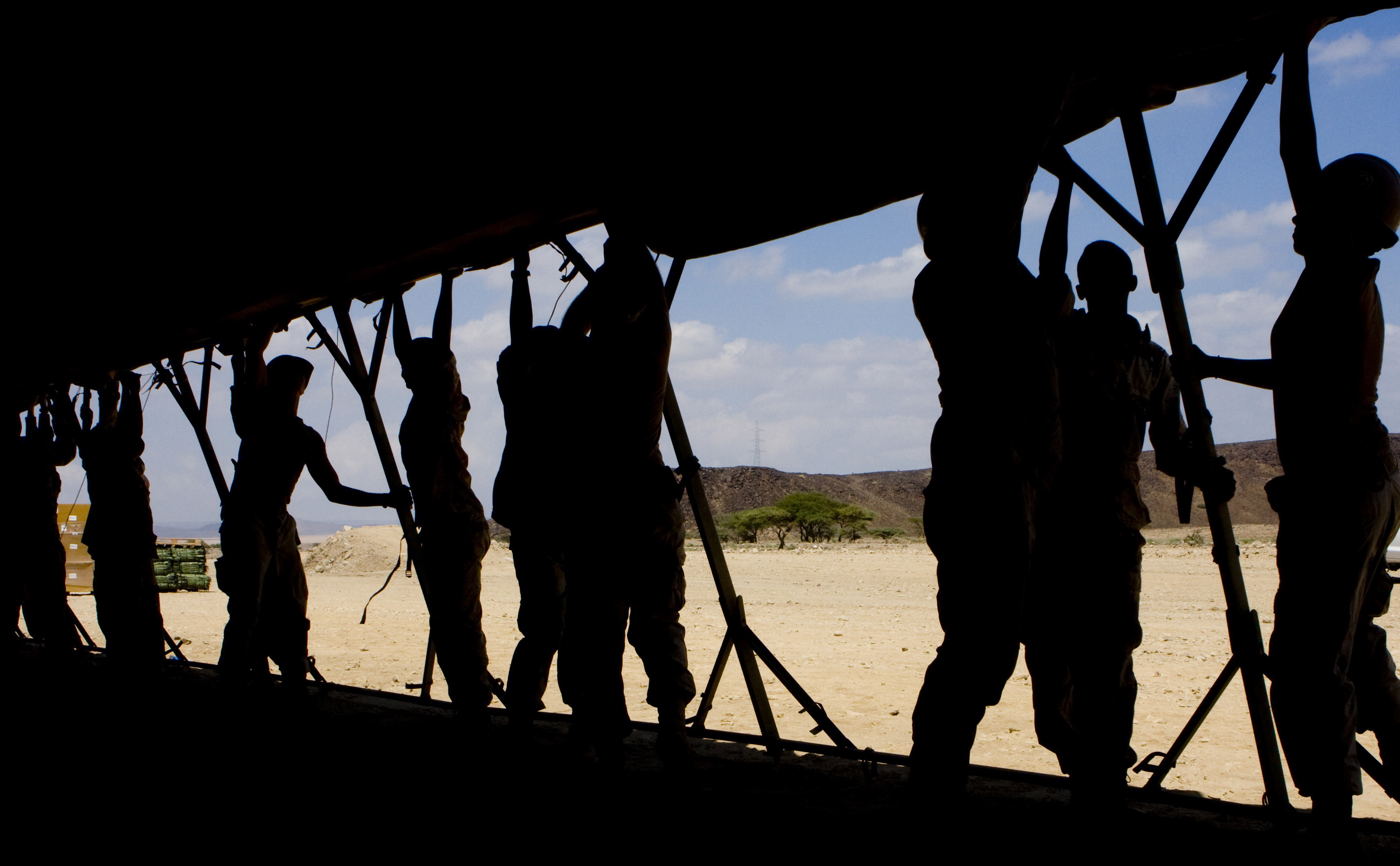

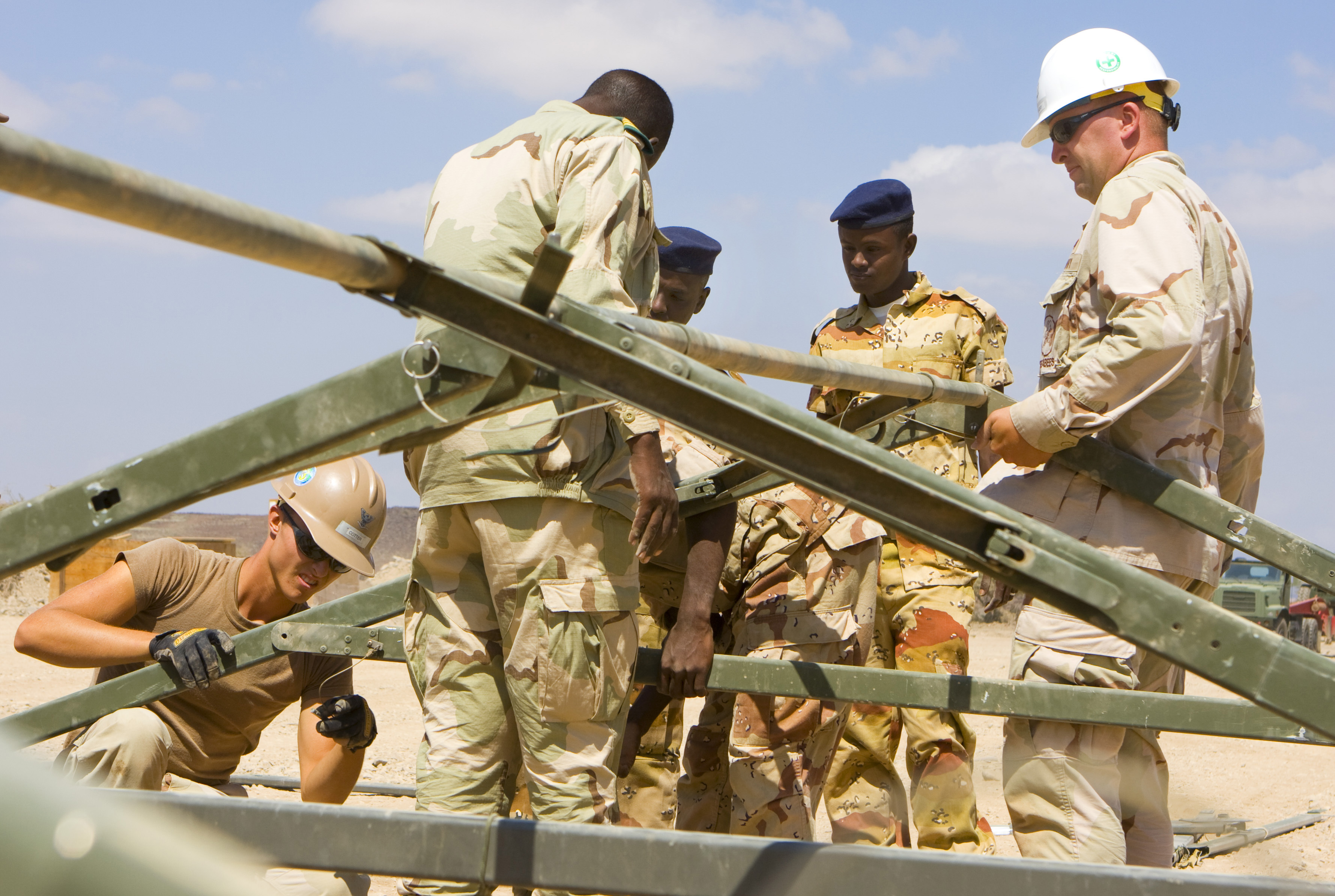

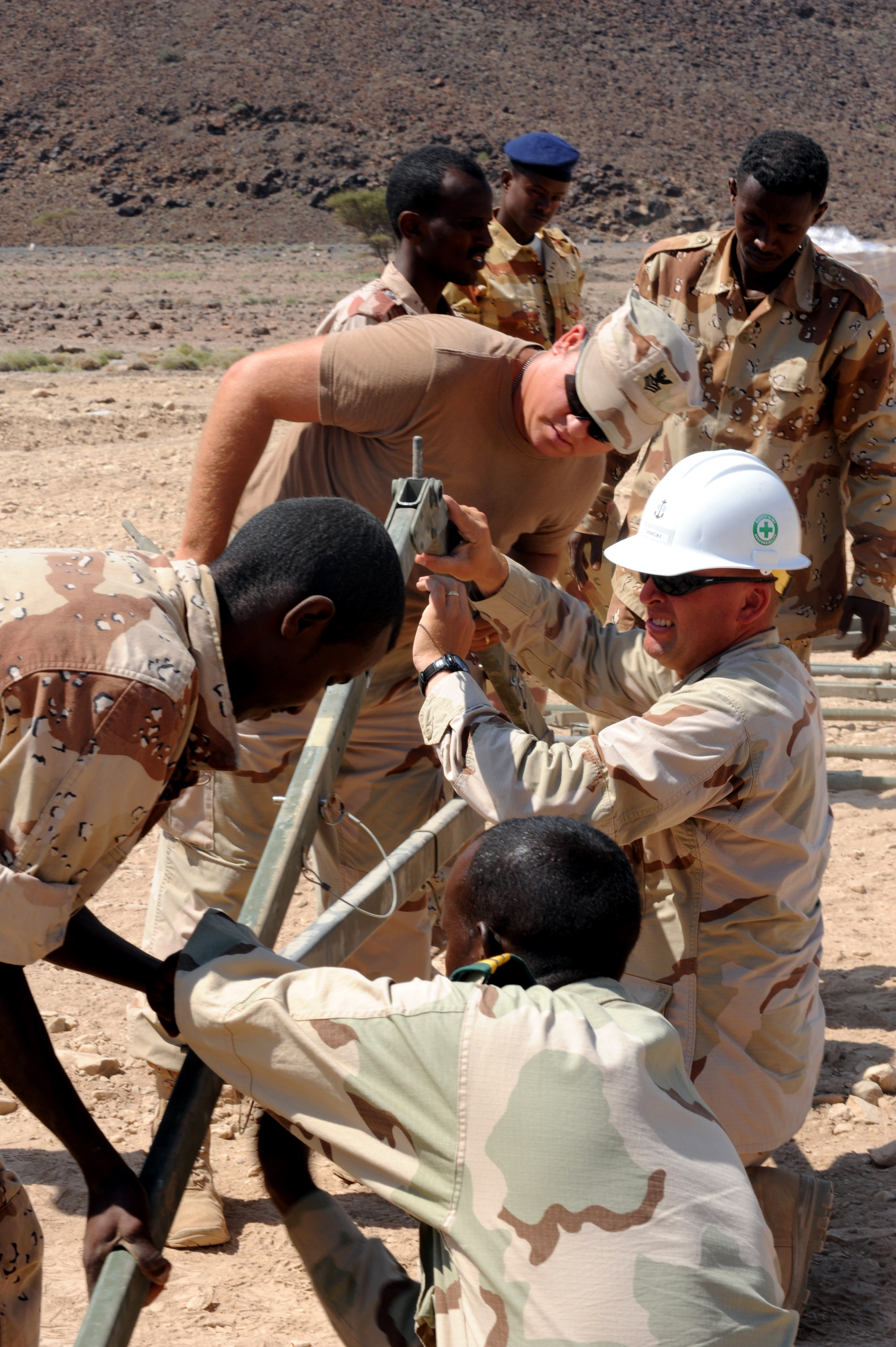
