= Daoudaouga =

Daoudaouga داودوغا
- Location in Djibouti
- Coordinates: 11°45′38″N 42°08′27″E
- Country: Djibouti
- Region: Dikhil
- Elevation: 142 m (466 ft)

Daoudaouga (Arabic: داودوغا) is a town located in the Dikhil Region of Djibouti. It is situated approximately 238 km (148 mi) western of the nation's capital city of Djibouti, and roughly 101 km (63 mi) northern of Dikhil, the regional capital.

== Overview ==
Nearby towns and villages include Yoboki (42 km), Dikhil (101 km), and Balho (35 km).
