= Dikhil Airport =

Airport in Dikhil, Djibouti

- IATA: none; ICAO: HDDK

Summary
- Airport type: Public
- Serves: Dikhil
- Elevation AMSL: 1,520 ft / 463 m
- Coordinates: 11°05′50″N 42°21′00″E

Map
- Location of the airport in Djibouti

Runways
Direction	Length		Surface
Direction	ft	m	Surface
11/29	5,770	1,759	Asphalt
- Source: Google Maps

Dikhil (IATA: HDDK) is an airstrip serving the town of Dikhil in the Dikhil Region of Djibouti.

== See also ==
- Transport in Djibouti
