= Weʽa =

Weʽa وع Weec Oueah
- Town
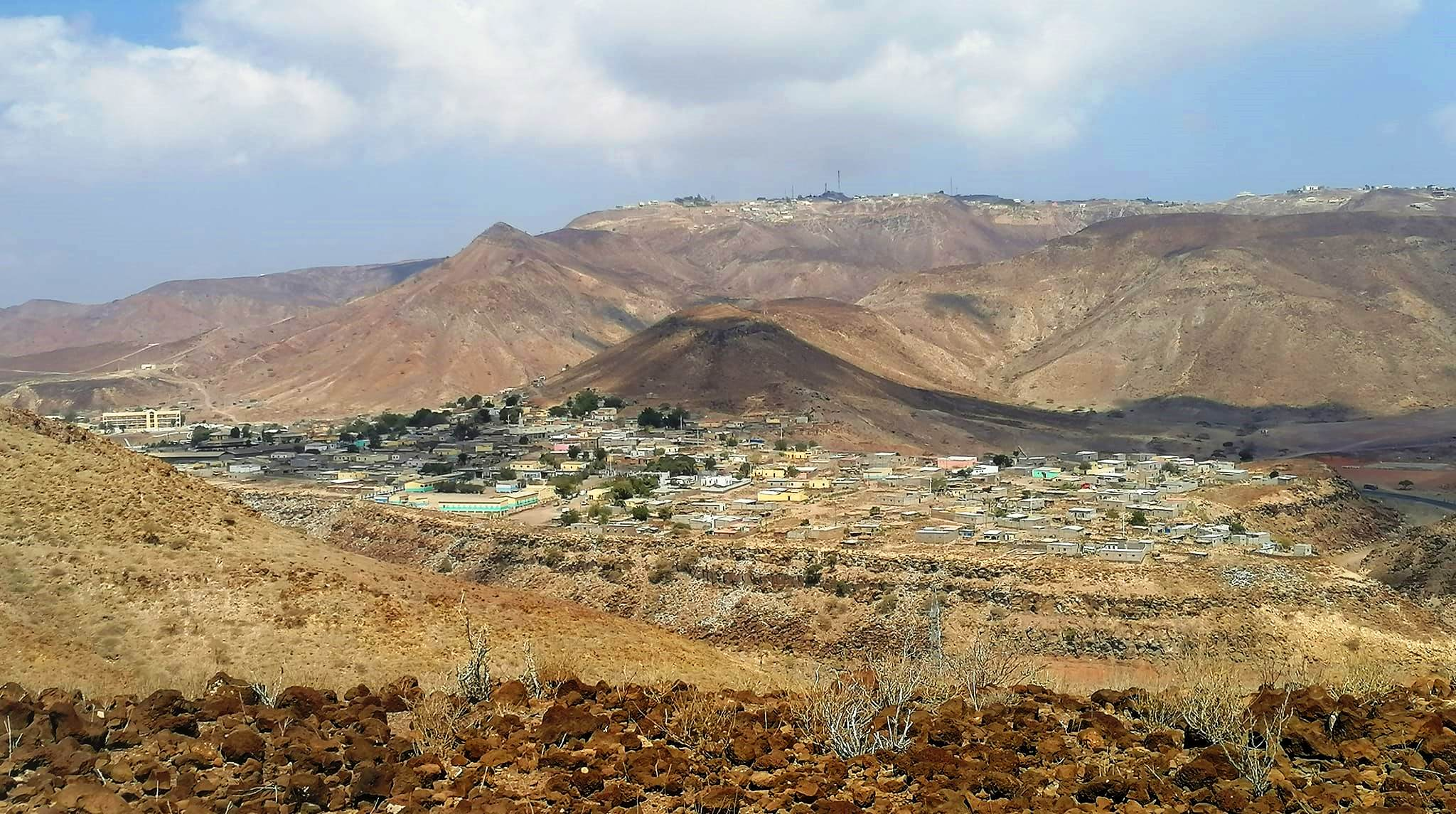
- Weʽa at the bottom and Arta at the top of the mountain.

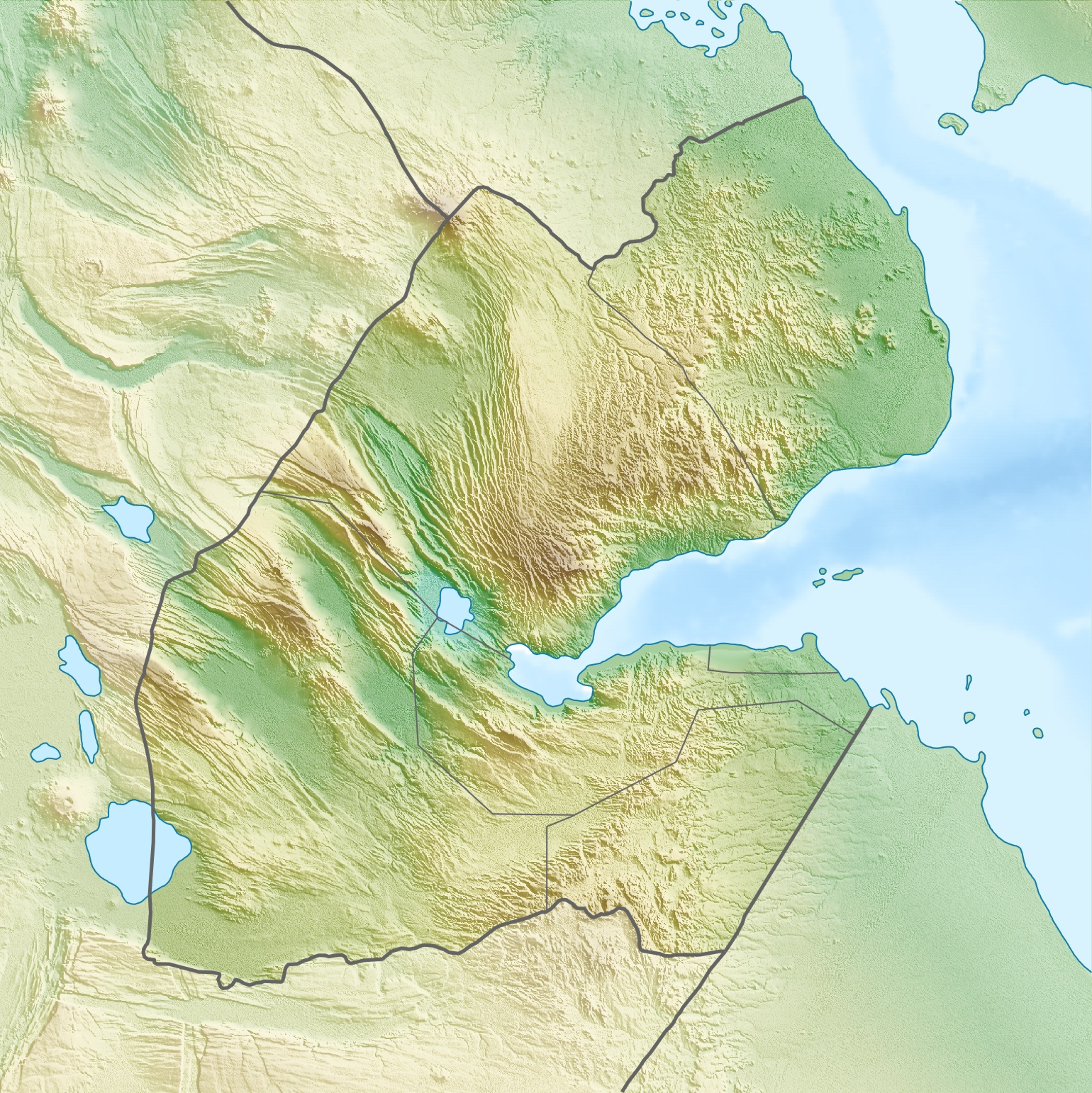
- Location in Djibouti
- Coordinates: 11°30′06″N 42°51′37″E
- Country: Djibouti
- Region: Arta
- Elevation: 455 m (1,493 ft)

Population (2024 census)
  - Total: 3,879
- Time zone: UTC+3 (EAT)
- Climate: BSh

Weʽa or Wêʽa (Arabic: وع, Somali: Weeca) is a town in the Arta Region of Djibouti. It is located on the RN-1 National Highway, which connects it to Djibouti City, located some 37 kilometres (23 miles) to the east. Weʽa is the second largest city in the Arta Region after Arta and before Damerjog. It is the primary transportation hub in western Djibouti via highway. The town is situated in a small valley.

== History ==
Weʽa's place-name literally means "turn" in the Afro-Asiatic Somali language. It later formed a part of the French Somaliland protectorate in the first half of the 20th century.

== Overview ==
Weʽa lies on the RN-1 National Highway.

Weʽa is 36 kilometres (22 mi) west of Djibouti City, 21 kilometres (13 mi) east of Omar Jagaa, 63 kilometres (39 mi) northeast of Mouloud, and 59 kilometres (36 mi) south of Ali Sabieh. Public buses go from Djibouti City to Weʽa, taking about half an hour to get to the town. The ride itself costs around 350 Djiboutian franc. Arta is situated just up the mountain around 3 kilometres (2 miles) to the north.

Additionally, Weʽa serves as a commercial transit point for goods from Ethiopia. Ethiopian trucks and traders frequently pass through the town.

== Geography ==
The town stands at an elevation of around 455 meters (1,493 ft) above sea level, in a narrow valley running roughly east–west in the Mountains of Arta, a major wadi which run beside it. The outskirts of the town have served as a local agricultural center.

=== Climate ===
Weʽa has a hot arid climate (BWh) by the Köppen-Geiger system. The weather is sweltering during summer and very warm during winter. The warmest month of the year is June with an average temperature of 33.9 °C (93.0 °F). In January, the average temperature is 21.8 °C (71.2 °F). It is the lowest average temperature of the whole year and the driest month is June with 3 mm (0.1 in). Most precipitation falls in November, with an average of 42 mm (1.7 in).

Climate data for Weʽa
Month	Jan	Feb	Mar	Apr	May	Jun	Jul	Aug	Sep	Oct	Nov	Dec	Year
Mean daily maximum °C (°F)	25.0 (77.0)	25.4 (77.7)	25.9 (78.6)	29.0 (84.2)	32.9 (91.2)	38.0 (100.4)	37.5 (99.5)	36.6 (97.9)	34.9 (94.8)	30.1 (86.2)	27.8 (82.0)	26.0 (78.8)	30.8 (87.4)
Mean daily minimum °C (°F)	18.5 (65.3)	19.5 (67.1)	20.8 (69.4)	22.4 (72.3)	24.0 (75.2)	28.0 (82.4)	27.1 (80.8)	25.9 (78.6)	25.2 (77.4)	22.6 (72.7)	20.1 (68.2)	18.6 (65.5)	22.7 (72.9)
Average rainfall mm (inches)	43.9 (1.73)	40.5 (1.59)	16.4 (0.65)	21.0 (0.83)	6.1 (0.24)	0.3 (0.01)	5.3 (0.21)	22.3 (0.88)	8.1 (0.32)	11.3 (0.44)	13.2 (0.52)	13.1 (0.52)	201.5 (7.94)
Source 1: Climate-Data.org, altitude: 455m
Source 2: Levoyageur

== Demographics ==
As of the 2024 census, the population of Weʽa was at 3,879. The town inhabitants belong to various mainly Afro-Asiatic-speaking ethnic groups, with the Gadabursi and Issa Somali predominant.

== Sister towns ==
Country	Town
Italy	Lampedusa e Linosa
Spain	Sant Francesc Xavier
Oman	Bukha
