= Gorabous =

Gorabous غورابو
- Town
- Location in Djibouti
- Coordinates: 11°18′15″N 42°13′1″E
- Country: Djibouti
- Region: Dikhil
- Elevation: 296 m (971 ft)

Population (2024 census)
  - Total: 930

Gorabous (Arabic: غورابو) is a town located in the centre of Dikhil Region in Djibouti.

== Overview ==
Nearby towns and villages include Yoboki (30 km), Dikhil (29 km) and Galafi (70 km).
