= Arta Region =

Region of Djibouti

Coordinates: 11°31′N 42°50′E

Arta Region Gobolka Carta إقليم عرتا
- Region (Gobolka)
- Country: Djibouti
- Administrative centre: Arta

Area
  - Total: 1,800 km^{2} (690 sq mi)

Population (2024 census)
  - Total: 48,922
  - Density: 27/km^{2} (70/sq mi)
- Time zone: UTC+3 (EAT)
- ISO 3166 code: DJ-AR

Arta Region (Arabic: إقليم عرتا, Somali: Gobolka Carta) is one of the six regions of Djibouti. It was officially created in 2003 by the regrouping of sub-prefectures of the regions of Dikhil and Djibouti. It is situated in the south-central of the country, bordering the Tadjoura Region to the north, and the Djibouti Region to the north-east, and Dikhil Region the Ali Sabieh Region to the south, the country of Somaliland lies to the east.

The capital of Arta Region is Arta. Other towns include We`a, Damerjog and Loyada. The Hemed mountain is the highest point in the region of Arta.

== Climate ==
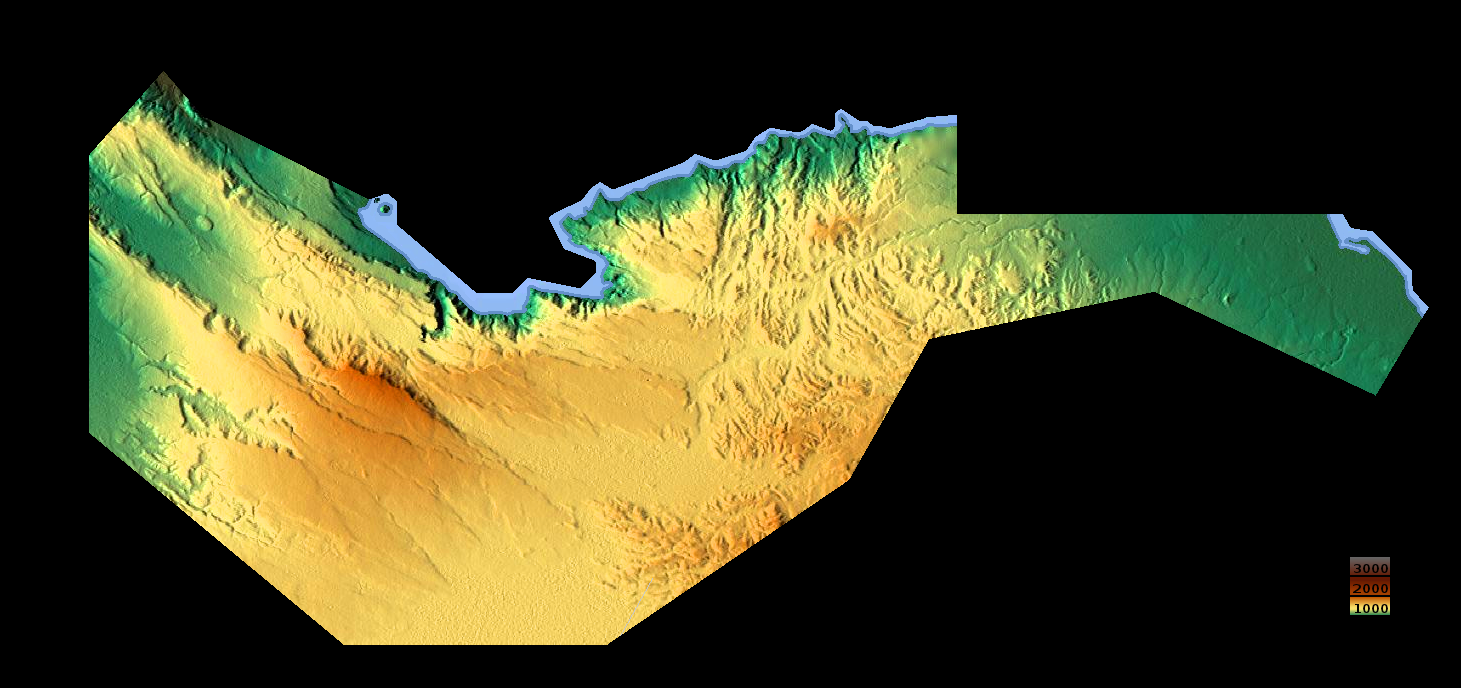
A topographic map of the Region of Arta.

The climate of Arta Region is generally semi-arid to arid, and its territory is mostly covered by mountains, high plains, and desert. The climate of the coastal strip is influenced by warm ocean waters, keeping the region free from extremes of temperature and providing moisture for rainfall. However, most of the Arta Region populace experience two weather seasons: a "winter" period of rather cold and warm temperatures and higher levels of rainfall and a sultry summer period of hot, sticky temperatures.

The annual mean statistics for some Arta Region centres is shown below:

Town	Min. Temp	Max. Temp	Rainfall
Arta	17.1 °C (62.8 °F)	37.3 °C (99.1 °F)	205 mm (8.1 in)
We`a	18.5 °C (65.3 °F)	38.7 °C (101.7 °F)	201 mm (7.9 in)
Loyada	20.5 °C (68.9 °F)	40.5 °C (104.9 °F)	163 mm (6.4 in)

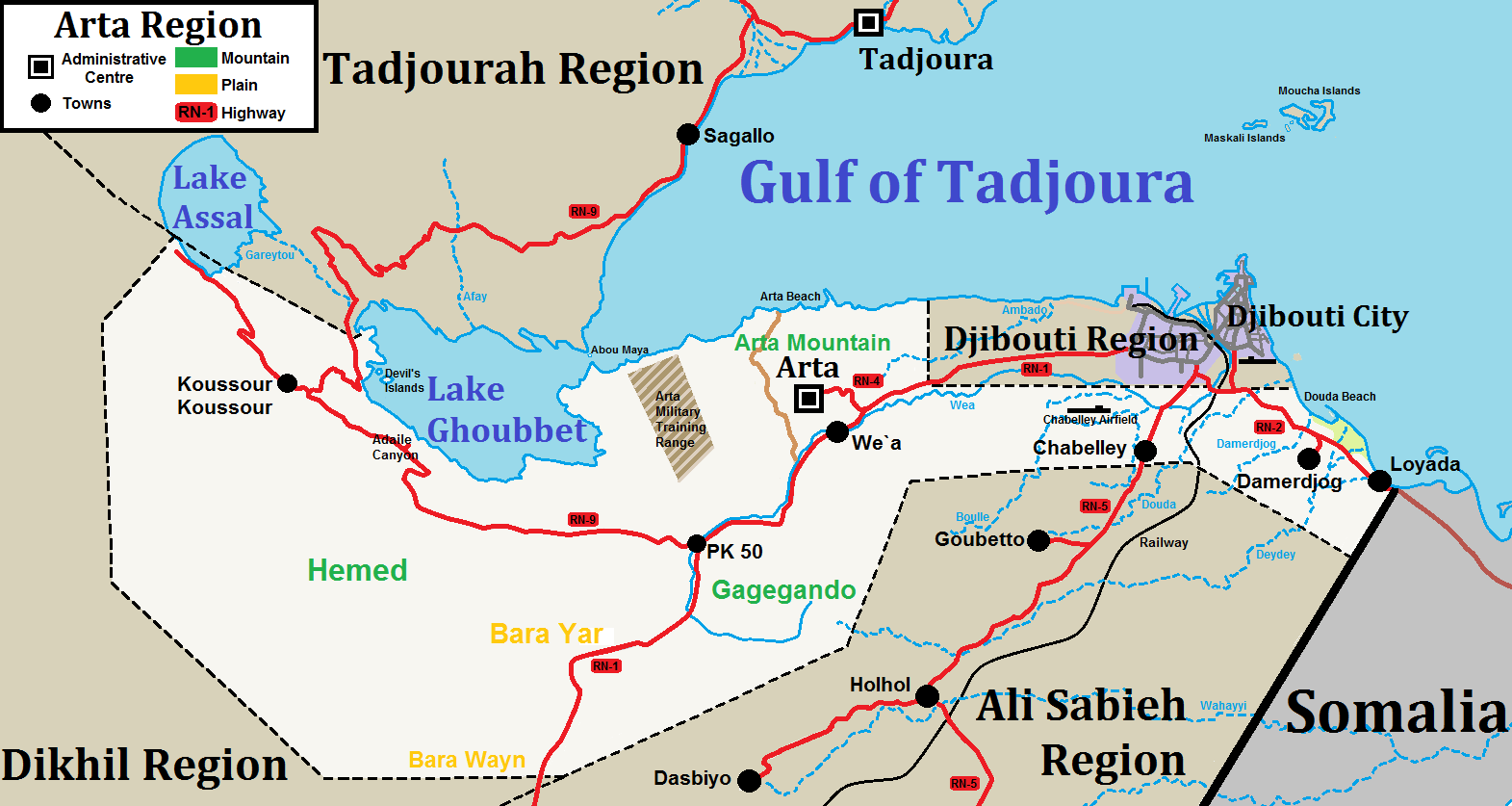
Map of the Arta Region.

== Towns ==
Arta Region
Town names
Arta
We`a
Loyada
Chabelley
Omar Jagaa
Damerjog
Koussour
