= Mouloud =

Mouloud مولود
- Town
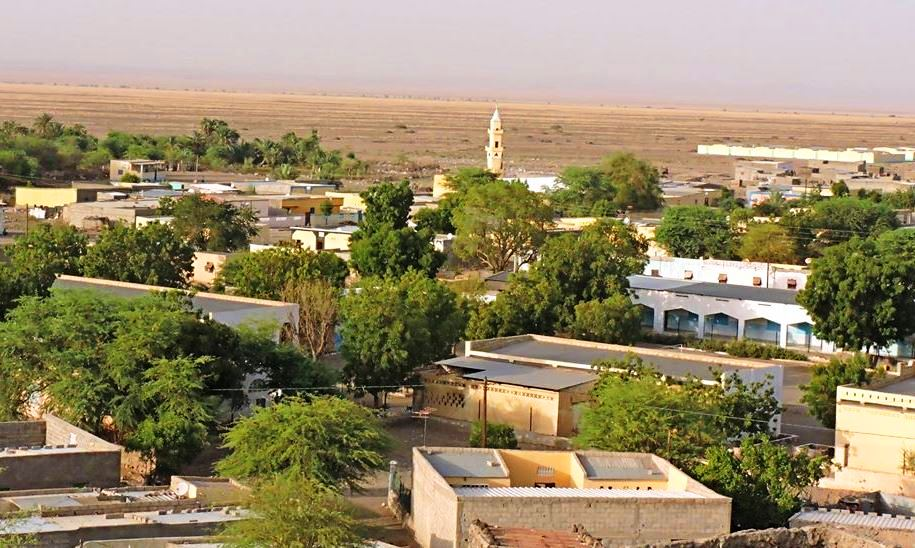

- Location in Djibouti
- Coordinates: 11°09′00″N 42°30′00″E
- Country: Djibouti
- Region: Dikhil
- Elevation: 590 m (1,940 ft)

Population (2024 census)
  - Total: 4,138

Mouloud (Arabic: مولود, romanized: Mawlūd) is a town located in the southern Dikhil region of Djibouti. It is located around 102 kilometers south of the capital, Djibouti City.

== Overview ==
It lies on the National Highway 1.

Nearby towns and villages include Djibouti City (102 km), Dadahalou (15 km), Ali Sabieh (30 km), Weʽa (64 km) and Dikhil (20 km).

== Demographics ==
As of the 2024 census, the population of Mouloud was at 4,138. The town's inhabitants belongs to various mainly Afro-Asiatic speaking ethnic groups, with the Issa Somali predominant.

== Climate ==
The warmest month of the year is June with an average temperature of 35.7 °C. In January, the average temperature is 22.8 °C. It is the lowest average temperature of the whole year and the driest month is December with 2 mm. Most precipitation falls in August, with an average of 41 mm.

Climate data for Mouloud
Month	Jan	Feb	Mar	Apr	May	Jun	Jul	Aug	Sep	Oct	Nov	Dec	Year
Mean daily maximum °C (°F)	25.0 (77.0)	25.7 (78.3)	26.2 (79.2)	28.3 (82.9)	32.2 (90.0)	37.5 (99.5)	37.1 (98.8)	36.5 (97.7)	34.1 (93.4)	29.3 (84.7)	26.7 (80.1)	25.5 (77.9)	30.3 (86.6)
Mean daily minimum °C (°F)	17.0 (62.6)	18.5 (65.3)	20.0 (68.0)	21.4 (70.5)	23.3 (73.9)	25.5 (77.9)	26.5 (79.7)	26.1 (79.0)	25.5 (77.9)	22.2 (72.0)	19.4 (66.9)	17.5 (63.5)	21.9 (71.4)
Average rainfall mm (inches)	6 (0.2)	7 (0.3)	15 (0.6)	33 (1.3)	9 (0.4)	2 (0.1)	29 (1.1)	41 (1.6)	39 (1.5)	9 (0.4)	5 (0.2)	3 (0.1)	198 (7.8)
Source: The Weather Channel
