= Galafi =

Galafi غالافي
- Town
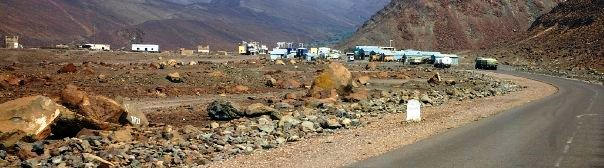

- Location in Djibouti
- Coordinates: 11°43′01″N 41°50′12″E
- Country: Djibouti
- Region: Dikhil
- District: Galafi
- Elevation: 161 m (528 ft)

Population (2012)
  - Total: 1,849

Galafi (Arabic: غالافي), also known as Gâlâfi, is a village in western Djibouti. Galafi is the official border crossing from Djibouti into Ethiopia. Situated on the border with Ethiopia, it is in the north west of Dikhil. It lies on the National Highway 1. It is located some 218 km (135 mi) west of the national capital, Djibouti City. Nearby towns and villages include Yoboki (40 km), Dikhil (98 km), Semera (114 km), Bure (157 km) and Elidar (70 km).

== History ==
Since 1975, an all-weather road combines Galafi with Djibouti City and neighboring Ethiopia and Eritrea. This road, part of the trade between Ethiopia and Djibouti, is handled, but it plays a minor role compared with the railway link Addis Ababa and Djibouti City. In 1978 she came briefly to the more important in the rail route was suspended due to the Ogaden War. On 27 May 1991, 30,000 men from the Ethiopian army forcing the way to the West boundary to Galafi during the Ethiopian Civil War.

== Climate ==
Climate data for Galafi
Month	Jan	Feb	Mar	Apr	May	Jun	Jul	Aug	Sep	Oct	Nov	Dec	Year
Mean daily maximum °C (°F)	30.1 (86.2)	30.5 (86.9)	32.5 (90.5)	34.6 (94.3)	37.6 (99.7)	40.9 (105.6)	40.2 (104.4)	38.8 (101.8)	37.6 (99.7)	34.9 (94.8)	32.1 (89.8)	30.4 (86.7)	35.0 (95.0)
Mean daily minimum °C (°F)	20.0 (68.0)	21.9 (71.4)	23.2 (73.8)	24.9 (76.8)	27.1 (80.8)	29.4 (84.9)	28.0 (82.4)	27.5 (81.5)	28.2 (82.8)	24.7 (76.5)	22.2 (72.0)	21.0 (69.8)	24.8 (76.7)
Average precipitation mm (inches)	5 (0.2)	6 (0.2)	8 (0.3)	9 (0.4)	5 (0.2)	2 (0.1)	26 (1.0)	38 (1.5)	16 (0.6)	4 (0.2)	7 (0.3)	3 (0.1)	129 (5.1)
Source: Climate-Data.org, altitude: 161m
