= Omar Jagaa =

Omar Jagaa Cumar Jagac
- Location in Djibouti
- Coordinates: 11°22′33″N 42°45′25″E
- Country: Djibouti
- Region: Arta
- Elevation: 1,913 ft (583 m)

Population (2024 census)
  - Total: 1,380
- Time zone: UTC+3 (EAT)
- Climate: BSh

Omar Jagaa (Somali: Cumar Jagac) is a town in the Arta Region of Djibouti. It is located on the RN-1 National Highway, which connects it to Djibouti City, located some 57 kilometres (35 miles) to the east. It is the primary transportation hub in western Djibouti via highway. The town is situated in a small valley.
