= Yoboki =

Yoboki يوبوكي
- Town
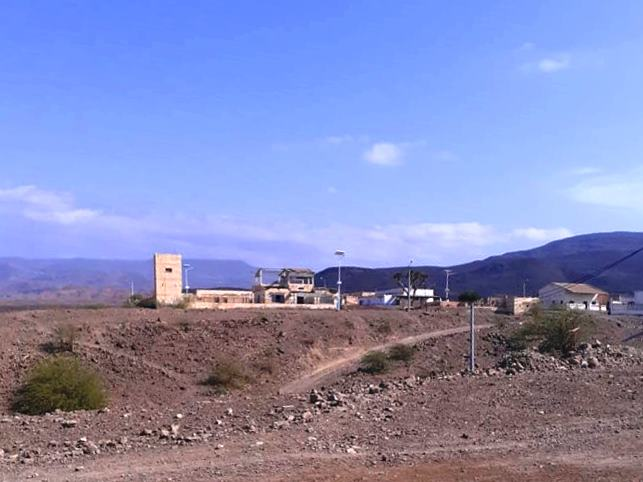

- Location in Djibouti
- Country: Djibouti
- Region: Dikhil
- Elevation: 250 m (820 ft)

Population (2024 census)
  - Total: 3,147

Yoboki (Arabic: يوبوكي) is a town located in the western Dikhil Region of Djibouti. It is situated approximately 179 km (111 mi) west of the nation's capital city of Djibouti, and roughly 59 km (37 mi) northwest of Dikhil, the regional capital.

== History ==
Yoboki was established as a French military post in 1946, and buildings were constructed between July and November 1947 at the location of a well. The first meeting between the French soldiers, who began to occupy the territory, and representatives of the Sultan of Awsa, including Mahammad Yayyo, took place here. In 1958, a school was opened for the nomads. In 1979 a French teacher was kidnapped in Yoboki.

Bomb attacks by an unknown perpetrator were reported in mid-May 1990, which affected electric and military installations in the town. Due to conflict in the area between rebels and the government, since March 28, 1992 troops from the 5th Interarm Regiment of the French Overseas Navy have been deployed in Yoboki, Obock, and Tadjoura. The rebels were driven out to Gorabous. According to an October 1993 Amnesty International publication, "50 civilians were reportedly extrajudicially executed by government troops after a FRUD force withdrew from the village."

== Demographics ==
In 1968, Yoboki had a population of around 200 residents, mostly Afar. More recent estimates indicate that the town has a population of 644.

== Overview ==
Nearby towns and villages include Tew'o (10 km), Dikhil (59 km) and Galafi (40 km).

== Geography and climate ==
Yoboki is located at an altitude of 250 meters above sea level in the hills, rising to 972 meters at Babba Alou. Yoboki National Park surrounds the town and Hanle Valley is in the vicinity. The area is prone to earthquakes and landslides.

Climate data for Yoboki
Month	Jan	Feb	Mar	Apr	May	Jun	Jul	Aug	Sep	Oct	Nov	Dec	Year
Mean daily maximum °C (°F)	29.9 (85.8)	30.2 (86.4)	32.3 (90.1)	34.4 (93.9)	37.6 (99.7)	40.4 (104.7)	40.3 (104.5)	39.2 (102.6)	37.6 (99.7)	34.6 (94.3)	31.8 (89.2)	30.2 (86.4)	34.9 (94.8)
Mean daily minimum °C (°F)	19.0 (66.2)	20.5 (68.9)	21.6 (70.9)	23.3 (73.9)	25.0 (77.0)	27.2 (81.0)	29.4 (84.9)	28.8 (83.8)	27.2 (81.0)	23.8 (74.8)	21.1 (70.0)	19.4 (66.9)	23.9 (74.9)
Average rainfall mm (inches)	6 (0.2)	6 (0.2)	3 (0.1)	10 (0.4)	4 (0.2)	3 (0.1)	45 (1.8)	55 (2.2)	26 (1.0)	2 (0.1)	4 (0.2)	4 (0.2)	168 (6.7)
Source 1: Climate-Data.org
Source 2: Levoyageur

== Transport ==
Yoboki is well connected, linked by National Highway 1, National Highway 7 and National Highway 8; these roads lead to other cities such as Dikhil, Galafi, Dobi and Djibouti city.

== Notable people ==
- Moussa Mohamed Ahmed (1963-)
