= Dikhil =

Dikhil دخل
- Town
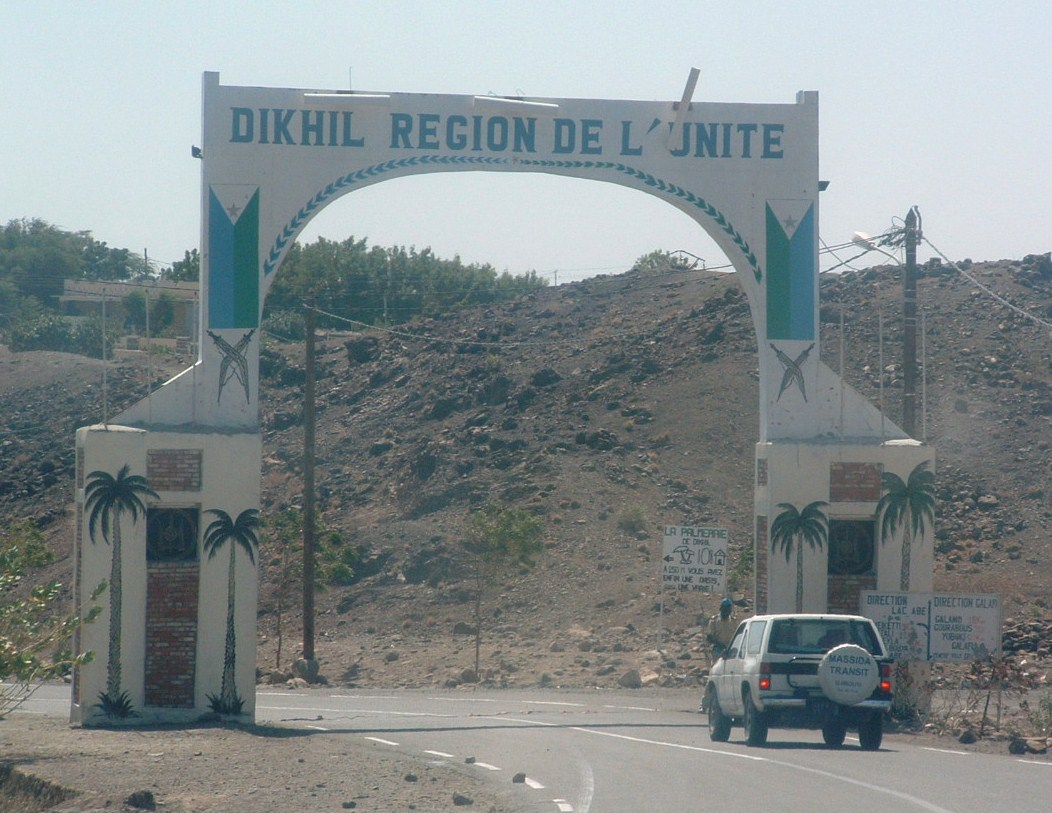
- Entrance to Dikhil

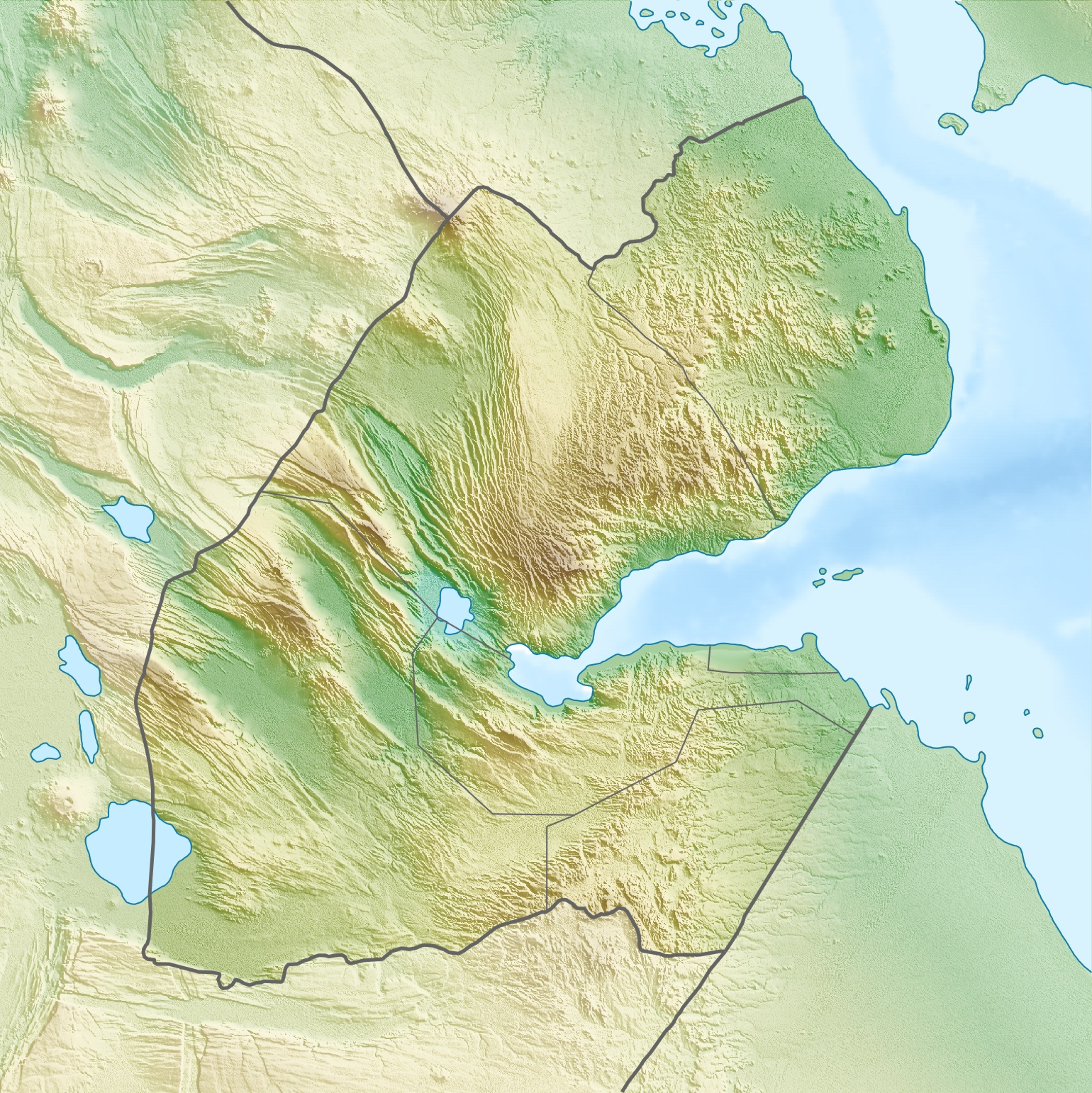
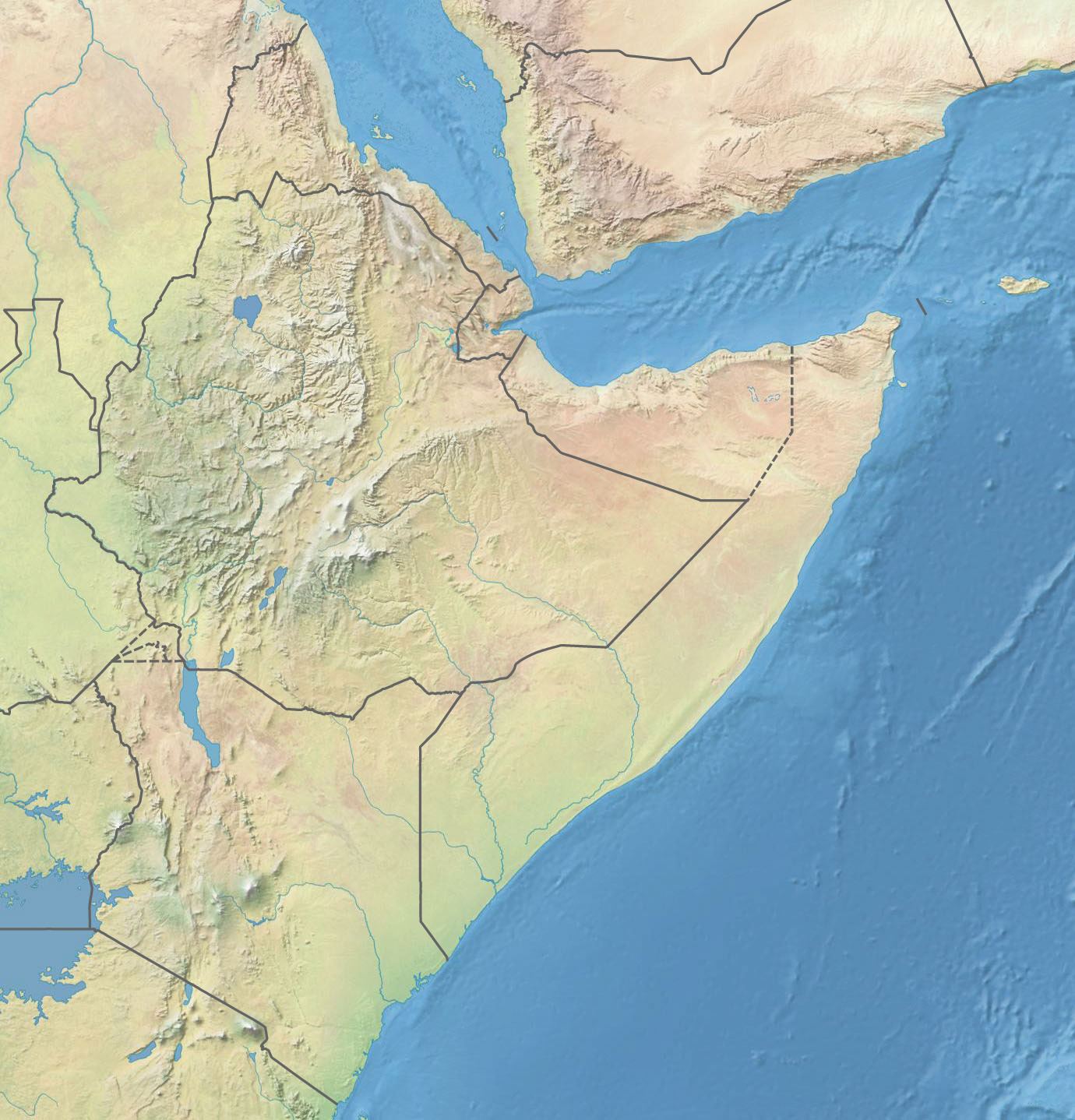
- Location within Djibouti Location within the Horn of Africa Location within Africa
- Coordinates: 11°06′30″N 42°22′16″E
- Country: Djibouti
- Region: Dikhil

Area
  - Total: 9.963 km^{2} (3.847 sq mi)
- Elevation: 507 m (1,663 ft)

Population (2024 census)
  - Total: 27,378
  - Density: 2,748/km^{2} (7,117/sq mi)
- Time zone: UTC+3 (EAT)

Dikhil (Arabic: دخيل) is a town in the western Dikhil Region of Djibouti. Lying east of Lake Abbe, It is situated about 122 km (76 mi) southwest of Djibouti City and 12 km (7.5 mi) north of the border with Ethiopia. It serves as the administrative centre of the Dikhil Region, and is home to the Afar and Somali ethnic groups. The town develops gardens and fruit trees.

== History ==
=== Prehistory ===
In 1986, the survey work sites were performed by R. Joussaume and researchers ISERST. The engravings oldest discovered to date are from the fourth or third millennium BC, the most famous is the site of Handoga near Dikhil where the ruins of a village squares sub circular dry stone delivered different objects. Including ceramic shards matching vases used brazier, or containers that can hold water, several choppers and microliths, blades, drills, trenchers basalt, rhyolite or obsidian. Also a pearl orange coralline, three glass paste, etc.. There were no trace of metal object.

=== French Somaliland ===
The village was originally built around the well of Harrou near a wadi, with houses constructed of mud and stone, the Afar and Issa were the founders of Dikhil. As the village continued to grow after the established of the French Somaliland. Most of the inhabitants earned their living through animal husbandry and commerce, and used a well for drinking water. In December 1927, the French colonial authorities sent a military detachment to reconnoiter the region, in order to prepare the installation of a defense post, intended to secure the borders of the French Somaliland. The first administrative division of the territory, in 1914, defined two zones besides the city of Djibouti: the districts "Dankali" and "Issa". With the occupation of the territory at the end of the 1920s, the district circles of "Tadjoura" and "Gobad-Dikhil" are created, in 1930, became the capital of a new administrative district, called the Circle of Dikhil. When Wilfred Thesiger visited Dikhil in May 1934, he was struck by "a most impregnable fort here" recently constructed by the French colonial authorities. "The walls are twenty feet high, loop-holed, and topped with broken glass and a barbed-wire entanglement. There are two large observation towers." He believed that garrison stationed there provided its only economic support, for had "the site any real value it would have been used before this by the natives. On January 17, 1935, Albert Bernard was a colonial administrative student, learned that an Assaïamara raid had looted camps and returned to the west to Ethiopia. He left accompanied by fifteen or seventeen troops to intercept him. On the morning of the 18th, near Môdathou, south of Lake Abbe, he led an attack against the group, but his troops, although better equipped, were overwhelmed by the number. Albert Bernard is killed, probably cut his throat, as well as all the troops except two. In 1933, an airstrip was built and, three years later, in 1936, Ali Sabieh's road was extended to Djibouti. An elementary school was established in the village in 1940s, and there were several shops. During World War II, Italy's declaration of war on France and Great Britain came on 10 June 1940. The Italians did undertake some offensive actions beginning on 18 June. From Harrar Governorate, troops under General Guglielmo Nasi to attack French Somaliland, there was some skirmishes. When the government on 10 July learned that the armistice was not yet put into effect in French Somaliland, President Philippe Pétain a collaborationist government at Vichy sent General Gaëtan Germain as his personal representative to correct the situation. Negotiations at Dewele, Italian East Africa on the local implementation of the armistice were only finally completed on 8 August. The Commander-in-Chief, East Africa, William Platt, codenamed the negotiations for the surrender of French Somaliland "Pentagon", because there were five sides: himself, the Vichy governor, the Free French, the British minister at Addis Ababa and the United States. Christian Raimond Dupont surrendered and Colonel Raynal's troops crossed back into French Somaliland on 26 December 1942, completing its liberation. The official handover took place at 10:00 p.m. on 28 December. The first governor appointed under the Free French was André Bayardelle. A local battalion from French Somaliland participated in the Liberation of Paris in 1944. During the 1970s, the Front for the Liberation of the Somali Coast (FLCS), who attacked the French personnel who were patrolling the area.

=== Djibouti ===
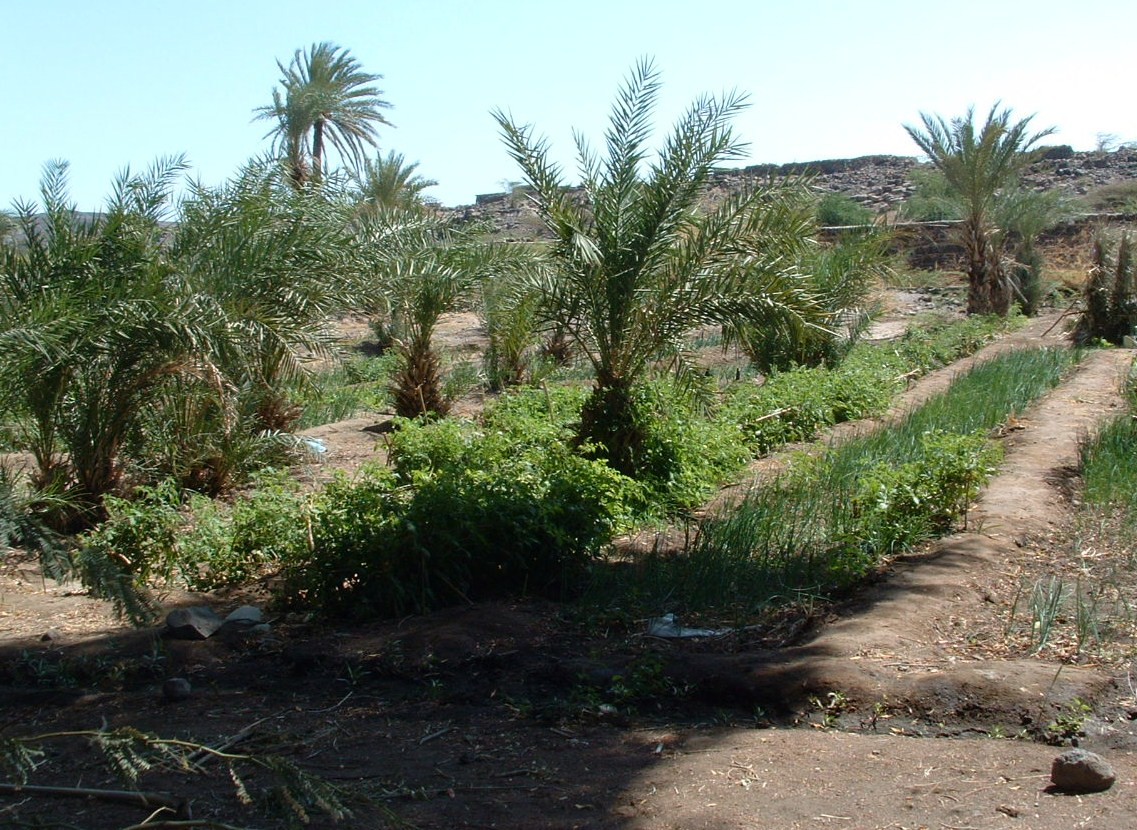
Palm garden of Dikhil

A third independence referendum was held in the French Territory of the Afars and the Issas on 8 May 1977. The previous referendums were held in 1958 and 1967, which rejected independence. This referendum backed independence from France. A landslide 98.8% of the electorate supported disengagement from France, officially marking Djibouti's independence. Following the conclusion of the 1977-1978 Ogaden War, Dikhil along with Ali Sabieh accommodated three quarters of the 8,000 Issas who had fled from Ethiopia. In 1979, the first President of independent Djibouti Hassan Gouled Aptidon in Dikhil the party founded the People's Rally for Progress, which has since dominated the politics of Djibouti, its led by President Ismail Omar Guelleh and is in a coalition government with Front for the Restoration of Unity and Democracy (FRUD) and other parties.

== Overview ==
Dikhil is connected to other environs by RN-1 National Highway. Public buses go from Djibouti City to Dikhil. It takes three hour to get to Dikhil. A contracted bus ride from Djibouti city to Dikhil can charge between 750 Djiboutian franc. This is a summer tourist destination for Djibouti thanks to its healthy climate and its location on the road to Lake Abbe. Dikhil is located 12 kilometers from the Ethiopian border and approximately 100 kilometers beyond Djibouti City. It is a population center for the South west area, a frontier town with about 54,000 people.

== Demographics ==
As of the 2024 census, the population of Dikhil was at 27,378. The town inhabitants belong to various mainly Afro-Asiatic-speaking ethnic groups, but the Afar, Gadabursi and the Issa Somali are predominant.

== Transport ==
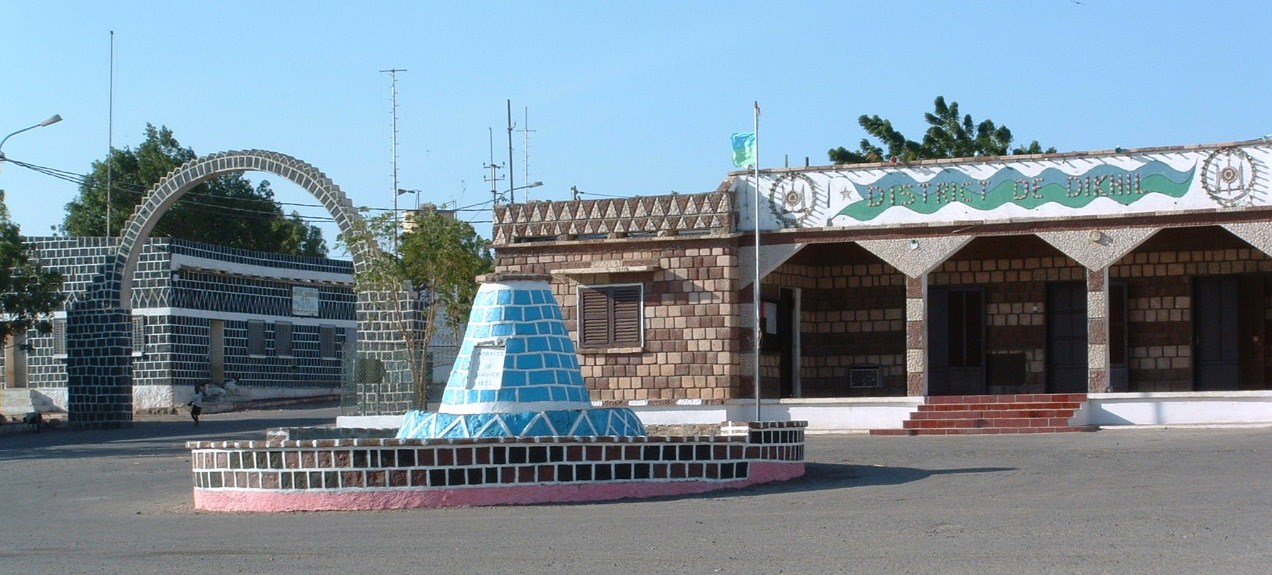
Bernard square

As an inland area, Dikhil's transportation system is largely road-based. For air transportation, the city is served by the Dikhil Airport.

== Economy ==
Dikhil is one of Djibouti's main agricultural areas, with the local economy largely centered around farming. The town serves as a commercial transit point for goods between Djibouti City and Ethiopia. The city was visited by more than 6,000 tourists over the years. Ethiopian trucks and traders frequently pass through the town.

== Climate ==
Dikhil is situated on a spur of a plateau in the Okarre Mountains.

Dikhil has a hot arid climate (Köppen: BWh) with hot and dry, prolonged summers and mild winters. However, due to the town's altitude and inland location, its climate features are the humidity is very low, and temperatures usually fall on 28 °C (82 °F) at night, which makes summer particularly pleasant compared to coastal cities. The rainy season extends from July to October. From November to February, the town experiences the mild winter season. It heats up from June to October, though the nights are pleasant. This elevation gives the settlement and the surrounding area a milder climate than the Djibouti city coastal area, where the weather is typically hot.

Climate data for Dikhil
Month	Jan	Feb	Mar	Apr	May	Jun	Jul	Aug	Sep	Oct	Nov	Dec	Year
Mean daily maximum °C (°F)	27.0 (80.6)	27.3 (81.1)	28.0 (82.4)	28.2 (82.8)	31.1 (88.0)	35.5 (95.9)	38.0 (100.4)	37.5 (99.5)	33.4 (92.1)	29.3 (84.7)	28.2 (82.8)	27.5 (81.5)	30.9 (87.6)
Mean daily minimum °C (°F)	17.2 (63.0)	18.8 (65.8)	20.0 (68.0)	21.6 (70.9)	23.3 (73.9)	25.5 (77.9)	27.0 (80.6)	26.3 (79.3)	25.5 (77.9)	22.2 (72.0)	19.4 (66.9)	17.7 (63.9)	22.0 (71.7)
Average precipitation mm (inches)	7 (0.3)	8 (0.3)	10 (0.4)	28 (1.1)	9 (0.4)	3 (0.1)	29 (1.1)	41 (1.6)	38 (1.5)	8 (0.3)	6 (0.2)	2 (0.1)	189 (7.4)
Source: Climate-Data.org, altitude: 482m

== Notable people ==
- Daher Ahmed Farah, Djiboutian politician
- Ougoureh Kifleh Ahmed, Djiboutian politician

== Sister towns ==
Country	Town
Yemen	Dhamar
Argentina	Pichanal
