= Dir (clan) =

Somali clan family

Dir در
Regions with significant populations
- Somalia, Djibouti, Ethiopia, Kenya, Somaliland, Saudi Arabia

Languages
- Somali

Religion
- Islam (Sunni)

The Dir (Somali: Dir) is one of the largest and most prominent Somali clans in the Horn of Africa. They are also considered to be the oldest Somali stock to have inhabited the region. Its members inhabit Djibouti, Somalia, Ethiopia (Somali, Harar, Dire Dawa, Oromia and Afar regions), and northeastern Kenya (North Eastern Province).

== Origins ==
Like the great majority of Somali clans, the Dir trace their ancestry to Aqil ibn Abi Talib (c. 580 – 670 or 683), a cousin of the prophet Muhammad (c. 570 – 632) and an older brother of Ali ibn Abi Talib (c. 600 – 661) and Ja'far ibn Abi Talib (c. 590 – 629). They trace their lineage to Aqil through Samaale (the source of the name 'Somali'), the purported forefather of the northern pastoralist clans such as the Dir, the Hawiye, and –matrilineally through the Dir– the Isaaq and the Darod. Although these genealogical claims are historically untenable legends, they do reflect the longstanding cultural contacts between Somalia (especially, though not exclusively, its most northern part Somaliland) and Southern Arabia.

== History ==
The history of Islam being practised by the Dir clan goes back 1400 years. In Zeila, a cosmopolitan city, a mosque called Masjid al-Qiblatayn is known as the site of where early companions of the Prophet established a mosque shortly after the first Migration to Abyssinia By the 7th century, a large-scale conversion to Islam was taking place in the Somali peninsula.

The early Adal Kingdom (9th century to 13th century) was an exclusive kingdom with its capital being Zeila. In the 10th century, the Jarso clan a sub-division of Dir established the Dawaro Sultanate centred in Hararghe Highlands.

Dir is one of the oldest clans in the Horn of Africa. According to the Muslim chronicles, two of the oldest monarchies in the northern region, the Ifat and Adal sultanates, were led by Dir.

The Dir, along with the Akisho, Gurgura, Issa and Gadabuursi subclans of the Dir represent the most native and indigenous Somali clan tree in Harar.

The city Dire Dawa was originally called Dir Dhabe and used to be part of Adal Sultanate during the medieval times and was exclusively settled by Dir which is a major Somali tribe and after the weakening of Adal Sultanate, the Oromos took advantage and were able to penetrate through the city and settle into these areas and also assimilate some of the local Gurgura clan.

The Somali Dir clan inhabit the Hararghe Highlands in the medieval times until the weakening of Adal Sultanate the Oromos took advantage of the crippling state and decided to invade and occupy the Haraghe Highlands and assimilate the local native Somali population which were Gurgura and Bursuk who were all sub-clans of Dir a major Somali tribe tree and were later confederated into Oromo Ethnics, the Afran Qallo tribes .

The Dir were supporters of Imam Ahmad ibn Ibrahim al-Ghazi during his 16th century conquest of Abyssinia; especially the Gurgura, Bursuk and Gadabuursi. In his medieval Futuh al-Habasha documenting this campaign, the chronicler Shihāb al-Dīn indicates that thousands of Dir soldiers took part in Imam Ahmad's Adal Sultanate army.

The Dir clan also led a revolt against the Italians during the colonial period. This revolt was mainly led by the Biimaal section of the Dir. The Biimaal clan is widely known for leading a resistance against the colonials in southern Somalia.The Biimaal violently resisted the imposition of colonialism and fought against the Italian colonialists of Italian Somaliland in a twenty-year war known as the Bimal revolt in which many of their warriors assassinated several Italian governors. This revolt can be compared to the war of the Mad Mullah in Somaliland. The Biimaal mainly lives in Somalia, the Somali region of Ethiopia, which their Gaadsen sub-clan mainly inhabits and in the NEP region of Kenya. The Biimaal are pastoralists. They were also successful merchants and traders in the 19th century. In the 19th century they have engaged in multiple wars with the Geledi clan, which they were victorious in.

== Lineage ==
I.M. Lewis and many sources maintain that the Dir, a Proto-Somali, together with the Hawiye trace ancestry through Irir son of Samaale. Dir is regarded as the father-in-law of Darod, the progenitor of the Darod clan Although some sources state it was the daughter of Hawiye who Darod married.

Dir clan lineages:

- Madahweyne Dir - Akisho, (Gurre), Gurgura, Jaarso and Barsuug
- Madaluug Dir - Gadabuursi
- Madoobe Dir - Issa
- Mahe Dir - Biimaal, Surre and Quranyow-Garre

According to others, Dir had a fifth son, Qaldho Dir.

DNA analysis of Dir clan members inhabiting Djibouti found that all of the individuals belonged to the Y-DNA T1 paternal haplogroup.

== Branches ==
The main subclans of the Dir today are: 1. Mahe 2. Madaluug 3. Madoobe 4. Madahweyne

- Akisho
- Issa "Essa"
- Bimaal "Bimal"
- Gadabuursi "Gadabursi"
- Jaarso "Jaarso"
- Surre
- Quranyow of the Garre
- Gurgura "Gurgure"
- Gariire "Gerire"
- Gurre "Goora"
- Bajimal "Bajumal"
- Barsuug "Bursuk"

For the first time since several centuries the Dir clan which widely dispersed in the Horn of Africa has successfully convened a meeting with all the major Dir subclans in Addis Ababa, Ethiopia. Suldaan Dhawal, of the Habr 'Affan Gadabuursi was elected the head and representative of the Dir clan in the Horn of Africa.

== Notable Dir figures ==
- Ahmed Shide, current minister of finance of Ethiopia.
- Abdi Hassan Buni, politician, minister of British Somaliland and first deputy prime minister of the Somali Republic.
- Abdi Ismail Samatar, Somali scholar, writer and professor.
- Ahmad-Naaji Ibrahim Bakal, Charge d’ Affaires a.i. of the League of Arab States in South Africa.
- Abdi Sinimo, a Somali singer and songwriter, noted for having established the balwo genre of Somali music.
- Abdi Warsame Isaq, chairman of the Southern Somali National Movement.
- Abdikarim Yusuf Adam, previous leader of Somali National Army
- Abdirahman Aw Ali Farrah, first Somaliland Vice President between 1993 and 1997.
- Abdirahman Beyle, former Foreign Affairs Minister of Somalia an economist
- Abdirahman Ibbi, former Deputy Prime Minister of Somalia, Minister of Information and is serving as Member of the Federal Parliament of Somalia.
- Abdirahman Sayli'i, current vice-president of Somaliland
- Abdo Hamargoodh, Djiboutian musician
- Said Hamargoodh, Djiboutian musician
- Abdourahman Waberi, novelist
- Abdullahi Sheikh Ismail, former Somali Ambassador to Russian federation and former foreign minister
- Abdusalam Hadliye, Foreign Affairs Minister of Somalia; former Governor of the Central Bank of Somalia
- Aden Isaq Ahmed, Minister and Politician of the Somali Republic
- Aden Robleh Awaleh, president of the National Democratic Party.
- Aden Nuriye, part of the prominent Ambassadorial Brothers, and former Djiboutian ambassador and current adviser to the President of Djibouti
- Ahmed Gerri of the Habar Maqdi (Makadi)/Makadur of the Conquest of Abyssinia
- Ahmed Boulaleh, Djiboutian politician
- Ahmed Gabobe, Minister of Justice and Religious Affairs of Somalia.
- Ahmed Ismail Samatar, Somali writer, professor and former dean of the Institute for Global Citizenship at Macalester College. Editor of Bildhaan: An International Journal of Somali Studies
- Ato Hussein Ismail. Ethiopian long-serving Statesman and first Somali to become member of the Ethiopian Parliament
- Ato Shemsedin, Somali Ethiopian Politician, previous Ethiopian ambassador to Djibouti, Kenya, Deputy Minister of Mining and Energy and first Vice Chairman and one of the founders of ESDL
- Ayanleh Souleiman, Djiboutian athlete
- Barkhad Awale Adan, Somali journalist and director of Radio Hurma
- Daher Ahmed Farah, Djiboutian politician
- Dahir Riyale Kahin, third President of Somaliland
- Djama Ali Moussa. First Senator of Djibouti or French Somaliland
- Djama Rabile, a Somali statesman of the former Somali Republic and Somali Democratic Republic.
- Haji Ibrahim Nur, minister, merchant and politician of former British Somaliland Protectorate
- Hassan Gouled Aptidon (1916–2006), first President of Djibouti from 1977 to 1999.
- Hassan Mead, American distance runner
- Hassan Sheikh Mumin, author of Shabeel Naagood or (Leopard among the Women)
- Hibo Nura, a Somali singer
- Hussein Ahmed Salah, Djiboutian marathon runner.
- Ismaïl Omar Guelleh, current President of Djibouti
- Ismail Nuriye, part of the prominent Ambassadorial Brothers, and former Ethiopian ambassador
- Khadija Qalanjo, a popular Somali singer
- Mahmoud Harbi, vice-president of the Government Council of French Somaliland.
- Ahmed Goumane-Roble: Djiboutian Politician
- Mawlid Hayir, current vice-president and minister of education and former governor of Jigjiga zone of the Somali region of Ethiopia.
- Mohamed Fourchette, Djiboutian musician
- Lula Ali Ismaïl, Djiboutian-Canadian film director
- Aden Farah Samatar, Djiboutian Musician
- Moumina Houssein Darar, Djiboutian Anti-Terrorism police investigator.
- Aden Farah, Speaker of House of Federation - Ethiopia
- Fadumo Ahmed Dhimbiil, Djiboutian Musician
- Xabiiba Cabdilaahi, Djiboutian Musician
- Mohamed Dubad, Somali politician, served as member of Somalia parliament and Charge D'Affaires in the United Nations
- Mohamed Nuriye, part of the prominent Ambassadorial Brothers, and former ambassador for Somalia.
- Moumin Bahdon, Djiboutian politician.
- Mumin Gala, Djiboutian athlete
- Col. Muse Rabile Ghod, a Somali military leader and statesman of the Somali Democratic Republic.
- Nima Djama, Djiboutian musician
- Hussein Ahmed Salah, Djiboutian marathon runner.
- Omar Farah Iltireh, Djiboutian politician
- Omar Osman Rabe, Somali scholar, writer, professor, politician and pan-Somalist.
- Roble Olhaye, permanent representative to the United Nations for the Republic of Djibouti.
- Sheikh Yusuf Sheikh Ibrahim,
- Sheikh Yusuf Direed, Central Somalia Religious Leader
- Sheikh Abdi Abikar Gafle, famous religious leader and warrior
- Sheikh 'Abdurahman Sh. Nur, religious leader, qādi and the inventor of the Borama script.
- Suleiman Ahmed Guleid – President of Amoud University
- Sultan Dideh, sultan of Zeila, prosperous merchant and built first mosque in Djibouti. He also proposed the name "Cote francaise des Somalis" to the French
- Ughaz 'Elmi Warfa, 13th Malak (King) of the Gadabursi.
- Ughaz Nur II, 11th Malak (King) of the Gadabursi.
- Yacin Bouh, Djiboutian politician.
- Yussur Abrar, former governor of the Central Bank of Somalia.
- Yusuf Tallan, previous leader of Somali National Army
- Yusuf bin Ahmad al-Kawneyn

== Historical publications ==
- Bughyaat al-amaal fii taariikh as-Soomaal, published in Mogadishu, Shariif 'Aydaruus Shariif 'Ali
- Political History of Lower Shabelle, Dr. Mohamed Abukar Mahad (Gaetano)

== See also ==
- Somali aristocratic and court titles

== Notes ==
=== Sources ===
- Lewis, Ioan M. (1961). A Pastoral Democracy: A Study of Pastoralism and Politics Among the Northern Somali of the Horn of Africa. Oxford: Oxford University Press. ISBN 9780852552803.
- Lewis, Ioan M. (1994). Blood and Bone: The Call of Kinship in Somali Society. Lawrencewill, NJ: The Red Sea Press. ISBN 0-932415-93-8.
- Rubin, Uri (2009). "ʿAqīl b. Abī Ṭālib". In Fleet, Kate; Krämer, Gudrun; Matringe, Denis; Nawas, John; Rowson, Everett (eds.). Encyclopaedia of Islam, Three. doi:10.1163/1573-3912_ei3_COM_23073.
