= Issa (clan) =

Northern Somali clan

Issa بنو عيسي
- Dir Somali Clan
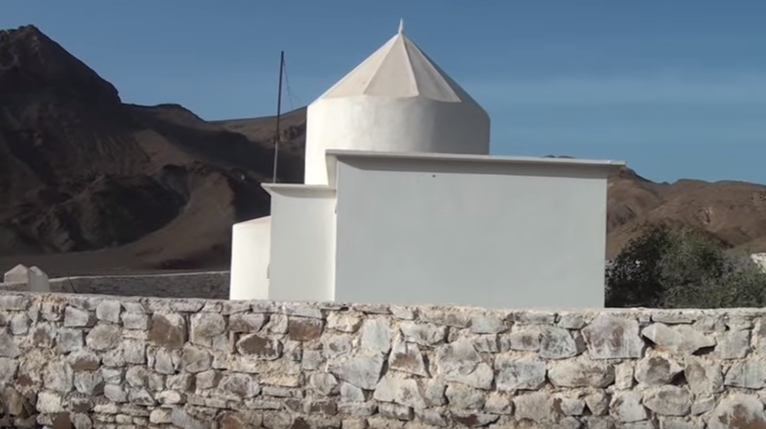
- The Tomb of Sheikh Issa in Sanaag
- Ethnicity: (Somalia) Somali
- Location: (Djibouti) Djibouti (Ethiopia) Ethiopia; Somalia
- Descended from: Issa
- Parent tribe: Dir
- Branches: Ēlēye' (Musse & Mamasan); Walaldon (Idleh & Youssouf); Hōlle (Mahadle & Saaib); Hōrrōne (Habar Walaal & Geele Walaal); Ūrweyne(Cabdelle & Siciid); Wardīq (Wakhtishiil & Rumawaaq)
- Language: (Somalia) Somali (Arab League) Arabic
- Religion: Sunni, Islam

The Issa (/ˈiːsɑː/; also spelled Esa, or Aysa) (Somali: Ciise, Arabic: عيسى) is a northern Somali clan, a sub-division of the Dir clan family.

== Overview ==
As a Dir sub-clan, the Issa have immediate lineal ties with the Gadabuursi, Akisho, the Surre (Abdalle and Qubeys), the Biimaal (who the Gaadsen also belong to), the Bajimal, the Bursuk, the Madigan Dir, the Gurgura, the Garre (the Quranyow sub-clan to be precise as they claim descent from Dir), Gurre, Gariire, other Dir sub-clans and they have lineal ties with the Hawiye (Irir), Hawadle, Ajuran, Degoodi, Gaalje'el clan groups, who share the same ancestor Samaale.

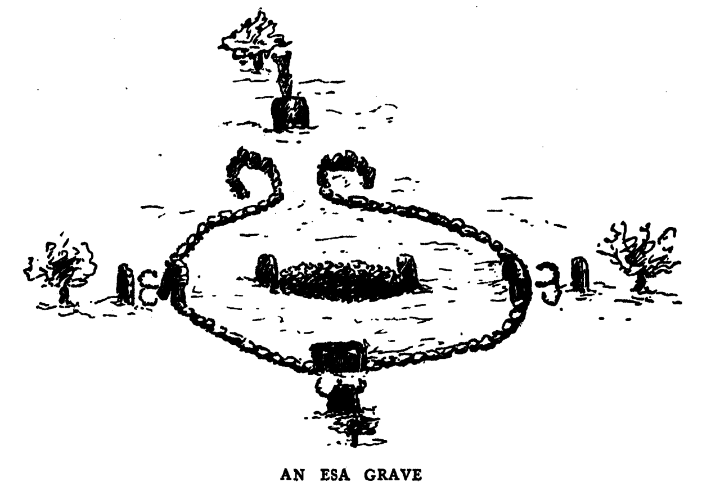
An Issa Grave

The Issa clan has produced numerous noble Somali men and women over the centuries, including multiple Kings (Ughaz). Throughout their known history the Issa were known for their military strength and viciousness, the British who came across them viewed the Issas as "one of the most fanatical and warlike tribes in north east Africa". The British also tried to invade Zeila home of the White Issa (Aysa) which the natives reigned victorious, with that there was never any attempt made to occupy the interior of the Issa country, which was mostly inhabited by the Black Issa; and not withstanding the cruel nature of the tribe, whose only aspirations in life could very accurately be summed up in the two words "Murder and Loot". With the typically villainous expression on their tribe members' faces as the British administration described. Tribal traditions with those of the Black Issa was that a young blood was not allowed to marry until he had slain a man in battle; as it was not essential to kill the man in a fair combat, this usually led to a cold-blooded killing and constant battles with neighboring tribes and ethnic groups, among the other Somali tribes such customs were unheard of, this was all in effort to keep themselves a militarized tribe. Known for their mastery in the use of poisoned arrows and their remarkable hunting abilities, the Issa stand out as a force to be reckoned with. In the lands of Arabia, they have become sought-after mercenaries, often enlisted for their combat prowess and strategic acumen. Given that they were always in a state of battle to the point it was viewed that killing was their pastime, as a way of honoring their deceased warriors, they would place upright stones, one for each victim, opposite the entrance of the deceased's dwelling. If the deceased had killed three or more men, stones would also be placed opposite each of the wives' three huts. If the deceased had killed one or more elephants, very large stones would be erected. Additionally, if any of the deceased's victims were mounted men, one upright stone surmounted by another flat stone would be put up. This practice of honoring their warriors through the placement of stones was a significant aspect of the Issa tribal traditions and culture.

== History ==
=== Early 19th Century, Northern Conflicts & Engagements of the Issa Tribe ===
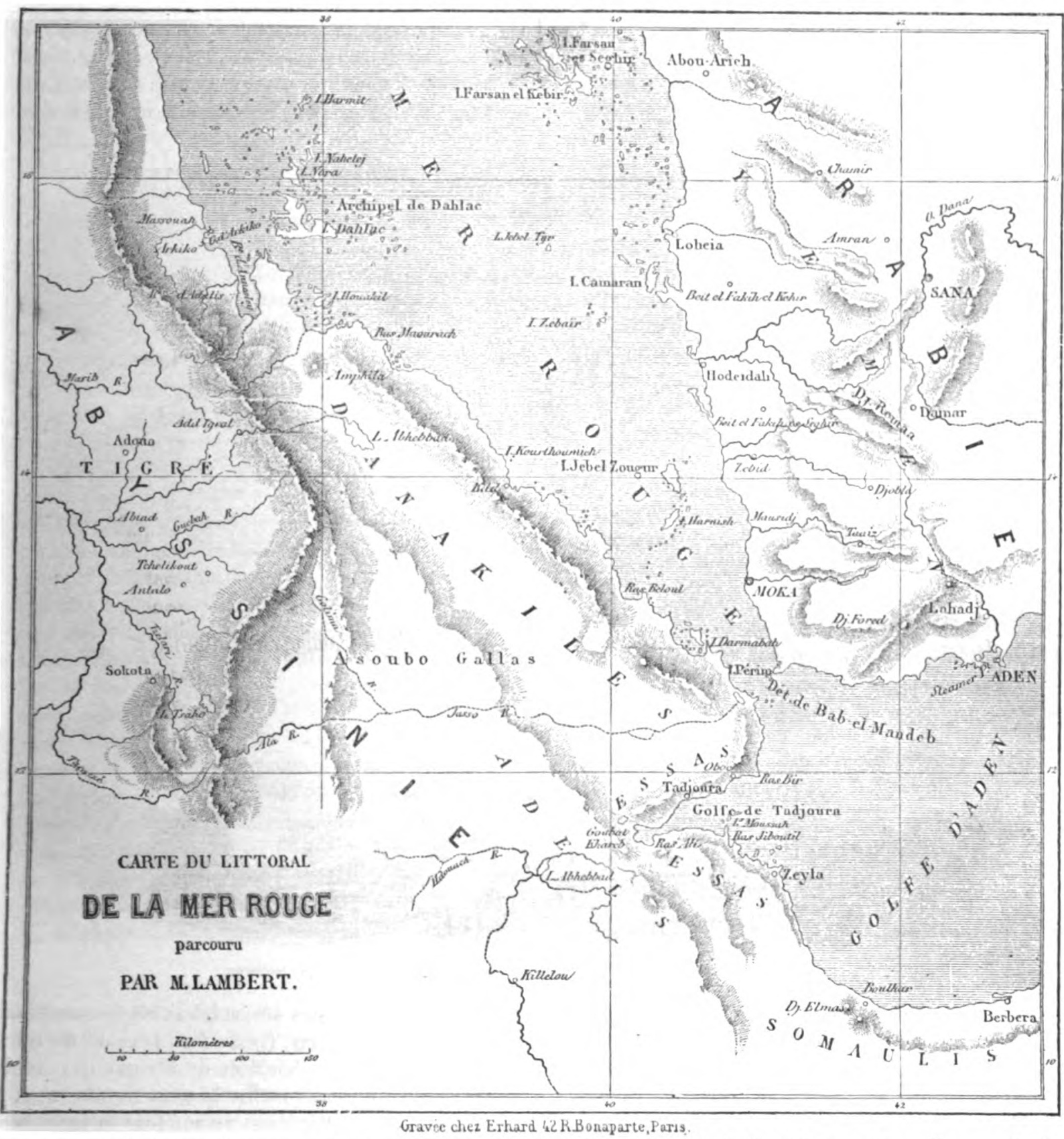
Henri Lambert's map of Horn of Africa in 1855, the Issa clan reign on both sides of the gulf of Tadjoura

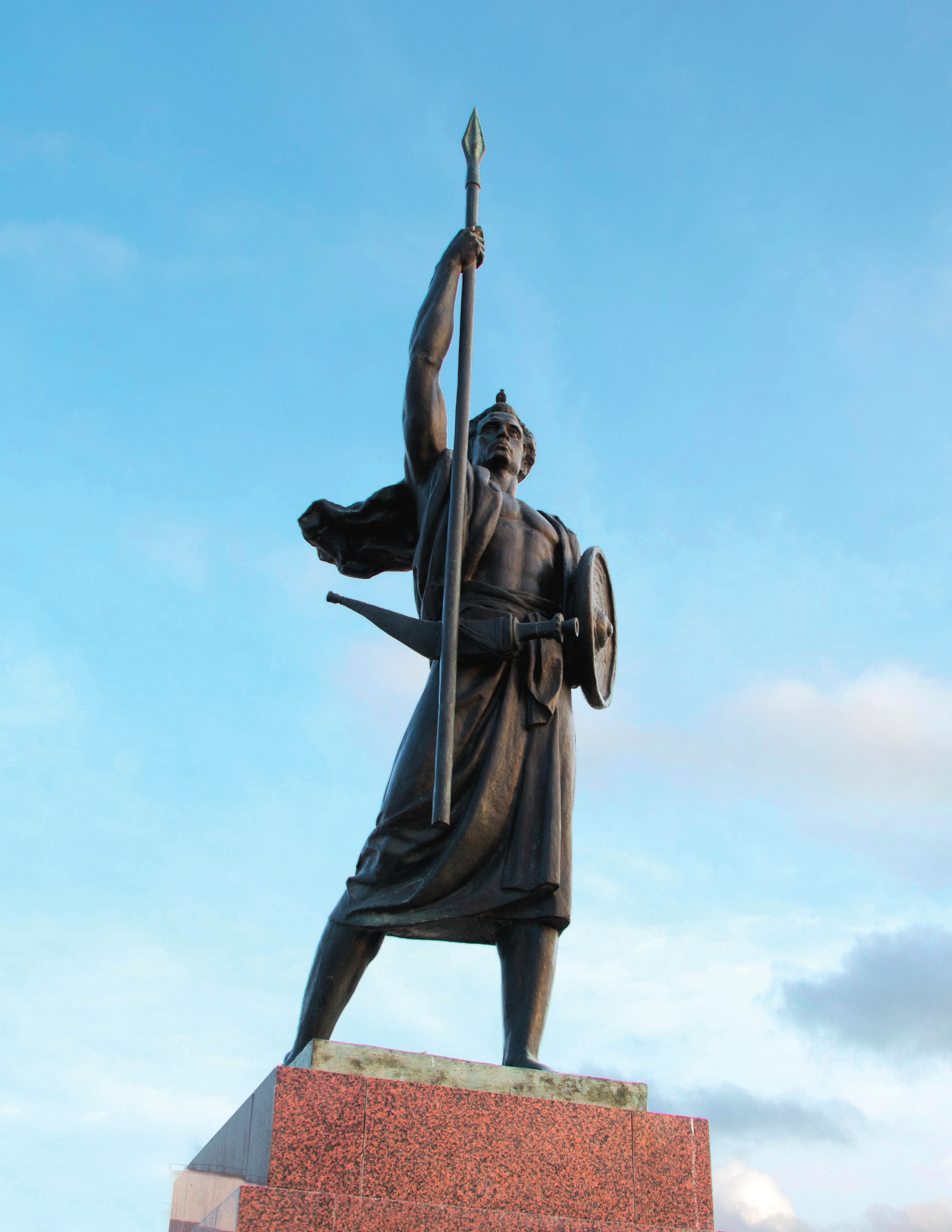
Issa military hero Ali Kalageeye

In the tumultuous era of warring Afar tribes, the Weima Danakil emerge as a prominent group maintaining a force of approximately 100 Somali archers, acting as mercenaries for various northwestern tribes, mostly the Issa. Despite attempts at assimilation, they steadfastly preserve their Somali language and prefer to intermarry within their own community, avoiding mixing with the Danakil at that time. Interestingly, the Danakil consider shooting to be unlawful and thus rely on the skilled Somalis to fulfill this role.

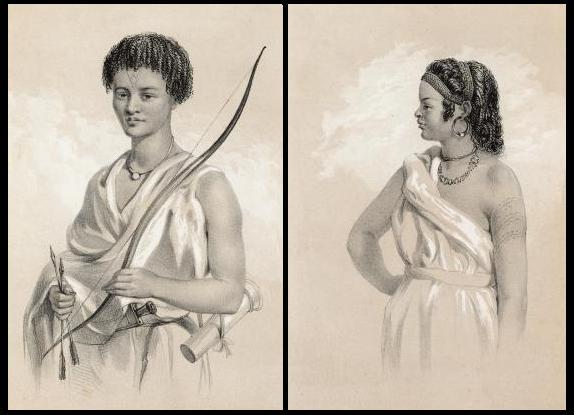
Issa man and woman in traditional attire (1844)

The Issa tradition endures with the continued utilization of bows and poisoned arrows among their ranks. In the preceding year, in 1838, a violent clash had occurred between the Debenik Weima and the Mudaito, resulting in a bloody skirmish. The casualties were substantial, with the Mudaito suffering 700 fatalities and the Debne Weima losing 140 individuals. There were discrepancies in the reported numbers, with Mahomed Ali stating that the Mudiato had 1500 casualties while the Weima had 120. During their conflicts, the Debne Weima consistently ally with the Issa against the Mudaito. In such cases, the Issa constitute approximately one-third of their combined forces.

Even so, with the Issa being against the Mudaito, it is noteworthy that the capital city of Aussa is predominantly inhabited by the Afar Mudaito having the city is divided into Assa-himera, Galeya, Dar, Koorha, and Issa. Centuries prior the Issa dynasty of Aussa faced rebellion from the Mudaitos, despite those events, the Issa still maintained a presence in Aussa, This observation was made by explorers Cornwallis and Harris R. Kirk in 1841.

Many of Issa inhabited territory the opposite coast of Ghoubbet-el-Kharab, driven by an insatiable thirst for human blood, frequently launch incursions into the territory of the Danakil. Exploiting the absence of a sentry at the far end of the beat, they stealthily descend the shaded bank of the hollow and commit the merciless act of violence. Engaged in ceaseless conflict with the Danakil, despite the outward appearance of friendship and even alliance among tribal chiefs, no opportunity is missed to retaliate against the mountain-dwelling Bedouins. Each fresh act of hostility sparks a new blood feud, with each life taken on either side demanding revenge twofold, perpetuating an endless cycle of violence.

While traveling from Tadjoura to the Ethiopian highlands of Shoa in 1841, explorer Major Y. Cornwallis Harris witnessed a harrowing ordeal. The protective escort accompanying him faced relentless attacks, with members being systematically targeted, picked off, and ultimately being killed he states the following:

"Eesah, whose only honour and wealth consists in the number of foul butcheries with which their consciences are stained, and whomeven savages concur in representing as sanguinary and ferocious monsters fearing neither God nor Devil"

Arabedoura, an expansive plateau formed by volcanic materials, is covered with lush grass that serves as grazing land for the Bedouin herds. During the rainy season, the Bedouins, including the Issa nomads, migrate and settle in this region. Issa nomads can be found camping alongside the Danakiles on the pastures, as reported by explorer Rochet d'Hericourt in 1841. The Issa nomads' territory, located three leagues south of Arabedoura. Due to the asynchronous arrival of the rainy seasons in these territories, a reciprocal agreement allows the Issa nomads to bring their herds to graze among the Danakiles when vegetation flourishes with abundant rainfall. In return, the Danakils lead their cattle to the Issa nomads when their own pastures have dried up, and the rains commence to nourish their neighbors' lands. This interdependence fosters harmony between the two prominent tribes. Without this arrangement, their alliance could be endangered, potentially favoring the Issa nomads, renowned for their martial nature and remarkable archery skills, demonstrated by their adept use of bows to shoot arrows. Rochet d'Hericourt goes on to state :

"The Somalis Issa, who are of a very fine race: their height is tall, their nose is almost aquiline; a large forehead with regular lines gives to their characteristic face the physical attributes of intelligence; endowed with fiery courage, they love battles, where their skill in throwing the arrow gives them a great superiority over their neighbors, who fear them."

In 1842, the Issa Somali people reside in the southern region of the Gulf of Tadjoura, extending to the territory of Weima Danakil. It is worth noting that a significant portion of the Issa Somali population recognizes Lohitu, the Sultan of Tadjoura, as their chief. Additionally, it is noteworthy that half of the Weima tribe in Tadjoura consists of Issa Somali individuals.

=== Mid 19th Century ===
The Issa were the most significant component in the trade routes that connected Harar to the coastal towns of Berbera and Zeila. The trade and agricultural ties of the Somali tribes with the Afran-Qallo contributed, from the fifteenth century, to political and ethnic merging, expressed in the creation of the Oromo-Somali ethnic groups: the Girri-Jarso and the Girri-Babillee, which combined Oromo methods of agriculture while adopting Somali political institutions. The development of Somali institutions was intricately linked to the trading activities of the Issa tribe in the Zeila region. In this area, the Issa provided protection to merchants and their wares traveling along the trade routes between Zeila and the interior regions of the country. In exchange for their services, the tribe collected taxes from the traders. This arrangement helped to institutionalize and refine the role of the Abban(tribal chief) who was responsible for ensuring the welfare and safety of his people.

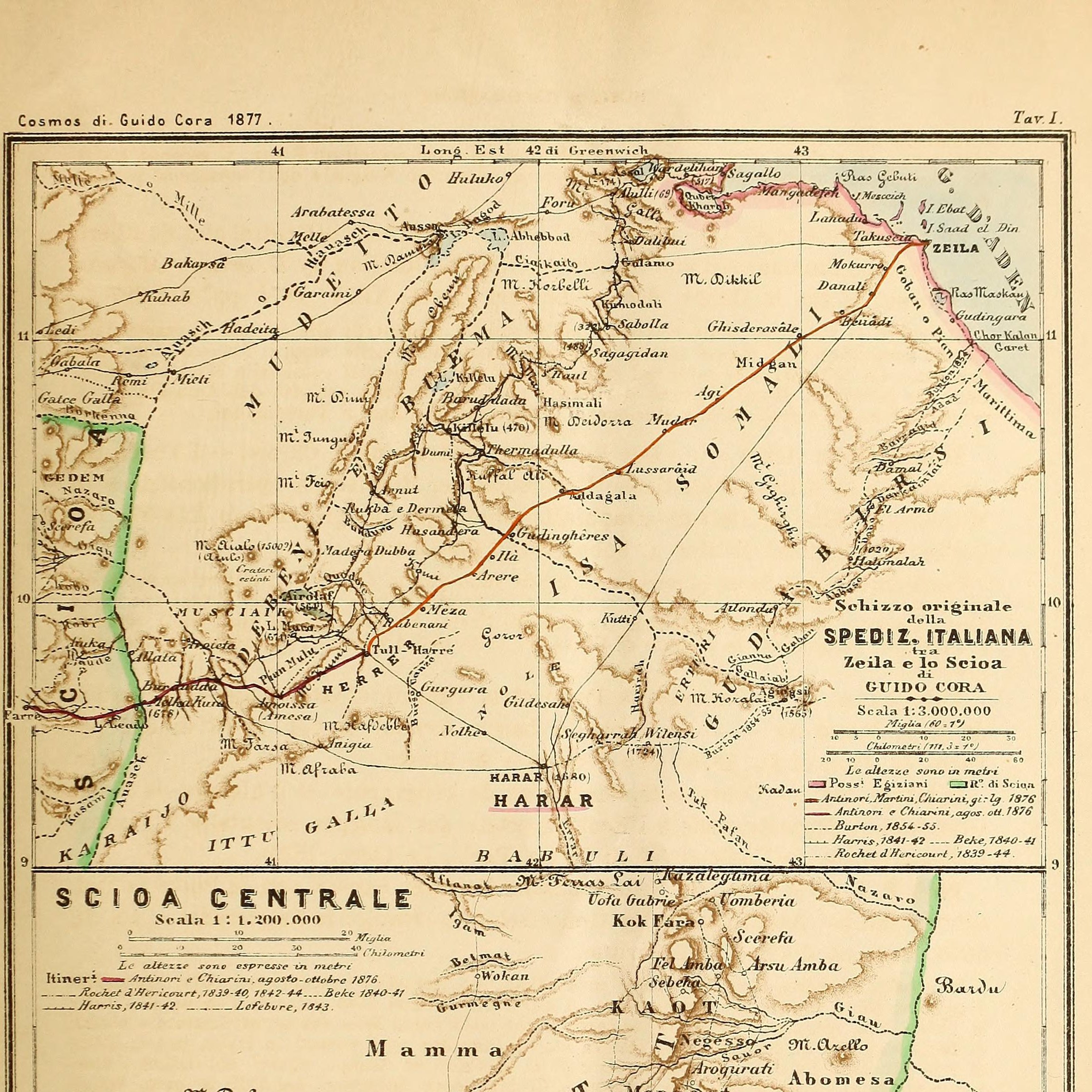
An Issa trade route from Zeila to Harar

Over time, the Abban's duties and responsibilities became more formalized and well-defined, as he had to manage the economic and political affairs of his tribe, negotiate with other tribes, and ensure the security of his people and their property. Thus, the trade activities of the Issa tribe played a significant role in the development of the social and political structures of the Somali people. The Issa tribe held a virtual monopoly on camel raising in the region, and they were responsible for renting out these animals and leading convoys through the Oromo regions. However, the camels owned by the Issa were not well-suited for the hilly terrain leading up to Harar. To navigate this terrain, it was necessary to use donkeys provided by the Oromo.

=== Issa - Egypt conflict, late 19th Century ===
In the mid-1870s after Khedivate of Egypt defeats in Ethiopia, they changed strategy to encircle Ethiopia from all sides and also gain a foothold on the Somali coast. In early 1875, Egyptian forces led by Werner Munzinger aimed to join forces with Menelik by traveling westward from the port of Tadjoura towards Awassa. However, the challenging topographical conditions and harsh climate depleted the troops' energy. On the night of November 14, warriors from the Somali Issa Madoobe tribe attacked the Egyptian force, resulting in the massacre of Werner Munzinger, his wife, and most of the military command. The remaining survivors escaped to Tadjoura. This defeat marked the end of the ambition to expand Egypt into the Christian Abyssinia.

Despite their previous defeats Egyptian eventually took control of the Somali coastal cities of Zeila and Berbera was successful. In exchange, Khedive Isma‘īl made pledges to keep the ports of Bulhar and Berbera open to trade with all countries, with the exception of slave trade, and to prevent European military presence in these ports. The khedival government also agreed to charge customs rates that did not exceed 5 percent of the value of exported merchandise, and to allow the British to establish consular representation in those areas. In the summer of 1875 the Egyptians appointed Abu Bakr Ibrahim Shahim, a slave trader from Zeila, as governor. Abu Bakr, apparently a descendent of the ‘Afar people, had a great deal of local influence. Abu-Bakr having ties to Menelik II was a great benefit to Khedive in Cairo and was highly valued by the French in the area. It is likely that they granted him French citizenship in the early 1860s and appointed him as their representative in exchange for the benefits he provided to their merchants in the Zeila and Obock region. With French citizenship, Abu Bakr solidified his status as the most influential leader of the Zeila region in the eyes of both the Afar people and the European powers. The Egyptians did not intervene in Somali affairs, rather they adhered to their agreement with Abu Bakr and utilized bribes to influence tribal leaders, commonly referred to as Ugas in Zeila. To establish their authority, they appointed leaders from the Issa and other Somali tribes in the Ogaden Desert region southeast of Harar as their authorized representatives. Along with territory from Zelia to Harar, the Issa controlled Zeila and majority of the Somali coast to Bulhar, the Khedivites used to pay tax to the ugaas of the Issa to use Zeila and Harar trade route.

Continuing onto Harar, the Egyptians had to go through the territory of the Issa Somalis, they marched through rocky gullies and dry river beds in the Guban region, which typically experiences scorching temperatures ranging from 105 to 110 degrees Fahrenheit from May to September. The area had limited vegetation and scarce water resources due to the harsh summer conditions. Issa people had an advantage over the invading army, they were familiar with the difficult field conditions and climate, as noted, wiped out Munzinger’s forces in the middle of 1875 in Awassa. With only a limited number of matchlocks, or ‘Tower’-type percussion muskets, along with their traditional light arms, which included lances, daggers, javelins, a spear, sword, and shield. Some employed clubs, bows, hatchets, or, rarely, a pistol, despite the antiquated arsenal, Issa clans were not easy opponents . In comparison, the military force that Ra’uf Pasha of the Egyptians commanded was made up of five infantry units, each unit had fourteen officers, 236 soldiers ( başhi bozuķ ), two Howitzer mountain cannons, and two rocket launchers. At the same time, the Issa tribe was engaged in conflicts with Nole Oromo, the Danakil (Afar) and Gadabuursi clans, with that taken into consideration after a 5-day stand off the leader of the federation of the Somali Issa tribes, Sheikh Rolia, surrendered to the Egyptian forces and was granted protection and the Egyptian flag in return. This eliminated the military threat posed to the Egyptians by the Somali Issa, allowing them to proceed towards Harar by crossing the Issa territory. British observers stationed in Aden sent reports to London, highlighting the ability the invading force had to use to compel the Issa to surrender, as they were the first to do so.

The Egyptians divided the societies in the Harar area into three categories: the Somali ‘Issa, the Nole Oromo, and the people of the city of Harar, with the Issa causing the Egypt administration much difficulty.

They have no stable leader, except for the leader of the sheikhs of the ‘Issa dignitaries. The government that they set up for themselves is a type of commonwealth. When they want to bring down the government, they undermine its authority. Their wise men and heads of clans assemble. They consult with one another, and sometimes this goes on for many weeks. When the majority opinion is accepted, the government carries it out. This is how the appointment or the dismissal of their dignitaries is carried out.

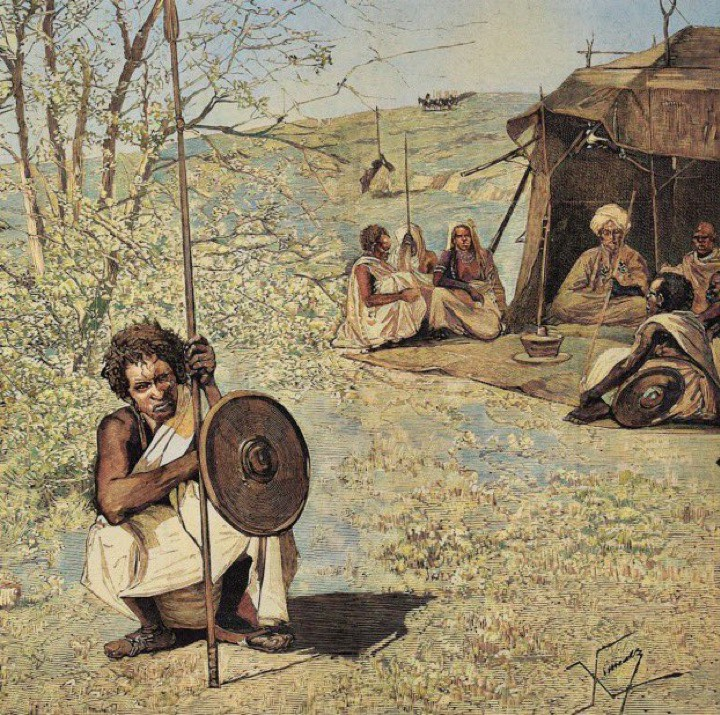
Issa Somali stands guard outside the abode of Ugaas Robleh Farah at Jaldessa

Between June and July 1878, the security situation in the region spanning from Harar to the Somali coast worsened significantly due to an uprising by the Somali 'Issa populations. The unrest, which initially erupted in the Berber area, eventually spread to the Harar region. In July 1878, Raduan Pasha and his deputy, Ahmad Rami Bey, attempted to suppress the uprising of several hundred rebels. However, they underestimated the strength of the rebel forces, who managed to surprise and defeat the small Egyptian army. The rebels then fled towards Zeila. In response, the Egyptians retaliated by invading deserted villages and burning the homes of ten tribal leaders. According to Raduan Pasha's assessment, the garrison force stationed in the city and surrounding areas would be unable to contain a widespread 'Issa rebellion. He alerted the khedival government to the danger and emphasized the urgent need for military reinforcements in Harar. Raduan Pasha demanded the return of the Egyptian warship, which had been stationed in the Berbera area until early 1878 but was ordered to leave by the khedival government. The ship carried two units tasked with providing support to forces in the region between coastal cities and Harar. Issa rebels achieved the area between Harar and the Somali coast to slip out of Egyptian control. Khiri Pasha's government was considering the option of re-annexing the Red Sea coastal region and Harar to the hikimdariya of Sudan. Raduan Pasha attempted to attack the rebel strongholds in the Harar region in October 1878 but faced another significant defeat. The rebels managed to kill twenty-six soldiers and loot twenty-nine guns and thirty-eight horses from Raduan Pasha's force. In November 1878, Raduan Pasha led a small force of fifty soldiers and one cannon from Zeila to Harar to negotiate with the rebel leaders. However, when they failed to arrive in the city, he traveled to their villages to meet with them. Raduan Pasha's calm and attentive approach towards the tribes played a key role in pacifying the rebellion. After a meeting at the rebels' stronghold outside Harar, Raduan Pasha negotiated with their leaders and agreed on reduced and graded taxes. In exchange, the rebels signed a ceasefire agreement in which they pledged to allow transportation to the coast and even return their plundered loot. Raduan Pasha reported his success to Gordon, who in turn informed the khedive's government that order had been restored and there was no need for any military reinforcement. The ceasefire achieved through Raduan Pasha's negotiations with the rebels was short-lived, and by early March 1879, it was clear that transportation on the roads was once again dangerous. The rebels had taken this as a sign of weakness and were joined by additional Somali tribes in their rebellion. They targeted convoys, damaged telegraph lines, and cut off communication with coastal cities. Raduan Pasha requested military reinforcement from the khedival government and a force of about 1,500 regular soldiers, along with other Somali tribes opposing the Issa tribe, arrived quickly by sea to Zeila. With this backup, Raduan Pasha led a successful attack against the rebels, defeating their force of about 370 armed men. Following this, the Somali 'Issa did not pose a significant threat again until the Egyptians evacuated Harar in 1885.

The Egyptian withdrawal from Harar was synchronized with their departure from Zelia and Berbera, as a precautionary measure to avoid a potential uprising by the Oromo and Issa Somali against the retreating Egyptian forces. Thomas Hunter, the first secretary of the British delegate in Aden from 1884 to 1887 was apprehensive that during the withdrawal, the tribal factions might launch surprise attacks on the Egyptians from behind, which could trigger a fresh Mahdiyya rebellion like the one witnessed in Sudan. Egypts leave of Horn of Africa, expressed concern from the British about the sense of unease in Berbera and the possibility of the Somali Issa tribe taking over the city. To prevent this, Thomas Hunter suggested that a British warship, under the leadership of a naval officer based in Aden, should remain stationed in Berbera's harbor on a permanent basis. This move would serve as a deterrent to the Somali Issa until the evacuation of Harar was completed. To prevent another Issa revolt, Thomas Hunter recommended that the British rule over Zeila while the Egyptian forces were still there, by means of 150 local infantrymen reinforced with camels. Afterwards, from a state of military advantage, they would arrive at an agreement with the Issa regarding the evacuation from Harar, and that no difficulties were expected on the routes, due to assistance provided by the Somali ‘Issa populations. With Egypt gone, the Somalis soon began to plunder and massacre European commercial convoys: ‘Issa warriors murdered 103 Europeans and locals in the roads between Harar, Zeila and Berbera'. Simultaneously with these attacks, which were directed against foreigners, a bloody conflict broke out during November 1885 between the Somali ‘Issa and the Gadabuursi about control of the trade routes between Harar and Zeila. Twenty were killed during the fighting, and the security condition on the routes was severely weakened. Then following in 1886 the Issa and Afars were at war, and all caravans trading paths were deserted from Zeila going through to Awsa.

=== 20th Century–present ===
In the Italian invasion of Ethiopia in 1935/36, Issa fought on the Italian side, in return benefited from weapons and military training and lucrative marketing opportunities for their cattle. In the second half of the twentieth century, Somalia supplied additional weapons to the Issa, which it upgraded as part of the West Somalia Liberation Front.

The Aysha massacre was a massacre of ethnic Issa Somalis by Ethiopian army on 13 August 1960 in Aysha, Ethiopia. The Ethiopian troops had descended on the area to reportedly help defuse clan-related conflict. However, according to eye-witness testimony, that Somali men were then taken to a different location and then executed by Ethiopian soldiers. Among the latter, those who fled to Dikhil and Ali Sabieh in Djibouti. The drought and hunger crisis of 1972-1973/74 intensified the conflicts. The Ethiopian army intervened against the Issa and in 1971/72 killed hundreds and seized nearly 200,000 cattle. After the defeat of the Western Somali Liberation Front, the Issa Division remained under the name Issa and Gurgura Liberation Front. They continued to receive support from Somalia and joined the EPRDF. In 1987 the autonomous region of Dire Dawa was created for the Issa (which had previously belonged to the province of Xararge) as part of a new administrative division of Ethiopia. Since the EPRDF took over in 1991, the Issa areas in Ethiopia were part of the ethnic definition of the Somali Region.

In Djibouti, which was colonized by France under the name of the French Coast of Somalis, (up until 1967, then to the French Territory of the Afars and the Issas), there were also tensions between Issa and Afar, as the Issa and other Somalis natives of Djibouti sought to connect with Somalia independent since 1960. Most Afar preferred the fate of France. Mahamoud Harbi was a major leader of the independence movement but was killed on 29 September 1960 and his comrades Djama Mahamoud Boreh and Mohamed Gahanlo disappeared on a flight from Geneva to Cairo. Officially, they were killed in a plane crash, but a possible role of the organization de l'armée secrète is speculated. In 1977 Djibouti gained its independence, but did not unite with Somalia. During the Ogaden War, influential Issa politicians envisioned a Greater Djibouti or "Issa-land", where Djibouti's borders would extend from the Red Sea to Dire Dawa. That dream however was dashed towards the end of the war as Somali forces were routed from Ethiopia. Under Hassan Gouled Aptidon, Djibouti developed into the one-party state of the Rassemblement Populaire pour le Progrès (RPP) In which the interests of the Afar minority were little considered. In 1991–1994, there was therefore a civil war in Djibouti between the Issa-dominated government and the Afar rebels of the FRUD. Finally, other opposition parties were admitted and Afar was involved in the government, while Issa still dominated political life. In 1999 Ismail Omar Guelleh, a nephew of Hassan Gouled Aptidon, succeeded Djibouti as his successor.

In the Awdal region of Somaliland there were battles with the Gadabuursi, another Dir subclans. The conflict drove some of the Issa to escape to Ethiopia in the late 1990s. A refugee camp was opened at Degago/Ayisha. A second wave of Issa refugees left the coastal town of Zeila in 1991 after fighting with the SNM of the Isaaq and Gadabuursi.

== Distribution ==
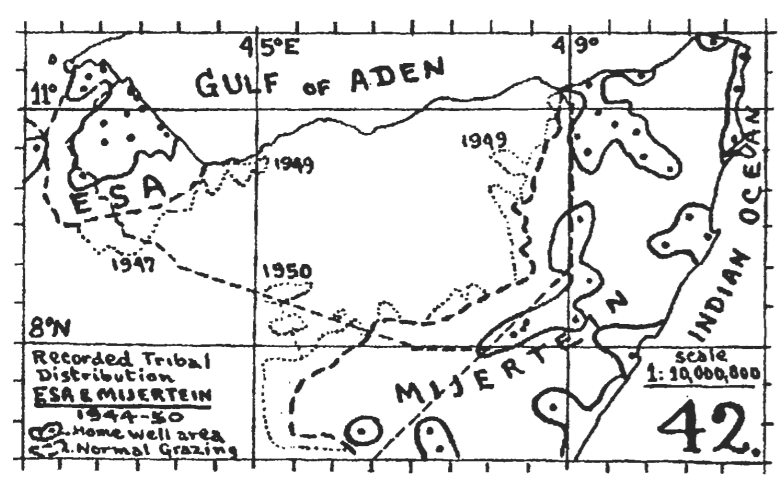
Map of Northern Somali peninsula showing distribution of the Issa clan in the north western part

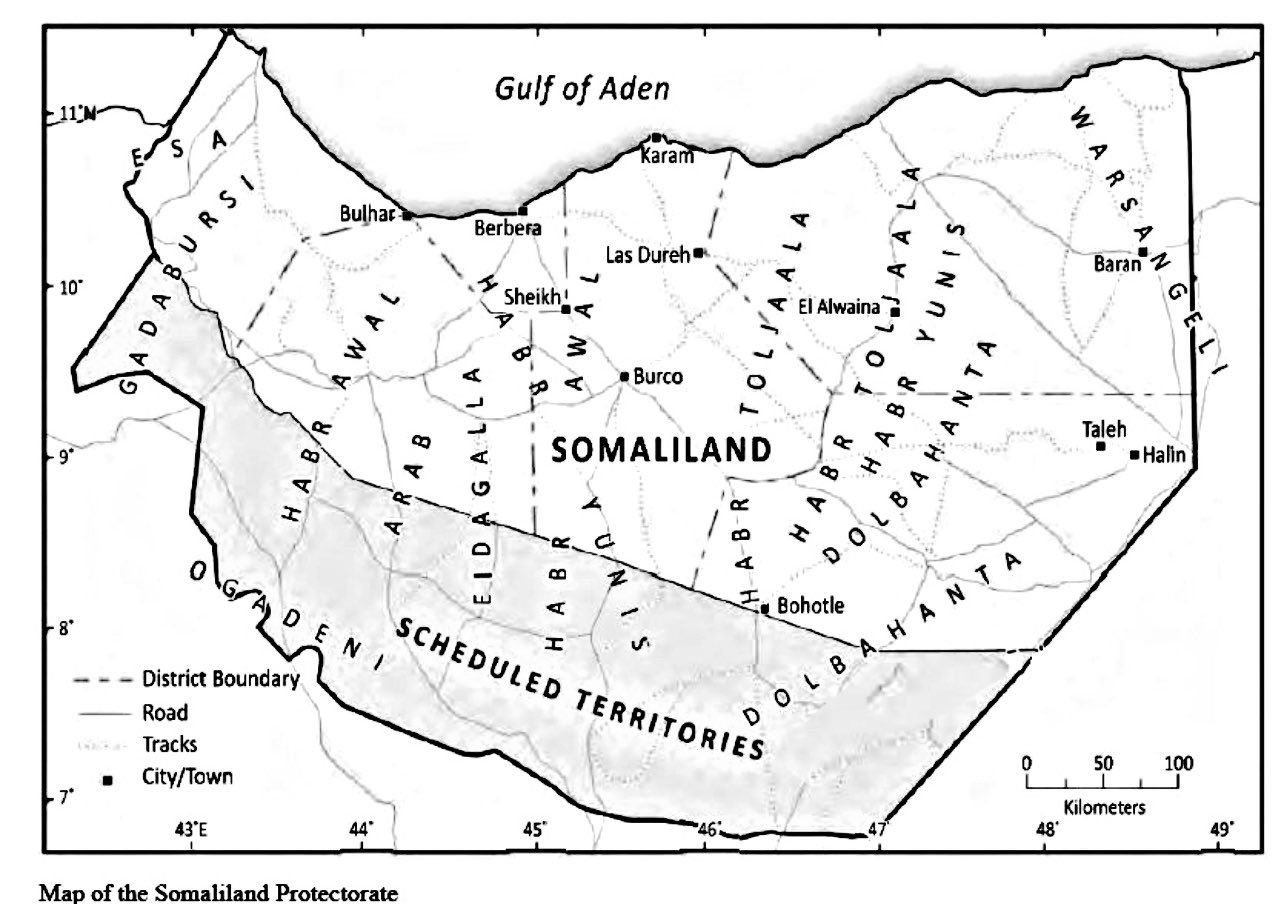
Map of Somaliland featuring the Issa clan.

The Issa primarily live in Ethiopia largely where they reach the Oromia and Afar regions and make a large chunk of the Chartered city of Dire Dawa. They also inhabit Djibouti, where they make up more than half of the population, thirdly they inhabit Awdal, Somaliland too. The Issa are the largest clan by population within the Djibouti. Also the Issa is the second largest sub-clan within the borders of the Somali Region of Ethiopia based on the Ethiopian population census 2008.

The immediate neighbor to the Issa to the west are the Afar (or Danakil) with whom the Issa used to frequently fight. I. M. Lewis used to refer to it as "an almost constant state of enmity between the 'Ise and the 'Afar", To their east the 'Ise are in contact with the Somali Gadabursi to whom they feel themselves akin and share same descent and culture. To the South the Gurgura, Hawiye and Oromo.

The titles White and Black, as prefixed to the Issa, simply refer to their geographic distribution; a range of hills that runs west of and parallel to the Djibouti-Harrar road serves as their dividing line; the White Issa are those closest to the sea, while the Black Issaare those beyond the range. These differences are due to how the two countries look, with the country to the west being almost entirely made up of sand and the country to the east being mostly covered in basaltic rock. As a result, the former has a black appearance due to its volcanic nature, while the latter is a white sandy desert. The Black Issa typically consist of the Wardiq, certain factions of Muse Eleye, the entirety of Horrone, and certain segments of Furlabe and Walaldon. The White Issa typically encompass some of Furlabe, a portion of Muse Eleye, and a portion of Mamassan, along with some Walaldon.

== The customary law Xeer & administration ==
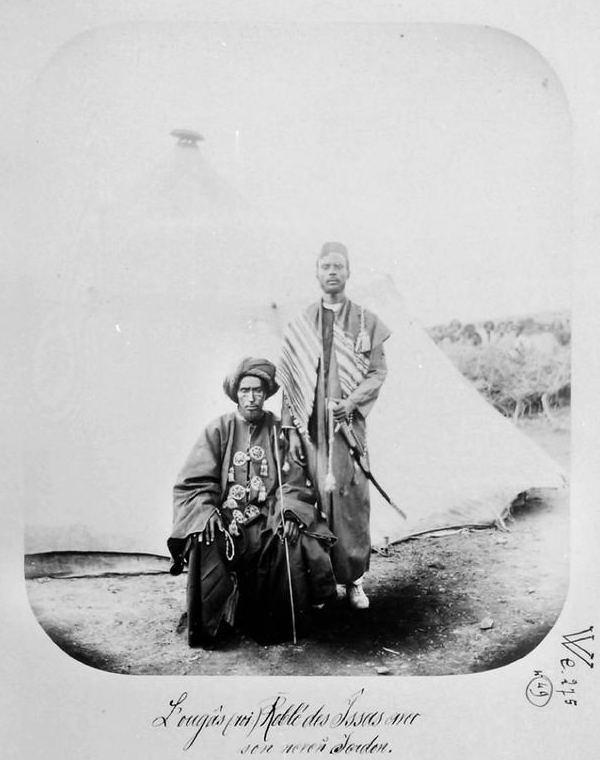
Issa Ugaas Rooble pictured with his nephew Shirdon in 1885

The Issa elders, functioning as a cohesive clan family, faced a series of adversities, including civil strife, famine, banditry, trade disruptions, and societal chaos. In response, they established a traditional constitution called Xeer Ciise, characterized by power-sharing principles, uniting the community in their pursuit of stability and order.

According to oral tradition, as narrated by Issa elders, several centuries ago, the forefathers of the Issa community embarked on a migration journey from Zayla, eventually converging atop Sitti Mountain in what is now Aisha Wereda. This specific location was known as Las Harad. To become an Issa elder and serve as a representative of the twelve Issa sub-clans, one had to meet two fundamental criteria: both parents had to be alive, and they needed to have a son. To facilitate their governance and decision-making processes, a group of forty-four elders convened month-long conferences on Mount Sitti. Each of the twelve Issa sub-clans took turns providing food for the elders during these gatherings. Over time, this assembly of elders devised a comprehensive set of 362 unwritten legal codes known as "hera." Legend has it that a significant event occurred during one of these Mount Sitti conferences when a cloud appeared to hang directly over the representatives of one Issa sub-clan, the Wardik. This extraordinary phenomenon was universally interpreted as a divine sign, signifying the Wardiks as being chosen, even by God, to fulfill leadership roles within the Issa/Somali community. Consequently, from that point forward, the Issa/Somali leader, known as the Ugaas, has been consistently selected from the Wardik sub-clan.

Even though the Ughaz had the highest authority, the Issa clan upholds a notably egalitarian social structure rooted in clan affiliations, where all individuals, regardless of gender, are regarded as equals, and each person possesses the right to express their viewpoint on matters pertaining to their clan. Consequently, consensus-based decision-making is the norm among them. The decision-making process primarily involves consultation, where every male member of the lineage has the entitlement to partake in discussions related to tribal affairs within a collective gathering referred to as 'shir.' Additionally, there exists a court composed of forty-four representatives, representing various sections of the clan, known as the 'Rer Gendi.' This entity serves dual purposes as both a judicial court of appeal and a ritual congregation. It is convened exclusively during periods of national emergencies or crises.

== Lineage ==
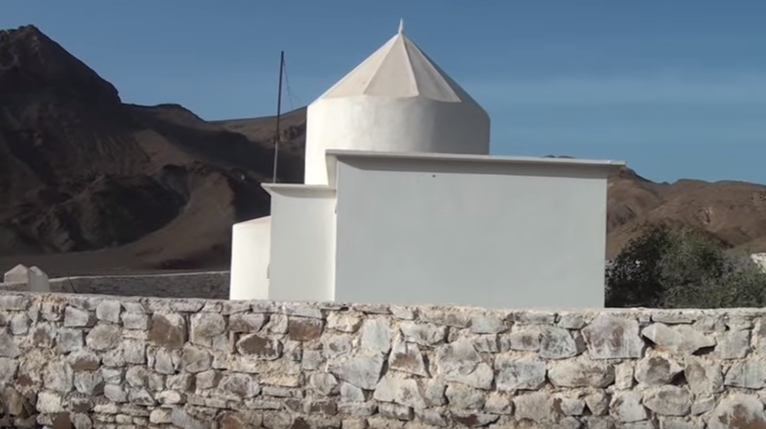
The tomb of Sheikh Issa, the founding father of the Issa clan in Sanaag, Somaliland.

The Issa traditionally traces its connections through Dir, his actual grave lies between Rugay and Maydh in eastern Somaliland. Sheikh Issa's tomb most likely pre-date the local arrival of Islam, which would mean their construction took place in the 13th century or earlier.

=== Genetics ===
The Issa belong to the T-M184 haplogroup and the TMRCA is estimated to be 2100–2200 years or 150 BCE.

=== Clan tree ===
Based on the Notes on the social organisation of the Issa Somal. The Issa is divided into the following branches.

- Issa
  - Ēlēye' (Musse & Mamasan)
  - Walaldon (Idleh & Youssouf)
  - Hōlle (Mahadle & Saaib)
  - Hōrrōne (Habar Walaal & Geele Walaal)
  - Ūrweyne(Cabdelle & Siciid)
  - Wardīq (Wakhtishiil & Rumawaaq)

== Gallery ==
Nomads of the Somali Issa clan	Issa warrior sitting	An Issa man
Jaldessa the seat of the Issa Ugaas	Issas near Harar	Issa nomad sitting in a clearing
Issa herdsman armed with a spear and his dagger in the mountains of Arta	Issa Somali from the Ali Sabieh Region	Issa Somalis filling their buckets at the wells of Daesleh

== Notable Issa people ==
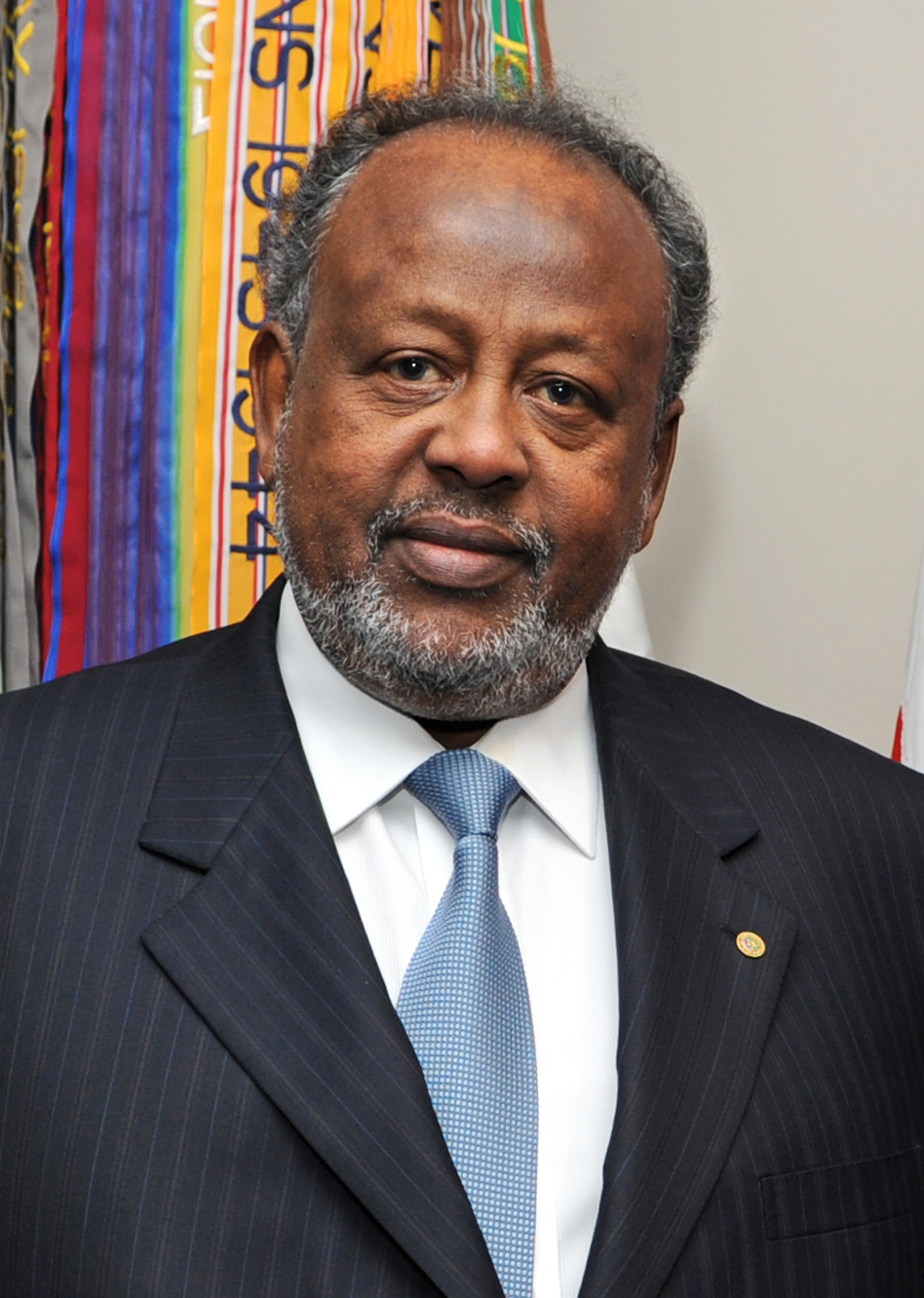
President of Djibouti Ismaïl Omar Guelleh

- Mahmoud Harbi: Vice-president of the Government Council of French Somaliland.
- Hassan Gouled Aptidon: 1916–2006, first President of Djibouti from 1977 to 1999.
- Ismaïl Omar Guelleh: President of Djibouti as of 1999.
- Lula Ali Ismaïl: Djiboutian-Canadian film director
- Abdo Hamargod: Musician
- Daher Ahmed Farah: Djiboutian politician
- Abdourahman Waberi: Novelist
- Ahmed-Idriss Moussa:Djiboutian politician
- Nima Djama: Musician
- Aicha Bogoreh: First lady of Djibouti
- Ahmed Boulaleh Barreh: Djiboutian politician
- Ahmed Salah: Djiboutian athlete
- Idriss Arnaoud Ali: Djiboutian politician
- Xabiiba Cabdilaahi: Musician
- Omar Farah Iltireh: Djiboutian politician
- Aden Robleh Awaleh: President of the National Democratic Party.
- Hawa Ahmed Youssouf: Djiboutian politician
- Mohamed Ali Fourchette: Musician
- Roble Olhaye: Permanent representative to the United Nations for the Republic of Djibouti.
- Kadra Ahmed Hassan: Permanent Representative to the United Nations and the World Trade Organization for the Republic of Djibouti.
- Yacin Bouh: Djiboutian politician.
- Hussein Ahmed Salah: Djiboutian marathon runner.
- Moumin Bahdon: Djiboutian politician.
- Aïcha Mohamed Robleh: Writer
- Jamal Abdi Dirieh: Athlete
- Fadumo Ahmed Dhimbiil: Musician
- Abdi Waiss Mouhyadin: Athlete
- Ahmed Daher: Football
- Aden Farah Samatar: Musician
- Youssouf Hiss Bachir: Athlete
- Mohamed Youssef: Sailor
- Ahmed Goumane-Roble: Politician
- Djama Robleh: Athlete
- Roda Ali Wais: Athlete
- Mohamed Ali Fourchette: Musician
- Mouna-Hodan Ahmed: Novelist
- Hoche Yaya Aden: Athlete
- Moumina Houssein Darar: Djiboutian Anti-Terrorism police investigator.
- Aden Farah: Speaker of House of Federation - Ethiopia
- Choukri Djibah: Politician and Women's equality activist.
- Mohamoud Dirir Gheddi: Ethiopian politician

== See also ==
- Issa (name)
- Dir
- Djibouti
- Zeila
