= Gurgura (woreda) =

Gurgura Some tribal names have been changed for various reasons. that some tribal names were changed in the 15th century is. understand.one of the tribal names that was changed in the 15th century is the name of the seller. The Gurgura tribe was called by the name before that and some of the folklore told by our elders requires adequate research.The name Gurgura came in the 1450s.The name is associated with the name of trade.According to the historian, the first tribes to start trading or Gurgura were the Gurgura tribe.Gurgura means "marchandise Coffee, Arba teeth, Khalloo, livestock, donkeys didi, libaanta, were traded abroad Gurgura tribe as before the 16th century spoke only Oromo language according to the book futuh al-habashati 1529 battle between Imam Ahmed giranyi and the soldiers of lebna dengel at shumbira kurey it is written on the futuh al-habasha club that 4,800 soldiers of the Gura tribe fought alongside Ahmed giranyi.

one that they have actually proved before. The Noolee Dagaa are very famous for their horse fighting.On the other hand, there is something to be raised about the Noolee Oromo known as Balbala Gurgura ""are they Oromo or not". As is known, many people bordering each other in different directions love not only land but also Oromo identity.

== Historic provinces and awrajjas ==
See also: Provinces of Ethiopia and Awrajja

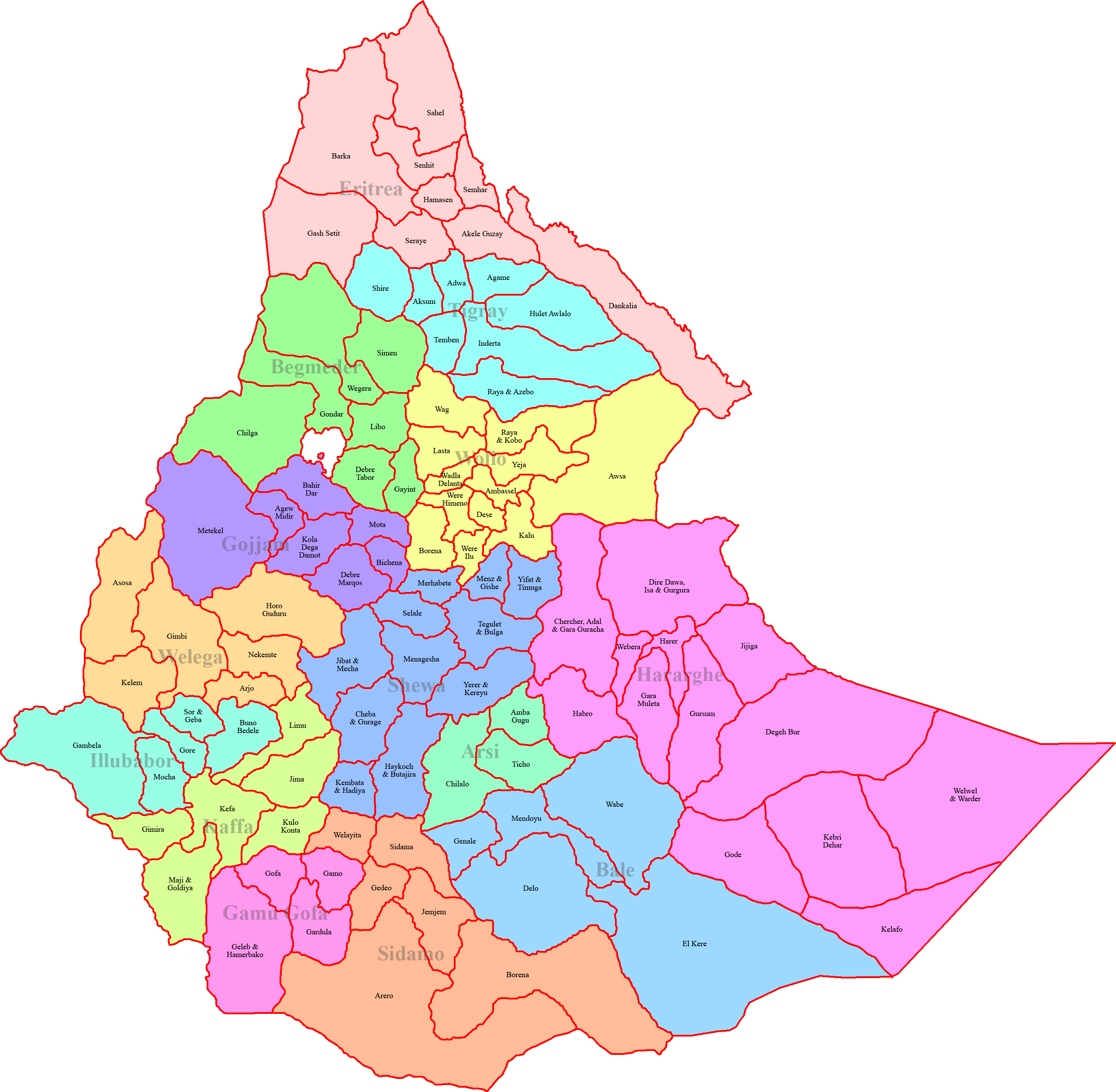
Historic: Former provinces and awrajjas (includes the Eritrea territory)

Prior to the 1995 Constitution, Ethiopia was divided into provinces, and those were further subdivided into awrajjas, then into woredas and then sub-woredas. Previously, Gurgura woreda was part of the Gurgura na Gara Gurgurcha Awwraja, then during the Mengistu regime, Issa na Gurgura Awrajja (which was Dire Dawa + zone shinile ) and during the TPLF rule the zone shinile saw further subdivision subdivisions into Gurgura woreda (Dire Dawa) and sitti zone of the somali region. After the 1995 Constitution, the terms "province" and "awrajja" were dropped in favor of the terms "region" and "zone".

The woreda of Gurgura was in existence as early as Menelik's era but saw military force during the Haile Salesai rule in the 1960s, when its administrative center was at Kersa.

== Demographics ==
Based on figures published by the Central Statistical Agency in 2005, this woreda has an estimated total population of 116,250, of whom 58,004 are men and 58,246 are women; 14,250 or 12.26% of its population are urban dwellers, which is less than the average for entire chartered city of 74.4. With an estimated area of 1,195.52 square kilometers, Gurgura has an estimated population density of 97.2 people per square kilometer, which is less than the average for the administrative region of 328.

The 1994 national census reported a total population for this woreda of 87,013 in 15,827 households, of whom 45,098 were men and 41,915 were women; 8,337 or 9.58% of its population were urban dwellers. The three largest ethnic groups reported in Gurgura were the Oromo (31.48%), the Somali (56.53%), and the Amhara (1.24%); all other ethnic groups made up 0.75% of the population. Oromiffa is spoken as a first language by 82.29%, 15.77% Somali and 1.39% speak Amharic; the remaining 0.55% spoke all other primary languages reported. The majority of the inhabitants were Muslim, with 98.34% of the population reporting that as their faith, while 1.48% practiced Ethiopian Orthodox Christianity. Concerning education, 7.98% of the population were considered literate. Concerning sanitary conditions, 90% of the urban houses and 31% of all houses had access to safe drinking water at the time of the census; 37% of the urban and about 7% of the total had toilet facilities.

Censuses record that Oromo are the greatest percentage of the Gurgura woreda, based on the number who speak the Oromo language. But the Gurgura clan share both Somali and Oromo identities, speaking the Oromo language and tracing their genealogy to the Dir, a Somali clan family. Gurgura are mentioned in the Futuh al-Habasha : Conquest of Abyssinia as source dating back as far as the 16th century as Somalis who fought alongside imam Ahmed. So most inhabitants are of the Gurgura clan.
