= Gurgura =

Northern Somali clan

Gurgure
غُرْغُرَا

Regions with significant populations
- Ethiopia, Somaliland, Djibouti & Somalia

Languages
- Somali, and Arabic

Religion
- Islam (Sunni)

Related ethnic groups
- Issa, Gadabuursi, Akisho, Jaarso, Surre, Isaaq, Biimaal, Gurre and other Dir clans.

The Gurgure, Gorgorah or Gurgura (Somali: Gurgure, Arabic: غُرْغُرَا Gorgorah) is a northern Somali clan, a sub-division of the Dir clan family.

== Overview ==
As a Dir sub-clan, the Gurgura have immediate lineal ties with the Akisho, Gadabuursi, Issa, the Surre (Abdalle and Qubeys), the Jaarso, the Biimaal (who the Gaadsen also belong to), the Bajimal, the Bursuk, the Madigan Dir, the Garre (the Quranyow sub-clan to be precise as they claim descent from Dir), Gurre, Gariire, other Dir sub-clans and they have lineal ties with the Hawiye (Irir), Hawadle, Ajuran, Degoodi, Gaalje'el clan groups, who share the same ancestor Samaale.

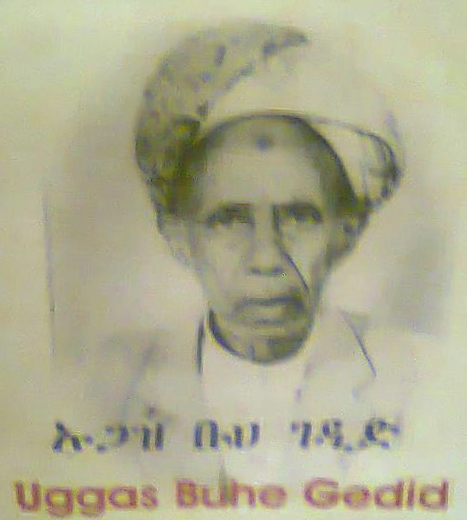
Ugaas Buux Gadiid. The historical Ughaz (sultan) of the Gurgura clan of Somalis. One of the most notable figures of Dire Dawa and 52nd Uggas of Gurgure.

== Distribution ==
The Gurgure (Mohamed) Madaxweyne Dir is a vast clan that stretch from Sanaag (Somaliland) to the Awash Valley. They also extend to the south into Bale region where they Gurgure settlements near the town Sheikh Hussein can be found. They are associated with trade and the spread of Islam.

The Gurgure are the majority in Dire Dawa, Afdem (woreda) and Erer district in the Sitti Zone. Gurgure are the founders of the city of Dire Dawa, Sheikh, Somaliland, Erer among other cities in Somaliland and Ethiopia. Today the Gurgure live in Dire Dawa, Somali Region of Ethiopia, Harar region, Djibouti, Somaliland, and the Afar Region. Lo'jir Gurgure (Nabidoor & Biciide-Harun Muse) live as far east asErigavo and Heis (town) in Sanaag.

In Dire Dawa Gurgure live in 24 kebeles out of the 38 and share 6 other kebeles with oromo and 2 with issa.

== Origin ==
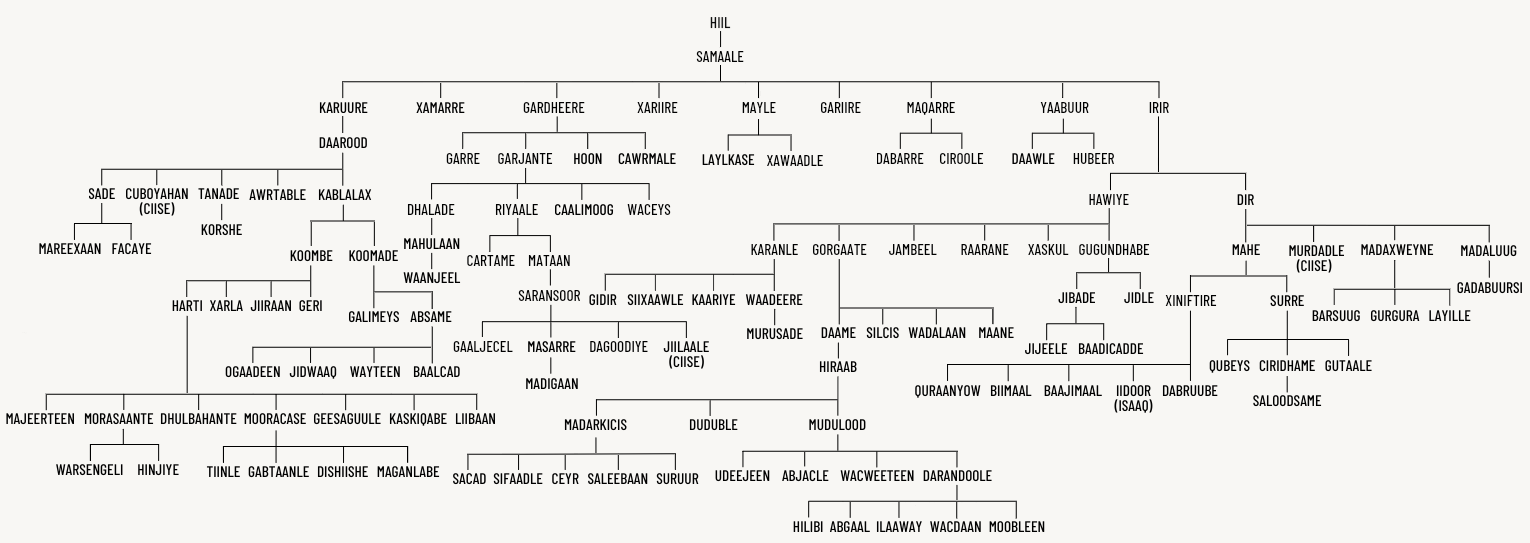
Genealogical tree of Somali clans

The Gurgura are a Somali clan who inhabit the Sitti Zone, Dire Dawa, Harar, Somaliland and the first clan who founder in dire Dawa. The Gurgura are the eldest Dir and most ancient Somali clan who migrated from Awdal east into Sanaag and southwest into Harar, Dire Dawa and Awash Valley as traders that connected the Arabs, Europeans, Indians and Chinese in Zeila to Harar. The Gurgura brought dyed garments, salt, sugar etc.. from Zeila to Harar and went back to Zeila with leather, species, frankincense and livestock. Along the trade routes, the Gurgura established settlements that were thriving communities during the Sultanate of Ifat and Adal Sultanate. Examples of these settlements named after Gurgura saints include Jaldessa, Abasa, Awdal, Amud, Awbare, Awbube and Dire Dawa.

The name Gurgure in Somali is derived from the old Somali word Gorgortan (meaning to bargain or negotiate as a merchant) according some sources as the Gurgura were known as traders. According other sources the name was derived from Guur guur (meaning to move from one place to another frequently) Guur guur can also mean aqal Somali or Somali huts. Gurgur can also mean to crawl like babies do. It is only more recently in the 19th century that the name Gurgura started being associated with Oromos (that means that act of selling or to sell).

Mohamed "Gurgura" Madaxweyne Dir (clan) is the eldest Dir clan and one of the earliest Somalis if not the earliest in the Horn of Africa. The is evident as there are many other Dir tribes with Bah Gurgura sub tribes such as the Gadabuursi, Issa and Isaaq. Majority of the Gadabuursi subclans had Gurgura mothers. The Bah Gurgura and Bah Sanayo subclans of the Gadabuursi Dir clan are matrinileal descendants of both the celebrated patron saints Awbare and Awbube. Bah Gurgura Mamasan Eleye Issa (clan) as well as Habar Yoonis and Habr Je'lo. Gurgura predates most of these younger northern Somali clans. The ruined towns excavated on the Ethiopian Somali boarder by A.T. Curle reveal the sophistication of ancient towns associated with Gurgura saints. The Gadabuursi town of Awbare is one of the largest and is named after Sheikh Awbare, a famous sheikh of Ifat and Adal Sultanates, who of the Nabioor subclan of the Gurgura. Another Gadabuursi ancient settlement known as Awbube is also named after a Gurgura saint called Sheikh Awbube who was a famous Ifat era saint also Nabidoor Gurgure. The Gadabuursi subclans of Reer Nuur and Adan Yoonis are collectively known as Bah Gurgura as their ancestor was Halimo Sheikh who was the sister of Bare Sheikh more famously known as Sheikh Awbare, the Saint the ancient town is named after.

The Origin & History of the Somali People by Ibrahim Ali argues the warriors who fought Amda Seyon (1314 - 1344) also included the Gurgura warriors. The description of these warriors tying themselves together and then going into battle is identical to the battle practiced by the Gurgura - "first the [Nabidoor] Gurgura were sent in to battle, and when we draw the first blood, it means we are guaranteed victory." [ Origin & History of Somali People, by I. Ali]. The Gurgura and other Dir tribes like the Surre Qubeys are known and associated with introducing Islam to the many parts of Somalia and Ethiopia.

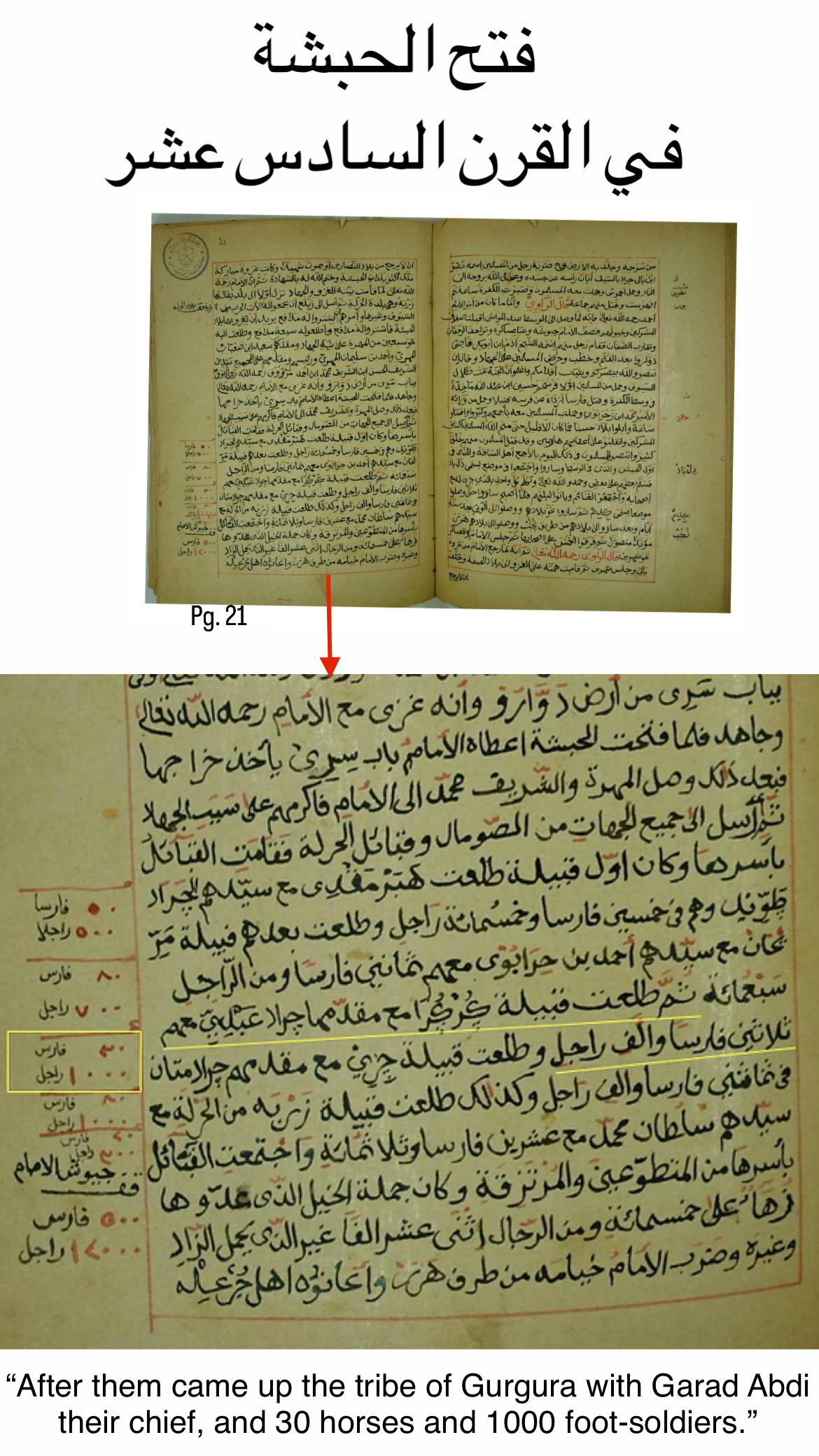
Mentions of Gurgura in the Conquest of Abyssinia: Futuh Al Habasha

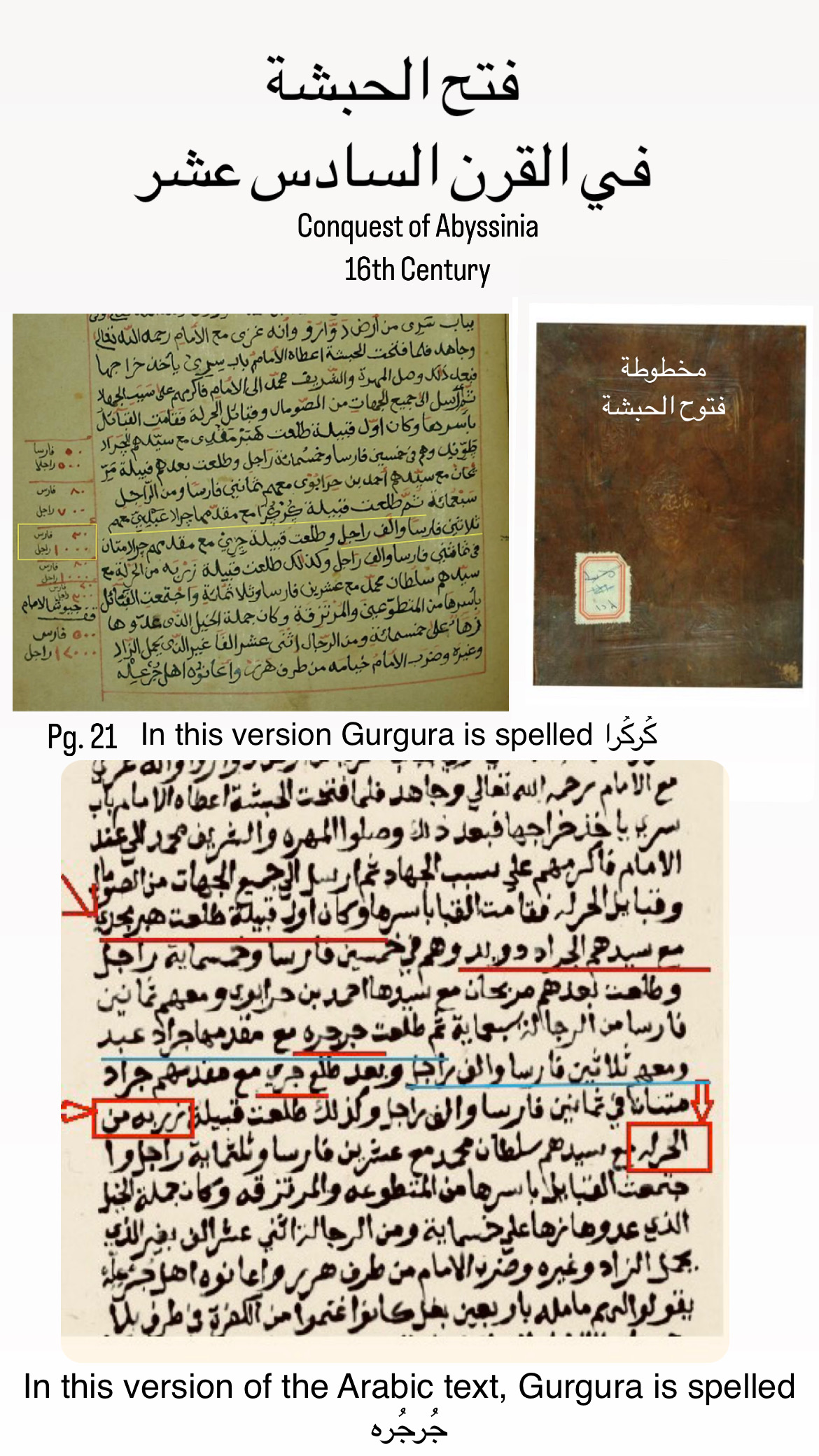
Different version of Gurgura spelling

== History ==
The Gurgura are mentioned several times in the Futuh al-Habasha: Conquest of Abyssinia as source dating back as far as the 16th century, by Shihabudin Ahmad bin Abd al-Qadir. It is recorded that the Gurgura were among the famous Somali spearmen led by their chief Garad Abdi who fought alongside Ahmed Gurey or Ahmad ibn Ibrahim al-Ghazi.

..."composed of the somali spearmen of the Marraihan, the Gorgorah and the Hawiya; are one thousand of them among the most famous spearmen. And from the soldiers bearing shields the same number." p. 120-121 "After them came up the tribe of Gorgorah (Gurgura) with Garad Abdi their chieftan, and 30 horses and 1,000 men." p. 123

Patrick Gilkes (2003) mentions the Gurgura as one of the clans that participated in the Futuh Al Habasha : Conquest of Abyssinia:

Emir Ahmed Gurrey, known to the Ethiopians as Ahmed Gran. The emir himself was almost certainly from one of the pre-Somali peoples around Harar, but Somalis from a number of clans, particularly the Gorgora, a clan that probably originated around Zelia, certainly fought in his armies. Ahmed himself probably had no direct links with Somalis other than recruiting them, but his mythic value was substantial. He had launched a highly successful jihad against Ethiopia in the 1530s.

The city of Dire Dawa was originally called Dir and used to be part of the Sultanate of Ifat and Adal Sultanate during the medieval times and was exclusively settled by Dir clan (Gurgure, Issa and Gadabuursi). After the weakening of Adal Sultanate, the Ethiopian Christians and later on Oromos took advantage and were able to penetrate through the city and settle the surrounding areas.

Dir a settlement which according to Huntingford, may conceivably be modern day Dire Dawa. Huntingford, Historical Geography of Ethiopia, p. 122. (p)

In his book Across Widest Africa: An Account of the Country and People of Eastern, Central and Western Africa As Seen During a Twelve Months' Journey from Djibuti to Cape Verde, Volume 2, written in 1905, Arnold Henry Savage Landor describes the Gurgura as a Somali tribe that he encountered on his way to Harar from Djibouti in and around Dire Dawa and back towards Abyssinia. The authors refers to the land between Dire Dawa and Harar as Gurgura. The author says he met

"the Gurgura in great numbers with their spears, looking after sheep and camels. The Gurgura possessing a skin of a deep chocolate colour, and divided them into two distinct types: one with wholly hair, or twisted into curls; the other not so common, with smooth hair, which is always left long and reaches the shoulders. Some grew a slight beard upon the cheeks and chin. The author goes on to say that they all had eyes the iris of which was of a deep brown, but that portion of the eye-ball which is white was dark yellowish tone."

Landor writes about making a camp near hot springs on his way to Abyssinia today known as Erer hot springs in the Sitti Zone of Somali Region. There he met the Hawiya, like the Gurgura, who speak Somali, and some also understand the Galla (Oromo) language. The author describes the Hawiya, the Ghedebursi (Gadabuursi), Issa, Gurgura, Haberual (Habar Awal) and Dahrot (Darod) as speaking Somali.

== Gurgura Political Organization ==
The Gurgura fought for the Somali rebels during the Ethiopian Civil War and supported the annexation of Dire Dawa, Ejersa Goro, Hurso and Erer, they actively participated in the Issa and Gurgura Liberation Front and clashed with the Oromo Liberation Front on numerous occasions for control over Dire Dawa.

- Issa Gurgure Libration Front (IGLF) was active until 1991 it was led by an Abdiaziz Gurgure and later by Mr.Riyaale Ahmed
- Independent Gurgure Libration Front (GLF) was founded by Member of Parliament Abdiaziz Gurgure currently chief Advisor to NISS and senior advisor to Ministry of Foreign Affairs of Ethiopia
- Horiyaal Democratic Party was a Gadaburis led political Party in Ethiopia with their Dir Issa and Gurgure, however; several attempts to unite the three with other Somali tribes didn't fall through.

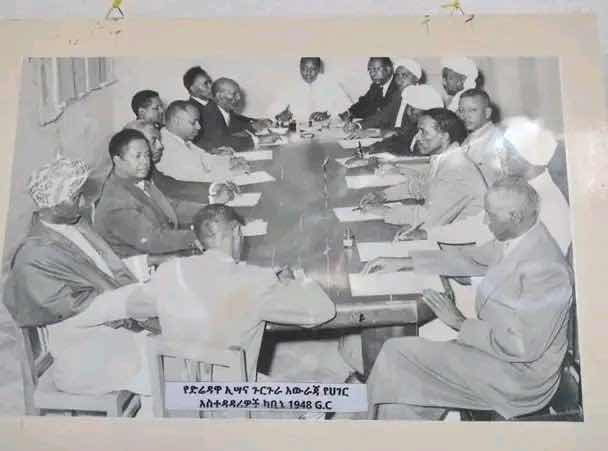
Issa & Gurgura Awraja - Ugaas Hassan Hersi (L) and Ugaas Buux Gadiid (R) - Dire Dawa 1948

The Gurgura established Gurgura Liberation Movement match earlier than Gurgura Liberation Front which later joined arms with the Issa to form IGLF (Issa Gurgura Liberation Front). IGLF was established by 24 people, 12 people from Issa and 12 people also from Gurgura. Riyale Ahmed of the Issa became president of IGLF, while Gurgura became the vice president. The IGLF members were from the il Tire branch of the Western Somali Liberation Front. After the many fights over control Dire Dawa with the Issa against Oromo, the Ethiopian military took control of the area. These two liberation fronts with Horiyaal were the founding members to of the ESPDP (Ethiopian Somali People Democratic Party) in Hurso which Ahmed Shide Represents today in Abyi Ahmed's PP government.

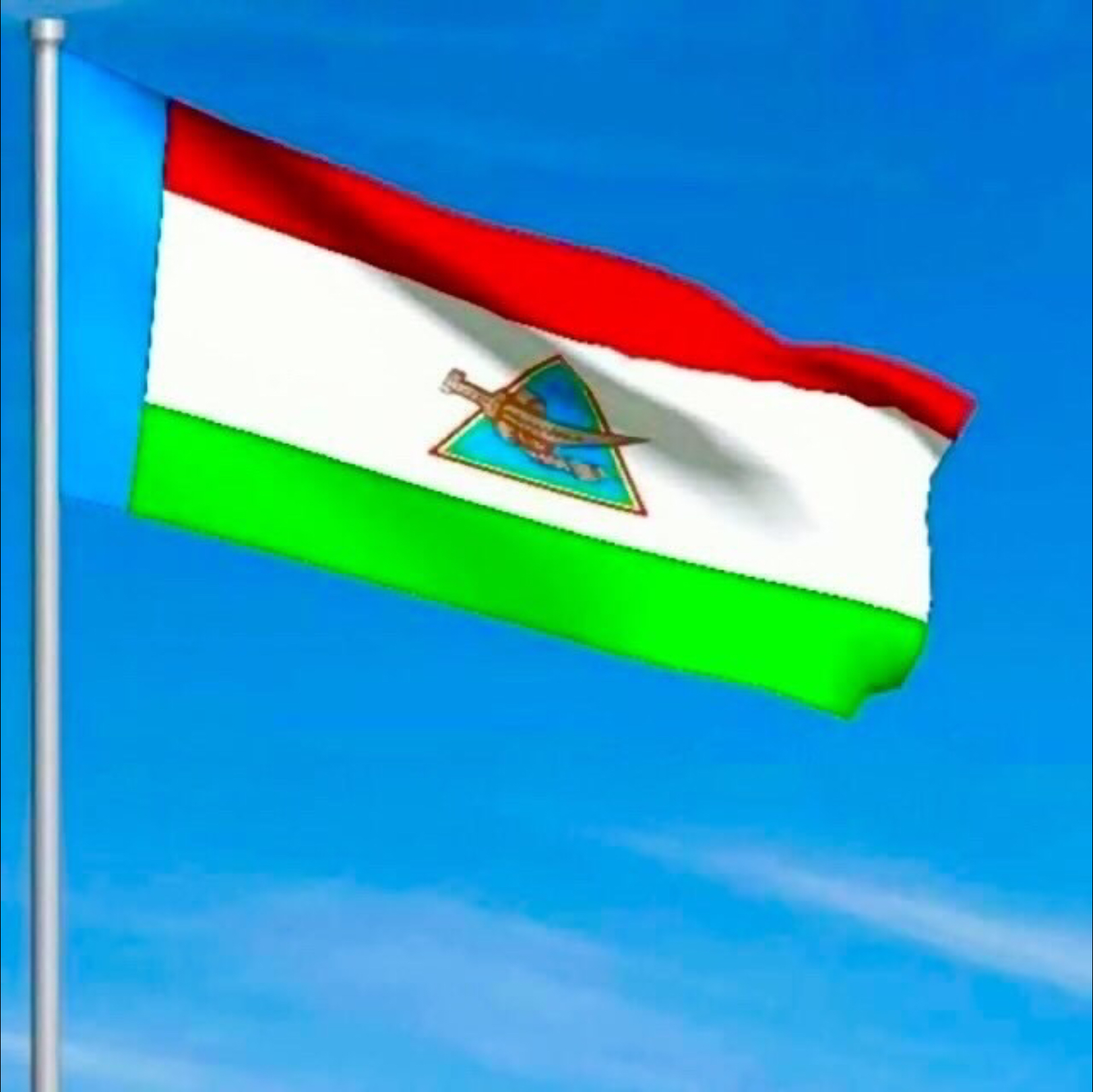
Gurgura Libration Front Flag

After the Issa sabotaged the Gurgura, the GLF separated from IGLF. GLF leaders informed the transitional government of EPRDF about the separation of Gurgura Liberation Front. The transitional government of EPRDF allowed us to open our office in Addis Ababa and Dire Dawa.

Then GLF officially launched their work with Abdiwahab sheikh Abdiwali as the head of GLF and military camp. Abdulaziz Ahmed as the Gurgura representative in the parliament. With Mohamed Yusuf Omar as the vice representative of Gurgura in the parliament. Abdulaziz was also elected as vice chairperson of the Ethiopian Electoral Board Commission during the transitional period of EPRDF government.

Over 500 hectares of Hurso farm lands were seized by the Mengistu Haile Mariam's Derg government, which ruled Ethiopia from 1974 to 1991 in the aftermath of the 1977-78 Ogaden War. The Gurgura also lost over 7000 homes in the city of Dire Dawa which were never returned to the families that were displaced this day. The farms and homes were seized by the government as a punishment for their involvement in the 1977 war.

=== Historical Background of Gurgura and Oromo Relationship ===
Nole, Jarso and Ala Oromo sub-clans used to fight among each other for grazing and territorial expansions. The Ala who out numbered the Nole pushed and forced them eastward into Jarso territory near Harar while the Jarso forced the Nole westward towards Ala. Due to many victorious battle over Nole, the Ala succeeded in controlling extensive territories which included the present day Gurgura territory near Dire Dawa. The then leader of Nole, called for the support of Gurgura after his defeat by Ala and Jarso.

After securing the support of the Gurgura, the combined forces fought against the Ala forcing them to retreated to Gara muleta area south of Harar. As reward for this military alliance the leader of Nole gave many brides and extensive territories to the Gurgura.

Post the wars, the alliance strengthened between the Nole and Gurgura (Specifically Kundhible sub-clan) over the years politically. Due this alliance and brides the Gurgura men took from the Nole for their military assistance, the Gurgura who are living in the eastern part of Dire Dawa Region and eastern Hararghe Zone of the Oromia region gradually started speaking Afaan Oromo as their mother tongue.

Shiekh Adam Ahmed Ibrahim "Tula" was asked by Dr. Jeylani Kadir Gamada in his biography if Shiekh Adam knew when the Nole-Gurgura alliance started, to which he replied "I have been told it started before the time of the Prophet; though it is an exaggration. I have been told it started before my time." - Shiekh Adam Tula

Oromo political organizations sought to coerce the Oromo speaking Gurgura in the rural villages of Dire Dawa and Oromia Region, to get them to identify themselves as Oromo for their political and land grabbing ambitions. The 1995 Ethiopian national "census" is nothing but a propaganda tool to undermine the presences of Somalis not just Dire Dawa but all along the border between Somali and Oromo Regions. The Oromo speaking Somalis were identify as Oromos solely based on the language they spoke though they belong to and identified as Gurgura who are genealogically true Somalis. Oromo elders and politicians claimed that "the Gurgura people who speak the Oromo language belong to the Oromo tribes and they only started to identify themselves with the Somali after the 1974 change of the Haile Selassie regime" though Gurgura and Somalis strongly disagree.

== Clan Tree ==
The Gurgura (abtirsi or clan tree) are subdivided into seven major sub-clans. Eldest son of Gurgure is Kundhuble, Gufaatile, Sanjecele, Sanaye, Nabidoor, Gacalwaaq and Biciide. The Gurgure Ugaas is selected and chosen from reer Gufatile as it is the tradition if he fulfills all the requirements.

- Dir
  - Madaxweyne
    - Gurgure (Mohamed)
      1. Habr Daar
        - Kundhible
          - Abdulle
          - Ali
      2. Dudub
        1. Libaan
          - Gufaatile
            - Ismail
            - Sabti
            - Awbare
          - Sanjeele
          - Sanaye
            - Walasame
            - Walahashiir
        2. Quwaxade
          - Nabidoor
            - Aw Bare
          - Biciide
            - Foodnabi
              - Ahmed
            - Ahmed Meel Gooble
          - Gacalwaaq
            - Cassa
              - Gumaroon
            - Jibril
              - Aden
              - Omar
              - Fiqii
              - Macalin
              - Eebo

== Notable Gurgure Figures ==
- Abwaan Cabdi Muxumed Amiin
- Maxamed Saalax Xaaji Cali (Yacnile)
- Shiekh Abdiwali Aw-Muxumed
- Shiekh Abu Bakr Garad Osman (Sabalo)
- Shiekh Mohammed Rashad Abdulle (Translated the Quran into Afan Oromo)
- Shantam Shubbisa (a talented artist known for his contributions to Oromo music)
- Shiekh Ahmedbashir Aw-Muxumed Afgudaye
- Ugaas Buux Gaiid (52nd Ugaas of Gurgure and Dir Dhabah's most notable figure)
- Ugaas Gadiid Abdullahi Ugaas Buux (53rd Ugaas of Gurgure)
- Ismail Aw Aden - First mayor of Dire Dawa (after TPLF control of Dire Dawa)
- Sh. Abdiaziz Sh. Abdiwali (Vice President of Ethiopian Islamic Affairs Supreme Council)
- Ugaas Siyad Daud Cumar (54th and current Ugaas)
- Abdiwahab Sh. Abdiwali (former Colonel Somali National Army, Politician, prominent Gurgure leader of Dire Dawa & Somali Region)
- Sh. Adam Ahmed Ibrahim (Tula)
- Colonel Ahmed Kacaan
- Dr. Ahmed Y. Ali (Researcher at Cardiff University)
- Macalin Qaasim Xaaji-Maxamed (well known sheikh of Somaliland who taught the likes of former presidents of Somaliland such as Egal, Silaanyo, Cirro and Edna Aden)
- Shiekh Abdurahman Damota
- Biftu Mohamed Ibrahim (Federal MP for Dire Dawa)
- Mohamed Yusuf Omar (retired Federal MP)
- Ibrahim Yusuf (Head of Dire Dawa PP/Government)
- Abdiaziz Ahmed Gurgure (MP, former Ethiopian Ambassador to Ivory Coast, Saudi Arabia, Kuwait and among other countries, Currently Senior Adv. MoFA & Chief Adv. to NISS)

== See also ==
- Hurso
- Gurgura Woreda
- Erer
