= Abdallah Lee =

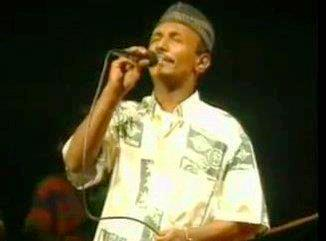

Background information
- Born: Abdallah Abdoulkader Abass; 7 August 1963; Djibouti, French Somaliland
- Origin: Djibouti
- Died: 18 September 2007 (aged 44) Poitiers, France
- Genre: Djiboutian music
- Occupation: Singer
- Years active: 1979–2007

Abdallah Abdoulkader Abass (commonly known as Abdallah Lee; 1963–2007) was a well-known Djiboutian songwriter, composer and singer. He remains among the most famous Afar singers in Djibouti. Abdallah had a significant influence on newer generations of Djiboutian musicians in the 1980s and 1990s.

== Biography ==
Abdallah was born on 7 August 1963 in Djibouti City, Quartier 3 at the maternity ward of the former Paul-Faure hospital. He is the son of Abdoulkader Abass Bourhan Aboubaker and great-grandson of Aboubaker Ibrahim, governor of Zeila in modern-day Somalia under Ottoman sovereignty at the end of the 19th century, and Kadidja Said Abdallah Baabad.

He lived with his family, first in Quartier 3, then in Quartier 1, and finally in the city of Arhiba. He passed his undergraduate examinations and was planning on pursuing a technical master's degree, but then abandoned his studies and took a job as a storekeeper in Obock, where his mother's family lived. It was then that he began playing music with Osman Adoyta, Moussa Aden, Bourhan Daoud, Ahmed Abdallah, Ahmed Ibrahim, Mohamed Aden.

Between 1980 and 1990, like the group Dinkâra, he practiced an "Afro-rock with nomadic colors", and also became involved in the civil war. While singing mainly in Afar, he also interprets Somali songs. Abdallah Lee has toured in France, Ethiopia, Belgium and Sweden. He participated in various Djiboutian groups during his career and at the Fest'Horn festival.

After becoming very sick, Abdallah Lee was transported to France to a hospital in Poitiers, where he died on 18 September 2007, at 44 years old. He had a wife and seven children. He was buried in Djibouti.

"Sini Bili Ya Mayy" sung by Abdallah Lee feat Dinkara

== Music ==
Popular songs by Abdallah Lee include:

- Sini Bili Ya Mayy
- Naaxigeh
- Num Abtol Yaaxigen
- Woysa mannika
- Qax kot yaadeeh, kacni yot yaade
- Bakaarat edde anyo
- Aba yaabah ayti cuya
- Rada roobuk
- Mermeeritta
- Arhotabba
- Jabuuti
- baxuwwayto
- Ni baaxo
- Deber mogolla
- Xukko xinto neh matakka

== See also ==
- Music of Djibouti
