= Mohamed Ali Fourchette =

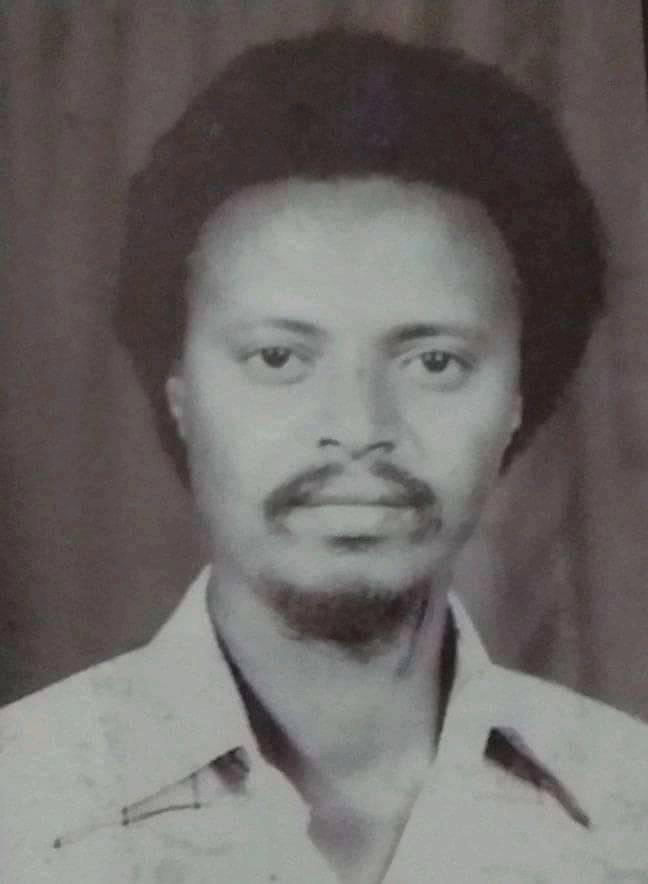

Background information
- Born: Mohamed Ali Fourchette; 1950; Djibouti, French Somaliland
- Origin: Djibouti
- Died: 1992 (aged 41–42) Djibouti City, Djibouti
- Genres: Djiboutian music
- Occupation: Musician
- Instruments: Oud, Electric guitar, Vocals
- Years active: 1960s–1992

Mohamed Ali Fourchette (1950–1992) was a prominent Djiboutian vocalist and instrumentalist.

== History ==
Mohamed Ali Fourchette was born in 1946 in Djibouti, French Somaliland. He hails from Issa, Somali parents. Mohamed's involvement with music began at a very early age, with him first taking up singing during childhood. He later started to play the guitar. He went on stage for the first time in 1965 at the age of 15 with Abdi Bow Bow and Abdo Xamar Qoodh. He was shortly afterwards inducted to the Gacan Macan. In the 1970s, Fourchette sang famous patriotic song called Gobanimo meaning independence against the French colonization.

He died on 3 January 1993 in Peltier Hospital in Djibouti City, Djibouti.

=== Singles ===
- Gobanimo
- Dhamee Allaahayoow
- Ma Dhamaystirno
- Walaalayaal
- Maw liihii Na Oumaa
- Guusha
- Mowzi ragaay
- Ilahi ii Dhaliye
- Sheikh Cusman
- Idhigo Abaal
- Abo

== See also ==
- Music of Djibouti
