= Abdoulkader Waberi Askar =

Djiboutian politician (1931–1993)

President of the National Assembly
- In office May 1979 – 10 February 1993
- Preceded by: Saad Warsama Dirie
- Succeeded by: Said Ibrahim Badoul

Personal details
- Born: 1931
- Died: 10 February 1993 (aged 62); Paris, France
- Political party: RPP
- Profession: Politician · journalist

Abdoulkader Waberi Askar (Note: Also spelled Abdelkader Waberi Askar in some sources.) (1931 – 10 February 1993) was a Djiboutian politician who served as president of the National Assembly from 1979 until his death in 1993. He was a member of the People's Rally for Progress (RPP) party and had previously been a journalist.

== Biography ==
Askar was born in 1931. He was from the Somali clan of Issa. He was by profession a journalist, and he worked as a presenter for Radio-France Outre-mer in Djibouti from 1956 to 1961.

Askar was active in politics, being a strong advocate of Djiboutian independence from France, of which Djibouti was then an overseas territory. As of 1976, he was serving as the Minister of the Civil Service. He also held ministerial positions as Minister of Finance and Minister of the Economy. While Djibouti was still a territory, Askar served in its Chamber of Deputies. He was a member of the People's Rally for Progress (RPP) party.

Two years after Djiboutian independence, Askar, a member of the new National Assembly, was elected president of the legislature to succeed Saad Warsama Dirie, in May 1979. He was regularly re-elected the president of the legislature and his service in the position ended up spanning 14 years.

Askar fell ill and was transported to a hospital in Paris on 22 December 1992. He died there on 10 February 1993, at the age of 62. After his death, the government announced a three-day mourning period, during which all political demonstrations and sporting and cultural events were prohibited. He was succeeded as president of the National Assembly by Said Ibrahim Badoul.
