= Bursuuk =

Clan belonging to Madahweyne sub clan of the Dir clan family

Bursuuk

Regions with significant populations
- Ethiopia

Languages
- Somali

Religion
- Islam (Sunni)

Related ethnic groups
- Gadabuursi, Issa, Gurgura, Akisho, Bimaal, Surre and other Dir groups

The Bursuuk (Somali: Barsuug) or also written as Barsuk, Barsuq and Barsoub is a clan belonging to Madahweyne sub-clan of the Dir clan family and are not related to the Musa Ali section of the Arap who adopted their name. They largely live in Ethiopia, in the Somali Region, especially around the ancient city of Harar and between the city and Jigjiga.

== History ==
The Bursuuk were one of the Somali clans that fought on the left flank of Imam Ahmad ibn Ibrahim al-Ghazi's army during the Ethiopian-Adal War. According to Antoine d'Abbadie, he notes that the Barentu Oromo had occupied Dakkar from the Bursuuk which they have integrated in their mythology.

The Bursuuk are considered one of the native Dir tribes of Harar. During the Egyptian occupation of Harar, the Bursuuk resisted the Egyptian colonizers and fought many battles against them. During the Egyptian retreat from Harar, they burned many Barsuuk villages. In retaliation, the Bursuuk attacked the retreating Egyptian troops, and looted caravans of the Habr Awal clan. Richard Burton described the Bursuuk as one of "the Somalis of the mountains" who derive themselves from the Dir.

During 1854 that they were at war with three different clans or tribes: the Girhi, the Berteri and the Gallas (who are known today as Oromos).
