= Saad Warsama Dirie =

Djiboutian politician

President of Djibouti National Assembly
- In office 13 July 1971 – May 1979
- Preceded by: Abdoulkader Waberi Askar
- Succeeded by: Ahmed Dini Ahmed

Saad Warsama Dirie was a Djiboutian politician who served as President of the National Assembly, the unicameral legislative branch of the government of Djibouti, from 13 July 1977 until May 1979, succeeding Ahmed Dini Ahmed and preceding Abdoulkader Waberi Askar. He played a key role during the early years of Djibouti's independence, contributing to the establishment of its legislative framework. Beyond politics, he was also associated with public service roles, including work in Djibouti's public works and port sectors.
