= Music of Djibouti =

The Djiboutian Music (Somali: Muusiga Jabuutiyaan, Afar: Gabuutih Gadda) refers to the musical styles, techniques and sounds of Djibouti. The first major form of modern Djiboutian music began in the mid-1940s, when Djibouti was a part of the French Somaliland. Djiboutian music is characterized by poetry, so that listening to a Djiboutian song is first paying attention to its meaning. The artist rocks the listeners in the cheerfulness of the refrains and the turn of the sentences. Often sung by a couple, a song is played in the form of a sleight of hand between a man and a woman, one recounting his feelings and his love, even his passion for the other, until the other accepts or rejects this offer.

The Djiboutian song is also distinguished by the "Gouux", a deep and sensual voice which highlights the artist's passion for his work.

== Overview ==
Djibouti is a multiethnic country. The two largest ethnic groups are the Somali and the Afar. There are also a number of Arab, Ethiopian and European (French and Italian) residents. Traditional Afar music resembles the folk music of other parts of the Horn of Africa such as Ethiopia; it also contains elements of Arabic music. The history of Djibouti is recorded in the poetry and songs of its nomadic people and goes back thousands of years to a time when the peoples of Djibouti traded hides and skins for the perfumes and spices of ancient Egypt, India and China. Afar oral literature is also quite musical. It comes in many varieties, including songs for weddings, war, praise and boasting. Somalis have a rich musical heritage centered on traditional Somali folklore. Most Somali songs are pentatonic; that is, they only use five pitches per octave in contrast to a heptatonic (seven note) scale such as the major scale. At first listen, Somali music might be mistaken for the sounds of nearby regions such as Ethiopia, Sudan or the Arabian Peninsula, but it is ultimately recognizable by its own unique tunes and styles. Modern Djiboutian popular music can be traced back to the late 1940s, Somali songs are usually the product of collaboration between lyricists (midho), songwriters (laxan), and singers (codka or "voice"). Balwo is a Somali musical style centered on love themes that is popular in Djibouti.

"Dhooley" sung by Abdo Xamar Qoodh

"Maadoora" sung by Abayazid Badri ft Dinkara Band

The national anthem of Djibouti is "Djibouti", adopted in 1977 with words by Aden Elmi and music by Abdi Robleh. "Miniature poetry", invented by a truck driver named Abdi Deeqsi, is well known in Djibouti; these are short poems (balwo), mostly concerning love and passion. They perform music and dance from two of Djibouti's main ethnic groups (Somali, Afar), they feature regularly on Djiboutian radio and television shows and perform as representatives of Djiboutian culture around the world. This festival draws performers from all over the country, and live recordings of headliner acts have proved popular with international audiences. Among the best-known performers are the Dinkara and Aïdarous. The government sponsors several organizations dedicated to the preservation of traditional culture and dance.

Djiboutian traditional instruments include the tanbura, bowl lyre and oud. It is often accompanied by small drums and a reed flute in the background.

== Music institutions ==
The first radio station in Djibouti to air popular Djiboutian music was (ORTF) Radio based in Djibouti. It started broadcasting in 1940 in French, Somali, Afar and Arabic. Djiboutian music is now regularly broadcast on the state-run Radio Television of Djibouti, whose in-house band is Groupe RTD.

== List of Djiboutian musicians ==
- Nima Djama
- Abdo Xamar Qoodh
- Mohamed Ali Fourchette
- Abdallah Lee
- Aden Farah Samatar
- Fadumo Ahmed Dhimbiil
- Xabiiba Cabdilaahi
