= Akisho =

Dir
Akisho أكيشو

Regions with significant populations
- Ethiopia, Somaliland & Djibouti

Languages
- Somali

Religion
- Islam (Sunni)

Related ethnic groups
- Gurgura, Jaarso, Bursuuk, Issa, Gadabuursi, Bimaal, Surre and other Dir groups

The Akisho (Somali: Akiisho, Arabic: أكيشو) is a northern Somali clan, a sub-division of the Dir clan family.

== Overview ==
As a Dir sub-clan, the Akisho have immediate lineal ties with the Issa, the Gadabuursi, the Jaarso, the Surre (Abdalle and Qubeys), the Biimaal (who the Gaadsen also belong too), the Bajimal, the Bursuk, the Gurgura, the Gurre, the Layiile sub-clan to be precise as they claim descent from Dir), Gariire, other Dir sub-clans and they have lineal ties with the Hawiye (Irir), Hawadle, Ajuraan, Degoodi, Gaalje'el clan groups, who share the same ancestor Samaale.

== Distribution ==
The Akisho inhabit Somaliland, Djibouti and Ethiopia, particularly in both the Somali Region and Oromo Region. In Somaliland, Akisho members live in the Maroodi Jeex region, in the cities and towns of Arabsiyo, Wajaale, Allaybaday, and Gabiley, In Djibouti Akisho members live in the Ali Sabieh region. In Ethiopia, where the Akisho are among the most widespread Somali group, Akisho members inhabit Jijiga, Qordhere, Dire Dewa, Bale (Nagelle), Babile, Fayanbiro, Qabri-Bayah, Fiq, Hara-Maaya, Harar, Obra, and Dadar. Fadeyga godanta booraale gursum and many more geographical regions. Currently, the sultan of the Akisho clan is Muhiyadiin Odawa.

The Akisho inhabit Ethiopia, particularly in both the Somali Region and Oromo Region

Also the Madahweyne Dir, Akisho clan is one of the largest Dir sub-clans within the borders of the Somaliland region of Ethiopia based on the Ethiopian population census. Many Akisho's live in the Afar region of Ethiopia.

The Akisho live in Jijiga district where they make up a large part of the Kebri Beyah and Fafan Zone. The Dir-Madaxweyne Akisho, along with the Gurgura, Issa and Gadabuursi subclans of the Dir represent the most native and indigenous Somali tribes in Harar.

== History ==
The Akisho is one of the oldest Somali clans being mentioned as far back as the 16th century in the book The Conquest of Abyssinia also known as Futuh al-Habash. Akisho members are strict adherents of Sunni Islam. Akisho groups and their related clans are reputed to have migrated from Somali Ethiopian region all the way up North as far as the country Chad, the Sudan, and Northern Eritrea are said to be inhabited by Akisho and many Dir tribes.

The city of Dire Dawa was originally called Dir Dhabe and used to be part of Adal Sultanate during the medieval times and was exclusively settled by Dir clan which is a major Somali tribe. The Akisho name is originally derived from "Cayisho" which means, in old Somali, the (Cayilsan) "Fat One." The Gurgurre are very closely related to the Akisho, use a nickname and were referred to the Oromo and Somalis as the traders or Gurgure from the old Somali and Oromo word "gorgortan" which means one who sells and trades.

According to the folklore historians of the Southern Suure Dir of the Mudug region, the Akisho, wardey, jiido, Gurre, and the jarso, Gurgur, layile,magadle,gariire, Madahweyne Dir produced some of the most famous Somali folk heroes like the Somali queen Araweelo who was Warre Miyo. Also the Akisho and Gurgure clans were instrumental in spreading the Muslim faith in the hinterlands of Ethiopia. The Sheikh Abba Hussein in Southern Ethiopia is said to be of Dir, as well as Awbarkadleh and Awbuube who are two major saints of the Somalis. Currently Muhiyadiin Odowa is the Sultan of the Akisho. Famous people of the Akisho clan are Ahmed Gurey Arawelo and Oday Biiqay.

The information in contained in this Response was provided by Matt Bryden, a consultant and Somali specialist now working with the United Nations Institute for Research on Social Development (UNRISD) in Nairobi (16 June 1998). He stated that the Akisho "are related to the Dir clan family, and live mainly between Jigjiga [in Ethiopia], Hargeysa and many regions in Ethiopia. In Somalia, they have been awarded a seat in the constituent assembly. They face no threat of persecution in any of the areas in which they live." The Research Directorate was unable to corroborate the Akisho's participation in the constituent assembly nor whether they face "persecution."

According to the Ethiopian Review the Akisho may be more numerous in Ethiopia than they are in Somalia (30 April 1996). For additional information on the Dir clan and the Akisho sub clan, please consult Patrick Gilkes' The Price of Peace: Somalia and the United Nations 1991–1994 pages 144–148, and the appendix of Somali clan families.

== Clan tree ==
The Akisho clan consists of 12 major sub-clans:

- Akisho
    - Miyo (Maya)
      - Reer Warfaa
      - Reer Dalal
      - Reer Robleh
      - Reer Gadiid
      - Reer Hawadee
      - Reer Buuke
      - Reer Agal
  - Reer-Bito
  - Reer-Dayo
  - Reer-Luujo
      - Reer Geedi
      - Ali Idoora
      - Ali Libaan
      - Ali Ibrahim
    - -Reer-Ito
          - Ree Rooble
          - Ree cadaawe
          - Ree Tukale
          - Ree kibriidle
    - Kiyo
    - Reer Adeele
    - Reer Cadow
    - Reer Geele
    - Reer Allaale
    - Reer Xildiid
    - Reer-Heebaan (Curad Akisho)
    - -Reer-Kurto
  - Obo
    - Liban
      - Jire
        - Reer Biiqe
        - Rear Abayu
      - Warimani
    - Suubo
  - Igo
    - Reer Ismaacil
    - Reer Wadhow

There is no clear agreement on the clan and sub-clan structures and many lineages are omitted. The following listing is taken from the World Bank's Conflict in Somalia: Drivers and Dynamics from 2005 and the United Kingdom's Home Office publication, Somalia Assessment 2001.

- Dir
- Akisho
  - Issa
  - Gadabuursi
  - Biimaal "Bimal"
  - Surre
  - Isaaq
  - Quranyow of the Garre "Gorajno"
  - Gurgura "Gurgure"
  - Garrire "Gerire"
  - Bajimal "Bajumal"
  - Gurre "Goorre"

In the south central part of Somalia the World Bank shows the following clan tree:

- Dir (Madaxwayne Dir)

1.Akisho 2. Layiile 3. Gurre 4. Gurgure 5. Gariire 6. Jaarso 7. Jiido 8. Wardey

== Notable figures ==
- Ahmed Gurey

Ref: Futūḥ al-Ḥabasha. (n.d.). Christian-Muslim Relations 1500–1900. doi:10.1163/2451-9537_cmrii_com_26077
