= Mouna-Hodan Ahmed =

Djiboutian writer

Mouna-Hodan Ahmed (Somali: Muna Axmed) (born 1972) is a writer from Djibouti, one of the few women writers in the country. Born into a family of five children, she completed her primary and secondary schooling in Djibouti before pursuing higher education in France. She then returned to her native country to teach. Her first novel, Les enfants du khat, was published in 2002.
