= Awrajja =

Former subdivisions of Provinces in Ethiopia

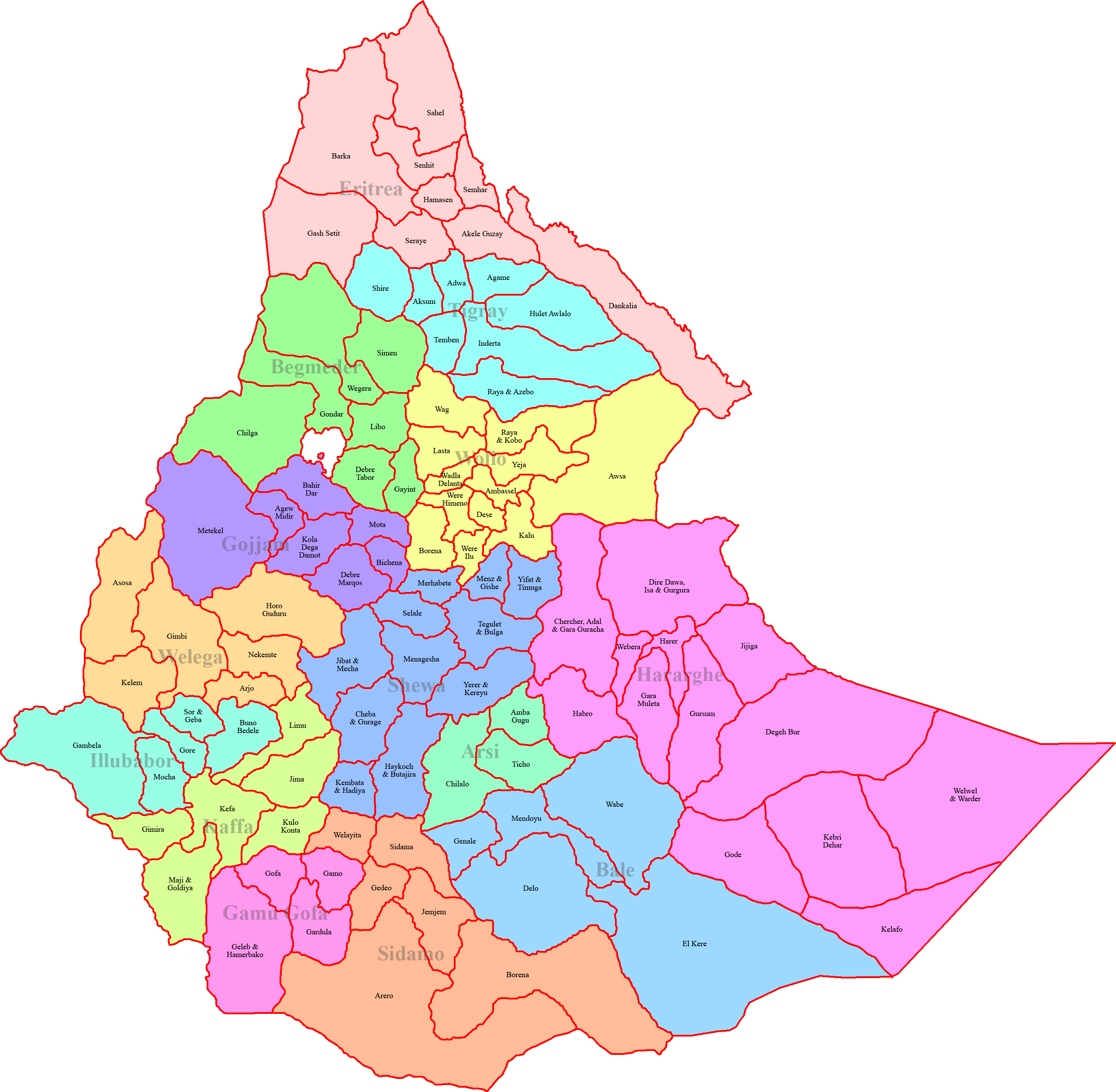
A map of the former Awrajjas of Ethiopia

Awrajja (Amharic: አውራጃ) were the third-level country subdivisions which subdivided the Provinces of Ethiopia prior to 1996. Awrajja roughly translates to "county" or "sub-province", and contained a number of "woreda" or districts, the fourth level subdivision of Ethiopia. In 1996, the provinces and awrajja of Ethiopia were replaced with Regions (Kilil) and Zones, and Awrajja ceased to serve an administrative function, though they retain cultural significance.
