= Nima Djama =

- Birth name: Nimco Jaamac Migil
- Born: 1948; Ali Sabieh, Djibouti
- Origin: Djibouti
- Genres: Djiboutian music
- Occupation: Singer
- Years active: 1960s-present

Nima Djama (Somali: Nimco Jaamac; born 1948) is a composer and singer from Djibouti. In 1976, Nima Djama sang a famous patriotic tune for Djibouti independence. She is also heavily involved in Djiboutian politics.

== Biography ==
Nima Djama was born in 1948 in Ali Sabieh, situated in the southern of Djibouti. She came from a nomadic family from the Issa sub-clan of the Somali. She started singing in 1969 at the age of 21. Djama sang in protest against the French administration refusing to give a fair referendum for her country to become an independent nation. There was vote rigging in the referendum of 1967. After that song (called "Gabdhayahow"), she became popular across the country. She then joined the cultural troupe as a Somali singer Now she lives in Ottawa, Canada.

"Buuraha u dheer" sung by Nima Djama

=== Singles ===
- Gaban Mayno (1976)
- Buuraha u dheer (1980)
- Qalbigu Waa Meel Qudha (1981)
- Adoo meel foog joogo (1982)
- Gacanteyda meel sare (2000)
- Qoomamayn (1999)
- Dibnaha (2000)
- Naxariis (2000)
- Caalanka (2007)

== See also ==
- Music of Djibouti
