= Gurre =

Somali sub-clan

The Gurre or Gurra (Somali: Gurre) also known xasan ali madaxweyne dir in the north of the Somali peninsula as the Gurre ali is a Somali clan. They are part of the sub-clan of the Dir clan family and primarily live in the Somali Region of Ethiopia and the North Eastern province of Kenya.

== Distribution ==
The Gurre live in Mano zone and Afder zone. Guradamole, Somali (woreda) They dominate the districts, Qarsadula, Gurrebaqaaqsa and Gurredhamole, which are named after the Gurre clan, but also live in Elkare, Afder and West-Imi districts.Gurre community also live in Wargadud county of Mandera, Kenya.

== Clan tree ==
The following listing is taken from the World Bank's Conflict in Somalia: Drivers and Dynamics from 2005 and the United Kingdom's Home Office publication, Somalia Assessment 2001.

- Dir
  - Madaxweyne Dir
    - Cali Madaxweyne
      - Gurre/ Gurro
        - Reer Ya'co
        - Reer Jaarso
        - Reer Waajo
        - Reer Eejo
        - Reer Dhanqo
        - Reer Yacanbaabo
        - Reer Liibaan

== Notable figures ==
- Ahmed Shide
