= Arhiba FC =

Arhiba
- Full name: Arhiba Football Club
- Ground: El Hadj Hassan Gouled Aptidon Stadium
- Capacity: 20,000
- League: Djibouti Division 2
- 2021–22: Djibouti Premier League, 10th of 10 (relegated)

Arhiba FC, or simply Arhiba, is a Djiboutian football club located in Arhiba, Djibouti. It currently plays in the Djibouti Division 2.

== History ==
In 2017, Arhiba made news for receiving 25 Celtic shirts donated by Moussa Dembele.

Arhiba has competed in both the first and second tiers of Djiboutian football. The club won the Djibouti Division 2 in the 2020–21 season, finishing first with 38 points from 18 matches. Arhiba recorded 11 wins, five draws and two defeats, scoring 57 goals and conceding 26. The result earned the club promotion to the Djibouti Premier League alongside EAD/PK 12.

== Stadium ==
Currently the team plays at the 10,000 capacity Stade du Ville.
