= Xabiiba Cabdilaahi =

Djiboutian singer (1961–2020)

Xabiiba Balbalaaf Xabiiba Cabdilaahi
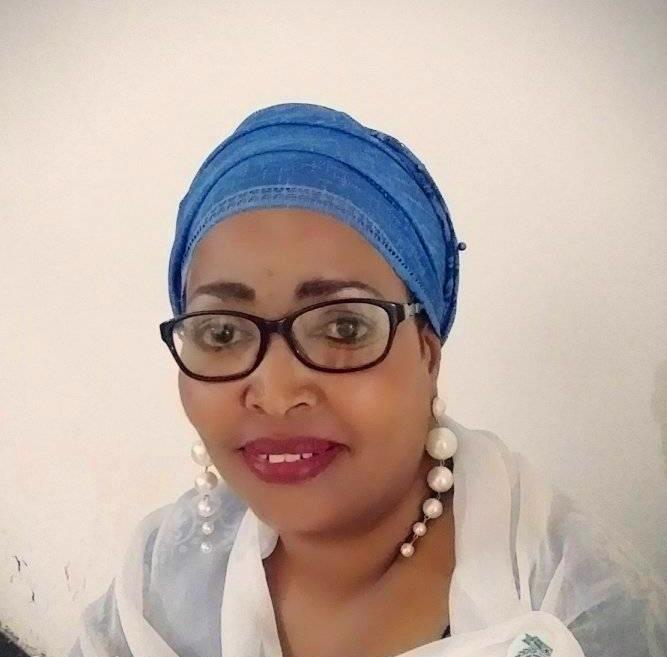

Background information
- Birth name: Habiba Abdillah Waberi
- Born: 8 July 1961; Djibouti, French Somaliland
- Origin: Djibouti
- Died: 23 June 2020 (aged 58); Djibouti City, Djibouti
- Genres: Djiboutian music
- Occupation: Singer
- Instrument: Vocals
- Years active: 1982–2020

Xabiiba Balbalaaf (Somali: Xabiiba Cabdilaahi), (8 July 1961 – 23 June 2020) was a prominent Djiboutian singer.

== Biography ==
Habiba Abdillah Waberi was born on the 8 July 1961 in Djibouti, French Somaliland. She lived with her family in Quartier 6, Djibouti City. She first performed on stage at the age of 21 with the group Gacan Macan and began her artistic career in 1982. She hailed from the Issa, Somali. It is one of the nation's recognized Somali clan groups in Djibouti. As of the 1990s, she was dominating the Djiboutian music scene. She often made use of satire, metaphor and historical allusions to convey complex themes in an understandable manner. Her songs were dotted with stories of love, journey and hope. Xabiiba was a prominent figure in traditional Djiboutian music.

On June 23, 2020, Habiba died in Peltier Hospital in Djibouti City, Djibouti.

== Music ==
Popular songs by Xabiiba Cabdilaahi include:

- Geesi
- Farsamo
- Bashahaygow

"Bashahaygow" sung by Xabiba Balbalaf

== See also ==
- Music of Djibouti
