= Ahmed Goumane-Roble =

Djiboutian politician

Ahmed Goumane Roble (Somali: Axmed Guman Rooble) (5 January 1923 – 20 February 2013) was a Djiboutian politician who was elected to the French Senate in 1958.

== Biography ==
He served for ten years in the French army, where he rose to the rank of master sergeant. His courage in combat earned him the combatant's medal and the 1939-1945 Croix de Guerre.

Returning to civilian life, he traded, while engaging in public life: elected to the Territorial Council, he became his vice-presidency.

During the election of 8 June 1958 to the Council of the Republic, he won the seat attributed to the French Somali Coast by beating, by 18 votes to 7 out of 31 cast, the outgoing Hassan Gouled, thanks to the support of the RDA of which he has the label.

Goumane-Roble died on 20 February 2013, at the age of 90.
