= Daher Ahmed Farah =

Djiboutian politician

Daher Ahmed Farah, (Somali: Daahir Axmed Faarax) also known as DAF, is a Djiboutian politician and writer, who was born in 1962 in Dikhil.

== Biography ==
=== Training ===
In 1983 Farah was an Inter-African admission to the annual entry competition at the Special Military School of Saint-Cyr and studied management at Reims and Limoges. Farah served in the Djibouti army from 1983 to 1991. In 1991, he began working at the government newspaper The Nation, briefly becoming the editor in 1992.

=== Political activities ===
In 1994, he participated in the formation of the Democratic Renewal Party (PRD) with Mohamed Djama Elabe and Suleiman Farah Lodon and became its president in July 1997. He was jailed in October 1997 for management of an illegal political party, in August 1999 for publishing false news, in June 2001 for concealment of public documents, and in August 2003 for defamation.

He then left Djibouti and fled to Brussels where he heads the "Movement for Democratic Renewal and Development". He took Belgian nationality. In 2013, he returned to Djibouti under the banner of the Union for national salvation (USN - opposition) in the parliamentary elections of 22 February 2013, finally officially won by the ruling party. Not elected, he was arrested again on March 5 and sentenced to three months in prison on March 17, 2013. He was provisionally released six weeks later on 12 May, after serving six weeks in prison, however he still faced charges of “being in contact with a foreign power” and “undermining the army’s morale.”

On 26 June 2013, an appeals court found Farah guilty of "refusing to comply with a judicial order" and sentenced him to a two-month jail sentence. He surrendered to authorities on 2 July, and was immediately jailed. He was released after again serving six weeks in jail, on 14 August. In September, he traveled to Brussels, Belgium, where he organized demonstrations. On 1 October, he returned to Djibouti and was immediately arrested and imprisoned.
