= Aden Farah Samatar =

- Born: 1943 (age 82–83); Ali Sabieh, French Somaliland
- Genre: Djiboutian music
- Occupation: Musician
- Instrument: Vocals
- Years active: 1963–present

Aden Farah Samatar was a well-known Djiboutian songwriter, composer, poet and singer. Aden's art was noted for its emphasis on political justice. He sang for Djiboutian independence during the 1970s with the Arreh Group.

== Personal life ==
Aden was born in Ali Sabieh, French Somaliland. During his teenage years he lived in Ali Sabieh and Djibouti where he grew up. He began to sing in 1963 with the Group Arreh and afterwards with the large Group Gacan Macan. Aden, along with other first generation artists such as Aden Elmi God, Said Xamar Qoodh, Ibrahim Souleiman Gadhle and Roda Ahmed, was among the pioneers of modern Djiboutian music.

== See also ==
- Music of Djibouti
