= Moumina Houssein Darar =

Djiboutian policewoman

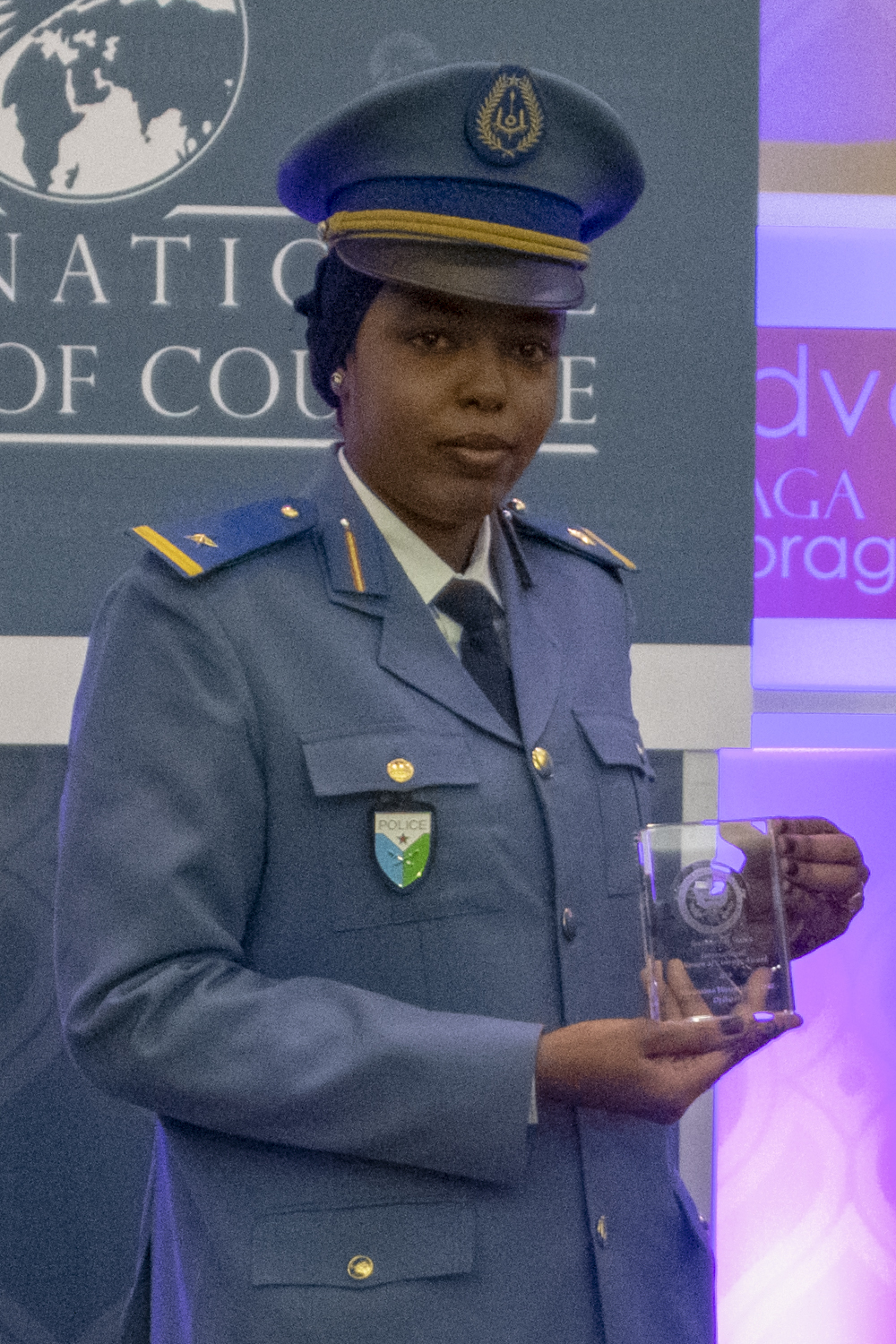
- Moumina Houssein Darar
- Born: 1 June 1990 (age 34); Ali Sabieh, Djibouti
- Occupation: Police officer
- Known for: Anti-terrorism

Moumina Houssein Darar (Somali: Muumina Xuseen Darar; Arabic: مؤمنة حسين درار) is a Djiboutian anti-terrorism police investigator. She was recognised as a Woman of Courage by the American Secretary of State in 2019.

== Life ==
Moumina Houssein Darar was the eldest of a family of eight children. After obtaining a degree in English in 2012, she joined the ranks of the Djibouti Police in 2013. She soon specialized in anti-terrorism investigations as a senior investigator. She was involved in high-profile investigations that resulted in the conviction or expulsion of many Al-Shabaab terrorists. This allowed the Djiboutian National Police (DNP) to thwart several planned terrorist attacks following the attack of La Chaumière, in 2014 in Djibouti.

She has created a neighborhood charity to help children in need, as well as to provide other services and assistance to help the local community.

She received on 7 March 2019 the Woman of Courage award by Mike Pompeo, the US Secretary of State.
