= Fadumo Ahmed Dhimbiil =

Djiboutian poet, rapper, singer, and songwriter

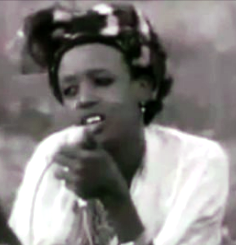

Background information
- Birth name: Faadumo Axmed Dhimbiil
- Born: 1948 Djibouti, French Somaliland
- Origin: Djibouti
- Died: May 24, 2018 (aged 69–70)
- Genres: Djiboutian music
- Occupation: Musician
- Years active: 1967–2018

Fadumo Ahmed Dhimbiil (Somali: Faadumo Axmed Dhimbiil; 1948 – May 24, 2018) was a Djiboutian poet, singer, and songwriter.

== Biography ==
Fadumo Ahmed Dhimbiil was born in 1948 in Djibouti, French Somaliland. She lived with her family in Quartier 6, Djibouti City. At 19 years old, she went to Mogadishu, Somalia in 1967, where she met with Mohamed Ibrahim Warsame Hadraawi, Jama Saleban Tubeec, Mohamed Jama Ilkacase and Mohamed Said Baandey. She directed a play with Abdirahman Hassan Sheikh (Abu Dhabi), Mohamed Said Baandey, Asli Khatre Gabon and Jama Dub Dubhi, and the group started from Baidoa, Beledweyne, Galkayo, Qardho, Burao until they returned to Mogadishu. She returned to Djibouti in 1975. In the 1976 poet Ibrahim Gadhle created a drama called "national struggle and misery" in which the people of Djibouti wanted independence from French colonialism. In 1978 she also worked with the band Gaan Maan under the leadership of the poet Aden Farah Samatar since 1971. She moved to the Netherlands and then to the United Kingdom in the 1990s. She returned to Djibouti in 2004.

On 24 May 2018, Fatima died in Turkey and she was buried in Djibouti on 25 May 2018.

== See also ==
- Music of Djibouti
