= Abdo Xamar Qoodh =

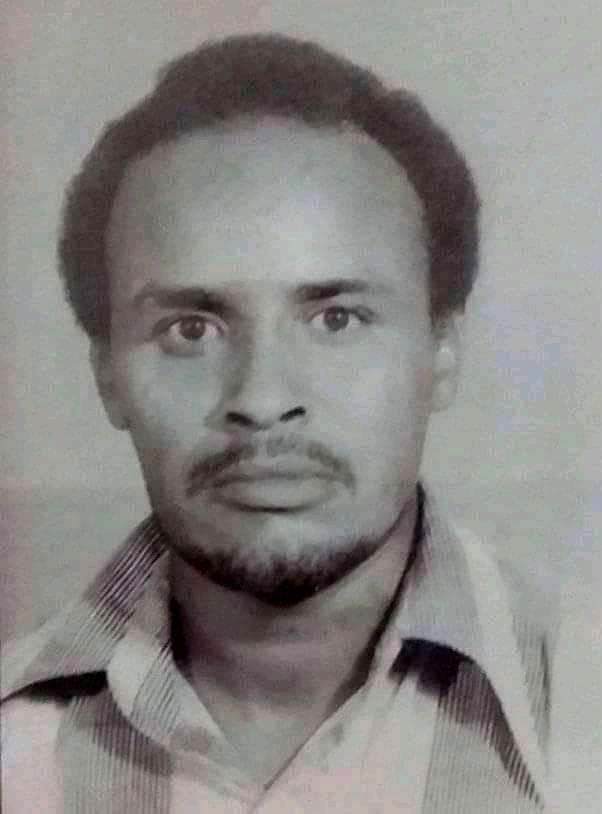

Background information
- Born: Abdo Ismael Bouh; 1949; Ali Sabieh, French Somaliland
- Died: August 8, 1991 (aged 42) Djibouti City, Djibouti
- Genres: Djiboutian music
- Occupation: Musician
- Instrument: vocals
- Years active: 1963–1991

Abdo Xamar Qoodh (Somali: Cabdo Xamar Qoodh) was a well-known Djiboutian songwriter, composer and singer.

== Biography ==
Abdo Ismael Bouh (Somali: Cabdo Ismaaciil Buux) was born to an artistic family in Ali Sabieh, French Somaliland in 1949. The son of Ismael Bouh and Amina Omar. He grew up in Ali Sabieh, where he attended primary schools. He move to Djibouti, the nation's capital, and began his secondary education. Abdo's involvement with music began at a very early age, with him first taking up singing during childhood. He started his music career in 1960s, he started singing at an early teenage with his older brother, Said Xamar Qoodh. Abdo Hamargod and Said Hamargod is regarded by many Djiboutians to be one's of the greatest Djiboutian musicians to have ever lived. His songs were stories of love and journeys.

"Dhooley" sung by Abdo Xamar Qoodh

Abdo had a significant influence on newer generations of Djiboutian musicians in the 1970s and 1980s.

On the 8 August 1991, Abdo died in Peltier Hospital in Djibouti City, Djibouti.

== Music ==
Popular songs by Abdo Xamar Qoodh include:

- Dhooley
- Ubaxeey
- Cawaan Uliita Wadnaha Ii Lulmanaye
- Leleel

== See also ==
- Music of Djibouti
