= Ali Oune =

- Town
- Location in Djibouti
- Coordinates: 11°23′N 43°08′E
- Country: Djibouti
- Region: Ali Sabieh
- Elevation: 152 m (499 ft)

Population (2013)
  - Total: 501

Ali Oune is a small town located in Ali Sabieh Region of Djibouti. It is situated about 22 km (14 mi) south of Djibouti City and 7 km (4.3 mi) east of the border with Somalia.

== Overview ==
Nearby towns and villages include Holhol (26 km), Damerjog (14 km), Goubetto (18 km) and Ali Sabieh (57 km).
