= Anaba, Djibouti =

Anaba عنابة
- Town
- Location in Djibouti
- Coordinates: 11°20′N 42°56′E
- Country: Djibouti
- Region: Ali Sabieh
- Elevation: 400 m (1,300 ft)

Population (2019)
  - Total: 326

Anaba (Arabic: عنابة) is a town in the Ali Sabieh Region of Djibouti. It is located 34 km south-west of the capital, Djibouti City.

== Overview ==
It lies on the National Highway 5. Nearby towns and villages include Dasbiyo (24 km), Holhol (5 km) and Goubetto (22 km).

== Demographics ==
The town inhabitants belong to various mainly Afro-Asiatic-speaking ethnic groups, with the Issa Somali predominant.
