= List of buildings and structures in Djibouti =

Buildings and structures in Djibouti include:

- List of airports in Djibouti
- List of lighthouses in Djibouti
- List of mosques in Djibouti
- List of museums in Djibouti
- List of power stations in Djibouti
- Railway stations in Djibouti

Additional individual buildings and structures:

- Amea Grand Bara Solar Power Station
- El Hadj Hassan Gouled Aptidon Stadium
- Evangelical Protestant Church of Djibouti
- Holhol Defence Training Center
- Lycée Français de Djibouti
- Our Lady of the Good Shepherd Cathedral, Djibouti

== See also ==
- Djibouti City
