= Rahle Godle =

Mountain in Djibouti

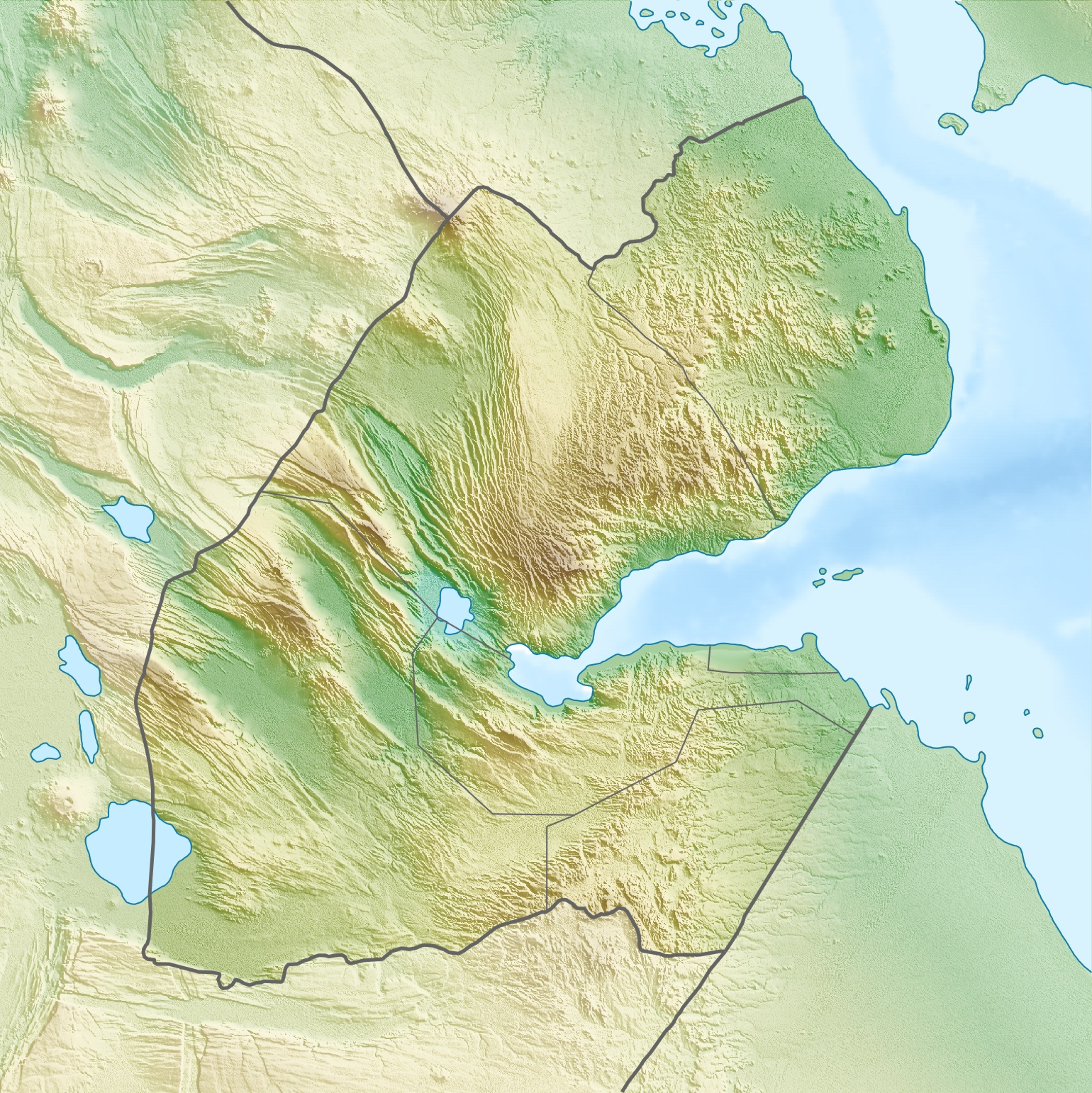
- Location within Djibouti

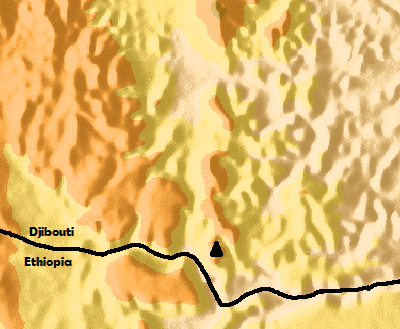
- Location

Highest point
- Elevation: 764 m (2,507 ft)
- Coordinates: 10°58′59″N 42°52′01″E

Geography
- Country: Djibouti
- Region: Ali Sabieh Region

Rahle Godle is a mountain in the Ali Sabieh Region of southern Djibouti. With an average elevation of 764 metres (2,507 feet) above sea level, it is located near the border with Ethiopia. Rahle Godle lies approximately 5 kilometres (3.1 miles) east of Assamo, and 13 kilometres (8.1 miles) from Guisti by road.
