= Guisti =

Guisti جويستي
- Village
- Location in Djibouti
- Coordinates: 11°00′50″N 42°57′35″E
- Country: Djibouti
- Region: Ali Sabieh
- Elevation: 448 m (1,470 ft)

Population (2019)
  - Total: 811

Guisti (Arabic: جويستي) is a town located in southeastern of Ali Sabieh Region. It is situated about 32 kilometres (20 miles) Southeast of Ali Sabieh, near the borders with Somaliland and Ethiopia.

== Overview ==
The town lies along on a river. Nearby towns and villages include Holhol (42 km), Assamo (18 km) and Ali Adde (17 km).

== Geography ==
Guisti is in the Region of Ali Sabieh, its situated on a spur of a plateau, an upland characterized by one major wadi which run beside it. Guisti is near the borders of Somaliland to the east and Ethiopia to the south. Much of the landscape is rocky and arid, with desert vegetation and wildlife.

=== Climate ===
Guisti has a hot arid climate (Köppen: BWh) with hot and dry, prolonged summers and mild winters.

Climate data for Guisti
Month	Jan	Feb	Mar	Apr	May	Jun	Jul	Aug	Sep	Oct	Nov	Dec	Year
Mean daily maximum °C (°F)	25.5 (77.9)	27.0 (80.6)	29.7 (85.5)	30.2 (86.4)	33.7 (92.7)	38.9 (102.0)	38.6 (101.5)	37.1 (98.8)	35.5 (95.9)	30.4 (86.7)	27.3 (81.1)	26.1 (79.0)	31.7 (89.0)
Mean daily minimum °C (°F)	19.0 (66.2)	19.5 (67.1)	21.7 (71.1)	23.5 (74.3)	25.9 (78.6)	27.7 (81.9)	26.9 (80.4)	26.5 (79.7)	24.4 (75.9)	23.3 (73.9)	20.9 (69.6)	19.1 (66.4)	23.2 (73.8)
Average rainfall mm (inches)	12 (0.5)	10 (0.4)	16 (0.6)	29 (1.1)	15 (0.6)	3 (0.1)	18 (0.7)	39 (1.5)	28 (1.1)	9 (0.4)	14 (0.6)	6 (0.2)	199 (7.8)
Source: Climate-Data

== Demographics ==
As of 2012, the population of Guisti has been estimated to be 500. The town inhabitants belong to various mainly Afro-Asiatic-speaking ethnic groups, with the Gadabursi and Issa Somali predominant.
