= Danan =

Danan may refer to:

== Places ==
- Danan (volcano), one of the three volcanic cones of the island of Krakatoa
- Danan (Amran), sub-district located in Al Ashah District, 'Amran Governorate, Yemen
- Danan (woreda), a district in eastern Ethiopia
- Danan, Ethiopia, the town the district in Ethiopia is named for
- Dânan, small town in Djibouti
- Danan, Iran, a village in Kurdistan Province, Iran

== People ==
- Danan Henry (born 1939), American Roshi in the Harada-Yasutani lineage
- Danan Hughes (born 1970), American football wide receiver
- Elora Danan, fictional character introduced in the 1988 fantasy film Willow
- Paul Danan (1978–2025), English actor
- Saadia Ibn Danan (died c. 1493), grammarian of Hebrew and Arabic and poet

== Other ==
- Danan: The Jungle Fighter, 1990 Master System game in Brazil and Europe

== See also ==
- Danaan
- Danann
- Danann (disambiguation)
