= Dânan =

Dânan دهان
- Town
- Location in Djibouti
- Coordinates: 11°13′N 42°59′E
- Country: Djibouti
- Region: Ali Sabieh
- Elevation: 360 m (1,180 ft)

Population (2019)
  - Total: 463

Dânan (Somali: Dhanaan, Arabic: دهان) is a town in the Ali Sabieh Region of Djibouti. It is located around 43 kilometers south of the capital, Djibouti City.

== Overview ==
Nearby towns and villages include Holhol (12 km) and Ali Adde (22 km).

== Demographics ==
The population of Dânan has been estimated to be 463. The town inhabitants belong to various mainly Afro-Asiatic-speaking ethnic groups, with the Issa Somali predominant.
