= Anaba =

Anaba may refer to:

- Annaba, Algeria
- Anaba, Djibouti
- Anaba District, Afghanistan

== Other uses ==
- Anaba, a Japanese term meaning a great place not many people know about
