= Dasbiyo =

Dasbiyo Daasbiyo داسبييو
- Town
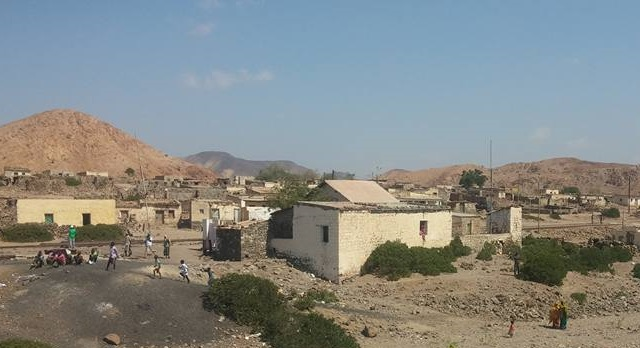

- Location in Djibouti
- Coordinates: 11°15′N 42°47′E
- Country: Djibouti
- Region: Ali Sabieh
- Established: 10th century
- Elevation: 581 m (1,906 ft)

Population (2019)
  - Total: 1,750

Dasbiyo (Somali: Daasbiyo, Arabic: داسبييو) is a town in southern Djibouti. It is served by a station on the old Ethio-Djibouti Railways. The surrounding district is rich in both livestock and fledgeling agriculture.

== History ==
The town played an important role in trade between the port cities of Zeila, and the hinterland with houses constructed of mud and stone and some Aqal's. Where nomadics use to stopping here for water on the way to Zeila or Harar. Tumuli and vestiges have been found in and around Daasbiyo, once dynamic and prosperous possessing a well on its bed of wadi which crossed it. It was also a religious crossroads between the 10th and the 12th centuries, Islam only penetrated towards the end of the 13th century, whereas Zeila became much Muslim from the 6th century onwards. According to the twelfth-century Jewish traveler Benjamin of Tudela, the Zeila region was the land of the Havilah, confined by al-Habash in the west.

== Overview ==
Dasbiyo is 19 kilometres (11 mi) south of Holhol, 17 kilometres (10 mi) northwest of Ali Adde, 15 kilometres (9 mi) northeast of Ali Sabieh, and 62 kilometres (38 mi) southeast of Djibouti City.

== Geography ==
Dasbiyo is located in the south of Djibouti and the west of the Region of Ali Sabieh. It is built in a plain at the foot of the Hadla Mountains 581 metres (1,906 feet) above sea level.

=== Climate ===
Dasbiyo has a hot arid climate (BWh) by the Köppen-Geiger system. The town experiences long, hot to sweltering, dry summers, and mild winters. Occasionally, Dasbiyo has heavy rains where the precipitation for the entire year will fall over the course of a few days.

Climate data for Dasbiyo
Month	Jan	Feb	Mar	Apr	May	Jun	Jul	Aug	Sep	Oct	Nov	Dec	Year
Mean daily maximum °C (°F)	25.0 (77.0)	25.8 (78.4)	26.3 (79.3)	28.8 (83.8)	32.7 (90.9)	37.8 (100.0)	37.3 (99.1)	36.8 (98.2)	34.3 (93.7)	29.5 (85.1)	26.9 (80.4)	25.7 (78.3)	30.6 (87.0)
Mean daily minimum °C (°F)	17.0 (62.6)	18.5 (65.3)	20.0 (68.0)	21.4 (70.5)	24.5 (76.1)	26.3 (79.3)	26.0 (78.8)	25.2 (77.4)	24.4 (75.9)	22.2 (72.0)	19.4 (66.9)	17.5 (63.5)	21.9 (71.4)
Average rainfall mm (inches)	10 (0.4)	16 (0.6)	20 (0.8)	29 (1.1)	3 (0.1)	3 (0.1)	18 (0.7)	39 (1.5)	23 (0.9)	9 (0.4)	27 (1.1)	7 (0.3)	204 (8)
Source: Climate-Data.org, altitude: 581 metres or 1,906 feet

== Demographics ==
The population of Dasbiyo has been estimated to be 1,750. The town inhabitants belong to various mainly Afro-Asiatic-speaking ethnic groups, with the Issa Somali predominant.
