= Amea Grand Bara Solar Power Station =

Solar farm in Djibouti

- Country: Djibouti
- Location: Ali Sabieh, Ali Sabieh Region
- Coordinates: 11°07′23″N 42°41′20″E
- Status: Proposed
- Construction began: 2024 Expected
- Commission date: 2025 Expected
- Owner: Amea Power
- Operator: Amea Power

Solar farm
- Type: Flat-panel PV

Power generation
- Nameplate capacity: 25 MW (34,000 hp)
- Annual net output: 55 GWh

Not to be confused with Engie Grand Bara Solar Power Station

The Amea Grand Bara Solar Power Station is a planned 25 MW (34,000 hp) solar power plant in Djibouti. When commercially commissioned, it will be the country's first and largest grid-connected solar farm.

== Location ==
The power station would be located in the Grand Bara Desert, in the Ali Sabieh Region, in southeast Djibouti, close to the international borders with Ethiopia and Somaliland.

== Overview ==
The power station design has 25 megawatt capacity. It will also be fitted with a battery storage facility with capacity of 5 MWh. Its annual generation is calculated at 55 GWh.

The power generated at this solar farm is expected to be sold directly to Electricité de Djibouti (EDD), the national electricity utility monopoly for 25 years after commercial commissioning. The power purchase agreements (PPAs), governing the purchase and supply of power between the station developers and the government of Djibouti were signed in late August 2023.

== Developers ==
The power station is under development by a consortium comprising Amea Power, an independent power producer (IPP) based in Dubai, United Arab Emirates and the Sovereign Fund of Djibouti (FSD), as minority shareholder.

== Construction costs, funding, and commissioning ==
The power station is being developed under a Build-Own-Operate and Transfer (BOOT) model.

== See also ==
- List of power stations in Djibouti
