= LFD =

LFD may refer to:

- Large format display, a flat-screen television used for advertising signage
- Lateral flow device (or test), in medicine
- Lingfield railway station, Surrey, England
- Lycée Français de Delhi, a French school in India
- Lycée Français de Djibouti, a French school in Djibouti

== See also ==
- L4D
