= Chabelley =

Chabelley Shabeelle
- Village
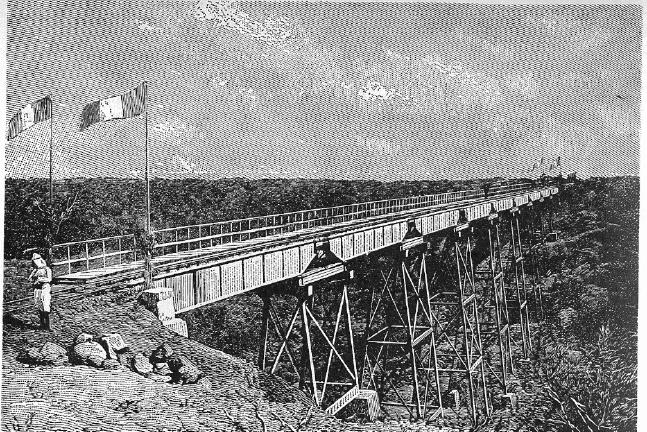
- The old Ethio-Djibouti Railroad bridge at Chabelley in 1898

- Location in Djibouti
- Coordinates: 11°29′21″N 43°04′32″E
- Country: Djibouti
- Region: Arta
- Elevation: 142 m (466 ft)

Population (2019)
  - Total: 1,011

Chabelley (Somali: Shabeelle), (Arabic: شبيلي) is a village in the southern Arta region of Djibouti. It lies less than 13 km from the capital Djibouti City.

== Demographics ==
As of 2019, Chabelley has a population of around 1,011 inhabitants. Most residents belong to various mainly Afro-Asiatic-speaking ethnic groups, with the Gadabursi and Issa Somali predominant.

== Transportation ==
The Ethio-Djibouti Railways passes through the village. Nearby towns and villages include Ali Sabieh (65 km), Goubetto (15 km), Ali Adde (55 km) and Holhol (29 km).

Some 1.5 miles north of Chabelley is Chabelley Airport, a desert airstrip until recently exclusively reserved in case of need for French military devices. In September 2013, the airstrip began serving as a temporary hub for U.S. military unmanned aircraft from the nearby Camp Lemonnier Naval Expeditionary Base.

== Climate ==
Climate data for Chabelley
Month	Jan	Feb	Mar	Apr	May	Jun	Jul	Aug	Sep	Oct	Nov	Dec	Year
Mean daily maximum °C (°F)	27.5 (81.5)	27.8 (82.0)	29.1 (84.4)	30.8 (87.4)	33.7 (92.7)	39.0 (102.2)	40.6 (105.1)	40.1 (104.2)	36.1 (97.0)	32.0 (89.6)	29.7 (85.5)	28.1 (82.6)	32.9 (91.2)
Mean daily minimum °C (°F)	19.8 (67.6)	21.0 (69.8)	22.6 (72.7)	24.2 (75.6)	25.8 (78.4)	28.1 (82.6)	30.0 (86.0)	29.5 (85.1)	27.7 (81.9)	24.5 (76.1)	22.0 (71.6)	20.0 (68.0)	24.6 (76.3)
Average rainfall mm (inches)	12 (0.5)	19 (0.7)	22 (0.9)	29 (1.1)	17 (0.7)	2 (0.1)	6 (0.2)	6 (0.2)	8 (0.3)	21 (0.8)	25 (1.0)	13 (0.5)	180 (7)
Source: The Weather Channel

== See also ==
- Railway stations in Djibouti
