= Ali Sabieh Mountain =

Mountain in Djibouti

Mountain of the National Emblem
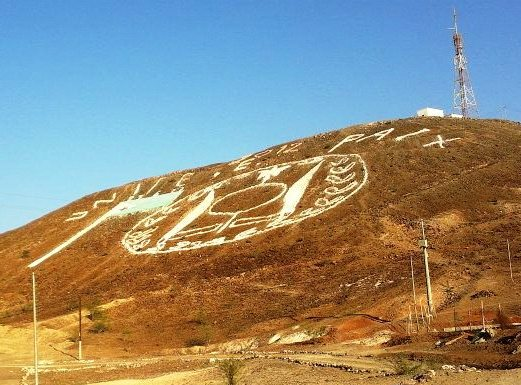
- The famous landmark of Ali Sabieh

Highest point
- Elevation: 801 m (2,628 ft)
- Coordinates: 11°09′10″N 42°42′54″E

Geography
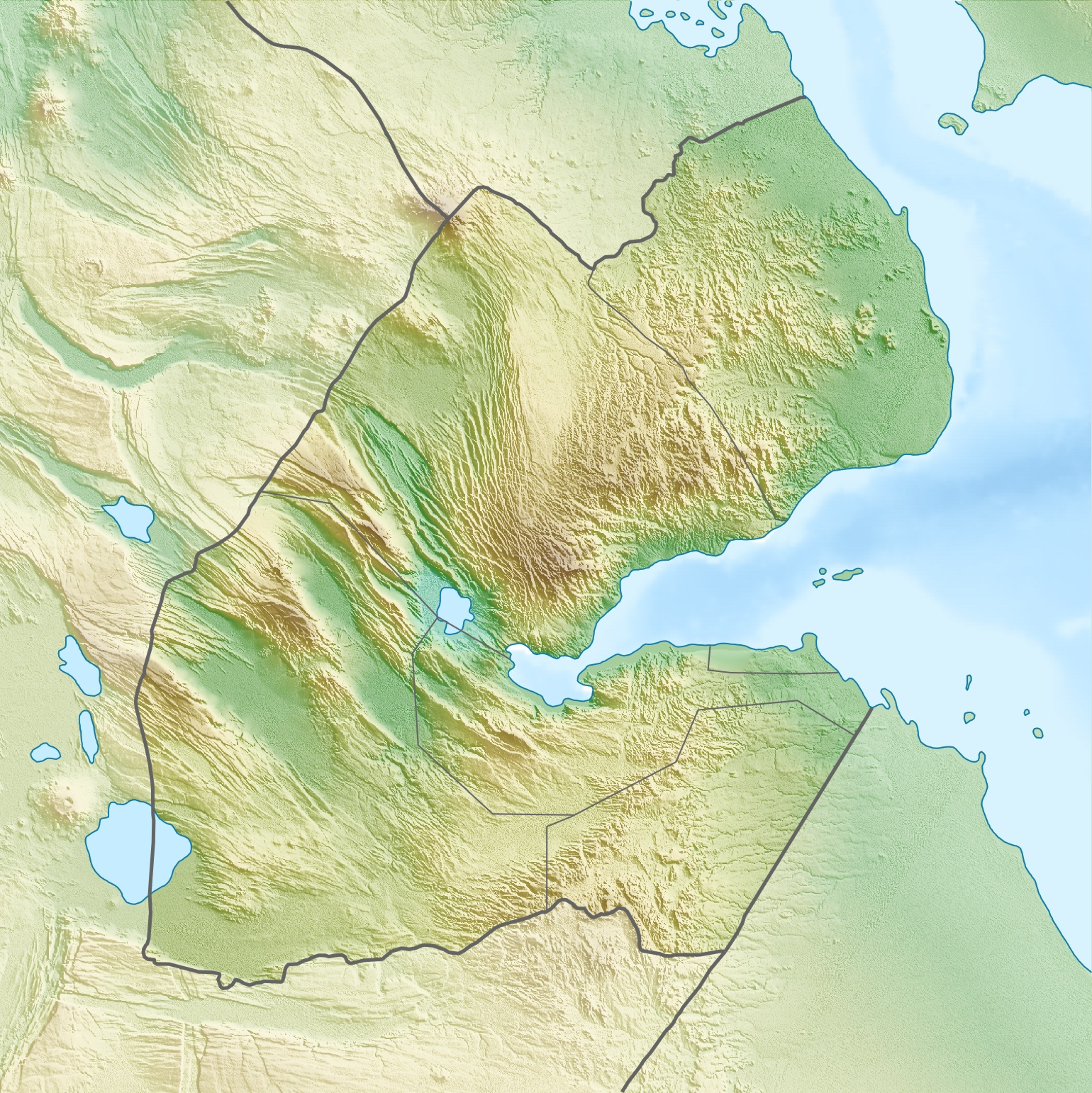
- Location within Djibouti
- Location: Ali Sabieh Region, Djibouti

Climbing
- Easiest route: Hike

The Mountain of the National Emblem (Somali: Buurta Astaanta Qaranka) is a landmark in the Ali Sabieh region of Djibouti. The national emblem of Djibouti is carved into the mountain. It overlooks Ali Sabieh and is a local landmark. The Mountain of the National Emblem is the region's top tourist attraction.

== History ==
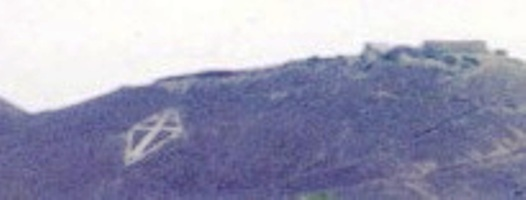
Cross of Lorraine symbol on Mountain of Ali Sabieh 1971.

In 1945, the colonial French authorities erected a sign on the mountain featuring the Cross of Lorraine symbol. It was later removed following Djibouti's independence in 1977, with the national emblem of Djibouti symbol erected in its place. In 2024 the design was updated to place two large flags of Djibouti on either side of the emblem.
