= Dadahalou =

- Location in Djibouti
- Coordinates: 11°06′28″N 42°31′46″E
- Country: Djibouti
- Region: Dikhil
- Elevation: 715 m (2,346 ft)

Dadahalou is a village in the southeastern Dikhil Region of Djibouti. It is situated approximately 25 km (15 mi) eastern of Dikhil, the regional capital.

== Overview ==
The village inhabitants belong to various mainly Afro-Asiatic speaking ethnic groups, with the Issa Somali predominant. Most of the inhabitants earned their living through animal husbandry and commerce, and used a well for drinking water. Nearby towns and villages include Mouloud (14 km), Dikhil (25 km) and Ali Sabieh (44 km).

== Climate ==
The warmest month of the year is July with an average temperature of 36.9 °C. In January, the average temperature is 25.3 °C. It is the lowest average temperature of the whole year and the driest month is December with 3 mm. Most precipitation falls in August, with an average of 45 mm.

Climate data for Dadahalou
Month	Jan	Feb	Mar	Apr	May	Jun	Jul	Aug	Sep	Oct	Nov	Dec	Year
Mean daily maximum °C (°F)	24.8 (76.6)	25.2 (77.4)	25.9 (78.6)	27.6 (81.7)	31.5 (88.7)	37.5 (99.5)	36.6 (97.9)	36.0 (96.8)	34.0 (93.2)	28.2 (82.8)	25.5 (77.9)	25.0 (77.0)	29.8 (85.7)
Mean daily minimum °C (°F)	16.0 (60.8)	17.1 (62.8)	18.4 (65.1)	20.0 (68.0)	23.3 (73.9)	26.5 (79.7)	25.7 (78.3)	25.2 (77.4)	23.5 (74.3)	20.2 (68.4)	17.7 (63.9)	16.3 (61.3)	20.8 (69.5)
Average rainfall mm (inches)	6 (0.2)	7 (0.3)	15 (0.6)	35 (1.4)	9 (0.4)	2 (0.1)	29 (1.1)	45 (1.8)	39 (1.5)	11 (0.4)	5 (0.2)	3 (0.1)	206 (8.1)
Source: The Weather Channel
