= National Highway 5 (Djibouti) =

Road in Djibouti

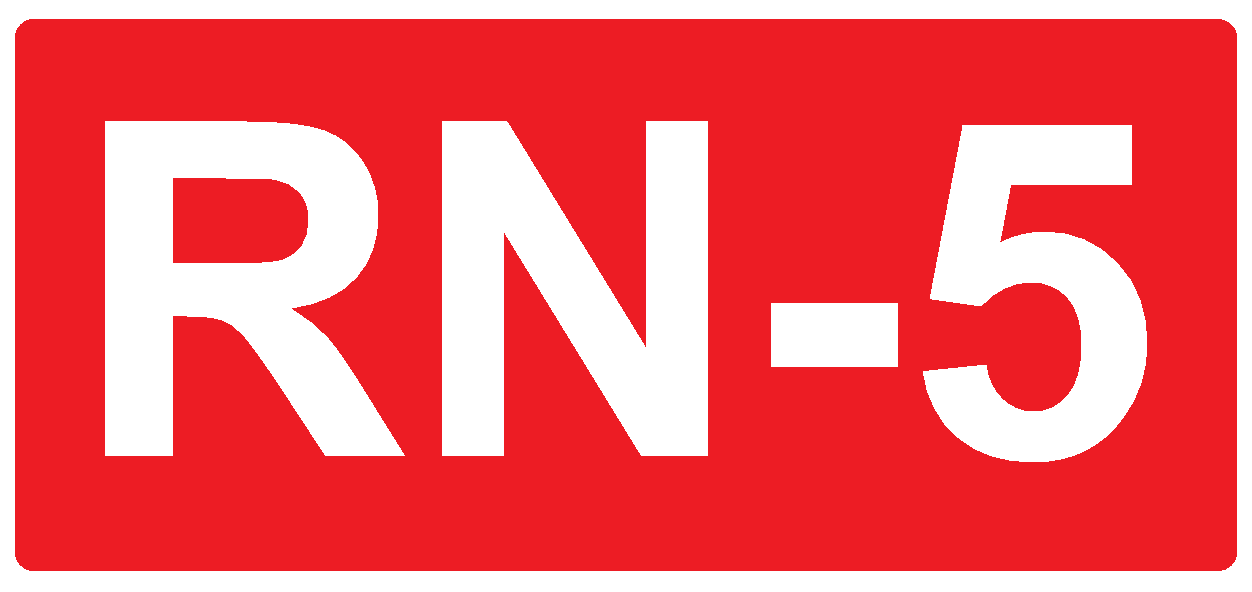
National Highway 5
- Arabic: الطريق السريع الوطنى 5 French: Route Nationale 5
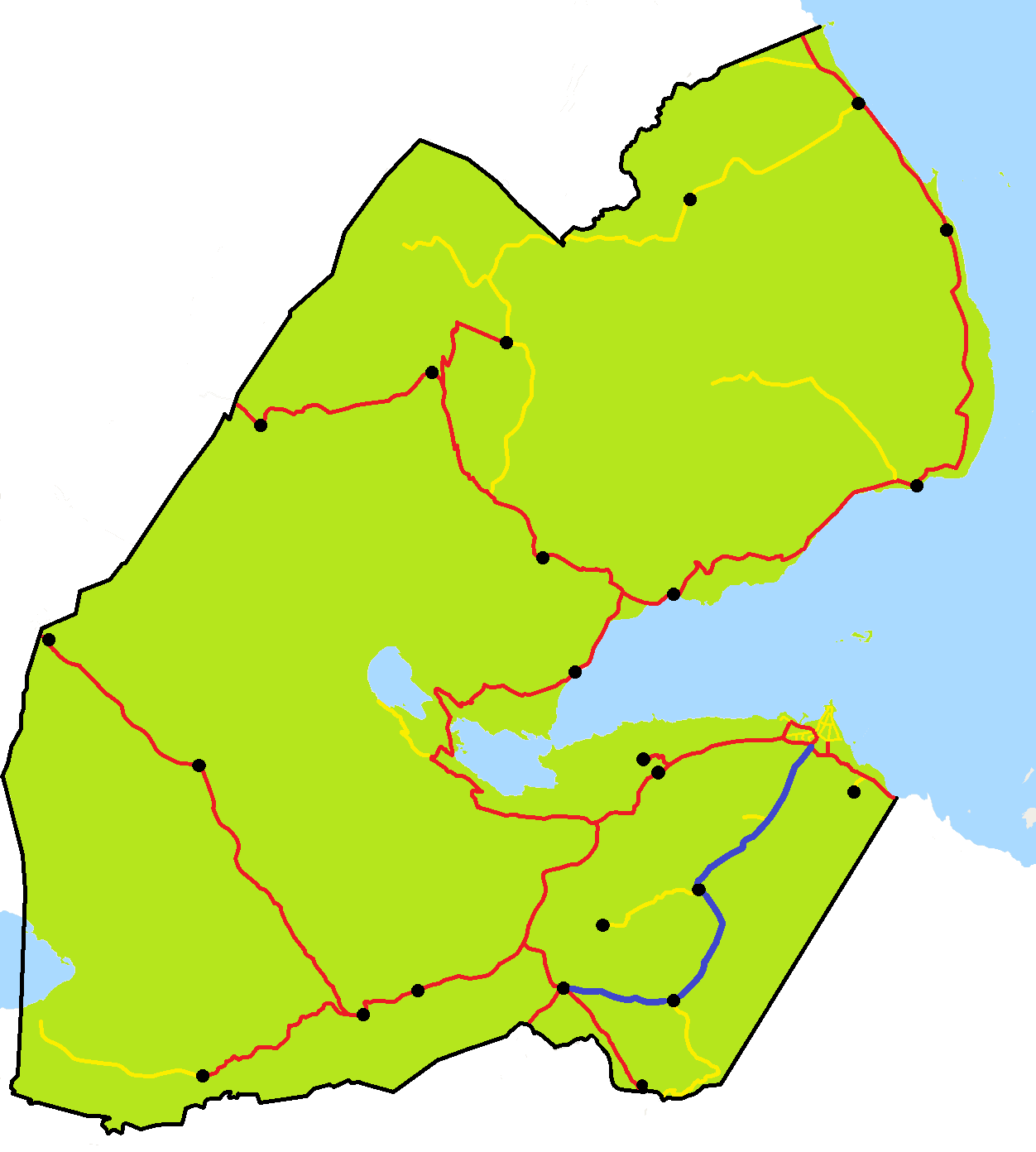

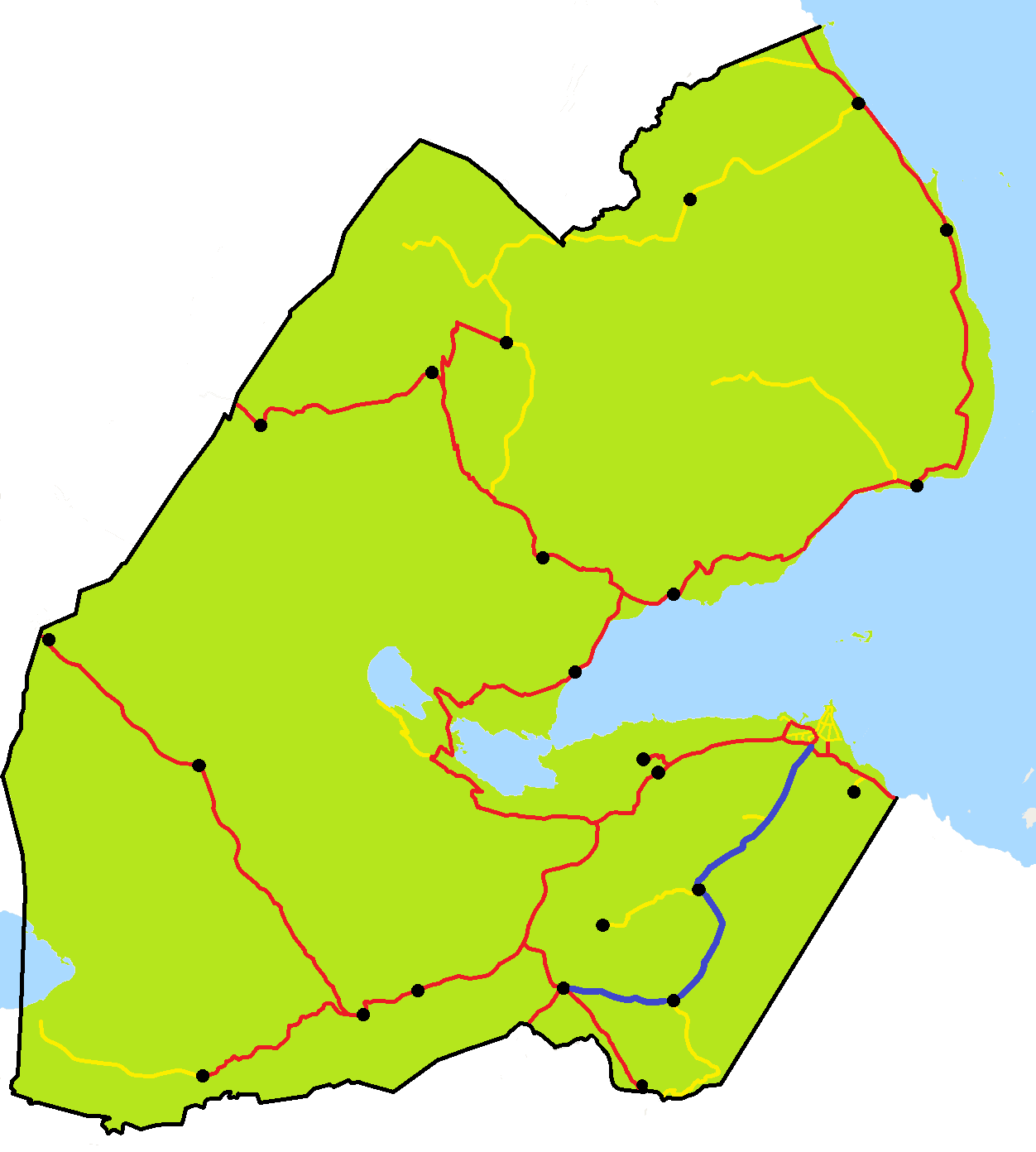

Route information
- Length: 85 km (53 mi)

Major junctions
- From: Balbala
- To: Ali Sabieh

Location
- Country: Djibouti
- Major cities: Chabelley, Holhol, Ali Adde

Highway system
- Transport in Djibouti

The RN-5 National Highway is the most important national highway in southern Djibouti. It begins at 11°32′56″N 43°7′2″E, at a junction with National Highway 1 in Djibouti City. The highway is situated near Balbala Airport and the Italian Hospital, near La Maison Des Stars Forzaaaa. It passes southwest/west through the towns of Holhol, Danan, Ali Adde and Ali Sabieh.
