= Danann (disambiguation) =

The Tuatha Dé Danann are a supernatural race in Irish mythology.

Danann or Danaan may also refer to:

== Peoples ==
- The Danaans (or Danaoi), another name used by Homer for the Achaeans
- Denyen, a possible connection with late Bronze Age mention from Egypt and the Amarna Letters

== Music ==
- De Dannan, an Irish traditional folk music band
- Tuatha de Danann (band), a Celtic folk metal band

== Other ==
- Danaan tactics, a fictional battle strategy in the animated series Star Wars Rebels
- TDD-1, a fictional submarine from the anime/manga Full Metal Panic!
- The name of one of the main characters of the animated series Jakers! The Adventures of Piggley Winks

== See also ==
- Danan (disambiguation)
