= Ghoubet Wind Power Station =

Wind farm in Djibouti

- Country: Djibouti
- Location: Ghoubet, Arta Region, Djibouti
- Coordinates: 11°31′48″N 42°29′47″E
- Status: Operational
- Commission date: 10 September 2023; 18 months ago
- Construction cost: US$122 million (Phase 1)
- Owner: Red Sea Power Limited SAS

Power generation
- Units operational: 17
- Nameplate capacity: 60 MW

The Ghoubet Wind Power Station is a 60 megawatts wind power energy project in the country of Djibouti located in the Horn of Africa. The wind farm is owned and was developed by independent power producers. The power generated is sold to Electricité de Djibouti (EDD) (Electricity of Djibouti), the national electricity utility monopoly, for integration into the national grid. The wind farm is the country's first grid-ready renewable energy power station. The Republic of Djibouti plans to derive all its electricity from renewable sources by 2030.

== Location ==
The wind farm is located in the Arta Region, near the border with the Tadjourah Region, close to Lake Ghoubet, in Djibouti. It sits on an area measuring 395 hectares (1.53 sq mi). This is approximately 1 kilometre (1 mi) west of Lake Ghoubet, close to the junction between highways R9 and R10.

== Overview ==
As of April 2020, Djibouti had installed capacity of 126 megawatts for its population of 940,000, together with their businesses, homes, offices and industries. Most of the installed electricity sources, at that time were expensive fossil-fuel-based.

Ghoubet Wind Farm represents the first of a number of renewable energy sources, as the country diversifies into clean, renewable sources of energy. The project's plan initially comprised 15 wind turbines, each with a maximum rating of 4.8 megawatts, for total capacity of 60 MW. Later, the design was changed to 17 wind turbines, each with rating of 3.465 megawatts, for a total capacity of 58.9 MW.

Other installations that are part of this development include approximately 10 kilometres (6 mi) of access roads, housing for construction workers, administrative offices, an electric substation where each wind turbine sends its power via overhead or underground cables and a 230kV overhead transmission line, measuring 3.5 kilometres (2 mi), to deliver the energy to an EDD substation.

EDD separately constructed a substation in the settlement of Ghoubet, approximately 3.5 kilometres (2 mi) from this power station, where the electricity enters the Djibouti national grid.

== Ownership ==
This power station is owned by a consortium whose members are illustrated in the table below. The members of the consortium formed a special purpose vehicle company called Red Sea Power Limited SAS which constructed, operates and manages the power station.

Ownership of Red Sea Power Limited SAS
Rank	Shareholder	Domicile	Notes
1	Africa Finance Corporation	Nigeria	
2	Construction Equity Fund, FMO	Netherlands	
3	Climate Fund Managers on behalf of Climate Investor One	Netherlands	
4	Great Horn Investment Holdings	Djibouti	

== Construction and timeline ==
The engineering, procurement and construction (EPC) contract was awarded to a consortium comprising the Spanish group Siemens Gamesa Renewable Energy, the world's second largest wind turbine manufacturer and Grupo Auxiliar Metalúrgico S.A., another Spanish company. Construction began in March 2021. The completed wind farm achieved commercial commissioning on 10 September 2023.

== Other considerations ==
The first phase (60 MW) cost US$122 million to build. The owners of the power station plan to expand the capacity by another 45 MW in the second phase of construction.

== See also ==
- List of power stations in Djibouti
