= Chabelley Airport =

- IATA: none; ICAO: HDCH

Summary
- Airport type: Military
- Location: Chabelley, Djibouti
- Elevation AMSL: 106 m (348 ft)
- Coordinates: 11°31′N 43°04′E

Map
- Location of airport in Djibouti

Runways
Direction	Length		Surface
Direction	ft	m	Surface
10/28	8,530	2,600	Asphalt

Chabelley Airport (ICAO: HDCH), also known as the Chabelley Airfield, is a military airstrip in Chabelley, located some 6 miles to the southwest of Djibouti City, the capital of Djibouti.

== Facilities ==
The airport has a single asphalt runway 10/28 that is 8,530 x 95 feet (2,600 x 29 m) long. It features displaced thresholds and runway turnarounds at either end in place of a parallel taxiway. Two small concrete aprons have been constructed to provide parking and maintenance facilities, some of the several additions made by the US military since 2013. Other additions include a perimeter fence, guard towers, and vehicle access gates.

== Military ==
Although it is operated and used by the French military, it began serving as a temporary base for U.S. military unmanned aircraft in September 2013. The move came after the Djiboutian government expressed concern over a number of recent drone mishaps and accidents at the American Camp Lemonnier Naval Expeditionary Base, which serves as a hub for counterterrorism operations in Yemen and Somalia. The Djiboutian authorities consequently asked U.S. officials to relocate the drones to the rarely used Chabelley Airfield. Previously, Chabelley airstrip had been exclusively reserved in case of need for the French military. The U.S. Air Force's 870th Air Expeditionary Squadron operates Predator and Reaper drones from the airfield.
