= Assamo =

Assamo أسامو Ina ‘Assamo
- Town
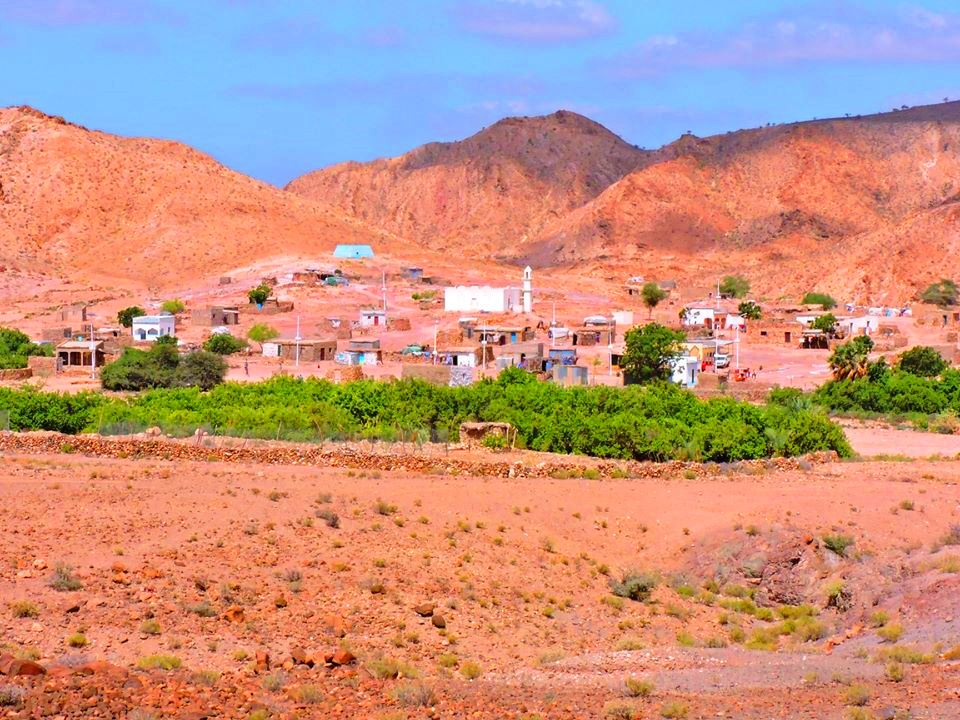

- Location in Djibouti.
- Coordinates: 10°59′00″N 42°50′05″E
- Country: Djibouti
- Region: Ali Sabieh
- Elevation: 757 m (2,484 ft)

Population (2019)
  - Total: 1,211
- Time zone: UTC+3 (EAT)
- Climate: BWh

Assamo (Arabic: أسامو), also known as Ina ‘Assamo, is a village located in Ali Sabieh Region. It is located around 122 kilometres (76 miles) south of the capital, Djibouti City. The surrounding district is rich in both livestock and fledgeling agriculture. Its population, with the nomadic and semi-nomadic neighborhoods is estimated at 1,211 people.

== Overview ==
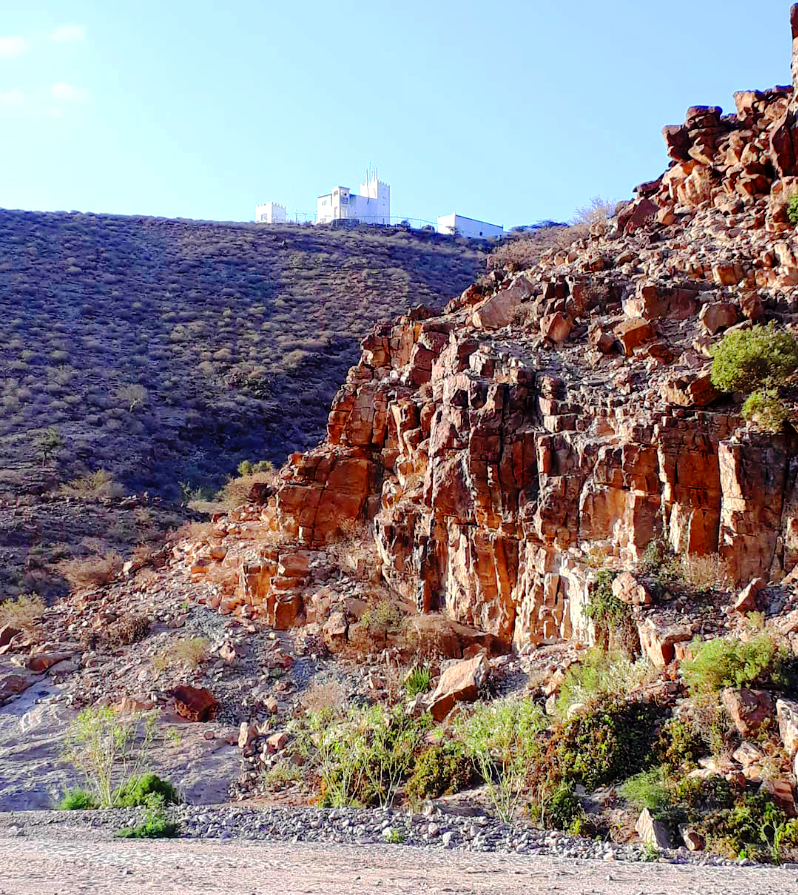
The old French fort overlooking Assamo

The village was originally built on the valley of Guestir, with houses constructed of traditional Aqal. During the Middle Ages, Assamo was ruled by the Ifat Sultanate and Adal Sultanate. In the first half of the 20th century, Assamo formed a part of French Somaliland. The French colonial authorities sent a military detachment to reconnoiter the region, in order to prepare the installation of a fort on the hilltop, intended to secure the borders of French Somaliland. The town is not only growing fast but it is also developing with the scale, and it have been able to provide basic services, such transport, education, health facilities and all that coupled with a fine weather.

Assamo lies along a river, near the border with Ethiopia. Nearby towns and villages include Ali Sabieh (24 km), Ali Adde (19 km) and Guisti (18 km).

== Agriculture ==
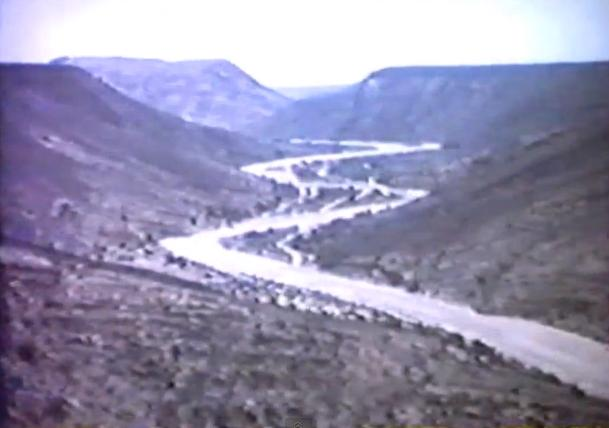
The Assamo Valley in 1967

Assamo is a farm land for Djibouti and it is known for its agricultural, and is where most of Djibouti's crops are produced. The people of Assamo are mainly nomadic herders but have over the years started to settle and practice agro-pastoralists livelihood patterns mainly centered on orchards and irrigated horticulture, which are providing new income opportunities. This is practiced along the Guestir catchment, one of the important seasonal dry streams in the Assamo Landscape, which covers an area of approximately 200 square kilometers. Crops grown in the area include oranges, beans, lemon, potatoes, tomatoes, onions, garlic, watermelon, papaya and many other types of fruits and vegetables.

== Geography ==
Assamo is situated in a mountainous and hilly area. It has green orchards and hills and represents a key focal point for wildlife.

=== Environment ===
Assamo receive additional precipitation in the form of fog and winter rains which sustain isolated forests of Juniperus, Buxus, Acacia, Acacia tortilis, Juniperus procera, etc. Wildlife native to the area include dorcas gazelle, gerenuk, Salt's dik-dik, hamadryas baboon, desert warthog, spotted hyena, striped hyena, black-backed jackal, African golden wolf, honey badger and Somali ostrich.

=== Climate ===
Assamo experiences a hot arid climate (Köppen climate classification BWh), with blazing summers and mild winters. Due to its 757 metres or 2,484 feet altitude, temperatures are relatively mild for a town located not particularly far from deserts. Characterized by hot and dry summers, and mild to cool winters where most of the precipitation is concentrated (spring and autumn being pleasantly warm transitional seasons). However, due to the town's altitude and inland location, its climate features are the very low humidity, and that temperatures usually fall to 24 °C or 75.2 °F at night, which makes summer particularly pleasant compared to coastal cities.

Climate data for Assamo
Month	Jan	Feb	Mar	Apr	May	Jun	Jul	Aug	Sep	Oct	Nov	Dec	Year
Mean daily maximum °C (°F)	24 (75)	25 (77)	26 (79)	27 (81)	31 (88)	36 (97)	36 (97)	35 (95)	33 (91)	27 (81)	25 (77)	24 (75)	29 (84)
Mean daily minimum °C (°F)	16 (61)	17 (63)	18 (64)	20 (68)	22 (72)	26 (79)	25 (77)	25 (77)	24 (75)	20 (68)	17 (63)	16 (61)	21 (69)
Average rainfall mm (inches)	9 (0.4)	10 (0.4)	25 (1.0)	30 (1.2)	10 (0.4)	6 (0.2)	25 (1.0)	45 (1.8)	34 (1.3)	10 (0.4)	13 (0.5)	5 (0.2)	222 (8.8)
Source: The Weather Channel

== Demographics ==
As of 2019, the population of Assamo has been estimated to be 1,211. The city inhabitants belong to various mainly Afro-Asiatic-speaking ethnic groups, with Issa Somali predominant.
