= Damerjog =

Damerjog Dameerjoog
- Village
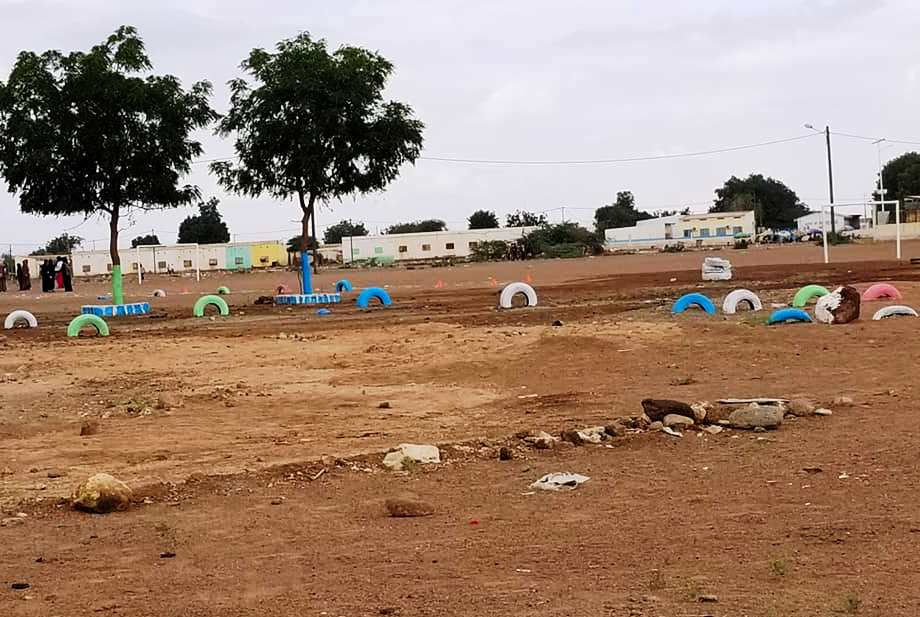

- Location in Djibouti
- Coordinates: 11°29′N 43°11′E
- Country: Djibouti
- Region: Arta Region
- Elevation: 20 m (66 ft)

Population (2024 census)
  - Total: 5,115

Damerjog or Damerdjog (Arabic: داميرجوغ, Somali: Dameerjoog) is a village located in eastern Djibouti, populated by farmers and gardeners, located in the Arta Region, 16 kilometres (9.9 mi) southeast of the capital Djibouti, north of the border with Somaliland.

== History ==
The village was originally built on the plateau near the Damerjog Wadi. A military post was created to help control migration. In the 1970s, traffic was prohibited between Damerjog and the border. Due to insurgents of the Front de Libération de la Côte des Somalis (FLCS) hijacking a bus in 1976.

Today, the village of Damerjog is part of the region of Arta and has more than 3,500 inhabitants listed or not by the government. The village has a primary school and a middle school called "Damerjog college" inaugurated a few years ago. With an ever-increasing number of inhabitants, the village has a health center (Damerjog hospital) from which, in the event of an emergency, patients are transported to the capital. Due to its proximity to the border the village, the army and police prevent drug trafficking, terrorists and terrorist weapons and illegal immigration to enter the Republic of Djibouti.

== Geography ==
Damerjog is situated on a low-lying and round hill with an elevation of 12 metres (39 ft) above sea level. Damerjog is 9 kilometres (5 mi) north of Loyada, 14 kilometres (8 mi) northeast of Ali Oune, 16 kilometres (9 mi) south of Djibouti City (16 km), and 51 kilometres (31 mi) west of Arta. Agriculture in Damerjog depends mainly on water wells, crops grown in the area include oranges, beans, lemon, potatoes, tomatoes, onions, garlic, watermelon, papaya, guava and many other types of fruits and vegetables.

=== Climate ===
Damerjog has a hot and semi-arid (Köppen climate classification BSh). The summer days are quite hot reaching 40 °C (104 °F), yet with moderate nights.

Climate data for Damerjog
Month	Jan	Feb	Mar	Apr	May	Jun	Jul	Aug	Sep	Oct	Nov	Dec	Year
Mean daily maximum °C (°F)	28.2 (82.8)	28.9 (84.0)	30.4 (86.7)	32.3 (90.1)	34.9 (94.8)	38.7 (101.7)	39.9 (103.8)	38.9 (102.0)	36.9 (98.4)	33.2 (91.8)	30.9 (87.6)	28.5 (83.3)	33.5 (92.3)
Mean daily minimum °C (°F)	20.0 (68.0)	23.4 (74.1)	24.5 (76.1)	25.9 (78.6)	27.7 (81.9)	30.5 (86.9)	31.0 (87.8)	29.9 (85.8)	29.5 (85.1)	26.2 (79.2)	24.3 (75.7)	21.0 (69.8)	26.2 (79.1)
Average rainfall mm (inches)	12.0 (0.47)	18.8 (0.74)	20.3 (0.80)	29.9 (1.18)	16.7 (0.66)	3.1 (0.12)	6.2 (0.24)	5.6 (0.22)	6.1 (0.24)	21.2 (0.83)	22.4 (0.88)	11.2 (0.44)	173.5 (6.82)
Source: Climate-Data.org, altitude: 20m

== Demographics ==
As of the 2024 census, the population of Damerjog was at 5,115. The town inhabitants belong to various mainly Afro-Asiatic-speaking ethnic groups, with the Issa Somali predominant.
