= Kadra Ahmed Hassan =

Djiboutian diplomat

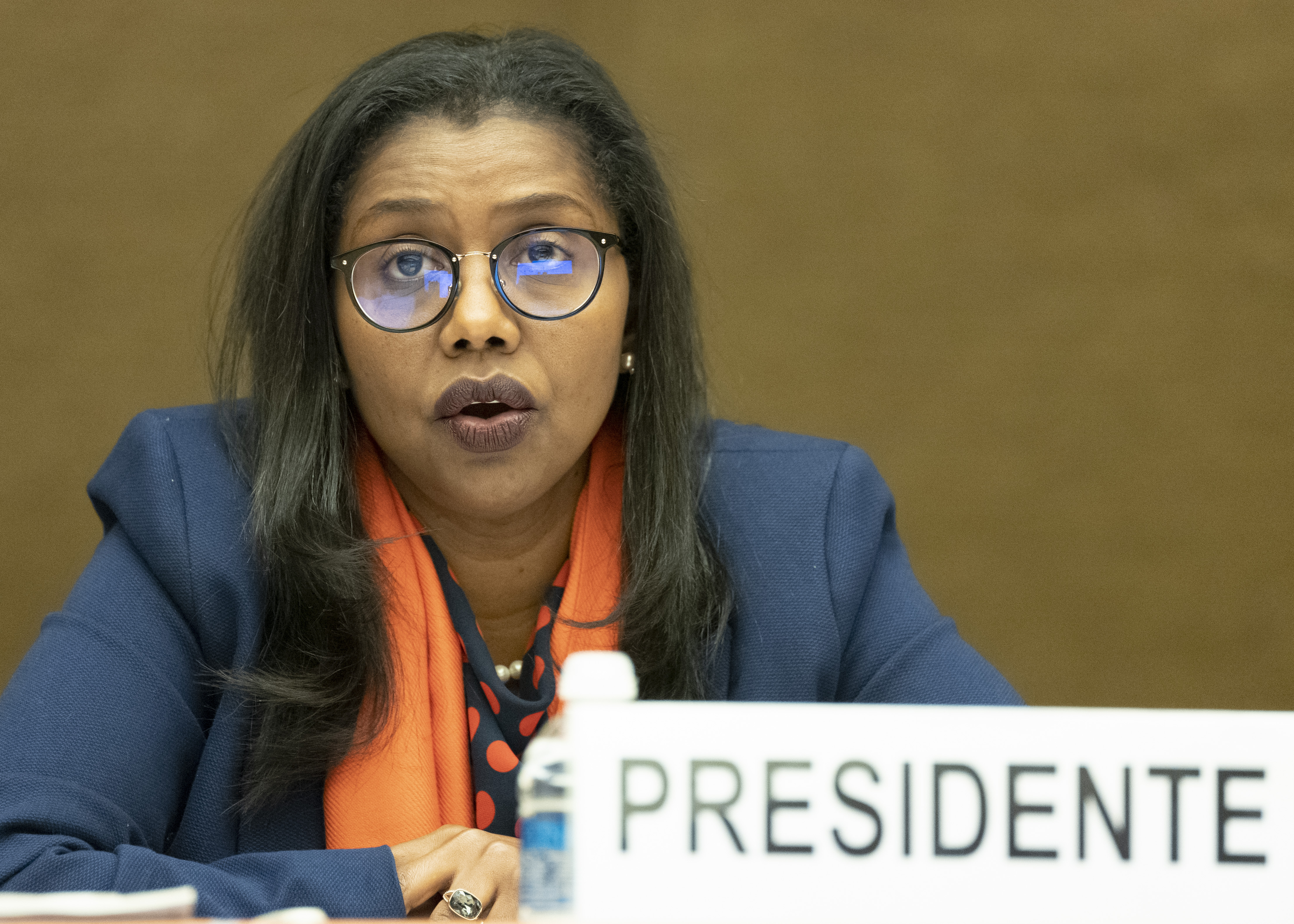
- in 2019
- Born: April 28, 1973 (age 52); Ali Sabieh
- Occupation: Diplomat
- Known for: Permanent Representative to the United Nations and the World Trade Organization

Kadra Ahmed Hassan (Somali: Khadra Axmed Xuseen) is Djibouti's Permanent Representative to the United Nations and the World Trade Organization.

== Life ==
Hassan was born in Ali Sabieh in Djibouti 1973. She holds master's degrees in political science from several universities including Jean Moulin university Lyon III and Montesquieu University. Her first language is Somali but she also speaks French, English and Arabic.

In 2007 she became Djibouti's chargé d'affaires to the United Nations and from 2013 to 2015 she was elected to the board of UN Women.

Hassan was promoted to be Republic of Djibouti's Ambassador Extraordinary and Plenipotentiary to the Swiss Confederation in September 2016. She was already the Permanent Representative to the United Nations and the World Trade Organization. A previous holder was Roble Olhaye who died in 2015 and Hassan paid tribute to his 27 years of service at the UN in 2015. Her responsibilities included other agencies in Geneva and the Swiss Confederation was now formally included.

In 2019 Hassan took on the chair of the Social Forum of the United Nations Human Rights Council in Geneva. In 2020, during the COVID-19 pandemic, she thanked the United Nations High Commissioner for Refugees for their help. Djibouti were accepting the children of refugees into their school, but Climate change and the pandemic were putting high demands on a poor country. She is also the Chair of the Ad Hoc Committee on the Elaboration of Complementary Standards to the International Convention on the Elimination of All Forms of Racial Discrimination, which is expected “to elaborate, as a matter of priority and necessity, complementary standards in the form of either a convention or additional protocol(s) to the International Convention on the Elimination of All Forms of Racial Discrimination, filling the existing gaps in the Convention and also providing new normative standards aimed at combating all forms of contemporary racism, including incitement to racial and religious hatred.”
