= Holhol Defence Training Center =

Military training base in Djibouti

Coordinates: 11°18′22″N 42°55′23″E

El-Hajj Hassan Gouled Military Academy
- Holhol, Djibouti
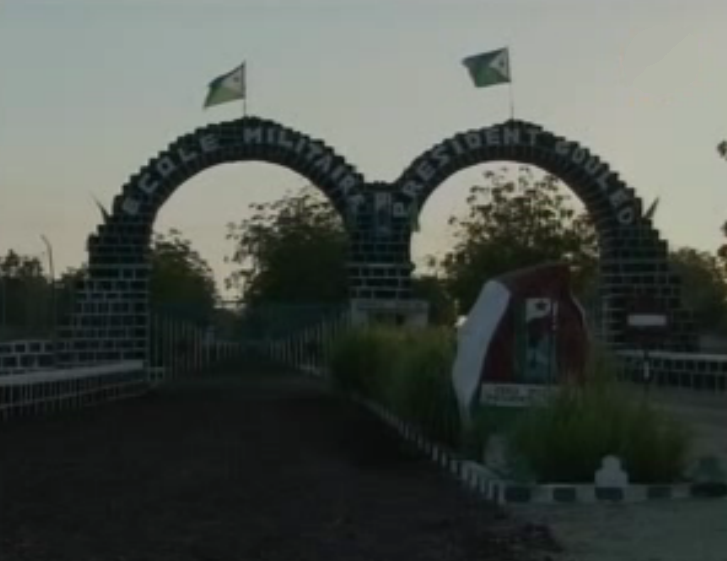
- Entrance to El-Hajj Hassan Gouled

Site information
- Type: Military Academy Center - Military Training Facility
- Controlled by: Djibouti Armed Forces

Site history
- In use: 1977–present

The Holhol or El-Hajj Hassan Gouled is a basic military training centre for the Djibouti Armed Forces and is located in Holhol south of the country. El-Hajj Hassan Gouled Military Training Center is one of the biggest basic infantry centers in Djibouti. A major focus of the development of the Djibouti Armed Forces is on raising the levels of training among the troops.

The site also houses a clinic that treats the trainees, their family members and the local community. It has received numerous donations of medical supplies from the US military.

== Military training ==
All officer cadets are commissioned as second lieutenants in the Djiboutian National Army in one of its branch schools. Currently the emphasis is on training the DJNA instructors so that they will be able to continue training other recruits in the future. It is in the middle of the Sub-Saharan desert with temperatures reaching 47 degrees Celsius during summer.

The current list of schools is Armor, Artillery, Human Resources, Signal, Infantry, Legal, Military Police, and Intelligence.

The site also provides basic training to new entrants and advanced training to non-commissioned officers for the Djibouti military.
