= Danan (Amran) =

Danan دنان
- Sub-district
- Location in Yemen
- Country: Yemen
- Governorate: 'Amran Governorate
- District: Al Ashah District

Population (2004)
  - Total: 3,190
- Time zone: UTC+3

Danan (Arabic: دنان) is a sub-district located in Al Ashah District, 'Amran Governorate, Yemen. Danan had a population of 3,190 according to the 2004 census.
