= List of power stations in Djibouti =

The following page lists power stations in Djibouti.

== Wind ==
Station	Location	Capacity (MW)	Commissioned	Notes
Ghoubet Wind Power Station	11°31′48″N 42°29′47″E	60.0	2022 (expected)	

== Solar ==
Station	Location	Capacity (MW)	Commissioned	Notes
Amea Grand Bara Solar Power Station	11°07′23″N 42°41′20″E	25.0	2024 (expected)	

== See also ==
- Energy in Djibouti
- List of power stations in Africa
- List of largest power stations in the world
