= Goubetto =

Goubetto Gubato
- Town
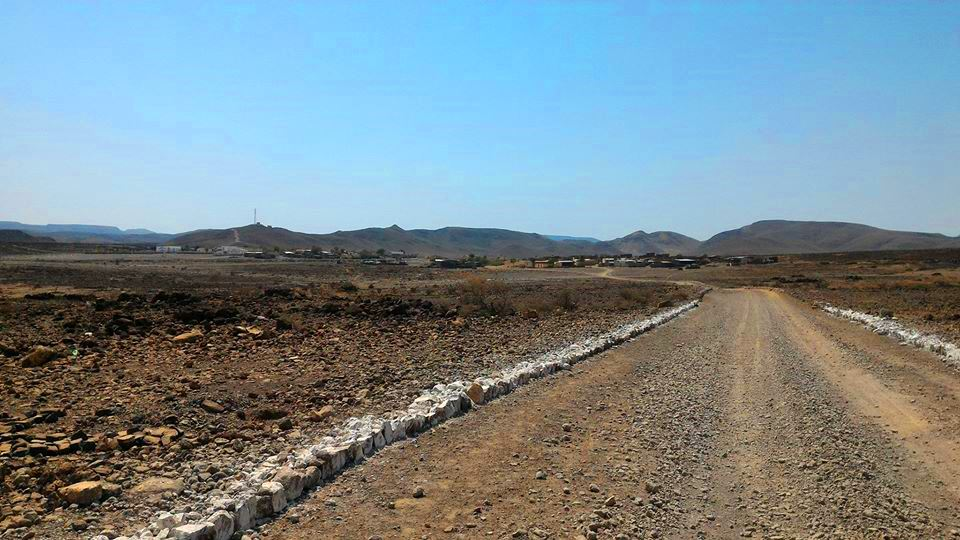

- Location in Djibouti
- Coordinates: 11°25′18″N 42°59′57″E
- Country: Djibouti
- Region: Ali Sabieh
- Elevation: 346 m (1,135 ft)

Population
  - Total: 1,400

Goubetto (Arabic: جوبيتو, Somali: Gubato), also spelled Goubétto, is a town in Djibouti. Located in the Ali Sabieh region, it is served by a station on the Ethio-Djibouti Railways. The eastern part of the same plateau is crossed by numerous valleys and dry watercourses. Goat and camel raising form the basis of the economy.

== Overview ==
Goubetto is served by a station on the meter gauge Ethio-Djibouti Railway. A notable feature of the meter-gauge railway is a viaduct, that was built in 1900. Nearby towns and villages include Chabelley (15 km), Holhol (18 km), Djibouti City (26 km) and Arta (21 km).

== Demographics ==
As of 2015, the population of Goubetto has been estimated to be 1,400. The town inhabitants belong to various mainly Afro-Asiatic-speaking ethnic groups, with the Gadabursi and Issa Somali predominant.

== Climate ==
Goubetto has a hot arid climate (BWh) by the Köppen-Geiger system.

Climate data for Goubetto
| Month | Jan | Feb | Mar | Apr | May | Jun | Jul | Aug | Sep | Oct | Nov | Dec | Year |
|---|---|---|---|---|---|---|---|---|---|---|---|---|---|
| Mean daily maximum °C (°F) | 27 (81) | 28 (82) | 29 (84) | 30 (86) | 33 (91) | 39 (102) | 39 (102) | 38 (100) | 36 (97) | 30 (86) | 28 (82) | 27 (81) | 32 (90) |
| Mean daily minimum °C (°F) | 19 (66) | 20 (68) | 21 (70) | 22 (72) | 26 (79) | 28 (82) | 27 (81) | 27 (81) | 26 (79) | 25 (77) | 22 (72) | 19 (66) | 24 (74) |
| Average rainfall mm (inches) | 12 (0.5) | 20 (0.8) | 25 (1.0) | 30 (1.2) | 9 (0.4) | 4 (0.2) | 6 (0.2) | 21 (0.8) | 12 (0.5) | 13 (0.5) | 35 (1.4) | 12 (0.5) | 199 (8) |
Source: Climate-Data.org

== See also ==
- Railway stations in Djibouti
