= Lycée Français de Djibouti =

Secondary school in Djibouti

Coordinates: 11°34′00″N 43°09′06″E

Information
- School type: International School
- Established: 1978 (École Française Françoise Dolto); 1991 (Lycée Français Joseph Kessel); 2007 (Lycée Français de Djibouti)
- Staff: 180
- Teaching staff: 100
- Age: 3 to 18
- Enrollment: c.1400
- Language: French
- Website: https://lfdjibouti.org/

Lycée Français de Djibouti (LFD) is a French international school with two campuses in Djibouti, the Dolto and Kessel campuses. It was founded when the École Française Françoise Dolto and the Lycée Français Joseph Kessel, respectively founded in 1978 and 1991, merged on 27 April 2007. The school serves up to the lycée (senior high school) level.
