= Ali Adde =

Ali Adde Cali Cadde أدى على
- Town
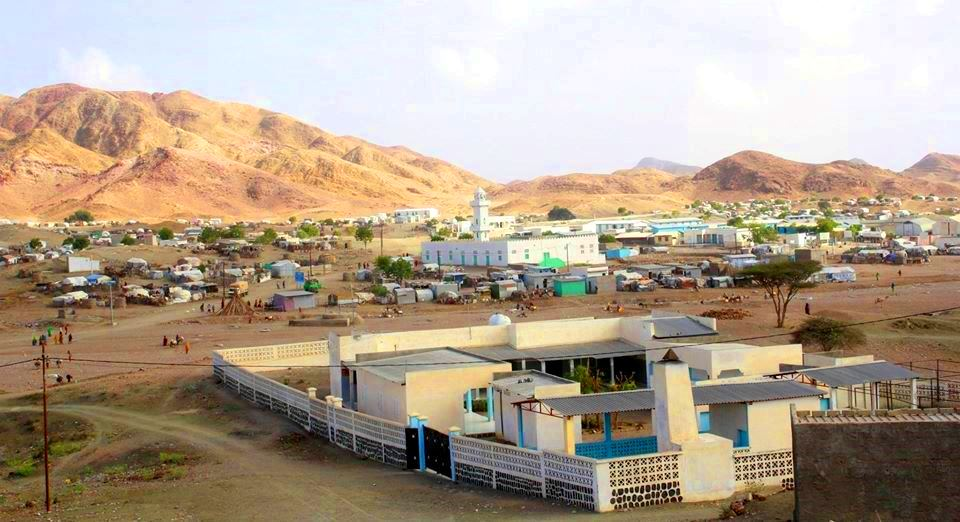

- Location in Djibouti.
- Coordinates: 11°07′50″N 42°53′36″E
- Country: Djibouti
- Region: Ali Sabieh
- Established: 13th century
- Elevation: 530 m (1,740 ft)

Population (2018)
  - Total: 3,700
- Time zone: UTC+3 (EAT)
- Climate: BSh

Ali Adde (Somali: Cali Cadde, Arabic: أدى على) is a town in Djibouti. It is located some 69 kilometers south of the capital, Djibouti City, with an elevation of 530 meters above sea level. It is the site of a UNHCR base hosting 12,363 refugees as of 2015. It sprawls on a wide basin surrounded by granitic mountains on some sides. The center is run by the UNHCR, and its operations are financed by foreign donors.

== History ==
The Ali Adde settlement dates back several centuries, and is one of the oldest towns in Djibouti after Tadjoura and Obock. Its place-name literally means "the white or clear place" in the Afro-Asiatic Somali language.

According to an old legend, the present-day territory of Ali Adde was covered by trees, with a wadi crossing the area. Originally a small settlement, the town grew under the reign of the Ifat Sultanate and Adal Sultanate. It later formed a part of the French Somaliland protectorate in the first half of the 20th century. In December 1942, about 1,000 British and French Free troops occupied the town. Ali Adde has an old fort near the Wadi Danan, which was built by the French Army in the 19th century.

== Overview ==
The town lies on the National Highway 5.

Ali Adde is 23 kilometres (14 mi) east of Ali Sabieh, 25 kilometres (15 mi) south of Holhol, 21 kilometres (13 mi) north of Assamo, and 70 kilometres (43 mi) southwest of Djibouti City.

== Geography ==
Ali Adde is located in a valley in the southern section of the country. The city is situated in a mountainous area, in an enclosed valley of the highlands. It sits at an elevation of 530 meter (1,740 ft) above sea level. One can also take in the local wildlife attracted by the relatively abundant rainfall. Among these are the black-backed jackal, dorcas gazelle, Felis, caracal, birds and the hamadryas baboon.

=== Climate ===
Ali Adde sits at an altitude of 530 metres or 1,740 feet above sea level, in low-shrouded mountains and hills. Its weather is characterized by sweltering and dry summers and pleasant to very warm winters, when most of the precipitation is concentrated (spring and autumn being hot transitional seasons). However, due to the town's altitude and inland location, its climatic features include very low humidity, and temperatures usually falling below 26 °C (78.8 °F) at night, which makes summer distinctly less unpleasant compared to coastal cities. Due to its 530 metres or 1,740 feet altitude, temperatures are relatively normal for a town located not particularly far from the hottest deserts in the world. The town is known for its normal climate during the summer periods. Between May and early September, the annual high temperature is a high of 38.0 °C or 100.4 °F and a low of 26.5 °C or 79.7 °F.

Ali Adde has a hot arid climate (BWh) by the Köppen-Geiger system.

Climate data for Ali Adde
Month	Jan	Feb	Mar	Apr	May	Jun	Jul	Aug	Sep	Oct	Nov	Dec	Year
Mean daily maximum °C (°F)	25.1 (77.2)	25.8 (78.4)	26.3 (79.3)	29.5 (85.1)	33.4 (92.1)	37.9 (100.2)	37.5 (99.5)	36.8 (98.2)	35.0 (95.0)	30.0 (86.0)	26.9 (80.4)	25.8 (78.4)	30.8 (87.5)
Mean daily minimum °C (°F)	18.0 (64.4)	18.8 (65.8)	20.2 (68.4)	21.1 (70.0)	25.0 (77.0)	27.1 (80.8)	26.9 (80.4)	25.8 (78.4)	25.2 (77.4)	22.9 (73.2)	20.1 (68.2)	18.8 (65.8)	22.5 (72.5)
Average rainfall mm (inches)	15 (0.6)	10 (0.4)	15 (0.6)	26 (1.0)	6 (0.2)	6 (0.2)	25 (1.0)	40 (1.6)	30 (1.2)	19 (0.7)	10 (0.4)	11 (0.4)	213 (8.3)
Source: The Weather Channel

== Demographics ==
As of 2018, the population of Ali Adde has been estimated to be 3,400. The town inhabitants belong to various mainly Afro-Asiatic-speaking ethnic groups, with the Gadabursi and Issa Somali predominant. Before the UNHCR camp was opened, the local town population traditionally consisted of nomadic pastoralists, who were mainly camel and goat herders. However, since the 1990s, an influx of refugees has dramatically shifted the demographics of the area.
