= Holhol =

Holhol Hollholl (Somali) حلحول (Arabic)
- Town
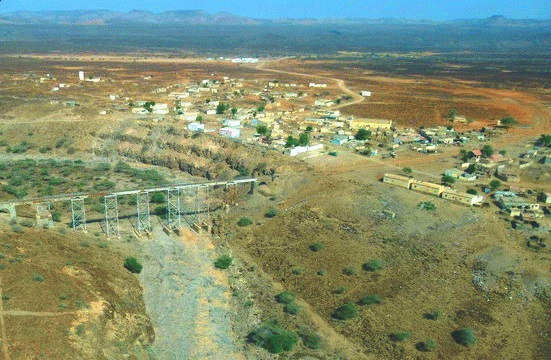

- Location in Djibouti
- Coordinates: 11°18′35″N 42°55′45″E
- Country: Djibouti
- Region: Ali Sabieh

Area
  - Total: 2 km^{2} (0.77 sq mi)
- Elevation: 450 m (1,480 ft)

Population (2024 census)
  - Total: 3,875
- Climate: BWh

Holhol (Somali: Hollholl, Arabic: حلحول) is a town in the Ali Sabieh Region of Djibouti. It is located 44 kilometres (27 miles) south-west of the capital Djibouti City, at an altitude of 450 metres (1,476 feet) above sea level. The surrounding area is rich in livestock and fledgling agriculture. It is notable for being the birthplace of Cheik Osman Waiss a nationalist and anti-colonial where he began his movement.

== History ==
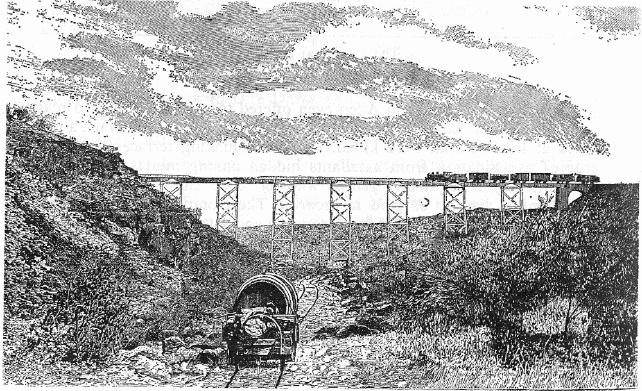
The old railroad bridge in Holhol.

The Holhol area has been inhabited since ancient times with nomadics sometimes stopping here for water on the way to the town of Zeila and Harar across the Horn of Africa. and after the signing treaties in 1894 with the then ruling Ugaas of Issa Somali, to established a protectorate in the region referred to as French Somaliland. The railway reached this location on 14 July 1899. Holhol became an administrative and commercial centre in the 1900s after the construction of the Ethio-Djibouti Railway between Djibouti City and Addis Ababa, undermined the traditional camel caravan economy of Holhol. It was first railway in French Somaliland.

== Overview ==
Holhol is served by a station on the meter gauge Ethio-Djibouti Railway. A notable feature of the meter-gauge railway is a viaduct, 29 meters high and 45 meters long, that was built in 1900. The station is a transit point for commercial goods from Ethiopia. Holhol also has a station on the new standard gauge Addis Ababa–Djibouti Railway.

The town also lies along RN-5 National Highway. It is the seventh largest city in the country.

Additionally, Holhol has a number of primary and secondary schools as well as nurseries. The El-Hajj Hassan Gouled Military Academy is located here. One kilometer from the town is the local college. Nearby towns and villages include Ali Sabieh (33 km), Goubetto (18 km), Ali Adde (23 km), Dasbiyo (19 km) and Chabelley (28 km).

== Demographics ==
As of 2017, the population of Holhol has been estimated to be roughly around 3,000. The city inhabitants belong to various mainly Afro-Asiatic-speaking ethnic groups, with the Gadabursi and Issa Somali predominant.

== Geography ==
Holhol is situated on a spur of a plateau, an upland characterized by two major wadis which run beside it. Holhol is located between the Guban Desert on the east and the Gagegando Mountains on the west. Much of the landscape is rocky and arid, with desert vegetation and wildlife.

=== Ecology ===
Most of the regional flora consists of African olive tree, Acacia tortilis with an added mixture of Buxus hildebrandtii, Tarchonanthus camphoratus, Terminalia brownie and the Flat top acacia, the mesquite tree, an invasive species from Central America, has become established. Native fauna includes the Soemmerring's gazelle, Hamadryas baboon, Salt's dik-dik, Beira, African spurred tortoise, several species of Somali elephant shrew and Yellow-spotted rock hyrax, Somali ostrich, Black-backed jackal. Hyena may be observed on occasion, on the fringes of settled areas. In August 2023, the once-common Cheetah was finally witnessed in the Holhol area for the first time in over more than 30 years. Other issues faces are soil erosion and overgrazing. All of these environmental issues produce soil degradation.

=== Climate ===
Holhol is located in the central Ali Sabieh Region, and has a hot arid climate (BWh) under the Köppen-Geiger system, characterised by hot to sweltering, dry summers and mild winters with limited rainfall.

Average high temperatures are between 34 °C (93 °F) and 38 °C (100 °F) during summer months, and it can sometimes rise up to 41 °C (106 °F) during heat waves, and it can occasionally drop to below 27 °C (81 °F) at night. However, with low humidity and moderate temperatures at night, the climate is quite pleasant. Winter usually sets in around the end of November, extending through early to mid-March. During the winter months, average low temperatures are between 18 °C (64 °F) and 19 °C (66 °F), and it can occasionally drop to below 16 °C (61 °F). The average annual limited rainfall in Holhol is around 198 millimetres or 7.8 inches

Climate data for Holhol
Month	Jan	Feb	Mar	Apr	May	Jun	Jul	Aug	Sep	Oct	Nov	Dec	Year
Mean daily maximum °C (°F)	25.0 (77.0)	25.8 (78.4)	26.5 (79.7)	29.0 (84.2)	33.5 (92.3)	38.6 (101.5)	38.5 (101.3)	37.0 (98.6)	35.3 (95.5)	30.0 (86.0)	27.0 (80.6)	25.9 (78.6)	31.0 (87.8)
Mean daily minimum °C (°F)	18.9 (66.0)	19.3 (66.7)	21.5 (70.7)	22.4 (72.3)	25.3 (77.5)	27.4 (81.3)	27.1 (80.8)	26.2 (79.2)	23.5 (74.3)	23.2 (73.8)	20.6 (69.1)	19.0 (66.2)	22.9 (73.2)
Average rainfall mm (inches)	5 (0.2)	9 (0.4)	25 (1.0)	37 (1.5)	14 (0.6)	7 (0.3)	11 (0.4)	35 (1.4)	29 (1.1)	13 (0.5)	7 (0.3)	6 (0.2)	198 (7.9)
Source: Climate-Data.org, altitude: 450 metres or 1,480 feet

== See also ==
- Railway stations in Ethiopia
- List of reduplicated place names
