= Ali Sabieh =

Ali Sabieh Cali Sabiix علي صبيح
- City
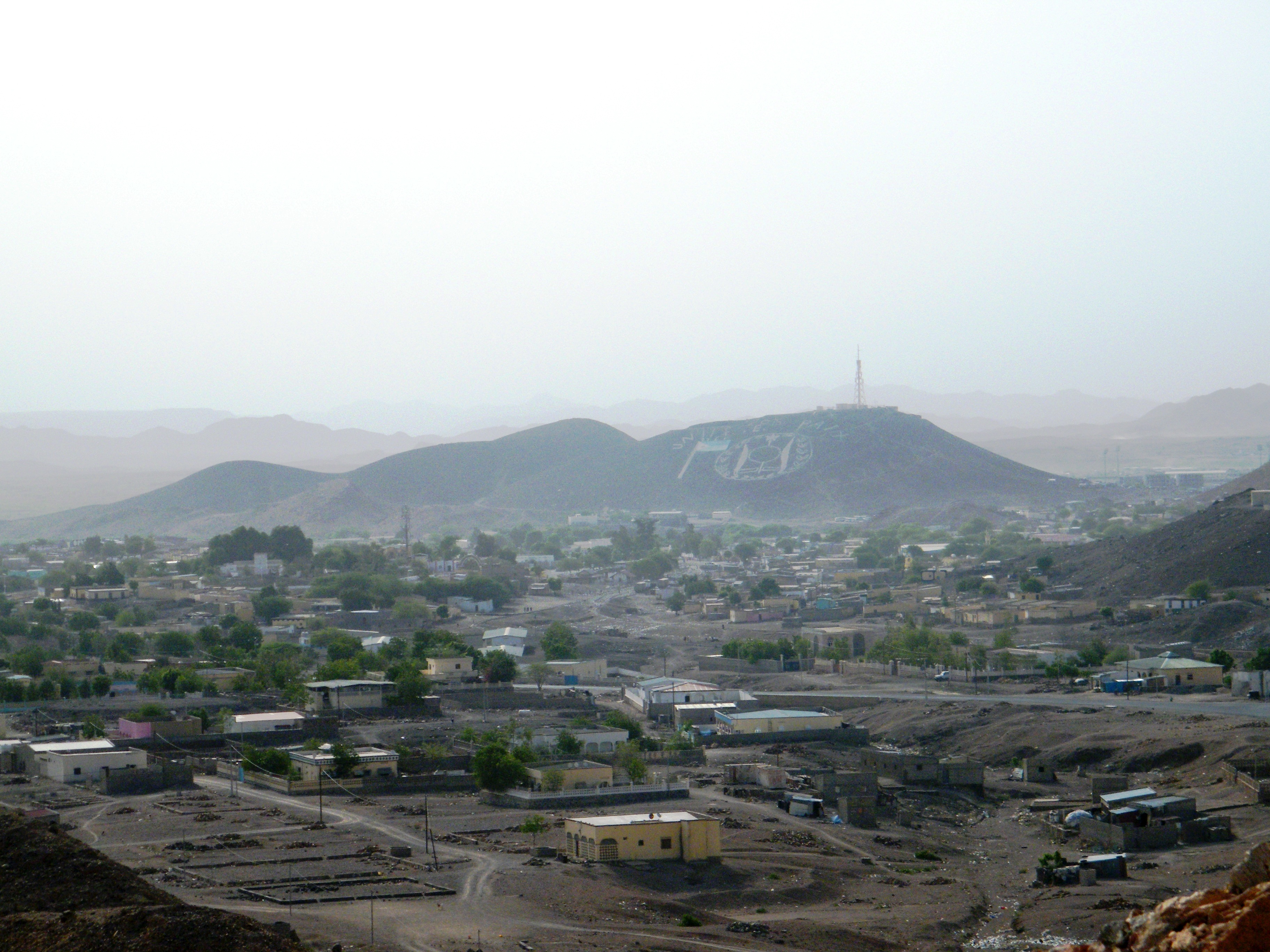
- Nickname: Assajog
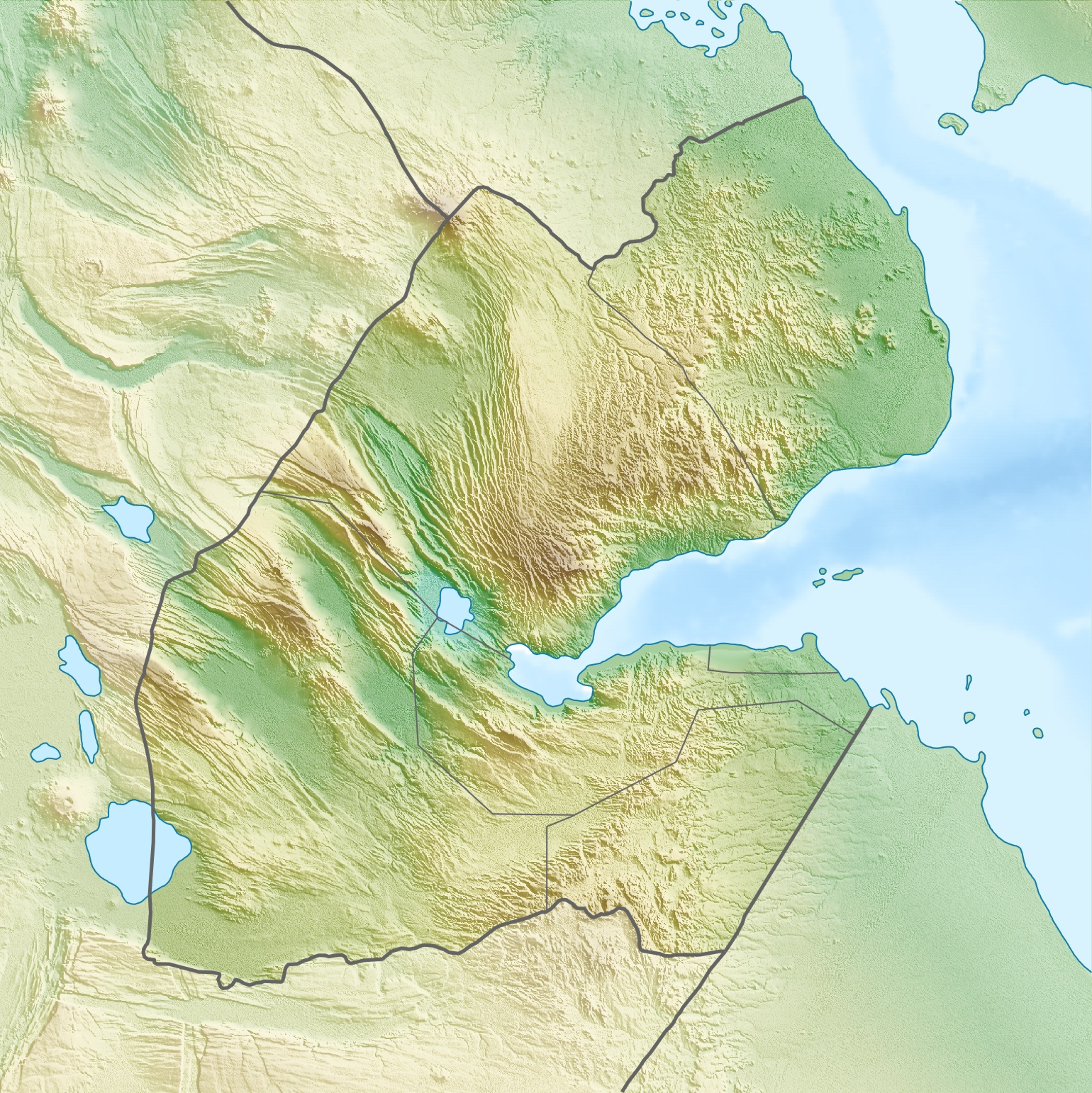
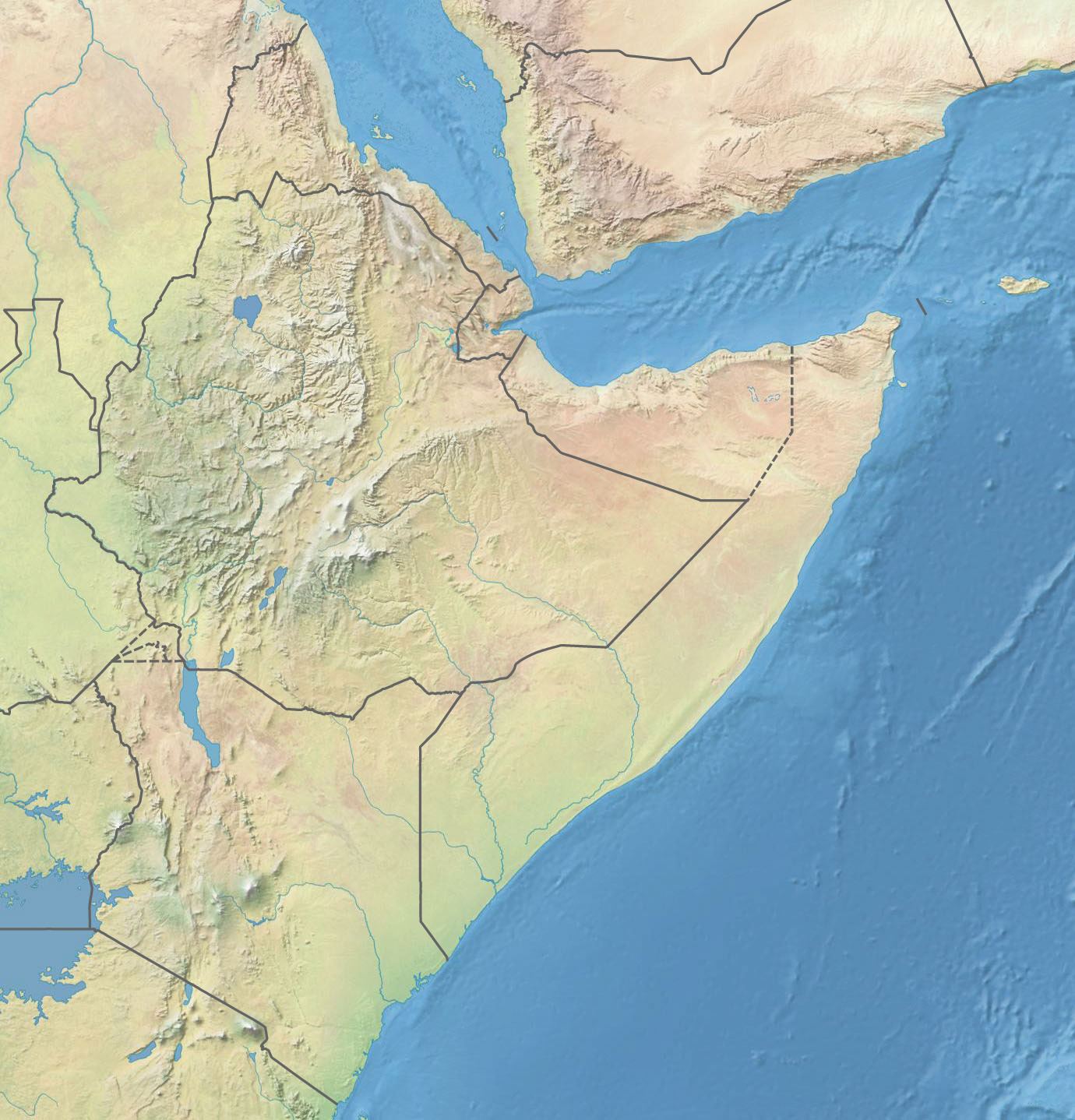
- Location within Djibouti Location within the Horn of Africa Location within Africa
- Coordinates: 11°09′N 42°43′E
- Country: Djibouti
- Region: Ali Sabieh

Area
  - Total: 16 km^{2} (6.2 sq mi)
- Elevation: 756 m (2,480 ft)

Population (2024 census)
  - Total: 44,782
  - Density: 2,800/km^{2} (7,200/sq mi)
- Time zone: UTC+3 (EAT)
- Climate: BSh

Ali Sabieh (Somali: Cali Sabiix, Arabic: علي صبيح) is the second-largest city in Djibouti and the capital of the Ali Sabieh Region. It is situated about 98 kilometres (61 miles) southwest of Djibouti City, 10 km (6 mi) north of the border with Ethiopia, and along National Highway 5.

Ali Sabieh's central location has contributed to its economic revival, as goods travelling to other parts of Djibouti all depart from the city's outskirts. It also has a mild climate makes it a popular tourist destination for Djiboutians. It sprawls on a wide basin surrounded by granitic mountains on all sides. The landmark of Ali Sabieh mountain is located near the city.

Nearby towns and villages include Dikhil (50 km), Arta (69 km), Ali Adde (22 km), Assamo (24 km), Dewele (18 km), Dasbiyo (15 km), Holhol (33 km), and Guelile (10 km).

== History ==
Ali Sabieh was a small village when the French created their French Somaliland.

When the construction of the Ethio-Djibouti Railways reached Ali Sabieh on 14 July 1900, the town became an administrative and commercial centre. During this time, Ali Sabieh profited from the railroad more than any other town and became a "boom city," attracting most of the trade. In 1904, a report notes that "when the border post of Ali Sabieh, it has the appearance of a fortress." Ali Sabieh became attached to the Circle of Gobaad-Dikhil in 1931 and an autonomous circle in 1939.

During World War II, troops from the Harar Governorate under General Guglielmo Nasi attacked the fort of Ali-Sabieh multiple times between 1 and 10 July. There was also some skirmishing over the Ethio-Djibouti Railways. On 10 July, when the government learned that the armistice was not yet put into effect in French Somaliland, President Philippe Pétain, a collaborationist government at Vichy, sent General Gaëtan Germain as his personal representative to correct the situation. Negotiations at Dewele, Italian East Africa, on the local implementation of the armistice were finally completed on 8 August. With the Italian invasion of British Somaliland, Italians completely surrounded the territory.

The Commander-in-Chief, East Africa, William Platt, codenamed the negotiations for the surrender of French Somaliland "Pentagon", named as such because there were five sides: himself, the Vichy governor, the Free French, the British minister at Addis Ababa, and the United States. Christian Raimond Dupont surrendered and Colonel Raynal's troops crossed back into French Somaliland on 26 December 1942, completing its liberation. The official handover took place at 10:00 p.m. on 28 December. The first governor appointed under the Free French was André Bayardelle. Ali Sabieh was briefly attached to the Circle of Djibouti from 1946 to 1949, then again to the Circle of Gobaad-Dikhil from 1952 to 1958, before it regained its own administration in 1958. In 1967, it was transformed into districts.

== Geography ==
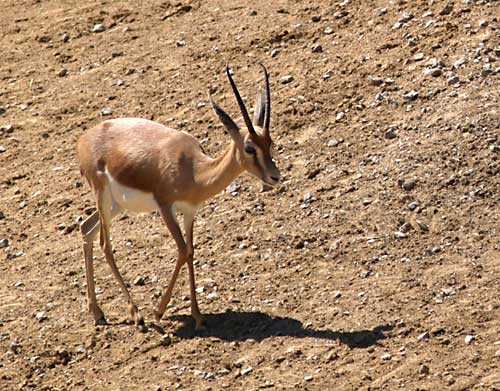
The dorcas gazelle

Ali Sabieh is located in a valley in the southern section of the country. The city is situated in a mountainous area in an enclosed valley of the highlands. It sits at an elevation of 756 metres (2,480 feet) above sea level. The city's layout is partially scattered and irregular. Houses are generally single story and mostly made with cement. To the east of Ali Sabieh is a grassland savannah, which attracts many types of wildlife to the area, including black-backed jackal, dorcas gazelle, Felis, caracal, various bird species, and the hamadryas baboon.

== Climate ==
Ali Sabieh is characterized by a hot semi-arid climate (Köppen climate classification BSh), with long, hot, dry summers and mild winters. Ali Sabieh's climate is largely defined by its geographic location, as its altitude gives the settlement and the surrounding area a milder climate than the Djibouti City coastal area.

The summer season in Ali Sabieh is moderately long, characterized by hot and dry breezes with little rain and generally low relative humidity. Average high temperatures are between 32 °C (90 °F) and 37 °C (99 °F) during summer months, with lows of 19 °C (66 °F) at night. Winter begins around the end of November, extending through early to mid-March. During the winter months, average low temperatures are between 15 °C (59 °F) and 16 °C (61 °F), occasionally dropping below 12 °C (54 °F). There are two rainy seasons. The first rainy season extends from March to April, and the second from July to September. The average annual rainfall in Ali Sabieh is around 205 mm (8 in).

The highest recorded temperature was 40 °C or 104 °F on July 13, 2008, while the lowest recorded temperature was 12.5 °C or 54.5 °F on December 10, 1992.

Climate data for Ali Sabieh
Month	Jan	Feb	Mar	Apr	May	Jun	Jul	Aug	Sep	Oct	Nov	Dec	Year
Mean daily maximum °C (°F)	23 (73)	24 (75)	25 (77)	27 (81)	31 (88)	37 (99)	36 (97)	36 (97)	34 (93)	28 (82)	25 (77)	24 (75)	29 (85)
Mean daily minimum °C (°F)	16 (61)	17 (63)	18 (64)	20 (68)	23 (73)	26 (79)	25 (77)	25 (77)	24 (75)	20 (68)	18 (64)	16 (61)	21 (69)
Average rainfall mm (inches)	17 (0.7)	14 (0.6)	16 (0.6)	25 (1.0)	5 (0.2)	2 (0.1)	19 (0.7)	43 (1.7)	34 (1.3)	10 (0.4)	13 (0.5)	7 (0.3)	205 (8.1)
Source 1: Climate-Data.org, altitude: 756 metres or 2,480 feet
Source 2: Levoyageur

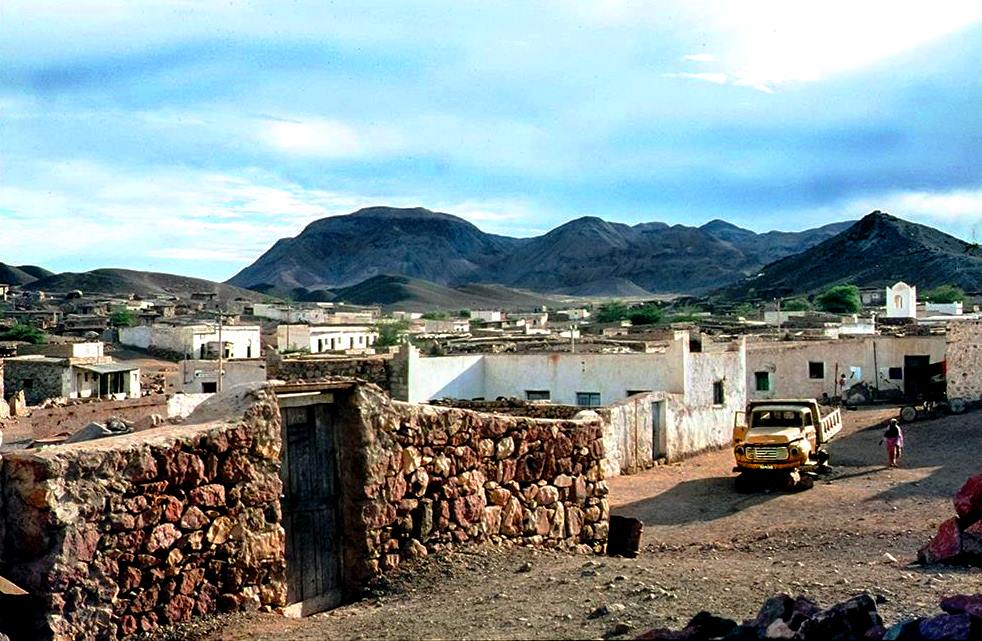
Ali Sabieh in 1970

== Demographics ==
As of the 2024 population census conducted by the Djiboutian national statistics authorities, Ali Sabieh has a total population of 44,782. It is the second-most populous city in Djibouti. The city is predominantly inhabited by the Issa And Gadabursi Somali The majority of Djibouti and Ali Sabieh's population is Muslim.

== Economy ==
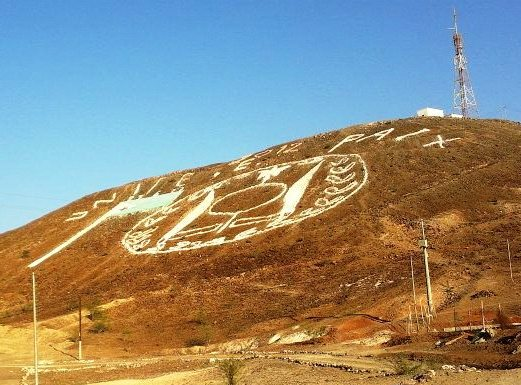
A famous landmark in Ali Sabieh

Ali Sabieh's economy today relies on tourism, agriculture, and a number of small factories, most of which are involved in the building trade. Mobile telephone communications are provided mainly by Djibouti Telecom, which has launched 3G and 4G services to their customers.

== Sports ==
Football and basketball are the most popular sports in Ali Sabieh. One of the football fields has a capacity of 1,500 spectators. It is home to the Djibouti Super Football League's Ali Sabieh FC.

== Education ==
Various primary schools and nurseries are located in Ali Sabieh. There are several state-run and privately owned secondary and high schools in the town. The medium of instruction in both public and private schools is typically French and Arabic, with emphasis on English as a second language.

== Infrastructure ==
=== Transportation ===
Ali Sabieh originally had a railway connection with Djibouti City and Addis Ababa, Ethiopia, with a French-style railway station located in the city centre, but this route has been abandoned. The new Addis Ababa-Djibouti Railway started operation in September 2016, running parallel to the route of the original railway line. The most frequently used public vehicles in the town are auto rickshaws (tuk-tuk). They travel on a number of routes, serving nearly all of the town districts. Intercity bus services are also available, which connect Ali Sabieh to other major cities and towns across Djibouti, including Djibouti City, Dikhil, and Arta.

Paved roads are available in Ali Sabieh, The vast majority of the roads were paved by the French during colonial rule. The local government has repaired some of the roads, but many others are still awaiting repair.

=== Landmarks ===
The town has many old quarters, with houses typically built with brown and black rocks and mosques that are usually white-washed. Some have lost ground to more modern developments. Notable landmarks include Ali Sabieh Mountain, the national emblem of Djibouti, and the Arrei Mountains, the highest point in Ali Sabieh region.

=== Health care ===
Ali Sabieh is the medical hub of Ali Sabieh Region. Hospital Dr. Absieh is a key healthcare institution situated in Ali Sabieh, delivering essential medical services to the community.

== Notable people ==
- Aden Robleh Awaleh: Politician and president of the National Democratic Party (PND).
- Mahmoud Harbi: Politician
- Hussein Ahmed Salah: Djiboutian long-distance runner
- Sultan Mahomed Haji Dideh: Politician engaged with colonial authorities
- Omar Farah Iltireh: Djiboutian politician
- Aden Farah Samatar: Djiboutian musician
- Moumina Houssein Darar: Djiboutian Anti-Terrorism Police Investigator.
- Aicha Bogoreh: First lady of Djibouti
- Kadra Ahmed Hassan: Djibouti's Permanent Representative to the United Nations and the World Trade Organization.
- Nima Djama: Djiboutian musician
- Abdo Hamargod: Djiboutian musician

== Sister towns ==
Country	Town
Turkey	Bayburt
Chile	Vicuña

== See also ==
- Railway stations in Djibouti
