= Ali Sabieh Region =

Coordinates: 11°08′N 42°43′E

Ali Sabieh Gobolka Cali Sabiix على صبيح
- Region (Gobolka)
- Country: Djibouti
- Administrative centre: Ali Sabieh

Area
  - Total: 2,400 km^{2} (930 sq mi)

Population (2024 census)
  - Total: 76,414
  - Density: 32/km^{2} (82/sq mi)
- ISO 3166 code: DJ-AS

Ali Sabieh Region (Arabic: إقليم على صبيح, Somali: Gobolka Cali Sabiix) is a region in southern Djibouti. With a mainland area of 2,400 square kilometres (900 sq mi), it lies along the national border with Somalia and Ethiopia, bordering also the Dikhil Region to the west and the Arta Region to the north. Its capital is Ali Sabieh. The Arrei Mountains are the highest point in the region.

== History ==
Nomadic life in the Ali Sabieh Region dates back at least 2,000 years. During the Middle Ages, the Ali Sabieh Region was ruled by the Ifat Sultanate and the Adal Sultanate. It later formed a part of the French Somaliland protectorate in the first half of the 20th century. Considered the border with Ethiopia, the area had few permanent settlements at the turn of the 20th century. In 1904, a report notes that "when the border post of Ali Sabieh, it has the appearance of a fortress. Attached to the circle of "Gobad-Dikkil" from its inception in 1931, Ali Sabieh became the chief town of a circle autonomously 1939. It was briefly attached to the circle of Djibouti between 1946 and 1949. It is managed by the commander of the circle Dikhil between 1952 and 1958, before finally receive its own administration.

== Overview ==
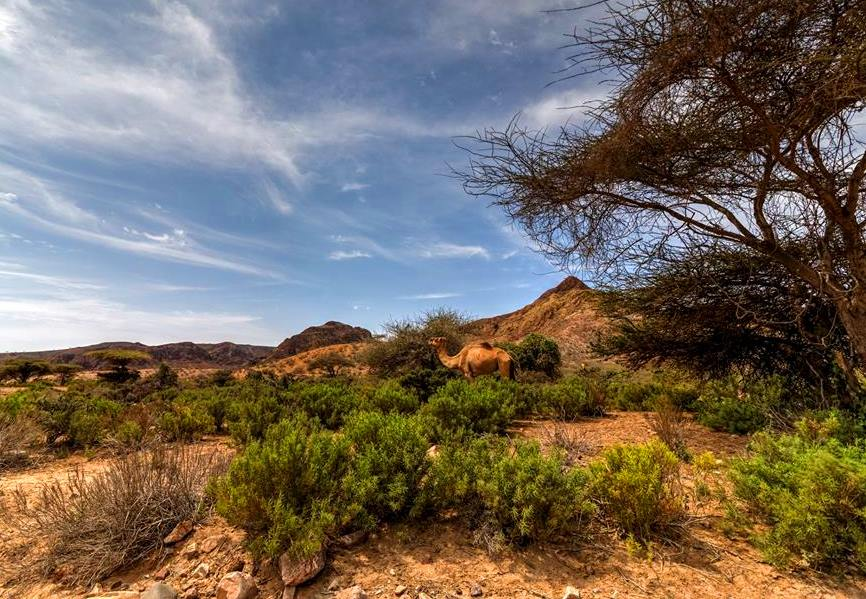
Grazing camel in Ali Sabieh Region

The region borders Arta Region to the north, the Dikhil Region to the west, the nation of Somalia (Somaliland) to the east, and the nation of Ethiopia to the south. Largely arid, the Ali Sabieh region is noted for its bare plains of Grand Bara and its large mountains, such as Ali Olo.

The region has many old forts built by the French Army in the 20th century. The inhabitants of the Ali Sabieh region belong mainly to the people of Gadabursi and Issa Somali clans. In 1963, during the first Somali-Ethiopian war, a terrible massacre was perpetrated by the Ethiopian soldiers in Aysha, mainly populated by Gadabursi and Issa Somali. Among the latter, those who succeeded in fleeing arrived at Dikhil and Ali-Sabieh. At Ali-Sabieh, the colonial administration installed them in a new area. In 1977, during the Ogaden War between Somalia and Ethiopia, a second wave of populations fleeing hostilities took refuge in Ali Sabieh.

In 1984, a severe drought struck the Aysha and Hadagalah regions, and decimated thousands of people and hundreds of thousands of sheep and cattle. It also caused a human flood of refugees, particularly towards Ali Sabieh. In 1991, during the Somali Civil War, a fourth wave of populations came to take refuge in Ali Sabieh and also in Ali Adde and Holhol.

The local commercial sector is centered on construction (cement) and storage of goods in transit to Ethiopia. Towns in the region have experienced significant growth with the increasing industrialization. The area has also seen some investment.
