= List of deserts by area =

This article provides a list of deserts ranked by the total area that they cover on Earth. Only deserts greater than 50,000 km^{2} (19,300 sq mi) are included in this ranking.

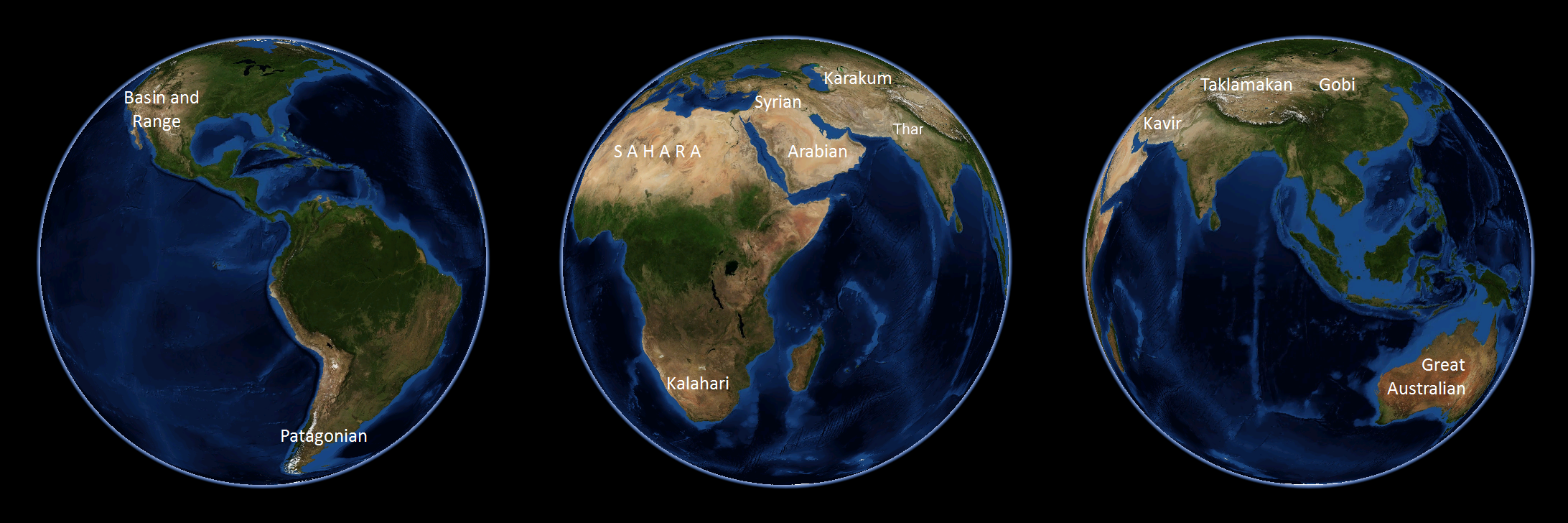
Labelled view in NASA WorldWind of some of the largest non-polar deserts spanning parts of Earth.

Rank	Name	Type	Map	Area (km^{2})	Area (sq mi)	Location (Note: As per the United Nations geoscheme.)	Countries
1	Antarctic Desert	Polar ice and tundra		14,200,000	5,500,000	Antarctica	N/A
2	Arctic Desert	Polar ice and tundra		13,900,000	5,400,000	Northern America; Northern Europe; Eastern Europe	Canada (Yukon, Northwest Territories, and Nunavut), Finland, Greenland, Iceland, Norway (Svalbard and Jan Mayen), Russia (Siberia), Sweden, and the United States (Alaska)
3	Sahara Desert	Subtropical		9,200,000	3,600,000	Northern Africa; Western Africa; Middle Africa	Algeria, Chad, Egypt, Eritrea, Libya, Mali, Mauritania, Morocco, Niger, Sudan, Tunisia, and Western Sahara
4	Arabian Desert	Subtropical		2,330,000	900,000	Western Asia; Northern Africa	Egypt (Sinai Peninsula), Iraq, Israel, Jordan, Kuwait, Oman, Palestine, Qatar, Saudi Arabia, United Arab Emirates, and Yemen
5	Great Australian Desert	Subtropical		1,371,000	529,000	Australasia	Australia
6	Gobi Desert	Cold winter		1,295,000	500,000	Eastern Asia	China and Mongolia
7	Kalahari Desert	Subtropical		900,000	350,000	Southern Africa	Botswana, Namibia, and South Africa
8	Patagonian Desert	Cold winter		673,000	260,000	South America	Argentina and Chile
9	Syrian Desert	Subtropical		500,000	193,100	Western Asia	Iraq, Jordan, Saudi Arabia, and Syria
10	Great Basin Desert	Cold winter		492,000	190,000	Northern America	United States (Nevada, Utah, California, and Idaho)
11	Chihuahuan Desert	Subtropical		450,000	175,000	Central America; Northern America	Mexico and the United States
12	Karakum Desert	Cold winter		350,000	140,000	Central Asia	Turkmenistan
–	Great Victoria Desert (Note: Part of the Great Australian Desert.)	Subtropical		348,750	134,650	Australasia	Australia
13	Colorado Plateau	Cold winter		340,000	130,000	Northern America	United States
14	Taklamakan Desert	Cold winter		337,000	130,000	Eastern Asia	China
15	Sonoran Desert	Subtropical		310,000	120,000	Central America; Northern America	Mexico and the United States
16	Kyzylkum Desert	Cold winter		300,000	115,000	Central Asia	Kazakhstan, Turkmenistan, and Uzbekistan
–	Great Sandy Desert	Subtropical		267,250	103,190	Australasia	Australia
17	Thar Desert	Subtropical		264,091	101,966	Southern Asia	India and Pakistan
18	Ogaden Desert	Tropical		200,000	77,000	Eastern Africa	Ethiopia, Somalia, and Somaliland
19	Ustyurt Plateau	Cold winter		200,000	77,000	Central Asia	Kazakhstan, Turkmenistan, and Uzbekistan
–	Tanami Desert	Subtropical		184,500	71,200	Australasia	Australia
–	Simpson Desert	Subtropical		176,500	68,100	Australasia	Australia
–	Gibson Desert	Subtropical		156,000	60,000	Australasia	Australia
20	Margo Desert	Subtropical		150,000	58,000	Southern Asia	Afghanistan
21	Registan Desert	Subtropical	The shifting dunes of the Northern Registan Desert	146,000	56,000	Southern Asia	Afghanistan
22	Atacama Desert	Mild coastal		140,000	54,000	South America	Chile and Peru
23	Danakil Desert	Tropical		136,956	52,879	Eastern Africa	Djibouti, Eritrea, and Ethiopia
24	Mojave Desert	Subtropical		124,000	48,000	Northern America	United States
–	Little Sandy Desert	Subtropical		115,000	43,100	Australasia	Australia
25	Chalbi Desert	Tropical		98,000	38,000	Eastern Africa	Kenya
26	Columbia Basin	Cold winter		83,100	32,100	Northern America	Canada and the United States
27	Namib Desert	Cool coastal		81,000	31,000	Middle Africa; Southern Africa	Angola, Namibia, and South Africa
–	Strzelecki Desert	Subtropical		80,250	30,980	Australasia	Australia
28	Great Salt Desert	Subtropical		77,000	30,000	Southern Asia	Iran
29	Ferlo Desert	Tropical/subtropical		70,000	27,000	Western Africa	Senegal
30	Ladakh	Cold winter		59,146	22,836	Southern Asia	India (Note: Ladakh exists as an Indian union territory, but it is part of the Kashmir dispute, which involves India against Pakistan and China.)
31	Lut Desert	Subtropical		52,000	20,000	Southern Asia	Iran

== See also ==
- List of deserts (all deserts and pseudo-deserts by continent)
- Desertification
  - Polar desert
- United Nations Convention to Combat Desertification
  - Desert greening
