= Rangi (video game) =

2017 video game

- Rangi cover art from the Gear VR release (January 2017)
- Developer: Funsoft
- Publisher: Digigo
- Engine: Unity
- Platform: Gear VR
- Release: January 2017
- Genres: Puzzle, virtual reality
- Mode: Single-player

Rangi is a single-player virtual reality adventure puzzle game designed by Moroccan indie studio Funsoft and published by Digigo. It is currently available on Samsung Gear VR, and will be released on Oculus Rift later in 2017. It also has a Greenlight campaign on Steam. Rangi is distinguished by its tribal art and music, mythology and folklore, and African-inspired landscapes.

Several of the game developers are former members of Ubisoft Casablanca. The game was created with Unity.

== Storyline ==
The player takes on the role of Guruki, a chosen one who is prophesied to bring back an ancient music source that has been locked away by a negative force. In the land of Ota, the Musiki (Music Giants) once roamed the land and played music to Ota's people, the Nchi, which maintained harmony and peace in their society. A group of beings called the Matata (a.k.a. "the interrupters") arrived one day and stole away the Musiki's life force, the Chúkwú, which stopped the music from playing. The Matata locked the Chúkwú away in secret puzzles throughout Ota. At the start of the game, the music is beginning to fade and is at risk of disappearing completely.

The Nchi believe that Guruki will be able to unlock the puzzles, return the Chúkwú to the Musiki, and restore music and balance to Ota.

== Gameplay ==
Image from outside the architectural ruins in Rangi

View from inside the architectural ruins. The lines on the wall light up when puzzle pieces are aligned.

The player's objective is to solve all of the puzzles, which will unlock the Music Giants' life force (Chúkwú) and return the music to Ota. Game instructions are given by introducing one concept at a time to gradually expand the player's skills (a common gaming application of scaffolding). Game controls are manipulated by focusing the central point of the virtual plane onto objects in the game environment. By this mechanism, players are able to:

- move from point to point via the teleportation control method by focusing on "light forces," which are orbs of light floating in the air;
- manipulate and align puzzle pieces to solve the puzzles;
- collect hidden artifacts.

The game environment consists of ancient architectural ruins in an African desert setting. Players may interact with puzzle pieces inside and outside these buildings, and gain access to new spaces by solving the puzzles. African-inspired tribal music plays throughout the game, provided by wandering Musiki.

Funsoft designers aimed to closely unite the puzzle gameplay with the African art in the game design.

== Reception ==
In the weeks after its launch, Rangi received overall positive reviews that praised its originality and unique take on puzzle games. Virtual reality news website UploadVR noted that Rangi "delivers a rich world" and "provide[s] a deep and rewarding puzzle experience." Virtual Reality Reporter called Rangi "a gameplay experience like no other" and praised its level of immersion and detail.
