= Polar desert =

Region of Earth

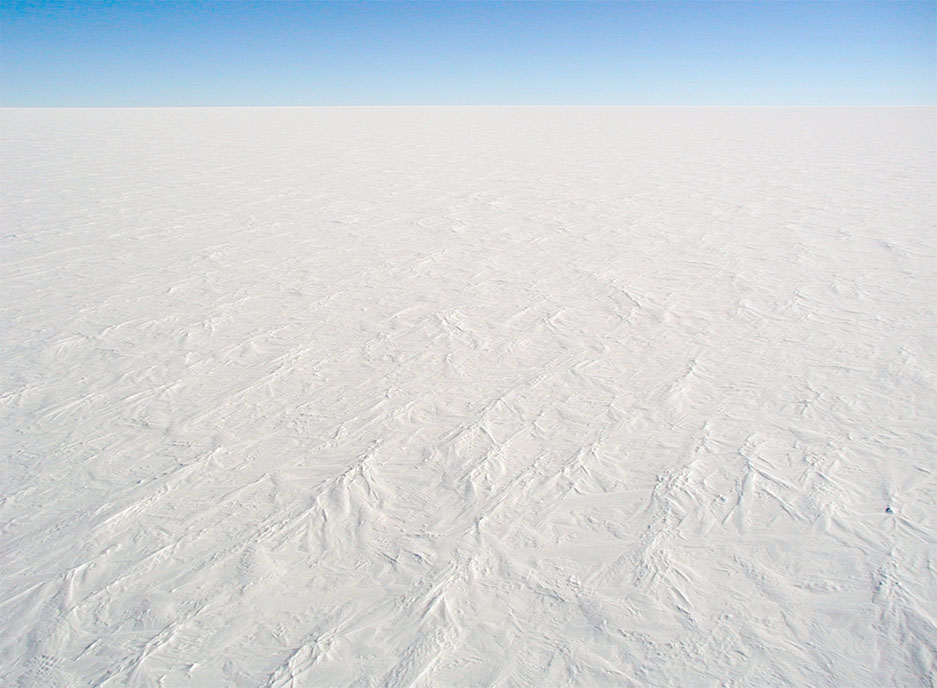
Polar desert with ground pattern characteristic of freeze-thaw alternation

Polar deserts are the regions of Earth that fall under an ice cap climate (EF under the Köppen classification). Despite rainfall totals low enough to normally classify as a desert, polar deserts are distinguished from true deserts (BWh or BWk under the Köppen classification) by low annual temperatures and evapotranspiration. Most polar deserts are covered in ice sheets, ice fields, or ice caps, and they are also called white deserts.

Polar deserts are one of two polar biomes, the other being Arctic tundra. These biomes are located at the poles of Earth, covering much of the Antarctic in the southern hemisphere, and in the northern hemisphere extending from the Arctic into North America, Europe and Asia. Unlike the tundra that can support plant and animal life in the summer, polar deserts are largely barren environments, comprising permanent, flat layers of ice; due to the scarcity of liquid water, the same is also true of the few ice-free areas. However, there is evidence of some life in this seemingly inhospitable landscape: sediments of organic and inorganic substances in the thick ice host microbial organisms closely related to cyanobacteria, able to fix carbon dioxide from the melting water.

Temperature changes in polar deserts frequently cross the freezing point of water. This "freeze-thaw" alternation forms patterned textures on the ground, as much as 5 m (16 ft) in diameter.

Most of the interior of Antarctica is polar desert, despite the thick ice cover. Conversely, the McMurdo Dry Valleys of Antarctica, although they have had no ice for thousands of years due to katabatic wind but contain ephemeral streams and hypersaline lakes characteristic of extreme non-polar deserts, are not necessarily polar deserts.

Polar deserts are relatively common during ice ages, as ice ages tend to be dry.

Climate scientists have voiced concerns about the effects of global warming to the ice poles in these polar biomes.

Effects and transpiration on climate

== See also ==
- Desertification
- List of deserts by area
- List of deserts by continent
