= Ali Olo =

Mountain in Djibouti

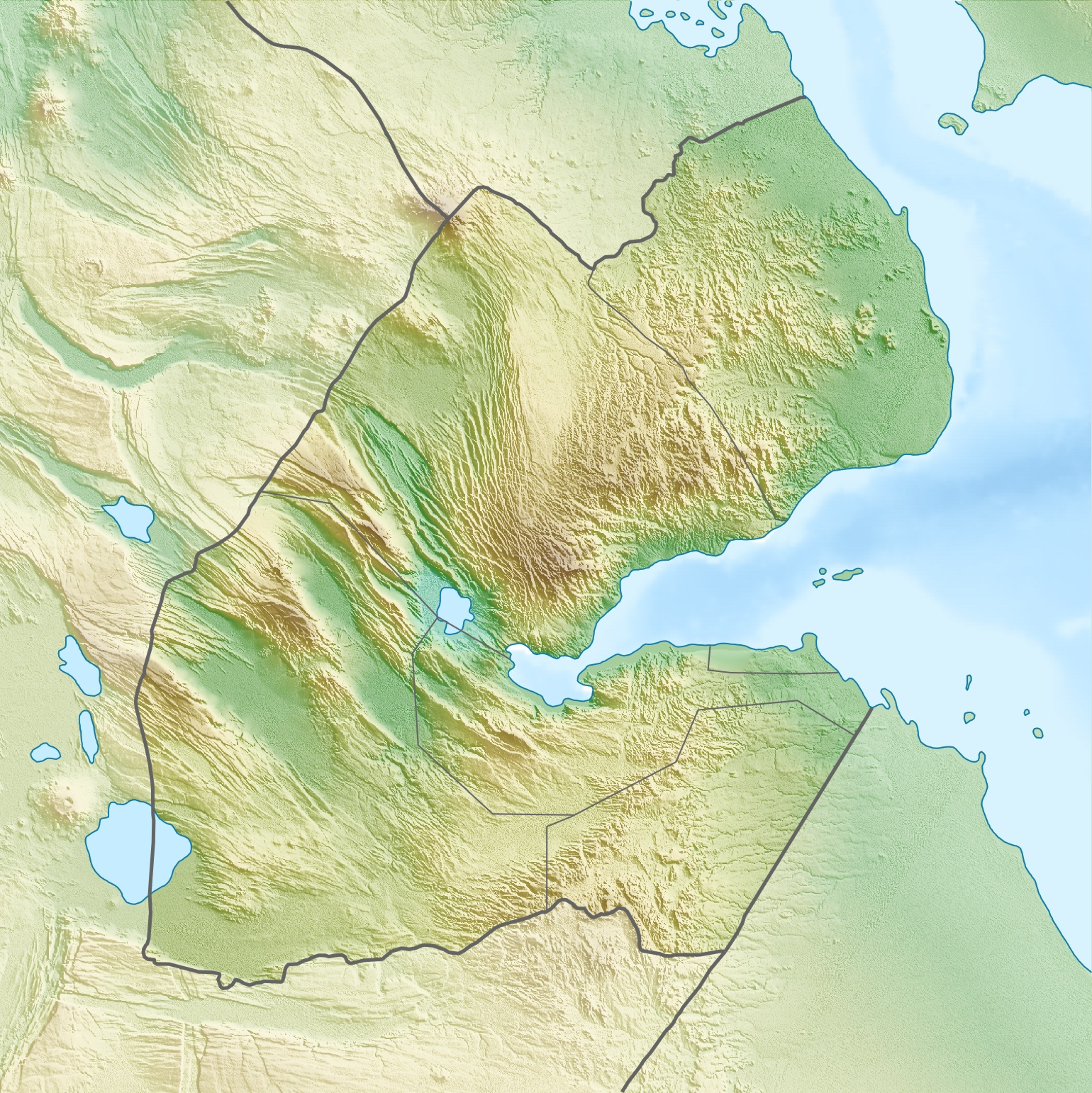
- Location within Djibouti

Highest point
- Elevation: 286 m (938 ft)
- Coordinates: 11°21′20″N 43°07′24″E

Geography
- Location: Ali Sabieh Region, Djibouti

Ali Olo is a mountain located in the northeast of Ali Sabieh Region in Djibouti. With an average elevation of 286 metres (938 ft) above sea level, the mountain is situated near the border with Somalia.
