= Desert climate =

Arid climate subtype

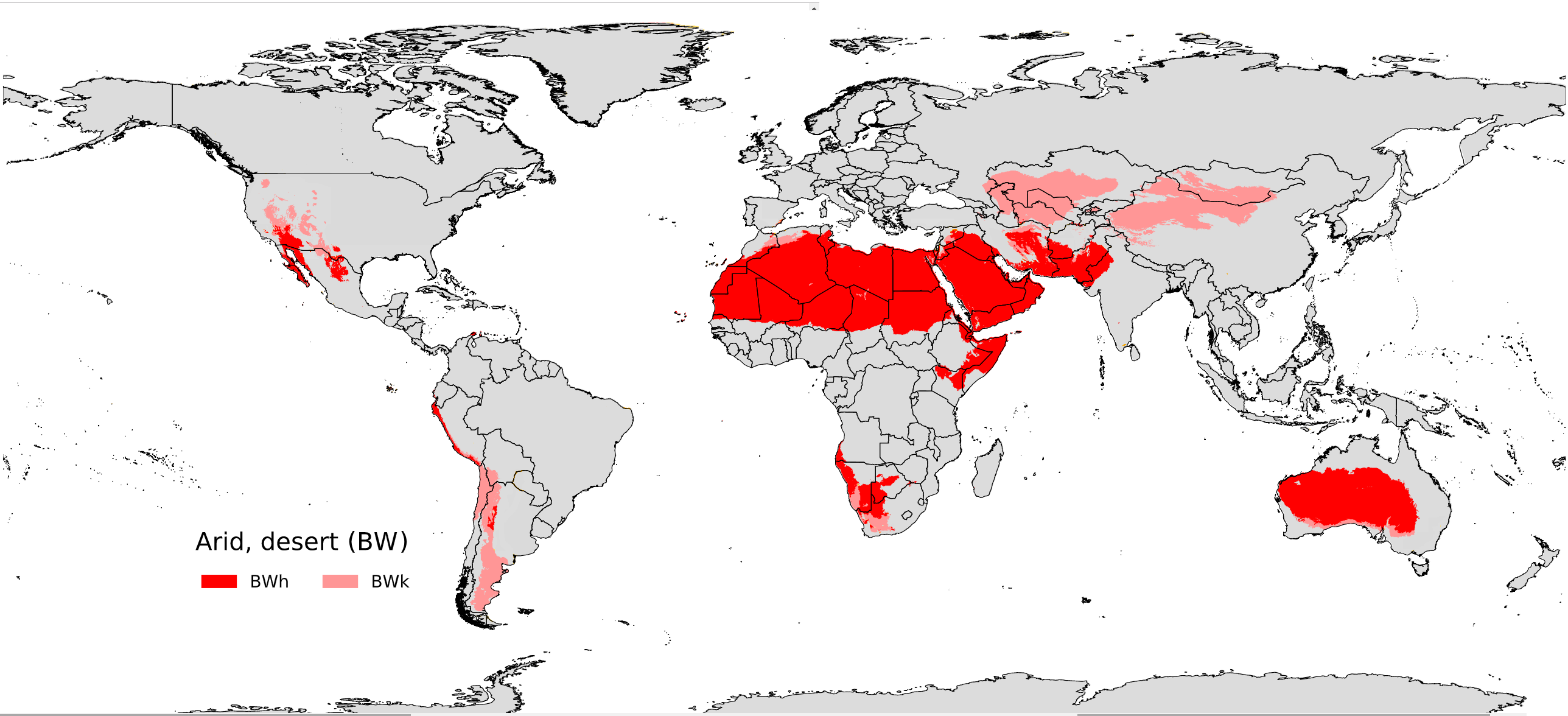
Regions with desert climates BWh (hot desert climates) BWk (cold desert climates)

The desert climate or arid climate (in the Köppen climate classification BWh and BWk) is a dry climate sub-type in which there is a severe excess of evaporation over precipitation. The typically bald, rocky, or sandy surfaces in desert climates are dry and hold little moisture, quickly evaporating the already little rainfall they receive. The BWh (hot desert) climate is the most extensive Köppen climate type, covering approximately 14.2% of Earth's land area.

There are two variations of a desert climate according to the Köppen climate classification: a hot desert climate (BWh), and a cold desert climate (BWk). To delineate "hot desert climates" from "cold desert climates", a mean annual temperature of 18 °C (64.4 °F) is used as an isotherm so that a location with a B-type climate with the appropriate temperature above this isotherm is classified as "hot arid subtype" (BWh), and a location with the appropriate temperature below the isotherm is classified as "cold arid subtype" (BWk).

Most desert/arid climates receive between 25 and 200 mm (1 and 8 in) of rainfall annually, although some of the most consistently hot areas of Central Australia, the Sahel and Guajira Peninsula can be, due to extreme potential evapotranspiration, classed as arid with the annual rainfall as high as 430 millimetres or 17 inches.

== Precipitation ==
Although no part of Earth is known for certain to be rainless, in the Atacama Desert of northern Chile, the average annual rainfall over 17 years was only 5 millimetres (0.20 in). Some locations in the Sahara Desert such as Kufra, Libya, record an even drier 0.86 mm (0.034 in) of rainfall annually. The official weather station in Death Valley, United States reports 60 mm (2.4 in) annually, but in 40 months between 1931 and 1934 a total of just 16 mm (0.63 in) of rainfall was measured.

To determine whether a location has an arid climate, the precipitation threshold is determined. The precipitation threshold (in millimetres) involves first multiplying the average annual temperature in °C by 20, then adding 280 if 70% or more of the total precipitation is in the high-sun summer half of the year (April through September in the Northern Hemisphere, or October through March in the Southern), or 140 if 30–70% of the total precipitation is received during the applicable period, or 0 if less than 30% of the total precipitation is so received there. If the area's annual precipitation is less than half the threshold (50%), it is classified as a BW (desert climate), while 50–100% of the threshold results in a semi-arid climate.

== Hot desert climates ==
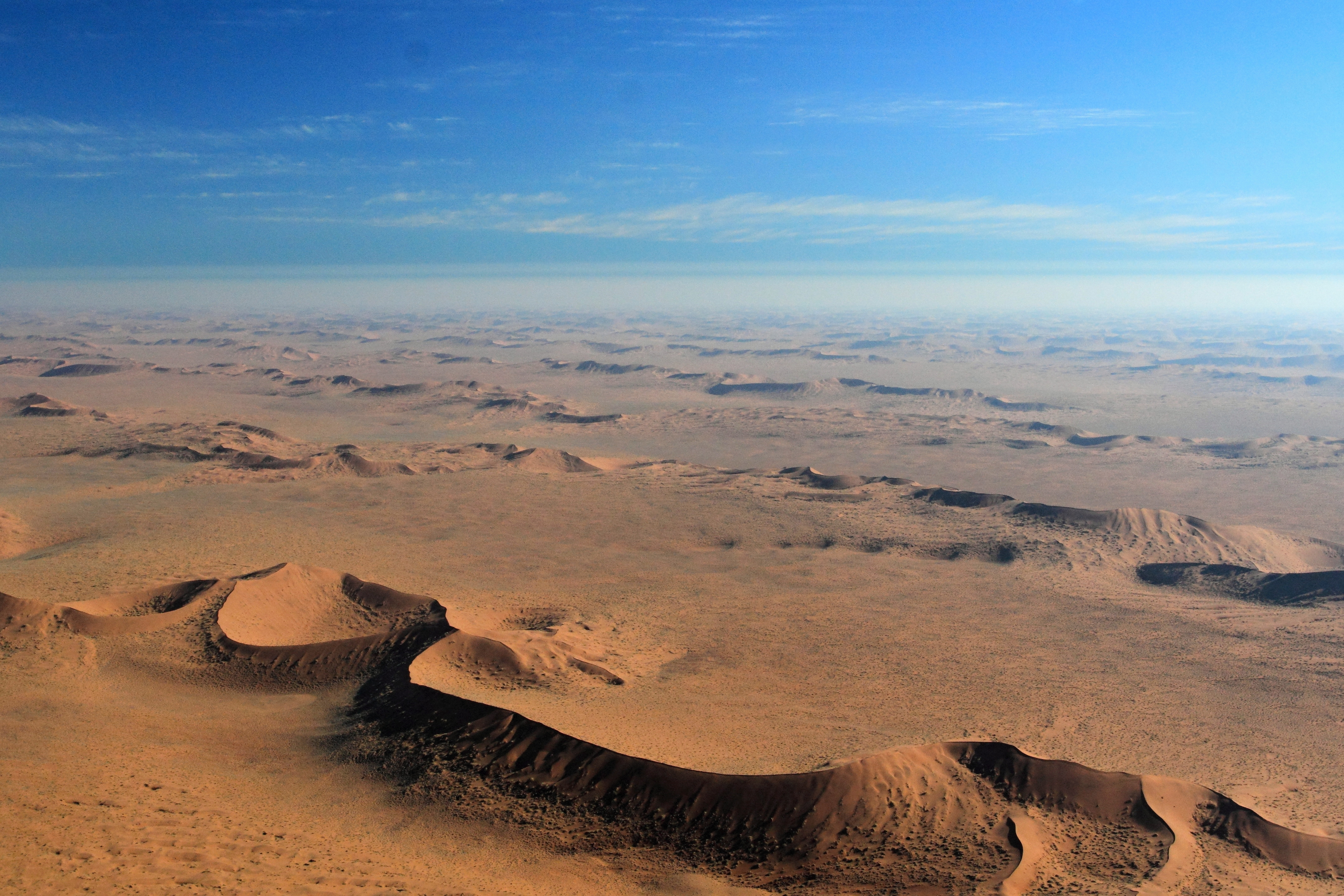
Namib Desert in Southern Africa

Hot desert climates (BWh) are typically found under the subtropical ridge in the lower middle latitudes or the subtropics, often between 20° and 33° north and south latitudes. In these locations, stable descending air and high pressure aloft clear clouds and create hot, arid conditions with intense sunshine. Hot desert climates are found across vast areas of North Africa, West Asia, northwestern parts of the Indian subcontinent, southwestern Africa, interior Australia, the Southwestern United States, northern Mexico, the coast of Peru and Chile, parts of the Brazilian sertão and the southeastern coast of Spain. This makes hot deserts present in every continent except Antarctica.

At the time of high sun (summer), scorching, desiccating heat prevails. Hot-month average temperatures are normally between 29 and 35 °C (84 and 95 °F), and midday readings of 43–46 °C (109–115 °F) are common. The world's absolute heat records, over 50 °C (122 °F), are generally in the hot deserts, where the heat potential can be the highest on the planet. This includes the record of 56.7 °C (134.1 °F) in Death Valley, which is currently considered the highest temperature recorded on Earth. Some deserts in the tropics consistently experience very high temperatures all year long, even during wintertime. These locations feature some of the highest annual average temperatures recorded on Earth, exceeding 30 °C (86 °F), up to nearly 35 °C (95 °F) in Dallol, Ethiopia. This last feature is seen in sections of Africa and Arabia. During colder periods of the year, night-time temperatures can drop to freezing or below due to the exceptional radiation loss under the clear skies. However, temperatures rarely drop far below freezing under the hot subtype.

Regions with hot desert climates

Hot desert climates can be found in the deserts of North Africa such as the wide Sahara Desert, the Libyan Desert or the Nubian Desert; deserts of the Horn of Africa such as the Danakil Desert or the Grand Bara Desert; deserts of Southern Africa such as the Namib Desert or the Kalahari Desert; deserts of West Asia such as the Arabian Desert, or the Syrian Desert; deserts of South Asia such as Dasht-e Lut and Dasht-e Kavir of Iran or the Thar Desert of India and Pakistan; deserts of the United States and Mexico such as the Mojave Desert, the Sonoran Desert or the Chihuahuan Desert; deserts of Australia such as the Simpson Desert or the Great Victoria Desert and many other regions. In Europe, the hot desert climate can only be found on southeastern coast of Spain as well as small inland parts of southeastern, especially parts of the Tabernas Desert.

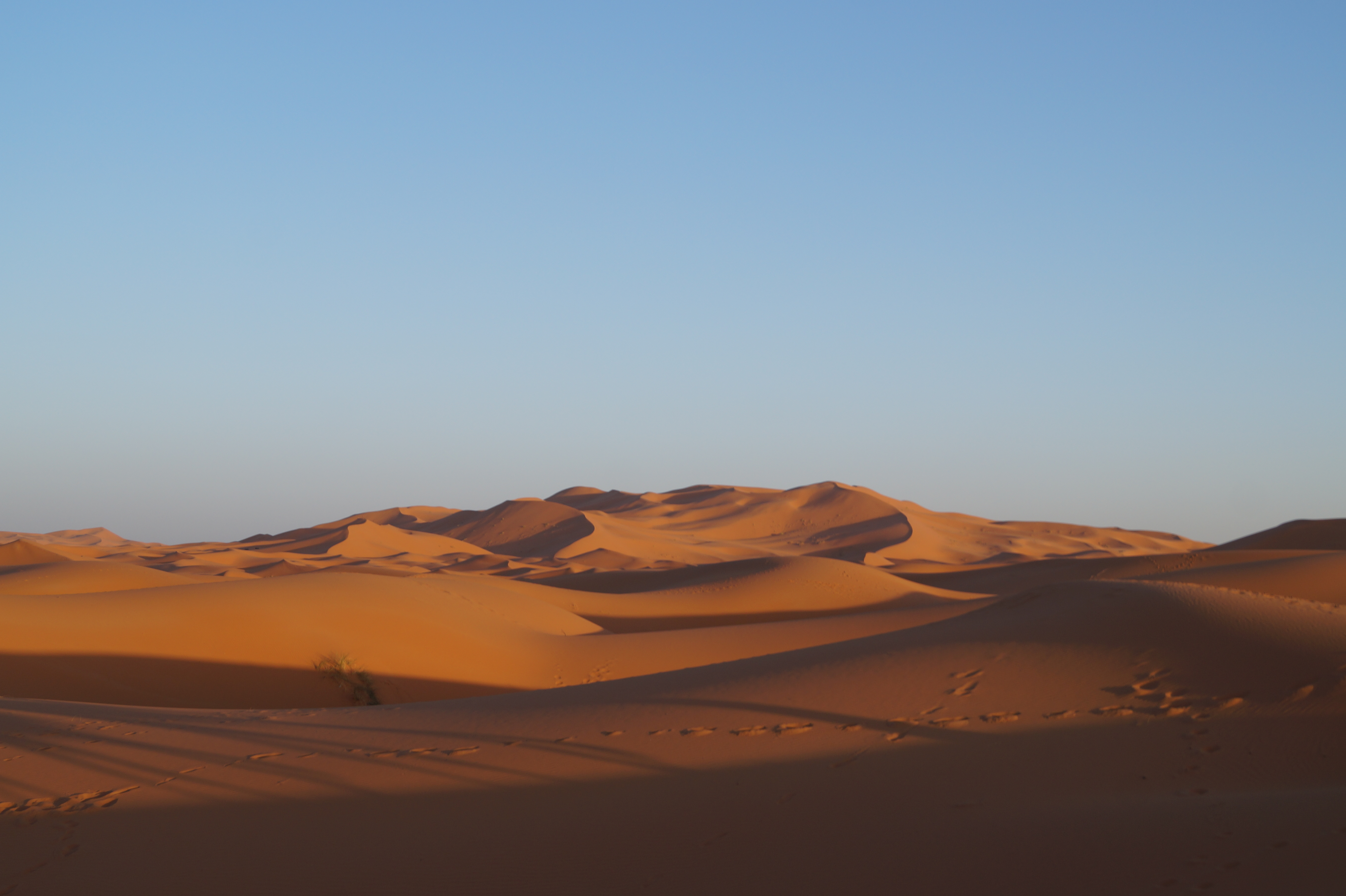
Sahara Desert in Morocco.

Hot deserts are lands of extremes: most of them are among the hottest, the driest, and the sunniest places on Earth because of nearly constant high pressure; the almost permanent removal of low-pressure systems, dynamic fronts, and atmospheric disturbances; sinking air motion; dry atmosphere near the surface and aloft; the exacerbated exposure to the sun where solar angles are always high makes this desert inhospitable to most species.

== Cold desert climates ==
Regions with cold desert climates

Cold desert climates (BWk) usually feature hot (or warm in a few instances), dry summers, though summers are not typically as hot as hot desert climates. Unlike hot desert climates, cold desert climates tend to feature cold, dry winters. Snow tends to be rare in regions with this climate. The Gobi Desert in northern China and Mongolia is one example of a cold desert. Though hot in the summer, it shares the freezing winters of the rest of Inner Asia. Summers in South America's Atacama Desert are mild, with only slight temperature variations between seasons. Cold desert climates are typically found at higher altitudes than hot desert climates and are usually drier than hot desert climates.

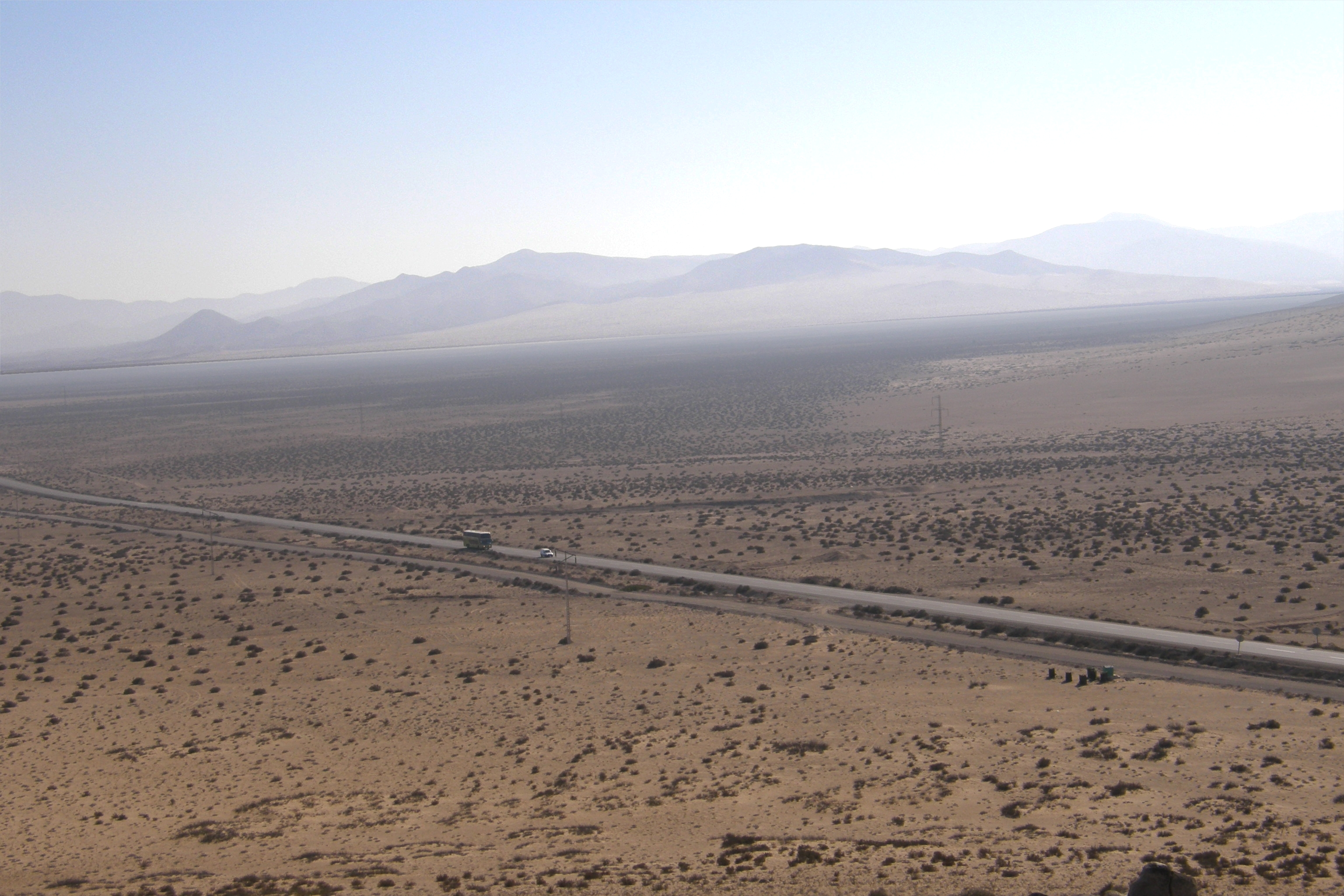
The Atacama Desert in Chile

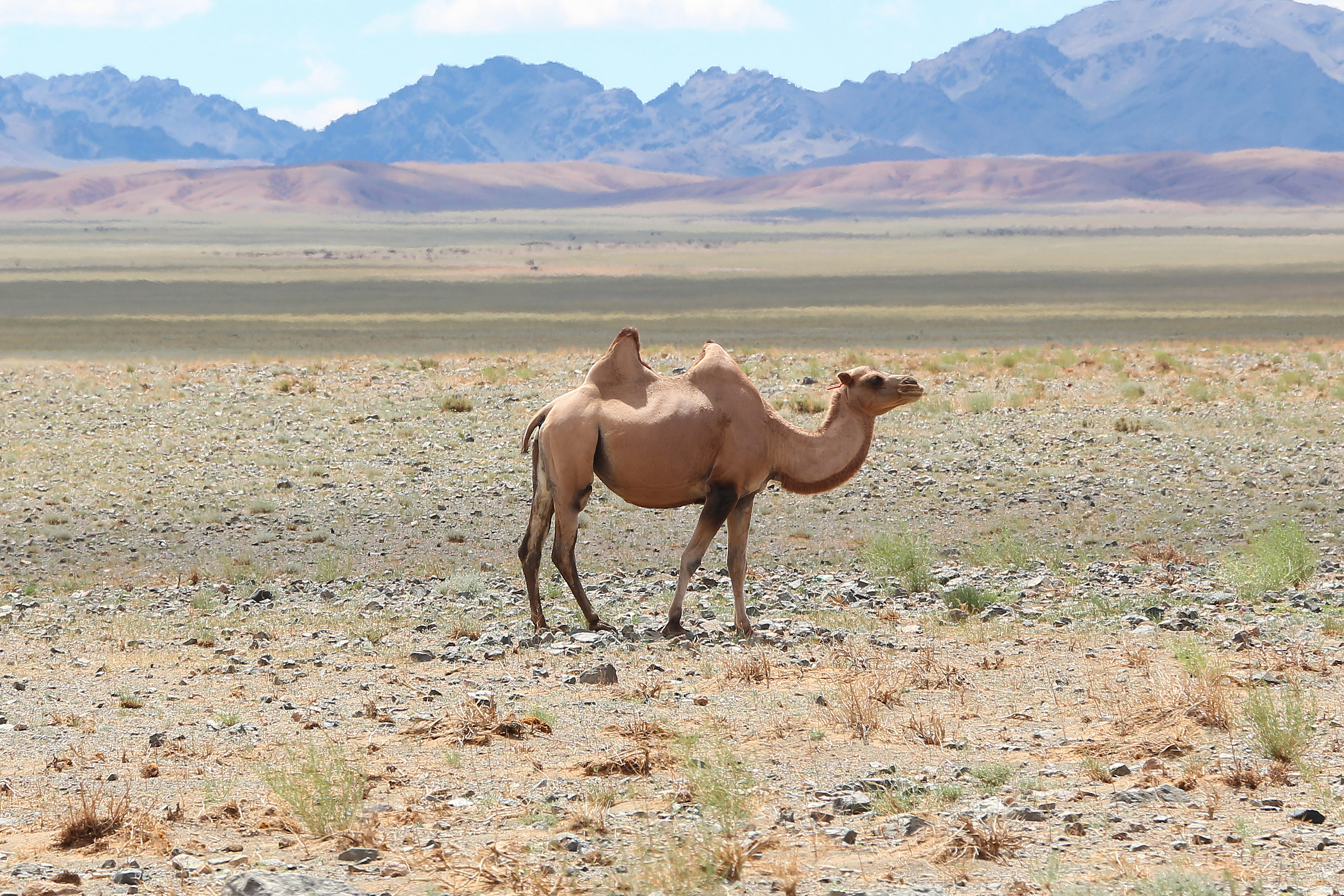
The Gobi Desert in Mongolia

Cold desert climates are typically located in temperate zones in the 30s and 40s latitudes, usually in the leeward rain shadow of high mountains, restricting precipitation from the westerly winds. An example of this is the Patagonian Desert in Argentina, bounded by the Andes ranges to its west. In the case of Central Asia, mountains restrict precipitation from the eastern monsoon. The Kyzyl Kum, Taklamakan and Katpana Desert deserts of Central Asia are other significant examples of BWk climates. The Ladakh region and the city of Leh in the Great Himalayas in India also have a cold desert climate. In North America, the cold desert climate occurs in the drier parts of the Great Basin Desert, the Bighorn Basin in Wyoming, and the Columbia Plateau in eastern Washington and eastern Oregon. The Hautes Plaines, located in the northeastern section of Morocco and in Algeria, is another prominent example of a cold desert climate. In Europe, this climate only occurs in some inland parts of southeastern Spain, such as in Lorca.

Polar climate desert areas in the Arctic and Antarctic regions receive very little precipitation during the year owing to the cold, dry air freezing most precipitation. Polar desert climates have desert-like features that occur in cold desert climates, including intermittent streams, hypersaline lakes, and extremely barren terrain in unglaciated areas such as the McMurdo Dry Valleys of Antarctica. These areas are generally classified as having polar climates because they have average summer temperatures below 10 °C (50 °F) even if they have some characteristics of extreme non-polar deserts.

== Climate charts ==
=== Hot deserts ===
Sabha, Libya

Climate chart (precipitation, max. and min. temperature)
J	F	M	A	M	J	J	A	S	O	N	D
7 19 6	0 21 8	10 26 12	7 32 17	1 36 22	0 39 25	0 39 25	0 39 25	0 38 24	0 29 19	1 26 12	1 20 7
- █ Average max. and min. temperatures in °C
- █ Precipitation totals in mm
- Source: World Weather Online
Imperial conversion
J	F	M	A	M	J	J	A	S	O	N	D
0.3 66 43	0 70 46	0.4 79 54	0.3 90 63	0 97 72	0 102 77	0 102 77	0 102 77	0 100 75	0 84 66	0 79 54	0 68 45
- █ Average max. and min. temperatures in °F
- █ Precipitation totals in inches

Karachi, Pakistan (bordering on semi arid)

Climate chart (precipitation, max. and min. temperature)
J	F	M	A	M	J	J	A	S	O	N	D
11 26 12	5.5 29 15	3.2 33 19	21 35 24	26 36 27	45 36 29	73 34 28	105 33 27	44 33 26	13 36 23	0.7 33 18	5.6 28 13
- █ Average max. and min. temperatures in °C
- █ Precipitation totals in mm
- Source: NOAA
Imperial conversion
J	F	M	A	M	J	J	A	S	O	N	D
0.4 79 54	0.2 84 59	0.1 91 67	0.8 95 75	1 96 81	1.8 96 83	2.9 92 82	4.1 91 80	1.7 92 79	0.5 96 73	0 91 64	0.2 83 56
- █ Average max. and min. temperatures in °F
- █ Precipitation totals in inches

Las Vegas, Nevada, United States

Climate chart (precipitation, max. and min. temperature)
J	F	M	A	M	J	J	A	S	O	N	D
14 15 5	20 17 7	11 22 10	5.1 26 14	1.8 31 19	1 37 24	9.7 40 28	8.1 39 27	8.1 35 22	8.1 27 15	7.6 20 9	11 14 4
- █ Average max. and min. temperatures in °C
- █ Precipitation totals in mm
- Source: NOAA
Imperial conversion
J	F	M	A	M	J	J	A	S	O	N	D
0.6 58 40	0.8 63 44	0.4 71 51	0.2 78 57	0.1 89 66	0 99 76	0.4 105 82	0.3 103 81	0.3 95 72	0.3 81 60	0.3 67 47	0.4 57 40
- █ Average max. and min. temperatures in °F
- █ Precipitation totals in inches

Baghdad, Iraq

Climate chart (precipitation, max. and min. temperature)
J	F	M	A	M	J	J	A	S	O	N	D
25 16 5	17 19 7	16 25 11	16 31 16	3.3 37 21	0 43 25	0 45 27	0 45 26	0.1 40 22	7.6 34 17	24 24 10	17 18 6
- █ Average max. and min. temperatures in °C
- █ Precipitation totals in mm
- Source: Climate & Temperature
Imperial conversion
J	F	M	A	M	J	J	A	S	O	N	D
1 61 40	0.7 67 44	0.6 76 51	0.6 87 60	0.1 99 70	0 109 77	0 112 80	0 112 79	0 105 72	0.3 93 63	0.9 75 50	0.7 64 43
- █ Average max. and min. temperatures in °F
- █ Precipitation totals in inches

Coober Pedy, Australia

Climate chart (precipitation, max. and min. temperature)
J	F	M	A	M	J	J	A	S	O	N	D
15 37 22	14 36 22	11 32 19	14 27 14	9.4 22 10	13 18 7	4.8 19 6	6.6 21 8	8.2 26 11	13 29 14	15 32 18	19 35 20
- █ Average max. and min. temperatures in °C
- █ Precipitation totals in mm
- Source: Bureau of Meteorology (1994–2024 normals, extremes to 1965)
Imperial conversion
J	F	M	A	M	J	J	A	S	O	N	D
0.6 98 72	0.6 96 71	0.4 90 65	0.6 81 58	0.4 72 50	0.5 65 44	0.2 66 43	0.3 70 46	0.3 78 52	0.5 84 58	0.6 90 64	0.8 94 68
- █ Average max. and min. temperatures in °F
- █ Precipitation totals in inches

Lima, Peru

Climate chart (precipitation, max. and min. temperature)
J	F	M	A	M	J	J	A	S	O	N	D
0.8 26 21	0.4 28 21	0.4 27 21	0.1 25 19	0.3 22 17	0.7 20 17	1 19 16	1.5 19 15	0.7 19 15	0.2 20 16	0.1 22 17	0.2 24 19
- █ Average max. and min. temperatures in °C
- █ Precipitation totals in mm
- Source: National Service of Meteorology and Hydrology of Peru (SENAMHI)
Imperial conversion
J	F	M	A	M	J	J	A	S	O	N	D
0 79 69	0 82 70	0 81 69	0 76 66	0 71 63	0 68 62	0 66 61	0.1 65 59	0 66 60	0 68 61	0 71 63	0 75 66
- █ Average max. and min. temperatures in °F
- █ Precipitation totals in inches

=== Cold deserts ===
Leh, India

Climate chart (precipitation, max. and min. temperature)
J	F	M	A	M	J	J	A	S	O	N	D
4.3 2 −13	2.5 4 −9	1.5 10 −4	1.7 15 2	0.6 20 6	2.9 24 11	6.8 29 16	6.2 28 15	4.4 23 9	2.3 17 0	0.7 11 −7	1 5 −12
- █ Average max. and min. temperatures in °C
- █ Precipitation totals in mm
Imperial conversion
J	F	M	A	M	J	J	A	S	O	N	D
0.2 35 8	0.1 40 15	0.1 49 25	0.1 60 35	0 68 43	0.1 76 52	0.3 83 61	0.2 83 59	0.2 74 49	0.1 62 33	0 51 19	0 40 11
- █ Average max. and min. temperatures in °F
- █ Precipitation totals in inches

Turpan, Xinjiang, China

Climate chart (precipitation, max. and min. temperature)
J	F	M	A	M	J	J	A	S	O	N	D
0.9 −2 −10	0.5 7 −4	0.7 18 6	0.9 28 14	1 34 20	2.6 39 25	2 41 27	2 39 25	1.4 33 18	1.2 23 9	0.6 10 0	0.9 0 −8
- █ Average max. and min. temperatures in °C
- █ Precipitation totals in mm
- Source: China Meteorological Administration
Imperial conversion
J	F	M	A	M	J	J	A	S	O	N	D
0 28 13	0 45 26	0 64 43	0 82 58	0 93 68	0.1 102 76	0.1 105 80	0.1 102 76	0.1 91 65	0 73 48	0 51 33	0 31 18
- █ Average max. and min. temperatures in °F
- █ Precipitation totals in inches

Damascus, Syria

Climate chart (precipitation, max. and min. temperature)
J	F	M	A	M	J	J	A	S	O	N	D
26 13 1	22 15 2	14 20 5	5.6 25 8	4.8 31 12	0.3 35 16	0 38 19	0 38 19	0.3 35 15	6.3 29 11	21 21 5	24 15 2
- █ Average max. and min. temperatures in °C
- █ Precipitation totals in mm
- Source: NOAA (mean temperature 1961–1990, humidity and sun 1970–1990)
Imperial conversion
J	F	M	A	M	J	J	A	S	O	N	D
1 56 33	0.9 60 36	0.5 68 41	0.2 78 46	0.2 88 54	0 96 61	0 100 65	0 100 65	0 94 60	0.2 84 52	0.8 69 41	0.9 59 35
- █ Average max. and min. temperatures in °F
- █ Precipitation totals in inches

Las Cruces, New Mexico, United States

Climate chart (precipitation, max. and min. temperature)
J	F	M	A	M	J	J	A	S	O	N	D
12 15 −1	9.1 18 1	6.6 22 4	5.6 26 8	9.7 31 12	17 36 18	45 35 21	44 34 20	36 31 16	21 26 9	11 20 3	16 15 −1
- █ Average max. and min. temperatures in °C
- █ Precipitation totals in mm
- Source: NOAA
Imperial conversion
J	F	M	A	M	J	J	A	S	O	N	D
0.5 59 30	0.4 64 33	0.3 71 39	0.2 78 46	0.4 87 54	0.7 96 64	1.8 96 69	1.7 94 68	1.4 88 61	0.8 80 48	0.4 68 37	0.6 58 30
- █ Average max. and min. temperatures in °F
- █ Precipitation totals in inches

Aral, Kazakhstan

Climate chart (precipitation, max. and min. temperature)
J	F	M	A	M	J	J	A	S	O	N	D
11 −7 −14	13 −5 −14	16 5 −4	14 18 6	14 27 13	12 32 18	8 34 21	6 33 18	4 25 11	14 16 3	14 4 −4	13 −4 −11
- █ Average max. and min. temperatures in °C
- █ Precipitation totals in mm
- Source: Pogoda.ru.net
Imperial conversion
J	F	M	A	M	J	J	A	S	O	N	D
0.4 20 6	0.5 23 8	0.6 42 24	0.6 65 42	0.6 80 55	0.5 90 65	0.3 94 69	0.2 91 65	0.2 77 52	0.6 60 38	0.6 39 24	0.5 24 11
- █ Average max. and min. temperatures in °F
- █ Precipitation totals in inches

Antofagasta, Chile

Climate chart (precipitation, max. and min. temperature)
J	F	M	A	M	J	J	A	S	O	N	D
0 24 17	0 24 17	0.8 23 16	0.1 21 15	0.2 19 13	1.5 17 12	0.4 17 12	0.8 17 12	0.2 17 13	0.2 19 14	0.1 20 15	0.1 22 16
- █ Average max. and min. temperatures in °C
- █ Precipitation totals in mm
- Source: Dirección Meteorológica de Chile
Imperial conversion
J	F	M	A	M	J	J	A	S	O	N	D
0 74 63	0 74 63	0 73 61	0 69 58	0 66 56	0.1 63 54	0 62 53	0 62 54	0 63 55	0 65 57	0 68 59	0 71 61
- █ Average max. and min. temperatures in °F
- █ Precipitation totals in inches

== See also ==
- Aridity index
- Desert
- Dry climate
- List of deserts
- Semi-arid climate
