= List of deserts =

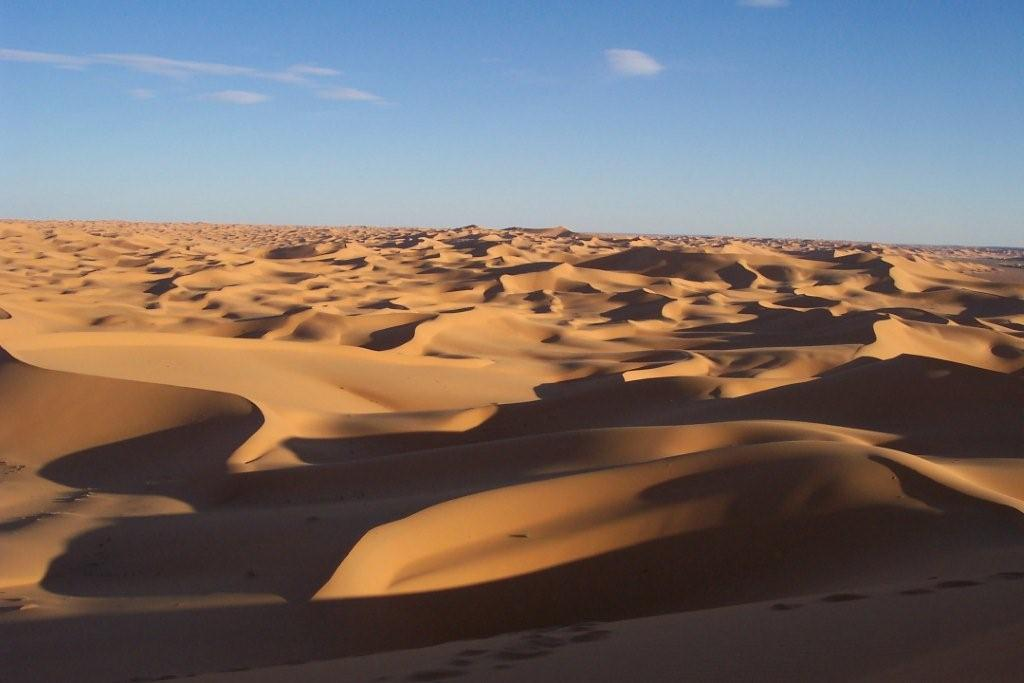
The Sahara is the largest hot desert in the world

This is a list of deserts sorted by the region of the world in which the desert is located.

== Africa ==
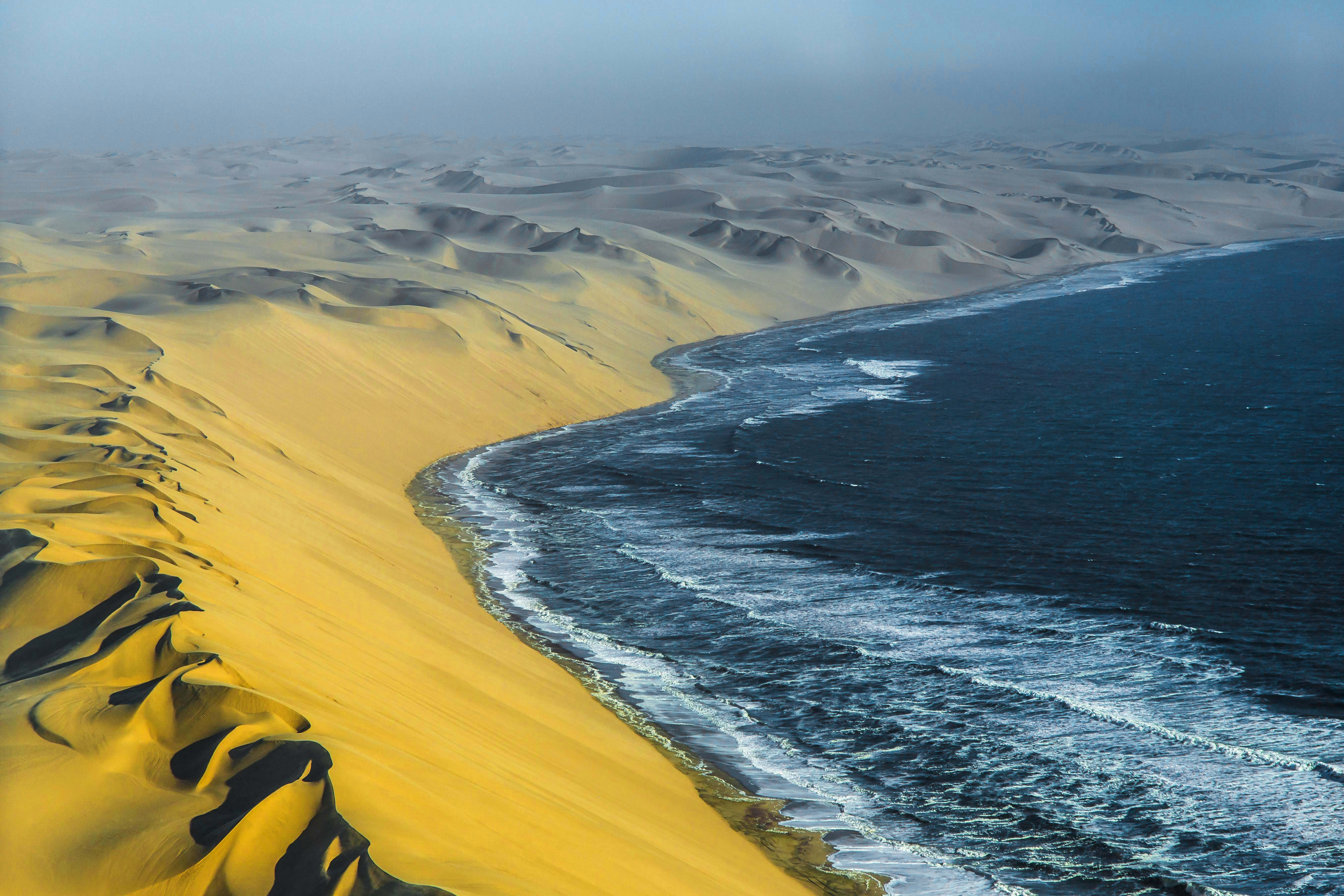
Namib Desert

- Kalahari Desert – a desert covering much of Botswana and parts of Namibia and South Africa
- Karoo Desert – a desert covering parts of southern South Africa
- Namib Desert – a desert in present-day Namibia
- Danakil Desert – a desert lying in the Afar Triangle and covering northeastern Ethiopia, southern Eritrea, southern Djibouti and northwesternmost Somalia
  - Eritrean Coastal Desert – a desert lying along the southern part of the coast of Eritrea and the coast of Djibouti
- Guban Desert – a desert lying along the coast of northwestern Somalia
- Grand Bara Desert – a desert covering parts of south Djibouti
- Chalbi Desert – a desert in northern Kenya along the border with Ethiopia
- Nyiri Desert – a desert located in southern Kenya along the border with Tanzania
- Lompoul Desert – a desert lying in northwestern Senegal between Dakar and Saint-Louis
- Sahara Desert – Africa's largest desert and the world's largest hot desert which covers much of North Africa comprising:
  - Ténéré – a desert covering northeastern Niger and western Chad
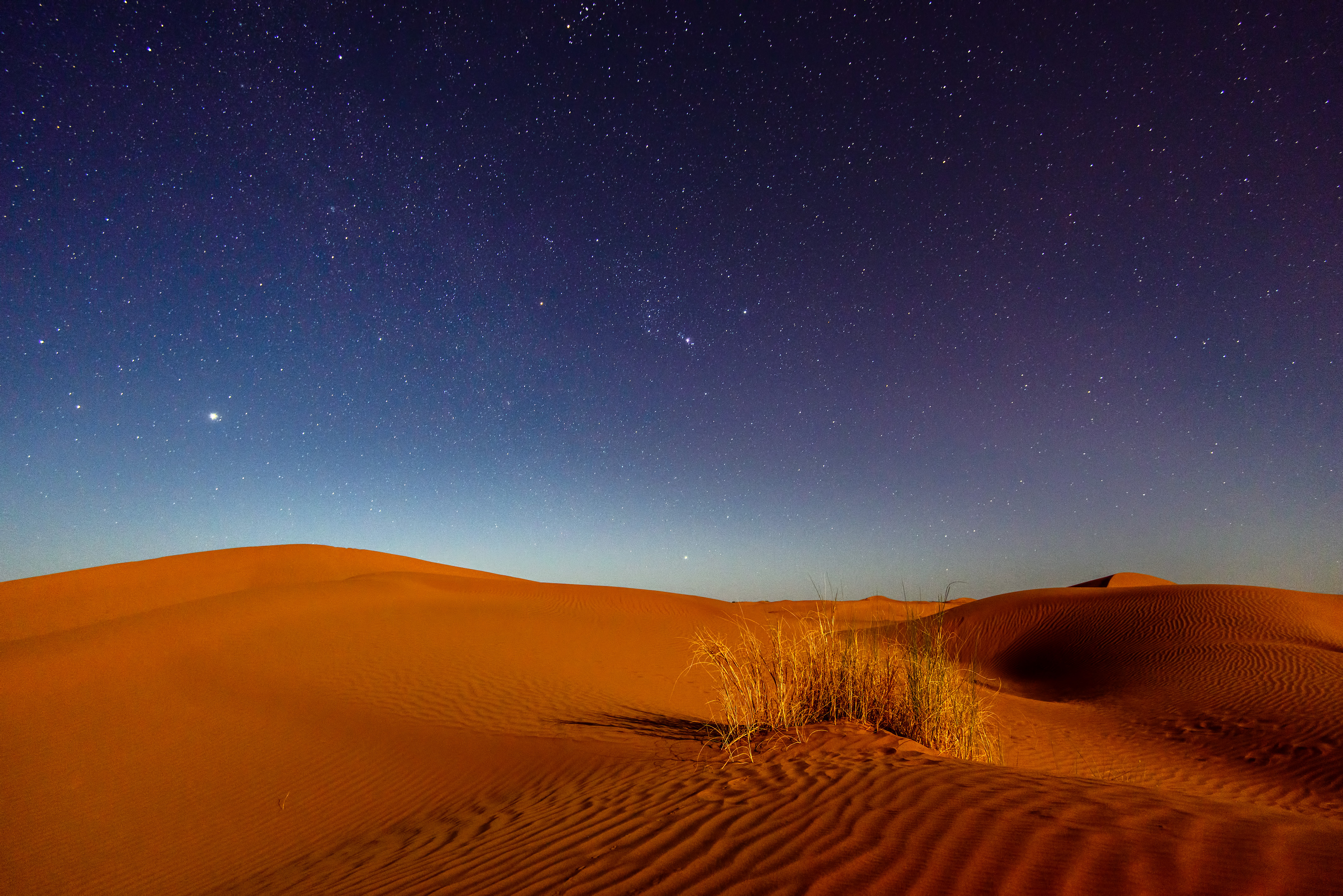
    Sahara Desert
  - Tanezrouft – a desert covering northern Mali, northwestern Niger as well as central and southern Algeria, at the west of the Hoggar Mountains
  - El Djouf – a desert which covers northeastern Mauritania and parts of northwestern Mali
  - Djurab Desert – a desert covering northern central Chad
  - Tin-Toumma Desert – a desert covering southeastern Niger, at the south of the Ténéré
  - Libyan Desert (also called Western Desert) – a desert covering eastern Libya, western Egypt and northwestern Sudan at the west of the Nile River
    - White Desert – a desert covering a part of western Egypt and located in Farafra, Egypt
  - Eastern Desert – a desert covering eastern Egypt and northeastern Sudan between the Nile River and the Red Sea
    - Nubian Desert – a desert covering northeastern Sudan between the Nile River and the Red Sea
    - Bayuda Desert – a desert covering eastern Sudan located just at the southwest of the Nubian Desert
  - Sinai Desert – a desert located on the Sinai Peninsula in Egypt
  - Atlantic Coastal Desert – a desert lying along the western coast of the Sahara Desert and occupies a narrow strip in Western Sahara and Mauritania

== Asia ==
- Arabian Desert – desert complex on the Arabian Peninsula comprising:
  - Al Khatim Desert – a desert near Abu Dhabi
  - Al-Dahna Desert – a desert being the main central division of the Arabian Desert and covering parts of Saudi Arabia
  - Empty Quarter (Rub' al Khali) – the world's largest sand desert and covering much of Saudi Arabia, Oman, the United Arab Emirates and Yemen
  - Nefud Desert – a desert in northern part of the Arabian Peninsula
  - Ramlat al-Sab`atayn – a desert in north-central Yemen
  - Sharqiya Sands – a desert covering great parts of Oman
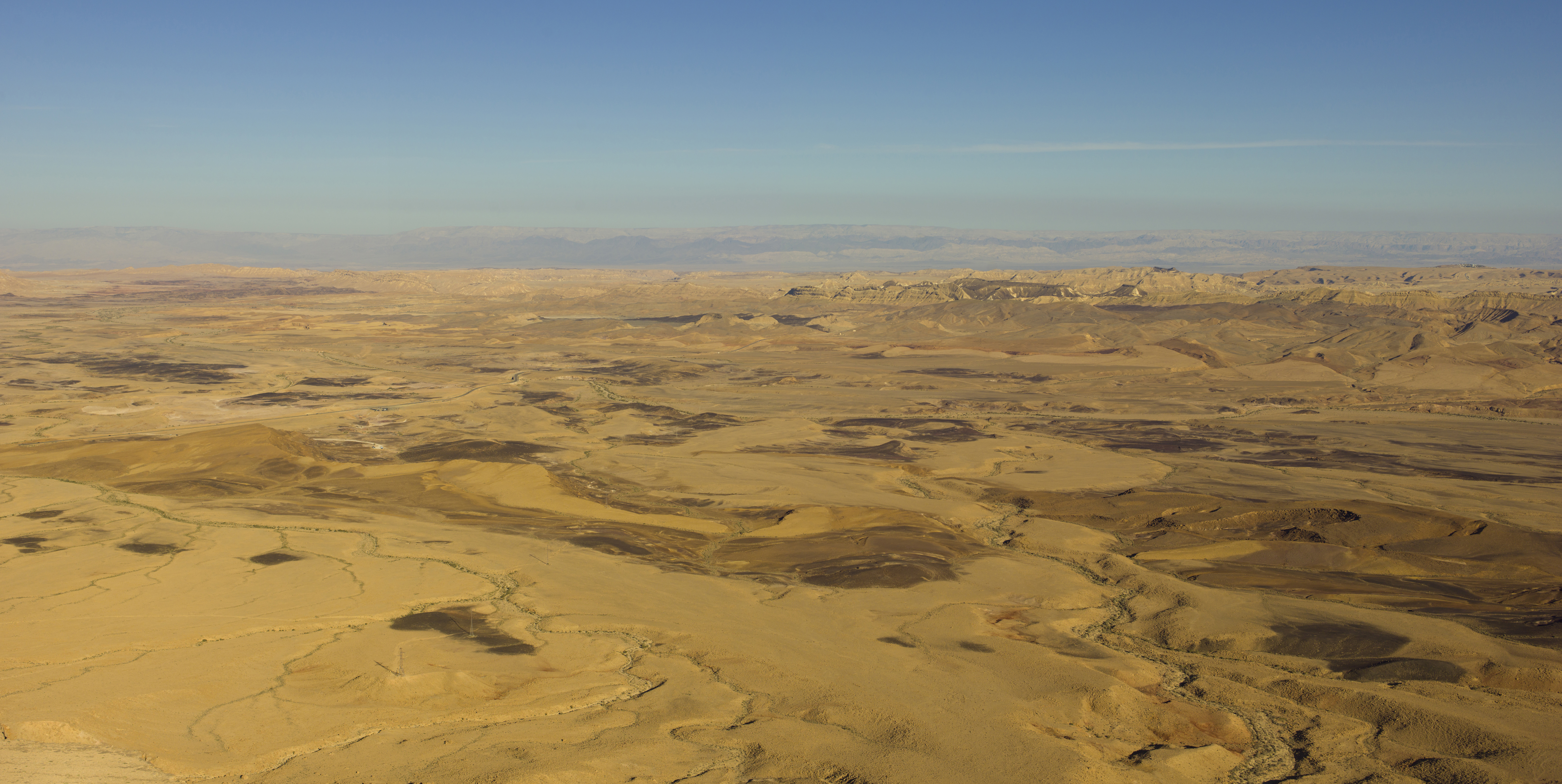
    Aerial view of Negev
  - Judaean Desert – a desert in eastern Israel and the West Bank
  - Negev – a desert located in southern Israel
- Syrian Desert – a desert in Syria, Jordan and Iraq
- Bromo Sand Sea – a volcanic desert in Bromo Tengger Semeru National Park, East Java, Indonesia
- Dasht-e Kavir – a desert in central Iran
- Dasht-e Lut – a large salt desert in southeastern Iran
- Polond Desert – a desert in eastern Iran
- Maranjab Desert – a desert in central Iran
- Katpana Desert – a cold desert in Pakistan
- Sarfaranga Desert – a cold desert in Pakistan
- Indus Valley Desert – a desert in Pakistan
- Kharan Desert – a desert in Pakistan
- Thal Desert – a desert in Pakistan
- Thar Desert – a desert in India and Pakistan
  - Cholistan Desert – a desert in Pakistan
- Dasht-e-Margo – a desert in southwestern Afghanistan
- Kyzyl Kum – a desert in Kazakhstan and Uzbekistan
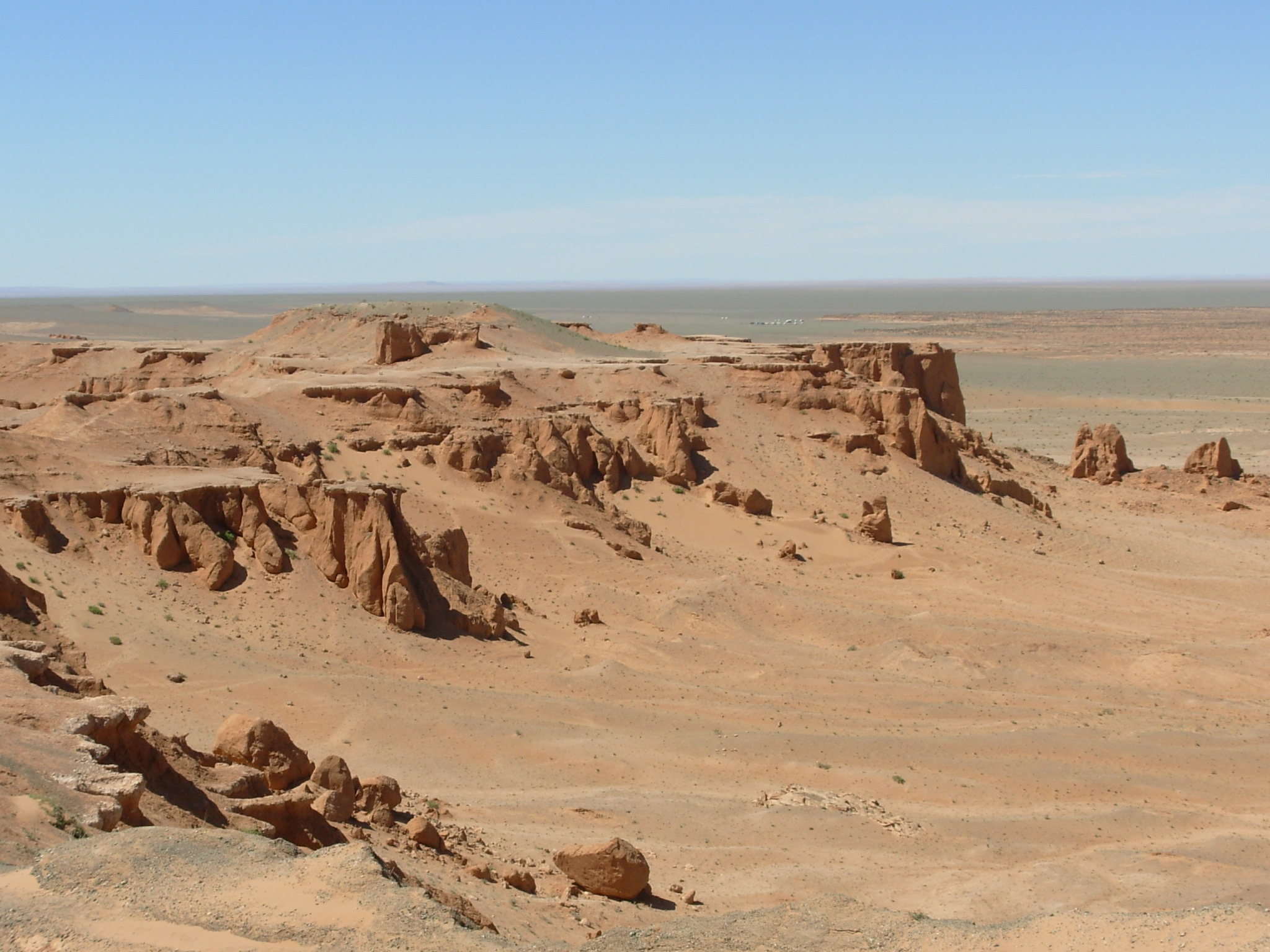
  Gobi in Mongolia
- Kara Kum – a large desert in Central Asia
- Lop Desert – a desert in China
- Ordos – a desert in northern China
  - Kubuqi Desert – a desert in northern China
  - Mu Us Desert – a desert in northern China
- Gobi – a desert in Mongolia and China
  - Badain Jaran Desert – a desert in China
  - Hami Desert – a desert in China
  - Tengger Desert – a desert in China
- Taklamakan – a desert located in China
- Gurbantünggüt Desert – a desert located in northwestern China
- Kumtag Desert – a desert in northwestern China
- Karapinar Desert – a desert in Southern Central Anatolia

== Europe ==
=== Spain ===
- Bardenas Reales – a semi-arid desert in Navarre, Spain (455 km^{2}; 176 sq mi)
- Cabo de Gata-Níjar Natural Park – an arid desert in Almeria, Spain (460 km^{2}; 180 sq mi)
- Monegros Desert – a semi-arid desert in Aragón, Spain
- Tabernas Desert – an arid and semi-arid desert in Almería, Spain (280 km^{2}; 110 sq mi)

=== Other European nations ===
- Oleshky Sands – a sand semi-arid desert in Kherson Oblast, Ukraine
- Ryn Desert - a desert in western Kazakhstan and Astrakhan Oblast, Russia

== North America ==
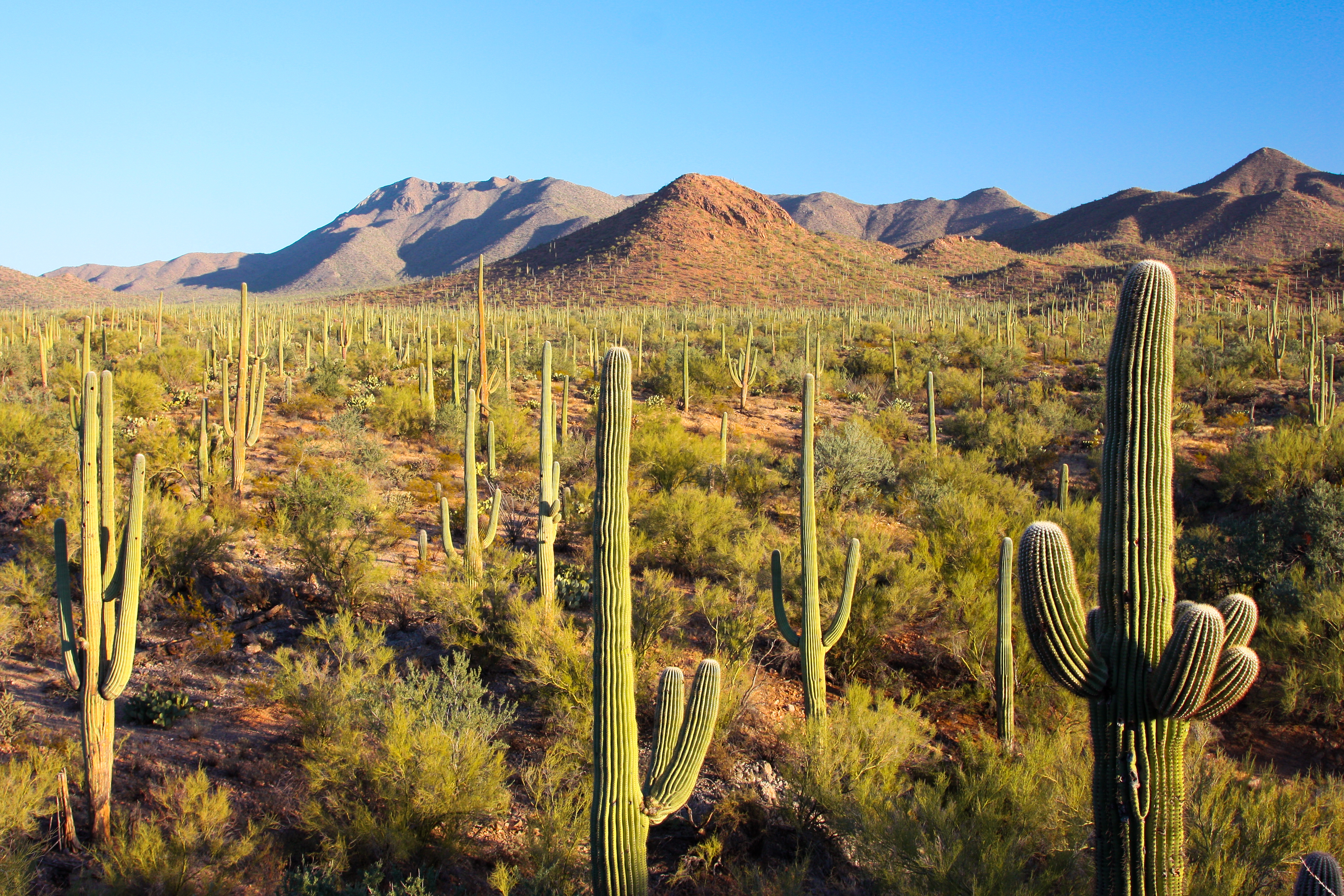
Sonoran Desert

- Chihuahua Desert – a desert in Mexico and the United States
- Great Basin Desert
  - Black Rock Desert
- Mojave Desert – a desert in the United States
  - Death Valley
- Red Desert (Wyoming)
- Sonoran Desert – a desert in the United States and Mexico
  - Colorado Desert
  - Gran Desierto de Altar
- Thompson Plateau – a desert in Canada

== Oceania ==
=== Australia ===
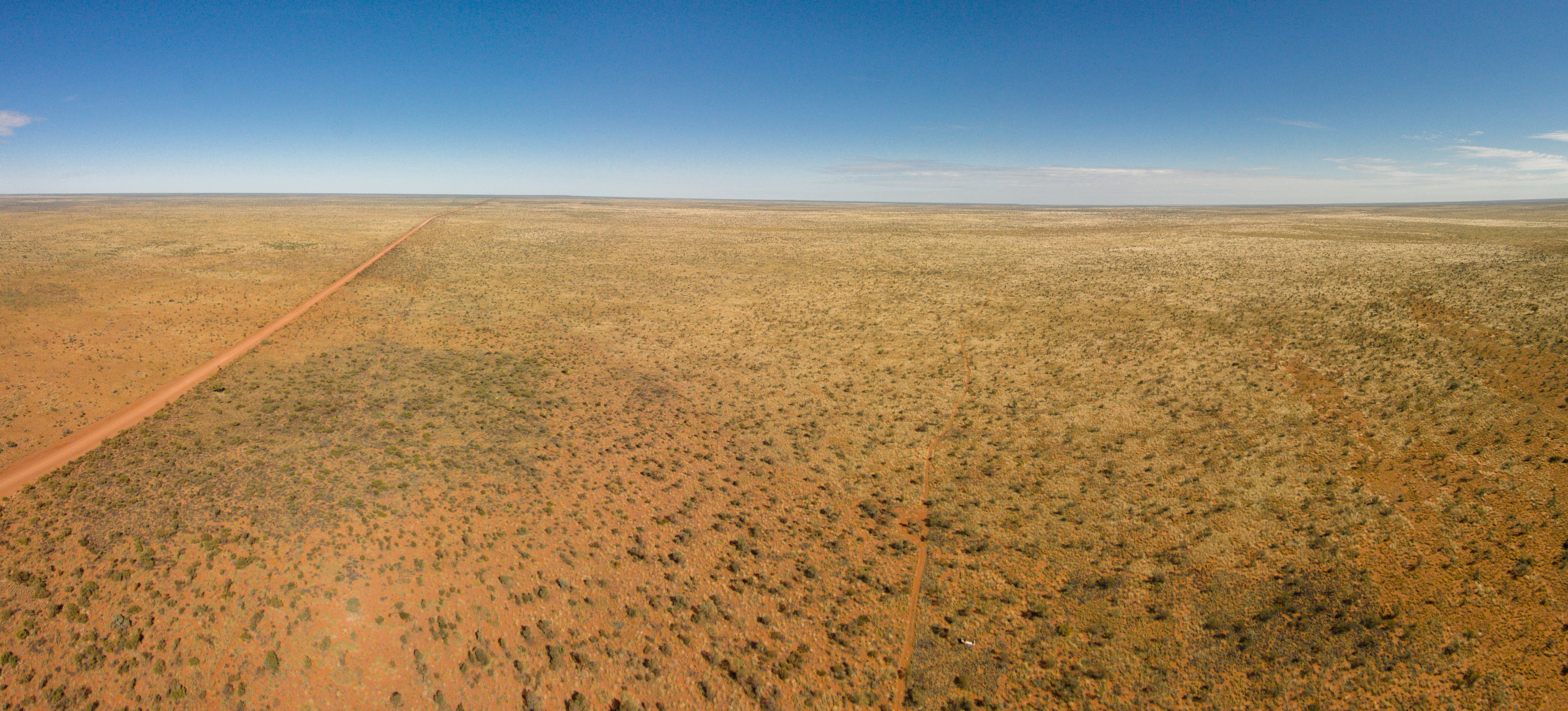
Tanami Desert in Australia

- Central Desert – a central Australian desert
- Gibson Desert – a central Australian desert
- Great Sandy Desert – a northwestern Australian desert
- Great Victoria Desert – the biggest desert in Australia
- Little Sandy Desert – a western Australian desert
- Simpson Desert – a central Australian desert
- Strzelecki Desert – a south-central Australian desert
- Tanami Desert – a northern Australian desert

== South America ==
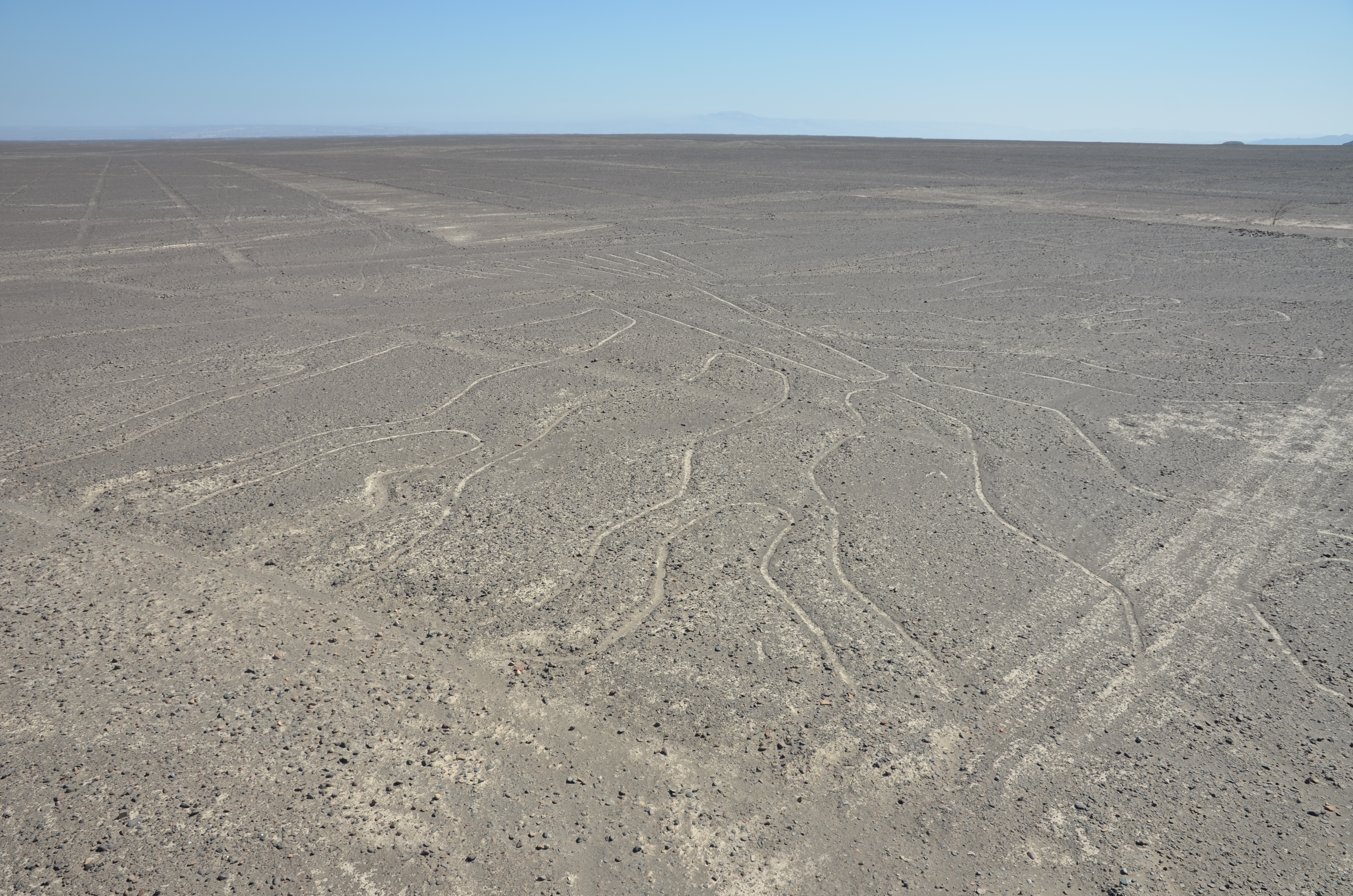
Sechura Desert in Peru

- Atacama Desert – a desert in Chile and Peru
- La Guajira Desert – a desert in Colombia and Venezuela
- Monte Desert – in Argentina, a smaller desert above the Patagonian Desert
- Patagonian Desert – the largest desert in the Americas, located in Argentina
- Sechura Desert – a desert located south of the Piura Region of Peru
- Jalapão – a desert park in Tocantins, Brazil

== Polar regions ==
=== Antarctic ===
- Antarctic Desert – the largest desert in the world
  - McMurdo Dry Valleys – a series of extremely dry, snow-free valleys in Victoria Land
  - Meyer Desert – a small desert close to the South Pole

=== Arctic ===
- Arctic Desert – the second largest "desert" in the world, though it consists of frozen ocean, land ice, and tundra, so (like the rest of this section) not a desert climate in any conventional sense
  - North American Arctic – a large tundra in Northern America
    - Greenland – mostly covered by land ice, like Antarctica
  - Russian Arctic – a large tundra in Russia

== Pseudo-deserts ==
Some geographical features are referred to as "deserts", and this word may even feature in their names, despite not meeting any meteorological definitions for a desert.

- Accona Desert – area of Siena, Italy.
- Barreiro da Faneca – clayey expanse in the Azores.
- Błędowska Desert – area of sands in Poland.
- The Burren – limestone karst in County Clare, Ireland.
- Carcross Desert – sand-dune system in Yukon, Canada.
- Chara Sands – region of Siberia, Russia.
- Deliblatska Peščara – sand expanse in Vojvodina, Serbia.
- Desert of Maine – 40-acre expanse of glacial sand-dunes in Maine, United States.
- Desert of Wales – a large, upland area of Wales.
- Dunas dos Ingleses – sand-dune system in Brazil.
- Dungeness – shingle expanse in South East England, United Kingdom, misleadingly nicknamed "Britain's only desert".
- Highlands of Iceland – the interior plateau of Iceland;
- Joaquina Beach – beach in Brazil.
- Kaʻū Desert – an area of desertification in Hawaii, due to the acid rainfall caused by the nearby Kīlauea volcano.
- Larzac – limestone karst plateau in the south of the Massif Central, France.
- Lençóis Maranhenses National Park
- Lieberose Desert – a desert on a former military training ground in southern Brandenburg, Germany
- Melnik Desert Canyon – a canyon in Bulgaria.
- Oltenian Sahara – area of desertification in Oltenia, Romania.
- The Stone Desert – rock formation in Bulgaria.
- Red Desert – desert-like region in South Africa.
- Sand dunes of Lemnos – sand-dune expanse on Lemnos, Greece.
- Sands of Đurđevac – sand-dune system in Croatia.
- Sleeping Bear Dunes – lakeshore in Michigan, United States.
- Słowiński National Park – sand-dune expanse in Poland.
- Tottori Sand Dunes – sand-dune system in Tottori Prefecture, Japan.
- Chad Basin National Park – desert park in northern Nigeria.

== See also ==
- Desert
- Desertification
- List of deserts by area
- Polar desert
- Tundra
