= Lompoul desert =

Desert in Senegal

Lompoul Desert
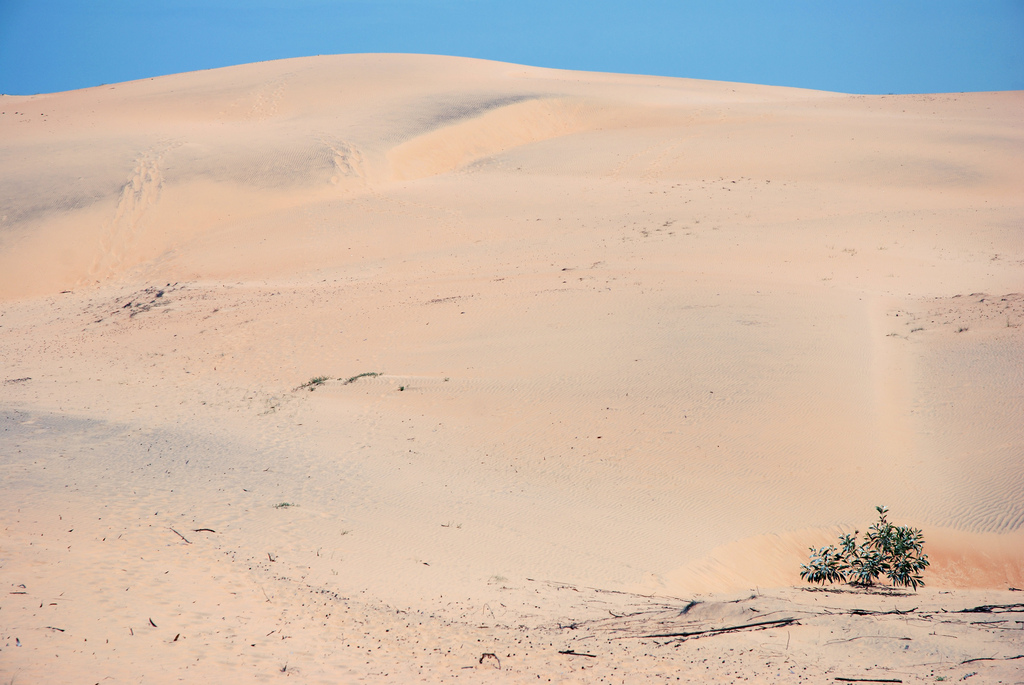
- Sand dunes in the Lompoul

- Location within Senegal
- Area: 18 km^{2} (6.9 mi^{2})

Naming
- Native name: French: Désert de Lompoul

Geography
- Country: Senegal
- Coordinates: 15.4624°N 16.688°W
- Interactive map of Lompoul Desert

The Lompoul desert (sometimes spelled Lumpoul; in French, Désert de Lompoul) is a small desert of about 18 km^{2}. It is located in the Louga region of Senegal.

It features orange sand dunes akin to those in the Sahara and Mauritania, unlike the surrounding landscape in Senegal (see the Grande Côte).

The desert is named after its closest settlement, the village of Lompoul.

== Geography ==
The Lompoul has a surface area of about 18 square kilometers (6.9 sq mi). It is located in north-west Senegal, between the cities of Saint-Louis (Sénégal) and Dakar.

The desert consists of many sand dunes, which can reach heights of up to 50 meters.

== Festival du Sahel ==
The Festival du Sahel, a local music festival, has taken place in the Lompoul desert since 2009.

== Mineral sands extraction ==
In recent years, parts of the Lompoul desert and the surrounding coastal strip have been affected by heavy mineral sands mining, particularly for zircon, ilmenite and rutile, under a concession operated by the French mining company Eramet through its subsidiary Eramet Grande Côte (in which the Government of Senegal also has an indirect equity of 10%). The use of large dredging equipment has altered dune landscapes and generated local concerns about environmental impacts and changes to traditional land uses in the region.
