= Grand Bara =

Desert in Djibouti

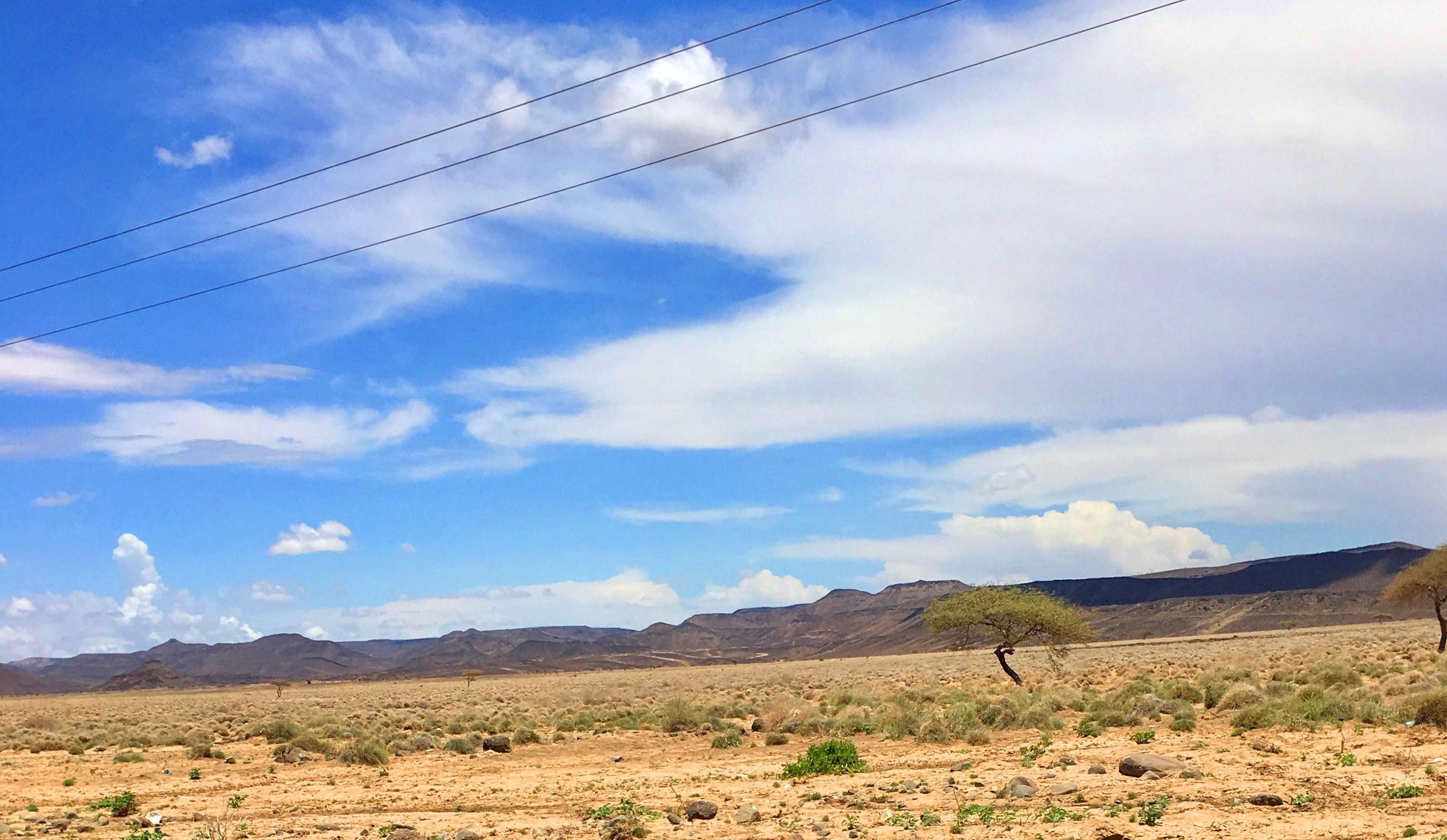
- The Grand Bara Desert
- Area: 103 km^{2} (40 mi^{2})

Geography
- Country: Djibouti
- States/Provinces: Ali Sabieh Region; Arta Region; Dikhil Region
- Coordinates: 11.235°N 42.61°E
- Interactive map of Grand Bara

The Grand Bara (Somali: Baadha Wayn), Bara Wein or Bada Wein, is a desert in southern Djibouti. It consists of large areas of sand flats, with sparse, semi-desert and desert grasses and scrub vegetation. A road built in 1981 passes through the area, connecting the capital Djibouti City with the south. Prior to the arrival of the French, the extremely arid interior was inhabited primarily by the Issa Somali. Runners make their way across the Grand Bara Desert during the Annual Grand Bara 15K race.

== Geography ==
The Grand Bara and Petit Bara are the remains of dried up lake beds. They form vast arid plains in the centre of Djibouti and mark the delimitation of the volcanic part of the country from the sedimentary part. The clay of which they are formed is poorly drained and water collects here in the rainy season and this is followed by the growth of grasses.

Djibouti has few paved roads; it has been estimated that there are about 2,900 km (1,802 mi) of roads, only about 12% being paved, and fewer than half being serviceable throughout the year. In 1981, a road across the Grand Bara was built, linking the capital with the south. It is about 40 km (25 mi) long.

== Ecology ==
The Grand Bara is part of the Ethiopian xeric grasslands and shrublands ecoregion. Large mammals occurring in this area include the Beira antelope (Dorcatragus megalotis), Dorcas gazelle (Gazella dorcas), Soemmerring's gazelle (Gazella soemmerringii), Salt's dik-dik (Madoqua saltiana) and gerenuk (Litocranius walleri). Few Beisa oryx (Oryx beisa) remain after great hunting pressure. The Berbera gerbil (Gerbillus acticola) is endemic to this region as are Arnold's leaf-toed gecko (Hemidactylus arnoldi) and the northern sand gecko (Tropiocolotes somalicus). Archer's lark (Heteromirafra archeri) is the only endemic bird species.

== Climate ==
The heavy rainfall affected the Grand Bara. As a Result the Plain floods in July and September. The climate of the Grand Bara limits the number of animals living permanently in these extreme conditions.

Climate data for Grand Bara
Month	Jan	Feb	Mar	Apr	May	Jun	Jul	Aug	Sep	Oct	Nov	Dec	Year
Mean daily maximum °C (°F)	27 (81)	28 (82)	30 (86)	32 (90)	34 (93)	38 (100)	38 (100)	37 (99)	35 (95)	32 (90)	29 (84)	27 (81)	32 (90)
Mean daily minimum °C (°F)	17 (63)	19 (66)	21 (70)	23 (73)	26 (79)	28 (82)	27 (81)	26 (79)	24 (75)	20 (68)	18 (64)	17 (63)	22 (72)
Source: The World Weather Channel
