= Sankal =

Sankal سانكال
- Village
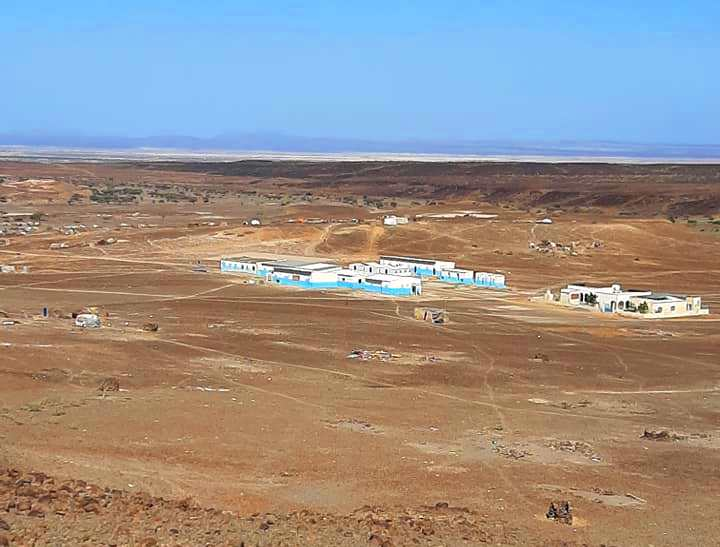

- Location in Djibouti
- Coordinates: 10°58′21″N 42°12′11″E
- Country: Djibouti
- Region: Dikhil
- Elevation: 457 m (1,499 ft)

Population (2024 census)
  - Total: 1,241

Sankal (Arabic: سانكال) is a village in southwestern Djibouti. It is situated about 24 kilometres (15 miles) southwestern of Dikhil and 1 km north of the border with Ethiopia.

== Overview ==
Nearby towns and villages include Dikhil (26 km), Bondara (15 km) and As Eyla (12 km). The village inhabitants belong to various mainly Afro-Asiatic-speaking ethnic groups, with the Issa Somali predominant.

== Climate ==
Sankal has a hot arid climate (Köppen BWh), with two main seasons. There is a short monsoonal wet season from July to September and a length dry season covering the rest of the year.

Climate data for Sankal
Month	Jan	Feb	Mar	Apr	May	Jun	Jul	Aug	Sep	Oct	Nov	Dec	Year
Mean daily maximum °C (°F)	25.7 (78.3)	26.0 (78.8)	27.2 (81.0)	29.0 (84.2)	31.9 (89.4)	36.0 (96.8)	38.7 (101.7)	38.2 (100.8)	34.2 (93.6)	30.1 (86.2)	27.8 (82.0)	26.3 (79.3)	30.9 (87.7)
Mean daily minimum °C (°F)	18.5 (65.3)	19.5 (67.1)	20.8 (69.4)	22.4 (72.3)	24.0 (75.2)	26.3 (79.3)	28.1 (82.6)	27.6 (81.7)	25.9 (78.6)	22.6 (72.7)	20.1 (68.2)	18.6 (65.5)	22.9 (73.2)
Average rainfall mm (inches)	5 (0.2)	8 (0.3)	11 (0.4)	22 (0.9)	5 (0.2)	3 (0.1)	32 (1.3)	40 (1.6)	39 (1.5)	10 (0.4)	4 (0.2)	2 (0.1)	181 (7.2)
Source: Climate-Data.org
