= Bondara, Djibouti =

Bondara بندارا
- Town
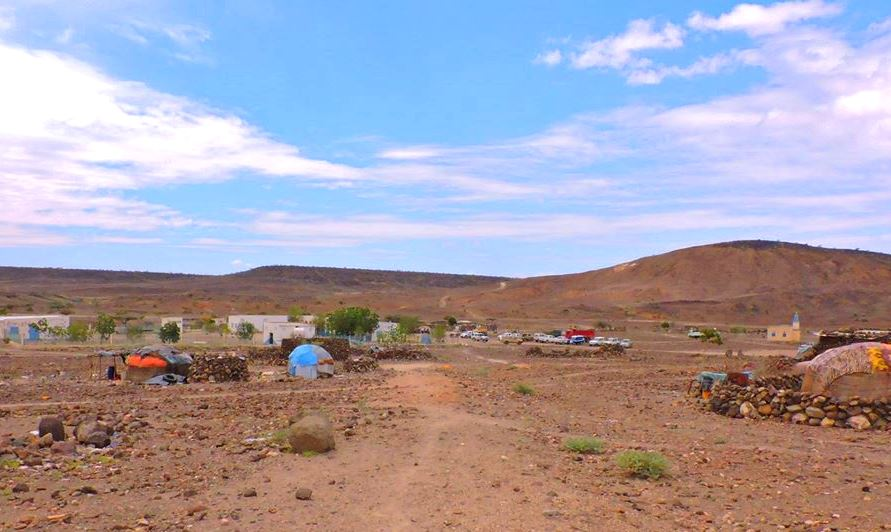

- Location in Djibouti
- Coordinates: 11°01′N 42°20′E
- Country: Djibouti
- Region: Dikhil
- Elevation: 470 m (1,540 ft)

Population (2019)
  - Total: 387

Bondara is a town in the south of Dikhil Region. It is situated about 11 kilometres (6 miles) south of Dikhil and 2 km north of the border with Ethiopia.

== Overview ==
The town lies near the border with Ethiopia. Nearby towns and villages include Dikhil (10 km), Sankal (15 km) and As Eyla (26 km).

== Demographics ==
The town inhabitants belong to various mainly Afro-Asiatic-speaking ethnic groups, with the Issa Somali predominant.

== Climate ==
Bondara is located at an altitude of 470 meters above sea level in low-shrouded mountains and hills and the surrounding mountains.

Climate data for Bondara
Month	Jan	Feb	Mar	Apr	May	Jun	Jul	Aug	Sep	Oct	Nov	Dec	Year
Mean daily maximum °C (°F)	27.2 (81.0)	27.4 (81.3)	28.0 (82.4)	28.2 (82.8)	31.1 (88.0)	35.4 (95.7)	38.5 (101.3)	37.5 (99.5)	33.7 (92.7)	29.4 (84.9)	28.2 (82.8)	27.5 (81.5)	31.0 (87.8)
Mean daily minimum °C (°F)	17.5 (63.5)	18.8 (65.8)	20.0 (68.0)	21.6 (70.9)	23.3 (73.9)	25.5 (77.9)	27.9 (82.2)	27.4 (81.3)	25.2 (77.4)	22.2 (72.0)	19.4 (66.9)	17.8 (64.0)	22.2 (72.0)
Average precipitation mm (inches)	7 (0.3)	8 (0.3)	11 (0.4)	25 (1.0)	9 (0.4)	2 (0.1)	30 (1.2)	43 (1.7)	39 (1.5)	8 (0.3)	6 (0.2)	2 (0.1)	190 (7.5)
Source: Climate-Data.org
