= National Highway 6 (Djibouti) =

Road in Djibouti

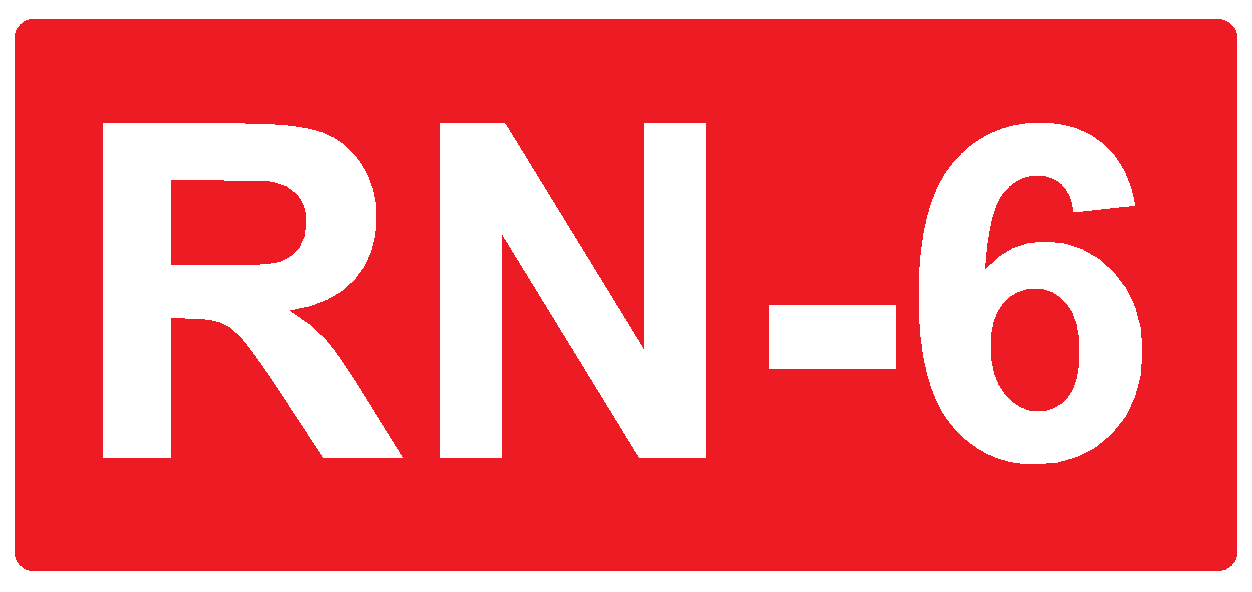
National Highway 6
- Arabic: الطريق السريع الوطنى 6 French: Route Nationale 6
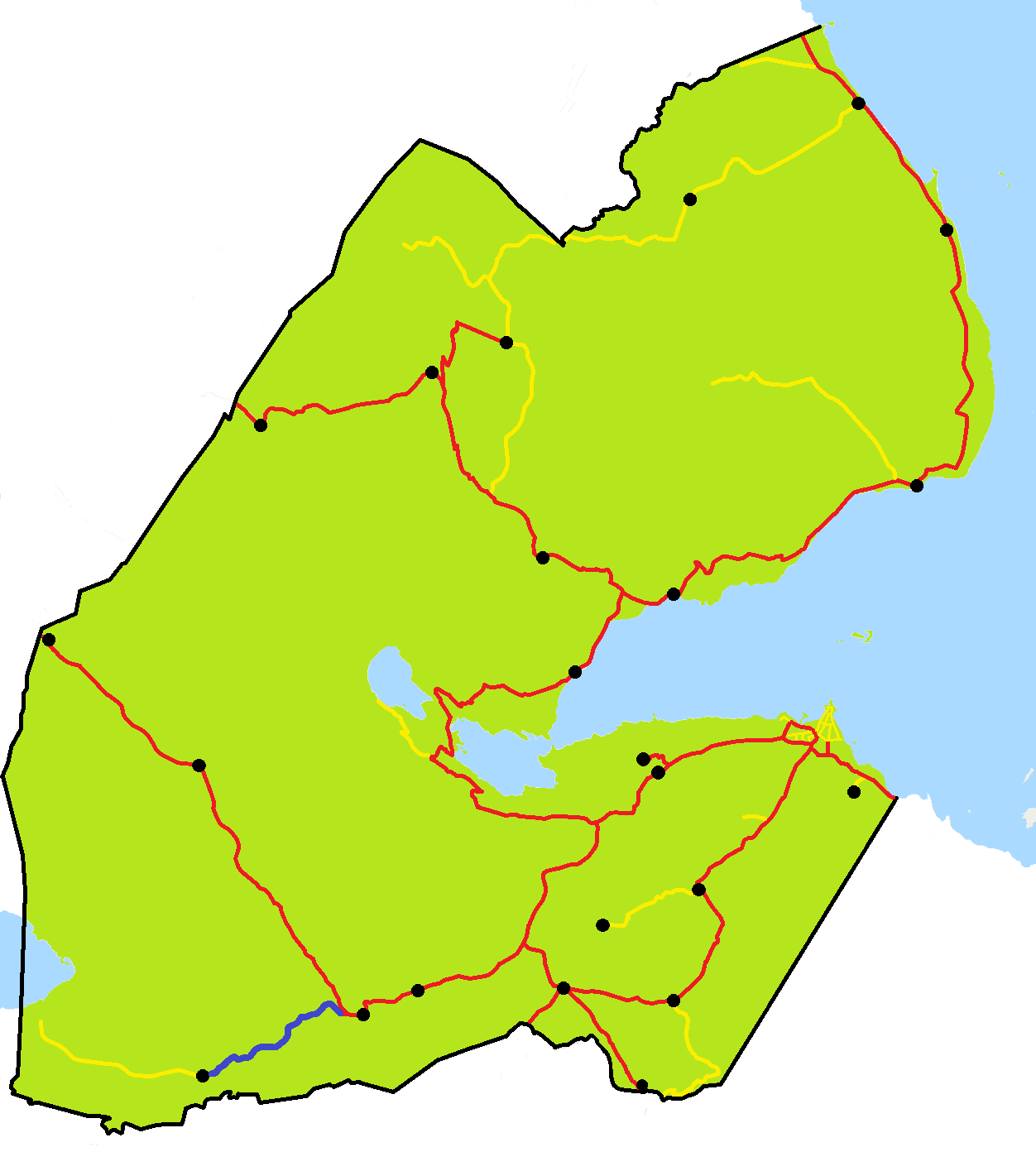

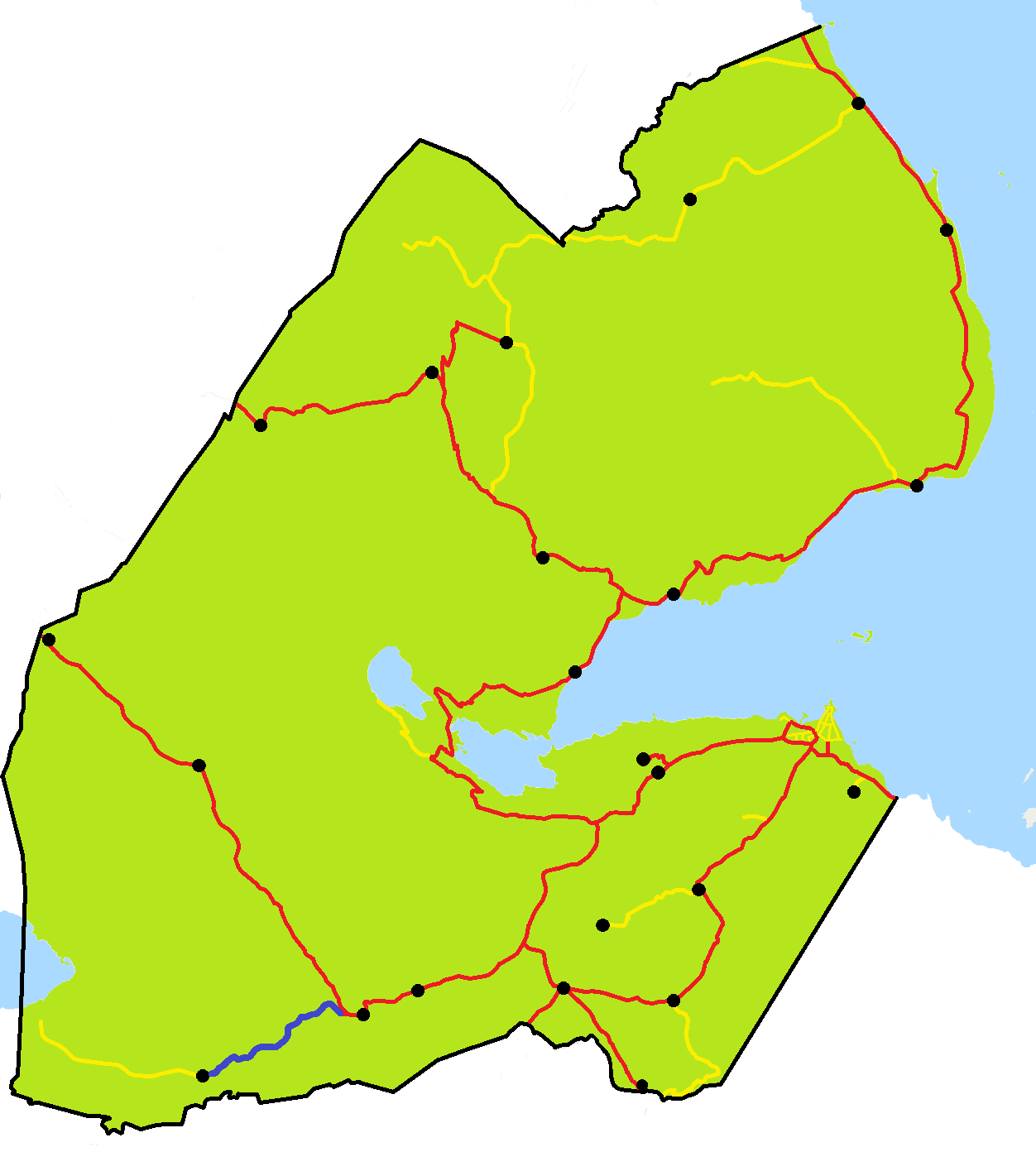

Route information
- Length: 37 km (23 mi)

Major junctions
- From: Junction with National Highway 1
- To: As Eyla

Location
- Country: Djibouti

Highway system
- Transport in Djibouti

The RN-6 National Highway is a national highway in southwestern Djibouti. The highway begins at 11°06′32″N 42°20′47″E, at a junction with National Highway 1 near Dikhil. It passes through the town of As Eyla and ends at the village of Kouta Bouyya (11°00′55″N 41°58′37″E).
