= Kouta Bouya =

Kouta Bouya كوتا بويا
- Town
- Location in Djibouti
- Coordinates: 11°01′N 41°58′E
- Country: Djibouti
- Region: Dikhil
- Elevation: 309 m (1,014 ft)

Population (2024 census)
  - Total: 1,161

Kouta Bouya (Arabic: كوتا بويا) is a town in the western Dikhil region of Djibouti. It is situated about 53 km (33 mi) west of Dikhil.

== Overview ==
The village was originally built on the plain of Gobaad, with houses constructed of mud and stone. Most of the inhabitants earned their living through animal husbandry and commerce, and used a well for drinking water. Nearby towns and villages include As Eyla (15 km), Lake Abbe (24 km) and Dikhil (53 km).

== Climate ==
Kouta Bouyya has a hot desert climate (Köppen climate classification BWh).

Climate data for Kouta Bouyya
Month	Jan	Feb	Mar	Apr	May	Jun	Jul	Aug	Sep	Oct	Nov	Dec	Year
Mean daily maximum °C (°F)	31 (88)	32 (90)	34 (93)	37 (99)	39 (102)	41 (106)	38 (100)	38 (100)	39 (102)	36 (97)	33 (91)	31 (88)	36 (96)
Mean daily minimum °C (°F)	19 (66)	19 (66)	21 (70)	23 (73)	25 (77)	27 (81)	27 (81)	27 (81)	27 (81)	23 (73)	20 (68)	19 (66)	23 (74)
Average precipitation mm (inches)	2 (0.1)	4 (0.2)	7 (0.3)	8 (0.3)	3 (0.1)	6 (0.2)	32 (1.3)	39 (1.5)	21 (0.8)	5 (0.2)	3 (0.1)	1 (0.0)	131 (5.1)
Source: Climate-Data.org
