= As Eyla =

As Eyla ايلى
- Town
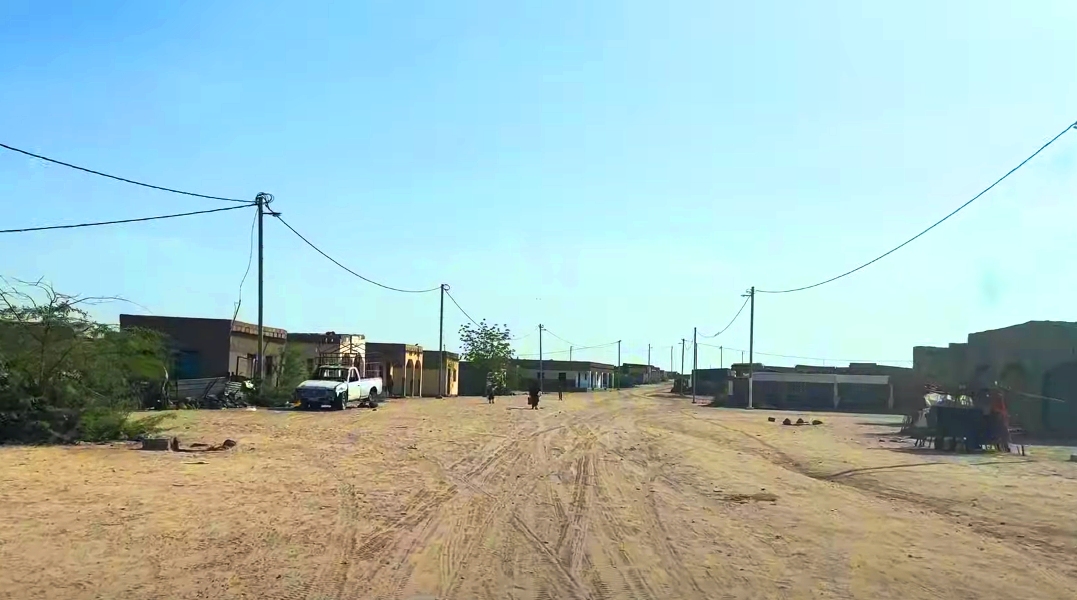
- View of the town

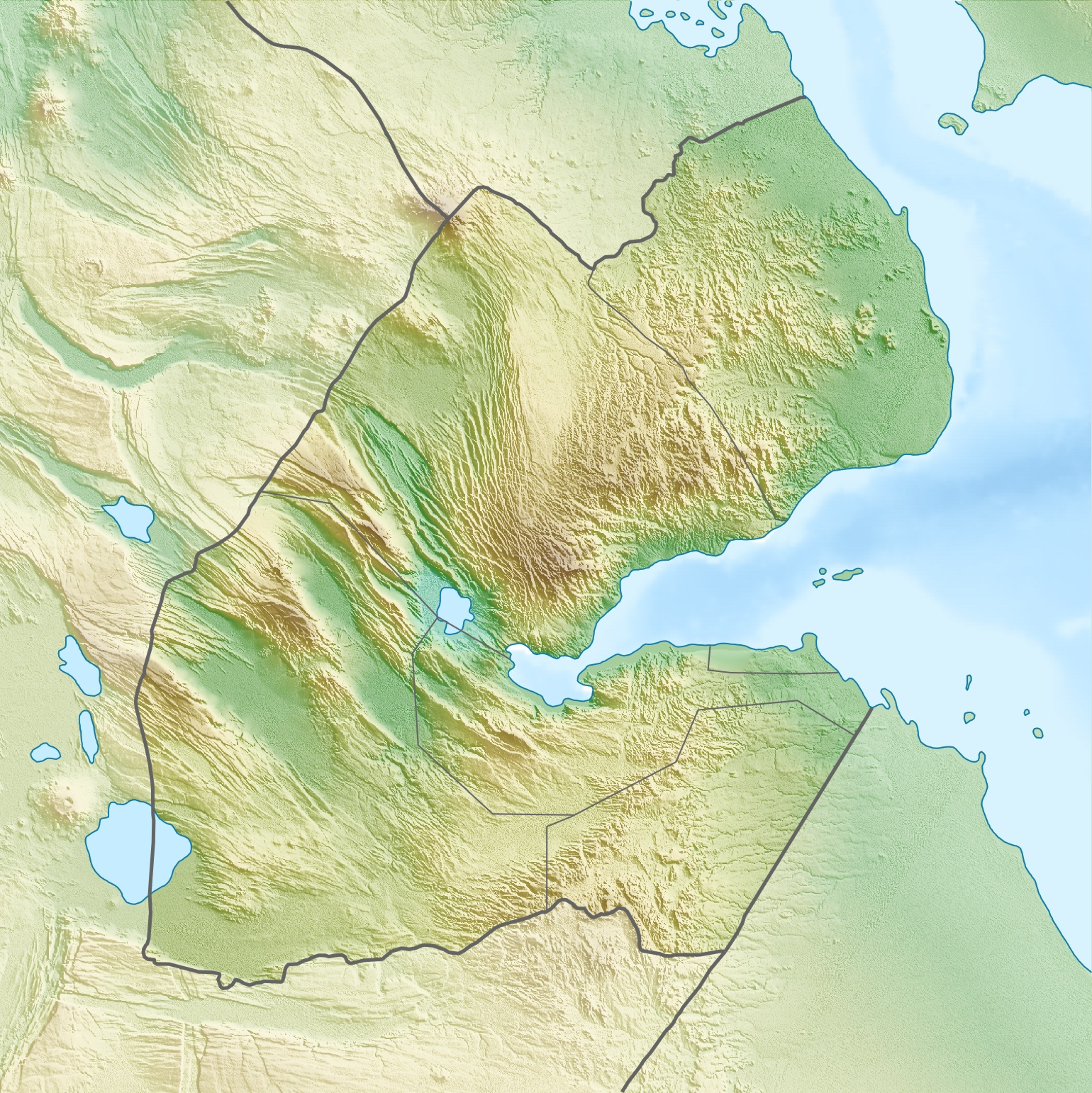
- Location in Djibouti
- Coordinates: 11°00′25″N 42°06′17″E
- Country: Djibouti
- Region: Dikhil
- Elevation: 253 m (830 ft)

Population (2024 census)
  - Total: 5,173
- Time zone: UTC+03:00 (EAT)

As Eyla (Arabic: ايلى) is a town in Djibouti located around 160 kilometres (99 miles) southwest of the capital, Djibouti City, and 5 km (3 miles) north of the border with Ethiopia. It is located along the National Highway 6. The tourist richness of the crater-formed Lake Abbe, which is located within the boundaries of As' Eyla Province.

== Demographics ==
As of the 2024 census, the population of As Eyla was at 5,173. The town is inhabited by various mainly Afro-Asiatic-speaking ethnic groups (Afar and Somali-Issa).

== History ==
=== Asa Ragid ===
On the Asa Ragid site, the material found consists of shell middens from oysters, basalt rhyolite peaks whose dating, for the older material, is at 5000–5800 years BC. Also found were circular stone structures, a microlithic industry made of red jasper and obsidian, and pottery shards more or less decorated with beads and ostrich egg shell.

As for the site of Asa Koma (Red Hill) near to As Eyla, it revealed a life towards the end of the third millennium BC with a population of fishermen who hunted jackal, raised cattle, and made pottery decorated with prints and chiseled features of good quality. and which shapes and colors are similar to ceramics found in Sudan. A burial of an elderly adult and a young woman of 18 was discovered in 1989. Finds included many lithic obsidian and bone tools and beads of ostrich egg shells or shells of the Red Sea, and animal bones, especially jackals, hippos rarely, or gazelles, antelopes and domestic cattle and bones of fish (tilapia and catfish). Scattered throughout the country and in more recent times are the cairn housing Graves (hundreds in the north). In one of these mounds in Balho, a fragment of cranium from the early first millennium BC was found. The diversity of these burials attests to different periods to which they relate.

=== French Somaliland ===
The village was originally built on the plain of Gobaad near a wadi, with houses constructed of mud and stone, before the French arrived. From 1862 until 1894, the land to the north of the Gulf of Tadjoura was called Obock and was ruled by Somali and Afar Sultans, local authorities with whom France signed various treaties between 1883 and 1887 to first gain a foothold in the region. The French colonial authorities built a garrison station in 1934. An elementary school was established in the village in 1949, and there were several shops. Most of the inhabitants earned their living through animal husbandry and commerce, and used a well for drinking water.

== Climate ==
Climate data for As Eyla
Month	Jan	Feb	Mar	Apr	May	Jun	Jul	Aug	Sep	Oct	Nov	Dec	Year
Mean daily maximum °C (°F)	30.0 (86.0)	30.4 (86.7)	32.7 (90.9)	34.6 (94.3)	37.9 (100.2)	40.1 (104.2)	39.4 (102.9)	38.2 (100.8)	37.3 (99.1)	34.6 (94.3)	31.8 (89.2)	30.4 (86.7)	34.8 (94.6)
Daily mean °C (°F)	24.9 (76.8)	25.9 (78.6)	27.8 (82.0)	29.7 (85.5)	32.5 (90.5)	34.7 (94.5)	33.3 (91.9)	32.5 (90.5)	32.5 (90.5)	29.4 (84.9)	26.6 (79.9)	25.2 (77.4)	29.6 (85.2)
Mean daily minimum °C (°F)	19.9 (67.8)	21.4 (70.5)	23.1 (73.6)	24.7 (76.5)	27.3 (81.1)	29.3 (84.7)	27.1 (80.8)	26.7 (80.1)	27.9 (82.2)	24.1 (75.4)	21.3 (70.3)	20.2 (68.4)	24.4 (76.0)
Average precipitation mm (inches)	5 (0.2)	9 (0.4)	15 (0.6)	30 (1.2)	9 (0.4)	3 (0.1)	34 (1.3)	44 (1.7)	24 (0.9)	9 (0.4)	3 (0.1)	2 (0.1)	187 (7.4)
Source 1: Climate-Data.org
Source 2: Levoyageur
